= List of ship launches in 1850 =

The list of ship launches in 1850 includes a chronological list of some ships launched in 1850.

Date	Ship	Class	Builder	Location	Country	Notes
1 January	Geraldine	Barque	T. Royden & Sons	Liverpool	United Kingdom	For Messrs. Worrall, Royden, Stott & Wakeham.
2 January	Livorno	Steamship	Alex. Denny & Brother	Dumbarton	United Kingdom	For Messrs. McKean, McLarty & Co.
2 January	Termagant	Merchantman	Messrs. T. & W. Smith	North Shields	United Kingdom	For private owner.
4 January	Isabella & Dorothy	Merchantman	Simpson & Short	Sunderland	United Kingdom	For E. Oliver.
8 January	Metropolis	Barque	Ralph Hutchinson	Sunderland	United Kingdom	For Lindsay & Co.
12 January	One	Schooner	Messrs. Hall	Monkwearmouth	United Kingdom	For private owner.
14 January	Jane Ewing	East Indiaman	Messrs. William Simons & Co.	Greenock	United Kingdom	For private owner.
14 January	Victoria	Barque	G. W. & W. J. Hall	Sunderland	United Kingdom	For J. Donkin.
28 January	Arctic	Paddle Steamer	William H. Brown	New York	United States	For Collins Line.
28 January	New World	Steamship		New York City	United States	For private owner.
January	Boston	Steamship		New York	United States	For private owner.
29 January	Amelia Thompson	Barque	Haswell & Co.	Sunderland	United Kingdom	For .
29 January	Oliver Cromwell	Barque	Messrs. T. Young & Son	Newcastle upon Tyne	United Kingdom	For private owner.
30 January	Earl of Hardwick	Whaler	Messrs. J. & T. White	Cowes	United Kingdom	For Southern Whale Fishery Company.
31 January	Asia	Steamship	Messrs. Steel	Greenock	United Kingdom	For British and North American Royal Mail Steam Packet Company.
31 January	Derwent	Steamship	W. Pitcher		United Kingdom	For Royal Mail Steam Packet Company.
January	Albatross	Full-rigged ship			United Kingdom	For private owner.
January	Alice	Merchantman	William Harkass	North Sands	United Kingdom	For Mr. Huntley.
January	Meander	Barque	Richard Wilkinson	Sunderland	United Kingdom	For private owner.
January	Star in the East	Barque	Richard Wilkinson	Sunderland	United Kingdom	For Thomas Kish.
5 February	Baltic	Paddle steamer	Brown & Bell	New York	United States	For Collins Line.
12 February	Elizabeth Caroline	Merchantman	Messrs. Gaddy & Lamb	Newcastle upon Tyne	United Kingdom	For private owner.
14 February	Helena Sloman	Steamship	Messrs. T. & W. Pim	Hull	United Kingdom	For Robert Miles Sloman.
14 February	Powhatan	Frigate		Norfolk Naval Shipyard	United States	For United States Navy.
25 February	Coldstream	Brig	Booth & Blacklock	Sunderland	United Kingdom	For William Kerss & associates.
28 February	City of Glasgow	Steamship	Tod and MacGregor	Partick	United Kingdom	For Inman Line.
28 February	Hero	Barque	Robert Thompson & Sons	Sunderland	United Kingdom	For E. Graham.
February	Martha	Schooner	Buchanan & Gibson	Sunderland	United Kingdom	For Mr. Peacock.
1 March	Douro	Schooner	Richard Price	Caernarfon	United Kingdom	For private owner.
1 March	Marie of Wolgast	Steamship	Messrs. John Reid & Co.	Port Glasgow	United Kingdom	For Mr. Homeyer.
2 March	Reindeer	Steamship	Thomas Collyer	New York	United States	For Mr. De Groot.
4 March	Ispwich Lass	Schooner	William Bayley	Ipswich	United Kingdom	For William Bayley.
4 March	Prince Albert	Steamship	Messrs. William Denny & Bros.	Dumbarton	United Kingdom	For Caledonian Railway.
14 March	Lady Franklin	Brig	Messrs. Walter Hood & Co.	Aberdeen	United Kingdom	For Admiralty.
15 March	City of Calcutta	East Indiaman	Messrs. Barclay and Curle.	Stobcross	United Kingdom	For Messrs. George Smith & Sons.
16 March	Nankin	Frigate		Deptford Dockyard	United Kingdom	For Royal Navy.
22 March	Lapwing	Brig	Messrs. Birnie	Montrose	United Kingdom	For private owner.
25 March	Luna	Steamship	Messrs. W. Denny & Bros.	Dumbarton	United Kingdom	For Thoms Wardropper.
25 March	Neptune	Steamship	Messrs. W. Denny & Bros.	Dumbarton	United Kingdom	For Thomas Wardropper.
25 March	Queen	Steamship	Messrs. W. Denny & Bros.	Dumbarton	United Kingdom	For private owner.
27 March	Prudence	Snow	Todd & Browne	Sunderland	United Kingdom	For J. Hall.
27 March	Truth	Schooner	W. H. Pearson	Sunderland	United Kingdom	For J. Lennox.
28 March	Ceylon	Merchantman	Alcock	Sunderland	United Kingdom	For private owner.
28 March	My Lady	Merchantman		Chester	United Kingdom	For Edward Walker.
30 March	Brilliant	Full-rigged ship	Messrs. Alexander Duthie & Co.	Aberdeen	United Kingdom	For private owner.
March	Athelston	East Indiaman	Messrs. Kelsick, Wood & Sons.	Maryport	United Kingdom	For private owner.
March	Gratitude	Barque	R. H. Potts & Bros.	Sunderland	United Kingdom	For Potts Bros.
March	Saxon Maid	Snow	Ratcliffe & Spence	Sunderland	United Kingdom	For Potts & Co.
4 April	Sylph	Lugger	William Wright	Beccles	United Kingdom	For private owner.
5 April	Susquehanna	Frigate		New York Navy Yard	United States	For United States Navy.
9 April	Sophia	Brig	Adamson	Dundee	United Kingdom	For private owner.
16 April	San Jacinto	Frigate		New York Navy Yard	United States	For United States Navy.
25 April	Avalon	Yacht	Messrs. Harvey & Son	Ipswich	United Kingdom	For James Goodson.
27 April	Conqueror	Full-rigged ship	Messrs. Hall & Sons	Aberdeen	United Kingdom	For private owner.
27 April	Express	Brigantine	Thomas Edward	St. Mary's	United Kingdom	For Messrs. Banfield & others.
27 April	Harold	Barque	William Taylor & Son	North Hylton	United Kingdom	For Pow & Co.
27 April	Shepherdess	Barque	Messrs. W. Duthie & Co.	Aberdeen	United Kingdom	For private owner.
29 April	Arrow	Sloop	Allinson	Tarleton	United Kingdom	For private owner.
29 April	Ballet Reina	Schooner	Camper	Gosport	United Kingdom	For R. Davenport.
30 April	Sappho	Yacht	Messrs. J. Walters and Co.	Topsham	United Kingdom	For private owner.
April	Sylph	Barque		Dumbarton	United Kingdom	For private owner.
April	Viking	Barque	Lawson Gales	Sunderland	United Kingdom	For Peter Scott.
10 May	Felix	Schooner	Messrs. Sloan & Gemmell	Ayr	United Kingdom	For John Ross.
13 May	Admiral	Full-rigged ship	Messrs. Denny & Rankine	Dumbarton	United Kingdom	For Messrs. Potter, Wilson & Co.
13 May	John's	Merchantman	Mayor	Freckleton	United Kingdom	For Messrs. John Birley & Sons.
13 May	Pedro II	Corvette	Estabelecimento de Fundição e Estaleiros Ponta da Areia	Niterói	Brazil	For Imperial Brazilian Navy.
14 May	Nisus	Génie-class brig		Brest	France	For French Navy.
16 May	Le Vingt-quatre Fevrier	Napoléon-class ship of the line		Toulon	France	For French Navy.
21 May	Advice	Barque	John Duncan	Speymouth	United Kingdom	For Mr. Gray.
25 May	Astrologer	Steamship	Messrs. Smith & Rodger	Govan	United Kingdom	For Messrs. Lewis Potter & Co.
27 May	Jane Sawyer	Schooner	Messrs. Humphrey Bros.	Hull	United Kingdom	For Mr. Sawyer and others.
27 May	Susan	Brig	Messrs. Spencer & Ballet	Hull	United Kingdom	For Messrs. Thomas Wilson & Sons.
28 May	Pioneer	Brig	Messrs. Barr & Shearer	Ardrossan	United Kingdom	For private owner.
28 May	Wasp	Archer-class sloop		Deptford Dockyard	United Kingdom	For Royal Navy.
29 May	Achilles	Barque	Robert Thompson & Sons	Sunderland	United Kingdom	For Watson & Co.
29 May	Rajahgopaul	Merchantman	T. H. Oliver	Saint-Roch	(United Kingdom of Great Britain and Ireland) Province of Canada	For Messrs. Pryde & Jones.
30 May	Mercia	Full-rigged ship	James Laing	Sunderland	United Kingdom	For Prowse & Co.
May	Addison	Merchantman	Robert Thompson & Sons	Sunderland	United Kingdom	For Richard Brown & associates.
May	Agenoria	Barque	George Barker	Sunderland	United Kingdom	For G. Gray.
May	Capital	Snow	Ralph Hutchinson	Sunderland	United Kingdom	For J.Parkin.
May	Garland	Full-rigged ship		Quebec	(United Kingdom of Great Britain and Ireland) Province of Canada	For private owner.
6 June	Il Monarca	Ship of the line		Castellamare di Stabia	Kingdom of the Two Sicilies	For Royal Sicilian Navy.
6 June	Three Bells	Full-rigged ship	Messrs. William Denny & Bros.	Dumbarton	United Kingdom	For John Bell & others.
10 June	Alabama	Paddle steamer	William H. Webb	New York	United States	For private owner.
11 June	Java	Brig	Messr. Booth & Co.	Sunderland	United Kingdom	For Mr. Blacklock.
11 June	Pelican	Steamship		Cork	United Kingdom	For private owner.
12 June	Countess of Cawdor	Brig	Anderson	Nairn	United Kingdom	For Mr. Dallas.
12 June	Harriett Preston	Schooner	Rees Jones	Dinas	United Kingdom	For John Preston.
16 June	Repeater	Merchantman	Sparrow		United Kingdom	For private owner.
16 June	Surprise	Extreme clipper	Samuel Hall	East Boston, Massachusetts	United States	A. A. Low & Brother
27 June	Anglo-Saxon	Barque	E. Taylor	North Shields	United Kingdom	For private owner.
28 June	Africa	Steamship	Steele	Greenock	United Kingdom	For British and North American Royal Mail Steam Packet Company.
30 June	Elizabeth Frances	Merchantman	Hughes	Teignmouth	United Kingdom	For Messrs. Hutchings.
June	Chevalier	Snow	W. H. Pearson	Sunderland	United Kingdom	For Mr. Scurfield.
June	Hibernia	Full-rigged ship		Quebec	(United Kingdom of Great Britain and Ireland) Province of Canada	For private owner.
June	Lucia	Corvette		Trieste	(Austrian Empire)	For Austrian Navy.
June	Mandarin	Extreme clipper	Smith & Dimon	New York	United States	For Goodhue & Co.
June	Owen Palfer	East Indiaman		Workington	United Kingdom	For private owner.
June	Race Horse	Clipper barque	Samuel Hall	East Boston, Massachusetts	United States	J.M. Forbes, I. Goddard & Co., Boston.
8 July	Resolution	Barque	James Hardie	Sunderland	United Kingdom	For Clarke & Co.
9 July	Fidget	Yacht	John Laird	Birkenhead	United Kingdom	For private owner.
9 July	Luna	Snow	Peter Austin	Sunderland	United Kingdom	For Carr & Co.
9 July	Raven	Snow	R. H. Potts & Bros.	Sunderland	United Kingdom	For Potts & Co.
10 July	Courier	East Indiaman	Messrs. Coutts & Parkinson	Newcastle upon Tyne	United Kingdom	For private owner.
10 July	Pernana	Barque	Messrs. Cato, Miller & Co.	Liverpool	United Kingdom	For Currie, Newton & Co.
11 July	John Melhuish	East Indiaman	Clarke	Jersey	Jersey	For J. J. Melhuish & Co.
11 July	Lord Nelson	Barque	White	Cowes	United Kingdom	For private owner.
11 July	Mary Watkin	Schooner	Owen Jones	Nevin	United Kingdom	For private owner.
20 July	Alarm	Steamship	Rawlins	Bristol	United Kingdom	For private owner.
24 July	Elizabeth Campbell	Barque		Dumbarton	United Kingdom	For private owner.
25 July	Acis	Schooner	William Bayley	Ipswich	United Kingdom	For F. B. Ede.
25 July	Hendon	Snow	W. Reed	Sunderland	United Kingdom	For Walker & Son.
July	Hannah	Merchantman	George Barker	Sunderland	United Kingdom	For M. Stainton.
July	Nono	Merchantman			Prussia	For private owner.
July	Thomas Gowland	Snow	J. Rogerson	Sunderland	United Kingdom	For J. Rogerson.
July	Waterman No. 1	Steamship		Bristol	United Kingdom	For private owner.
2 August	Albatross	Steamship	Messrs. Smith & Rodgers	Govan	United Kingdom	For Cork and Waterford Steam Shipping Company.
8 August	Genova	Steamship	Messrs. Alexander Denny & Brother	Dumbarton	United Kingdom	For Anglo-Italian Steam Navigation Company.
8 August	Palmerston	East Indiaman	William Gibson	Hull	United Kingdom	For private owner.
10 August	City of Paris	Steamship	Messrs. William Joyce & Co.	Greenwich	United Kingdom	For Commercial Steam Navigation Company.
15 August	Advocate	Barque	Stephen Walshe	Dublin	United Kingdom	For private owner.
21 August	Cæsaraea	Steamship	Messrs. T. & W. Pim	Hull	United Kingdom	For private owner.
23 August	Hamilla Mitchell	Clipper	Messrs. Lunan & Robertson	Peterhead	United Kingdom	For John Mitchell.
24 August	Stornoway	Clipper	Alexander Hall and Sons	Aberdeen	United Kingdom	For Jardine, Matheson & Co.
26 August	Furious	Furious-class frigate	Miller & Ravenhill	Portsmouth Dockyard	United Kingdom	For Royal Navy.
31 August	Arctic	Merchantman			United States	For A. Terega.
August	Catherine Hayes	Schooner	Charles Connell & Sons	Belfast	United Kingdom	For private owner.
August	James Richard Hindson	Merchantman	Booth & Blacklock	Sunderland	United Kingdom	For T. Hindson.
August	Ocean Breeze	Merchantman	William Doxford & W. Crown	Sunderland	United Kingdom	For Mr. Brantingham.
5 September	Roland	Corvette		Toulon	France	For French Navy.
5 September	Sultan	Snow	Forrest & Co	Sunderland	United Kingdom	For W. Burdes.
6 September	John Bryant	Full-rigged ship		Charleston, South Carolina	United States	For private owner.
7 September	Banshee	Merchantman	Westacott	Barnstaple	United Kingdom	For Messrs. Casack.
7 September	Seaman	Baltimore clipper	R. & E. Bell	Baltimore, Maryland	United States	For Thomas Handy.
10 September	Rose	Steamship	Messrs. Napier	Govan	United Kingdom	For Glasgow and Londonderry Steam Packet Company.
19 September	Martin	Acorn-class brig-sloop		Pembroke Dockyard	United Kingdom	For Royal Navy.
21 September	Earl of Douglas	Steamship	Toward	Newcastle upon Tyne	United Kingdom	For private owner.
23 September	Caledonia	Schooner	Messrs. William Denny & Bros.	Dumbarton	United Kingdom	For Stockton and London Shipping Company.
24 September	Lotus	Yacht	Camper's Yard	Portsmouth	United Kingdom	For Lord Clifden.
24 September	Pacific	Paddle steamer	William H. Brown	New York	United States	For Albert Lowry, Nathanial Jarvis and William H. Brown.
24 September	Singapore	Steamship	Messrs. Tod & MacGregor	Partick	United Kingdom	For Peninsular and Oriental Steam Navigation Company.
25 September	Dannebrog	Frigate		Copenhagen	Denmark	For Royal Danish Navy.
26 September	James Paxton	Schooner	David Swan	Kelvindock	United Kingdom	For private owner.
30 September	Neirich	Brig	Naisby	North Hylton	United Kingdom	For James Ayre.
30 September	Thebes	Barque	William Byers	Sunderland	United Kingdom	For Rathbone & Co.
September	Alcides	Barque	Lawson Gales	Sunderland	United Kingdom	For J. Gales.
September	La Cruz	Schooner	Arsenal de la Carraca	Cádiz	United Kingdom	For Spanish Navy.
September	Quito	Barque	Austin & Mills	Sunderland	United Kingdom	For Kendall & Co.
September	Swan	Merchantman	Bradley & Potts	Sunderland	United Kingdom	For Bradley & Potts.
5 October	Electra	Barque	W. H. Pearson	Sunderland	United Kingdom	For Reid & Co.
5 October	Ville de Paris	Océan-class ship of the line		Rochefort	France	For French Navy.
5 October	Humboldt	Paddle steamer		New York	United States	For private owner.
5 October	Surprise	Clipper	Samuel Hall	East Boston, Massachusetts	United States	For A. A. Low & Brother.
7 October	Tay	Merchantman	Messrs. Calman & Martin	Dundee	United Kingdom	For private owner.
8 October	Ganges	Steamship	Messrs. Tod & MacGregor	Partick	United Kingdom	For Peninsular and Oriental Steam Navigation Company.
23 October	Meanwell	Snow	W. Pile	Sunderland	United Kingdom	For Kelso & Co.
25 October	Balmoral	Steamship	Messrs. William Denny & Bros.	Dumbarton	United Kingdom	For Messrs. George Gibson & Co.
26 October	John Hancock	Tug		Boston Navy Yard	United States	For United States Navy.
27 October	Winfield Scott	Paddle Steamer	Westervelt & MacKay	New York	United States	For Pacific Mail Steamship Company.
October	Ivanhoe	Steamship		River Tyne	United Kingdom	For Mr. Smith.
October	Sarnia	Steamship	Messrs. T. & W. Pim	Hull	United Kingdom	For private owner.
2 November	Brother Jonathan	Paddle steamer	Perrine, Patterson & Stack	Williamsburg, New York	United States	For Edward Mills.
4 November	Novara	Frigate	Venetian Arsenal	Venice	Austrian Empire	For Austrian Navy.
5 November	Coligny	Frigate		Rochefort	France	For French Navy.
5 November	Leopard	Frigate		Deptford Dockyard	United Kingdom	For Royal Navy.
6 November	Arno	Steamship	Messr. Wood & Reid	Port Glasgow	United Kingdom	For private owner.
8 November	Swanland	Steamship	Messrs. Napier & Crichton	Kelvinhaugh	United Kingdom	For Messrs. W. & C. L. Ringrose.
9 November	Grecian	Steamship	Messrs. Napier	Govan	United Kingdom	For Glasgow & Liverpool Shipping Company.
18 November	Dragonfly	Steamboat		Lake Windermere	United Kingdom	For private owner.
19 November	Isabella Secunda	Steamship	Mare	Blackwall	United Kingdom	For Spanish Navy.
20 November	Narvaez	Steamship		Ferrol	Spain	For Spanish Government.
20 November	Sea Serpent	Extreme clipper	George Raynes	Portsmouth, New Hampshire	United States	For Grinnell, Minturn & Co.
23 November	The Vivid	Cutter	J. Richardson	Brixham	United Kingdom	For private owner.
23 November	Tobin	Lightship	Messrs. Thomas Vernon & Son	Liverpool	United Kingdom	For Trinity House.
28 November	Duchess of Lancaster	Steamship	Messrs. Lamport	Workington	United Kingdom	For Messrs. Lamport & Holt.
30 November	Eclipse	Extreme clipper	Jabez Williams	Williamsburg, New York	United States	For Thomas Wardle and Booth & Edgar.
November	Claro	Barque	William R. Abbay	Sunderland	United Kingdom	For William R. Abbay.
November	Libertador	Steamship		Philadelphia, Pennsylvania	United States	For Venezuelan Navy.
3 December	European	Steamship	Messrs. Smith & Rogers	Govan	United Kingdom	For private owner.
6 December	Mary Thomson	Schooner		Glencaple	United Kingdom	For William Thomson.
7 December	Margaret Smith	Barque	James McMillan	Greenock	United Kingdom	For John Kerr.
7 December	Stag Hound	Extreme clipper	Donald McKay	East Boston, Massachusetts	United States	For George B. Upton and Sampson & Tappan. First extreme clipper
9 December	John Bertram	Extreme clipper	Ewell & Jackson	East Boston, Massachusetts	United States	For Glidden & Williams Line.
19 December	Queen of the Isles	Brig	Messrs. Robinson	Deptford	United Kingdom	For Messrs. Leader and Fittes.
21 December	Game Cock	Extreme clipper	Samuel Hall	East Boston, Massachusetts	United States	For Daniel C. Bacon.
21 December	Witchcraft	Extreme clipper	Paul Curtis	Chelsea, Massachusetts	United States	For Samuel Hal.
25 December	Lot Whitcomb	Paddle Steamer		Milwaukie	(United States) Oregon Territory	For S. S. White, Berryman Jennings and Lot Whitcomb.
December	Marion	Snow	J. Rogerson	Sunderland	United Kingdom	For W. Moore.
December	Sea Serpent	Extreme clipper	George Raynes	Portsmouth, New Hampshire	United States	For Grinnell, Minturn & Co.
Spring	Glencairn	Full-rigged ship	W. G. Russell	Quebec City	(United Kingdom of Great Britain and Ireland) Province of Canada	For private owner.
Summer	Mary Emma	Brig		St. Martin's	(United Kingdom of Great Britain and Ireland) Colony of New Brunswick	For private owner.
Summer	Sibyl	Schooner		Quebec	(United Kingdom of Great Britain and Ireland) Province of Canada	For private owner.
Summer	State Rights	Full-rigged ship		Pittston, Maine	United States	For private owner.
Unknown date	Aberaman	Barque	Austin & Mills	Sunderland	United Kingdom	For Pegg & Co.
Unknown date	Active	Ketch	Daniel Biallie	Paterson River	(United Kingdom of Great Britain and Ireland) New South Wales	For Alexander Brown Jr. and James Brown.
Unknown date	Aeolus	Ketch	T. Chowne	Sydney	(United Kingdom of Great Britain and Ireland) New South Wales	For private owner.
Unknown date	A. H. Schultz	Tug		New York	United States	For private owner.
Unknown date	Akbar	Snow	Lightfoot	Sunderland	United Kingdom	For James Hay.
Unknown date	Alert	Clipper	Metcalf & Norris	Damariscotta, Maine	United States	For Crocker & Warren.
Unknown date	Alfred	Barque	Robert Thompson & Sons	Sunderland	United Kingdom	For Hankey & Co.
Unknown date	Alipore	Merchantman	John Robinson	Sunderland	United Kingdom	For private owner.
Unknown date	Ann & Elizbeth	Schooner	William Harkass	Sunderland	United Kingdom	For Todd & Co.
Unknown date	Ann & Sarah	Snow	William Harkass	Sunderland	United Kingdom	For T. Cooper.
Unknown date	Ann Mitchell	Full-rigged ship		Southwick	United Kingdom	For John Mitchell & others.
Unknown date	Arnon	Merchantman	Tiffin	Sunderland	United Kingdom	For Fowler & Co.
Unknown date	Ashley	Brig	W. & J. Pile	Sunderland	United Kingdom	For Pippet & Co.
Unknown date	Atalante	Full-rigged ship		Vlissingen	Netherlands	For Royal Netherlands Navy.
Unknown date	Augusta	Snow	Hodgson & Gardner	Sunderland	United Kingdom	For J. Wilson.
Unknown date	Avon	Barque	George Worthy	Sunderland	United Kingdom	For H. Moon.
Unknown date	Barbara	Schooner	William Bonker	Salcombe	United Kingdom	For William H. Dugdale, Samuel Fox and others.
Unknown date	Bessie	Snow	W. Pile	Sunderland	United Kingdom	For Squires & Co.
Unknown date	Branscombe	Barque	John Robinson	Sunderland	United Kingdom	For Stuckey & Co.
Unknown date	Briton	Barque	Peter Austin	Sunderland	United Kingdom	For Mr. Stevens.
Unknown date	Briton's Pride	Barque	R. & W. Hutchison	Sunderland	United Kingdom	For Mr. Hutchison.
Unknown date	Calder	Barque	W. Chilton	Sunderland	United Kingdom	For T. Clay.
Unknown date	Cambodia	Full-rigged ship	Arrow Leithead	Sunderland	United Kingdom	For John Hay.
Unknown date	Cashmere	Full-rigged ship	W. Pile	Sunderland	United Kingdom	For J. Hay.
Unknown date	Cassandra	Schooner	Booth & Blacklock	Sunderland	United Kingdom	For J. Johnson.
Unknown date	Celestial	Extreme clipper	W. H. Webb	New York	United States	For Bucklin & Crane.
Unknown date	Clarinda	Snow	Hodgson & Gardner	Sunderland	United Kingdom	For J. Douglas.
Unknown date	Claudia	Snow	Ratcliff, Spence & Co.	Sunderland	United Kingdom	For Crowl & Co.
Unknown date	Cleopatra	Barque	Ralph Hutchinson	Sunderland	United Kingdom	For J. Mitchell.
Unknown date	Columbia	Paddle steamer	Thomas Goodwin and George Hewitt	Astoria	(United States) Oregon Territory	For Frost, Adair, Richards & Green.
Unknown date	Constantine	Barque	W. Naisby	Sunderland	United Kingdom	For George Thompson.
Unknown date	Constantine	Steamship		Portsmouth, New Hampshire	United States	For Messrs. Grinnell, Minturn & Co.
Unknown date	Cocyra	Snow	Stothard	Sunderland	United Kingdom	For Smirk & Co.
Unknown date	Cornubia	Barque		Sunderland	United Kingdom	For Ridley & Co.
Unknown date	Countess	Snow	Thompsons	Sunderland	United Kingdom	For T. Green.
Unknown date	Dahlia	Barque	Alcock	Sunderland	United Kingdom	For Alcock & Co.
Unknown date	Defender	Snow	William Carr	South Hylton	United Kingdom	For Frost & Co.
Unknown date	Defiance	Barque	George Short.	Pallion	United Kingdom	For private owner.
Unknown date	Director	Paddle steamer	Jeremiah Simonson	New York	United States	For Cornelius Vanderbilt.
Unknown date	Dorothy Alice	Snow	Sykes & Co.	Sunderland	United Kingdom	For Tulley & Co.
Unknown date	Eliza Bain	Snow	W. Reed	Sunderland	United Kingdom	For Steel & Co.
Unknown date	Elizabeth Nicholson	Merchantman	Sykes & Co.	Sunderland	United Kingdom	For Mr. Nicholson.
Unknown date	Ellen	Snow	J. H. Robson	Sunderland	United Kingdom	For J. Wright.
Unknown date	Ellen	Snow	Ralph Hutchinson	Sunderland	United Kingdom	For William Thompson Dixon and John Charles Longstaff.
Unknown date	Ellesmere	Schooner	Brundrit & Whiteway	Runcorn	United Kingdom	For Brundrit & Whiteway.
Unknown date	Emma	Brig	Austin & Mills	Sunderland	United Kingdom	For T. Wood.
Unknown date	Emma	Snow	W. Robinson	Sunderland	United Kingdom	For W. Harper.
Unknown date	Emma Tully	Barque	Haswell	Sunderland	United Kingdom	For C. Tully.
Unknown date	Empire	Steamship		Philadelphia, Pennsylvania	United Kingdom	For private owner.
Unknown date	Felton Park	Barque	W. Naisby	Sunderland	United Kingdom	For William Elliott.
Unknown date	Gentoo	Barque	W. H. Pearson	Sunderland	United Kingdom	For W. H. Pearson.
Unknown date	Germania	Full-rigged ship		Portsmouth, New Hampshire	United States	For private owner.
Unknown date	Gift	Barque	R. Y. Watson	Sunderland	United Kingdom	For William Gray.
Unknown date	Gipsy King	Brig	Petre	River Wear	United Kingdom	For Philip Young.
Unknown date	Grey Feather	Clipper	C. S. Husten	Eastport, Maine	United States	For L. H. Sampson & Co.
Unknown date	Harley	Merchantman		Sunderland	United Kingdom	For J. Harley.
Unknown date	Helen Lindsay	Barque	J. Rodgerson	Sunderland	United Kingdom	For W. S. Lindsay.
Unknown date	Hempsyke	Merchantman	Peter Austin	Sunderland	United Kingdom	For Allan & Sons.
Unknown date	Herald	Barque		Sunderland	United Kingdom	For Messrs. Haigh.
Unknown date	Hope	Merchantman	William Doxford & W. Crown	Sunderland	United Kingdom	For Mr. Blakey.
Unknown date	Isabel	Steamship	Hilary McIsaac	St. Peters Bay	(United Kingdom of Great Britain and Ireland) Colony of Prince Edward Island	For Jane Franklin.
Unknown date	Janes	Merchantman	Booth & Blacklock	Sunderland	United Kingdom	For Mr. Speeding.
Unknown date	Jane Strong	Barque	William Harkass	Sunderland	United Kingdom	For Strong & Co.
Unknown date	Janet Willis	full-rigged ship	John Smith	Sunderland	United Kingdom	For J. Willis.
Unknown date	Jenny Lind	Ferry		San Francisco	California	For private owner.
Unknown date	Jenny Lind	Schooner	Thomas Barber	Great Yarmouth	United Kingdom	For Thomas Barber.
Unknown date	John & Jane	Snow	J. Rogderson	South Hylton	United Kingdom	For Mr. Fenwick.
Unknown date	John & Mary	Merchantman	Bartram & Lister	Sunderland	United Kingdom	For John Patton.
Unknown date	John Bunyan	Barque	William R. Abbay	Sunderland	United Kingdom	For Black & Co.
Unknown date	Jubilee	Snow	J. Rodgerson	Sunderland	United Kingdom	For Mr. Gilbert.
Unknown date	Julia	Merchantman	Peter Austin	Sunderland	United Kingdom	For private owner.
Unknown date	Katherine Sharer	Barque	J. Barkes	Sunderland	United Kingdom	For Sharer & Co.
Unknown date	Kitty	Barque		Sunderland	United Kingdom	For Brooks & Co.
Unknown date	Laurel	Snow	Peter Austin	Sunderland	United Kingdom	For Mr. Cooper.
Unknown date	Margaret MacDonald	Schooner	W. Worthy	Sunderland	United Kingdom	For A. MacDonald.
Unknown date	Mary Eleanor	Snow		Sunderland	United Kingdom	For Mr. Haddock.
Unknown date	Mary Louisa	Merchantman		Sunderland	United Kingdom	For G. Avery.
Unknown date	Miaza	Snow		Sunderland	United Kingdom	For Messrs. Milburns.
Unknown date	Moses H. Grinnell	Pilot boat	Grinnell, Minturn & Co.	New York	United States	For New York Pilots.
Unknown date	Mulford	Tug		Chicago, Illinois	United States	For private owner.
Unknown date	Nepaul	Barque		Sunderland	United Kingdom	For Blair & Co.
Unknown date	Nepaulese Ambassador	Barque	Stothard	Sunderland	United Kingdom	For Blair & Co.
Unknown date	Nerbudda	Cutter		Bombay	India	For British East India Company.
Unknown date	Nile	Steamship	Alexander Denny	Dumbarton	United Kingdom	For Moss Line.
Unknown date	Nina	Merchantman	J. Rogerson	Sunderland	United Kingdom	For Mr. Thompson.
Unknown date	Nix	Nix-class aviso	Robinson & Russell	Millwall	United Kingdom	For Prussian Navy.
Unknown date	Northerner	Schooner	John Oades	Clayton, New York	United States	For Henry T. Bacon.
Unknown date	Ocean Queen	Barque		Sunderland	United Kingdom	For Lawes & Co
Unknown date	Partisan	Full-rigged ship		Howdon	United Kingdom	For private owner.
Unknown date	Pero	Merchantman	T. Lightfoot	Sunderland	United Kingdom	For Pearce & Co.
Unknown date	Petchelee	Barque	T. & J. Brocklebank	Whitehaven	United Kingdom	For T. & J. Brocklebank.
Unknown date	Peterhoff	Steam yacht	C. J. Mare & Co.	Blackwall	United Kingdom	For Imperial Russian Government.
Unknown date	Phoebe Dunbar	Merchantman		Sunderland	United Kingdom	For Duncan Dunbar.
Unknown date	Prospect	Merchantman	Bartram & Lister	Sunderland	United Kingdom	For R. Wright.
Unknown date	Ptarmigan	Barque		River Tyne	United Kingdom	For private owner.
Unknown date	Rembang	Full-rigged ship		Rotterdam	Netherlands	For Royal Netherlands Navy.
Unknown date	Resolution	Barque	Hylton Carr	North Hylton	United Kingdom	For J. Rodham.
Unknown date	Robert	Merchantman	Peter Austin	Sunderland	United Kingdom	For Peter Austin.
Unknown date	Robert & Isabella	Sloop	Bowman and Drummond	Blyth	United Kingdom	For private owner.
Unknown date	Rockliff	Barque	Robert Thompson & Sons	Sunderland	United Kingdom	For E. Graham.
Unknown date	Rodney	Full-rigged ship	Arrow Leithead	Sunderland	United Kingdom	For J. Hay.
Unknown date	Royal Thistle	Merchantman		Sunderland	United Kingdom	For private owner.
Unknown date	Salamander	Nix-class aviso	Robinson & Russell	Millwall	United Kingdom	For Prussian Navy.
Unknown date	Sarah	Merchantman		Sunderland	United Kingdom	For Barras & Co.
Unknown date	Sarah Anne	Barque	John Smith	Pallion	United Kingdom	For Mr. Riddell.
Unknown date	Sea Nymph	Clipper		Baltimore, Maryland	United States	For private owner.
Unknown date	Sea Serpent	Clipper	George Reynes	Portsmouth, New Hampshire	United Kingdom	For Grinnell, Minturn & Co.
Unknown date	Stephen Huntly	Snow	W. Carr	Sunderland	United Kingdom	For Mr. Huntly.
Unknown date	Stornoway	East Indiaman			United Kingdom	For private owner.
Unknown date	Successor	Merchantman	J. Candlish	Sunderland	United Kingdom	For Mr. Culliford.
Unknown date	Susannah	Brig		River Wear	United Kingdom	For private owner.
Unknown date	Talavera	Merchantman	James Laing	Sunderland	United Kingdom	For Duncan Dunbar.
Unknown date	Temperance Star	Snow		Sunderland	United Kingdom	For N. Smirk.
Unknown date	Trial	Brigantine	G. W. & W. J. Hall	Monkwearmouth	United Kingdom	For Mr. Cox.
Unknown date	Tromp	Second rate		Dunkerque	France	For Royal Netherlands Navy.
Unknown date	Troubador	Snow	Robert Thompson & Sons	Sunderland	United Kingdom	For Mr. Lumsdon.
Unknown date	Ver	Schooner	J. Barkes	Sunderland	United Kingdom	For J. Barry.
Unknown date	Vesper	Snow	William Reed	Washington	United Kingdom	For Mr. Wilkinson.
Unknown date	Vienna	Brig	W. Pile Jr.	Sunderland	United Kingdom	For J. Hay.
Unknown date	Violet	Merchantman	John Smith	Pallion	United Kingdom	For Mr. Hutchinson.
Unknown date	Wentworth Beaumont	Snow	James Hardie	Sunderland	United Kingdom	For Clarke & Co.
Unknown date	Whitehall	Ferry		Brooklyn, New York	United States	For private owner.
Unknown date	White Squall	Extreme clipper	Jacob Bell	New York	United States	For William Platt & Sons.
Unknown date	William	Snow	G. Bainbridge	Hylton	United Kingdom	For Gordon Bros.
Unknown date	William	Merchantman	E. Bailey	Sunderland	United Kingdom	For private owner.
Unknown date	Wreath	Merchantman	James Laing	Sunderland	United Kingdom	For J. Laing.
Unknown date	Zeehond	Full-rigged ship		Rotterdam	Netherlands	For Royal Netherlands Navy.
Unknown date	Zosteria	Brig	George Barker	Sunderland	United Kingdom	For Goodwin & Co.
