= Mount Warburton Pike =

Mountain on Saturna Island, British Columbia, Canada

- Location within British Columbia
- Location on Saturna Island

Highest point
- Elevation: 401 m (1,316 ft)
- Prominence: 401 m (1,316 ft)
- Listing: Mountains of British Columbia
- Coordinates: 48°46′28″N 123°10′18″W

Geography
- Location: Saturna Island, British Columbia, Canada
- District: Cowichan Land District
- Topo map: NTS 92B14 Mayne Island

Mount Warburton Pike is a mountain on Saturna Island in the Gulf Islands of British Columbia, Canada. It is the highest summit in the Gulf Islands, other than Saltspring Island, and is part of the Gulf Islands National Park Reserve.

The transmitter site for CHEK-DT is located atop Mount Warburton Pike.

== Name origin ==
The mountain is named for Warburton Pike (1861–1915), who alienated land on Saturna in 1886 and whose ranch included the mountain. Pike was an explorer, sportsman and author and wrote a book on his experiences in the Canadian North, The Barren Ground of Northern Canada. Pike's death was untimely and tragic. After returning to Britain to enlist for World War I and, being refused because he was too old, died by suicide. The summit and a rock in Active Pass were named for him, and a memorial was erected at Porter Landing in the Dease Lake region, where he had ventured in his years in B.C. The monument was donated by his friends Osborne Beauclerk, 12th Duke of St Albans and Marshall Latham Bond.
