= Gold Pan Creek =

Gold Pan Creek is a creek located in the Cassiar Country region of British Columbia. The creek is a tributary of the Little Eagle River about 16 kilometres (10 mi) east of Dease Lake. This creek was discovered in the fall of 1925 by two men named Grady and Ford. Gold was discovered in Gold Pan Creek. By the end of 1925, there were 165 claims staked on the creek. Hand sluices were used to mine the creek.

On August 17 (likely 1924), partners W. Grady and Hugh Ford, discovered gold at the headwaters of the Eagle River after stumbling upon the rusty remains of two old gold pans abandoned on the creek bank. Taking these artifacts as a clue, they dug in the spot they named Gold Pan Creek and immediately struck coarse gold worth $15 a day per man. It was later revealed by local Indigenous people that the pans likely belonged to two unknown prospectors who had worked the area in 1875 but perished on the sinking steamer Pacific before they could report their find, leaving the rich claim hidden until Ford and Grady "rediscovered" it nearly 50 years later to start the new rush.
