= SEEC =

SEEC may refer to:

- Stock Exchange Executive Council
- Sociedad Española de Estudios Clásicos
- South East England Councils
- Skagit Environmental Endowment Commission
- Saturna Ecological Education Centre
- Shihlin Electric and Engineering Corporation
