= Gulf Islands Secondary School =

Gulf Island Secondary School

Location
- 112 Rainbow Road; Saltspring Island, British Columbia; Canada; 48°51′20″N 123°30′27″W

Information
- School type: Public, high school
- Founded: 1966
- School board: School District 64 Gulf Islands
- Principal: Kaz Lundgren
- Grades: 8-12
- Enrollment: 636
- Colours: Black, Gold
- Mascot: Scorpion
- Team name: Scorpions
- Website: www.sd64.bc.ca/giss

Gulf Islands Secondary School (GISS) is a grade 8 to 12 public school in School District 64 Gulf Islands in British Columbia, Canada. It is located on Salt Spring Island and is attended by students from Salt Spring Island, Pender Island, Galiano Island, Mayne Island and Saturna Island. The school is home to the Gulf Islands School of Performing Arts (GISPA).
