= Thibert Creek =

Coordinates: 58°48′31″N 130°5′15″W

Thibert Creek is a creek located in the Cassiar Country region of British Columbia.

The creek flows into Dease Lake at the north end. Thibert Creek lies on the western side of Dease Lake. The creek was explored in April, 1873 by Henry Thibert and several French Canadians. Thibert was the first placer gold creek discovered in Cassiar. The creek was mined for gold. The official returns from the gold between the years 1874 and 1895 were $1,279,600. The creek was hand mined by Europeans and Chinese. By 1880 the Chinese owned the majority of claims on the creek as gold on the creek started to dwindle. Only a dozen miners worked the creek by 1895. The creek was later hydraulicked.
