= SS Pacific (1850) =

Ocean liner that sank in 1875

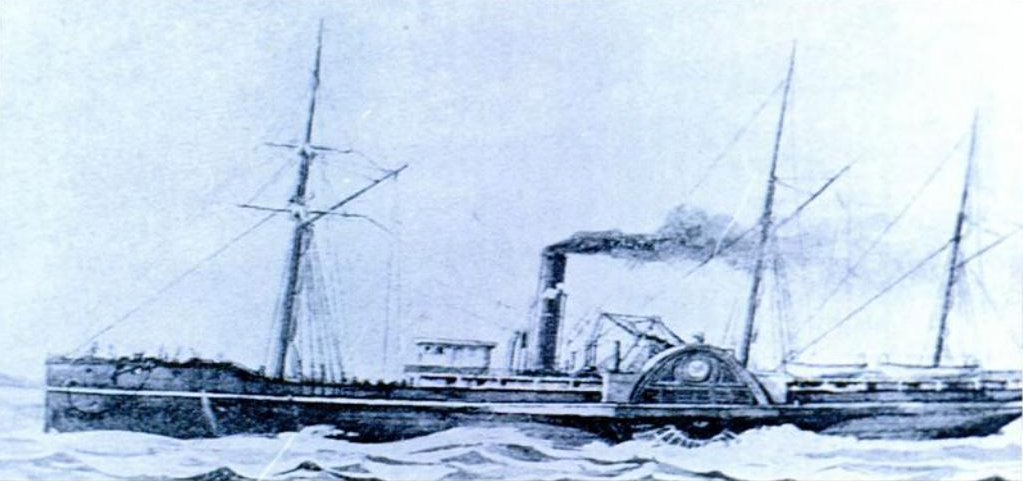
- SS Pacific, from a drawing commissioned early in her career

History

United States
- Name: Pacific
- Builder: William H. Brown, New York
- Launched: September 24, 1850
- Identification: H.W.P.Q.; Official Number 20103
- Fate: Sunk after collision, November 4, 1875 48.383117°N 125.001361°W

General characteristics
- Class & type: Steamship
- Tonnage: 876 tons
- Length: 223 ft (68 m)
- Beam: 33 ft 6 in (10.21 m)
- Decks: 2
- Installed power: 275 hp (205 kW)
- Propulsion: Vertical-beam steam engine; Side paddle-wheels
- Speed: 16 knots (30 km/h; 18 mph)
- Capacity: 546 passengers
- Crew: 52

SS Pacific was a wooden sidewheel steamer built in 1850 most notable for its sinking in 1875 as a result of a collision southwest of Cape Flattery, Washington. Pacific had an estimated 275 passengers and crew aboard when she sank. Only two survived. Among the casualties were several notable figures, including the vessel's captain at the time of the disaster, Jefferson Davis Howell (1841–1875), the brother-in-law of former Confederate President Jefferson Davis. The sinking of Pacific killed more people than any other marine disaster on the West Coast at the time.

== Design and construction ==
Pacific was commissioned by Major Albert Lowry, Captain Nathanial Jarvis, and her builder, William H. Brown. She was built in Brown's shipyard at the foot of Twelfth Street on the East River in New York. Her hull was oak and live oak timbers fastened together with iron and copper nails. Pacific had a vertical beam steam engine generating 275 horsepower (205 kW). Her engine had a 72-inch (1,800 mm) cylinder with a 10-foot (3.0 m) stroke. She had two coal-fired boilers. Her machinery was manufactured by the Archimedes Iron Works run by H. R. Dunham of New York.

Pacific sailed with as many as 546 passengers aboard in two classes of service. Passengers purchasing individual cabins would dine in the ship's salon, while steerage passengers had berths in common areas and ate in a separate mess.

She was launched at high water on September 24, 1850. The next day she had a gala sea trial. Captain Jarvis was in command. Also aboard were William Brown, her builder, H. R. Dunham, who supplied her machinery, General Jose Antonio Paez, exiled President of Venezuela, several other steamship captains, and other invited guests. As Pacific headed down the East River, the new steamship Franklin and the new Cunard steamer Asia raced the ship. She easily passed both ships hitting a speed of just over 16 knots (30 km/h; 18 mph). A cold lunch was served underway. The ship arrived back at her berth in the East River a 5:45 P.M. after an 85-mile (137 km) trip.

== Panama service (1850–1851) ==
Pacific sailed from New York on her first commercial voyage on October 11, 1850. She had 80 passengers aboard. She was bound for Havana and finally New Orleans, where she arrived on October 23, 1850. She took up a regular route shuttling between New Orleans, Havana, and Chagres, Panama for the Pacific Mail Steamship Company. Her schedule connected her with the company's ships sailing to San Francisco (via Panama) and New York (via Havana).

The California gold rush was in full swing at the time, and the quickest way to and from the goldfields was through Panama. Thus, Pacific had its share of dramatic cargoes. She left Chagres with 470 passengers and about $200,000 in gold dust on December 12, 1850, bound for Havana and New Orleans. Her previous trip had been even richer. She left Chagres on November 11, 1850, with $287,000 of California gold dust and 353 passengers including Prince Paul of Württemberg.

In 1850, there were no overland communications routes across North America, so news and mail from California reached the eastern United States through the steamship links at Panama. The news of Western United States brought to New Orleans by Pacific was frequently the first word of events to reach the wider world. The news was telegraphed across the country from New Orleans. While this might have been the fastest method of receiving California news, it was a slow process. For example, the most up to date newspapers that reached New Orleans aboard Pacific on February 6, 1851, were dated January 1, 1851.

== Nicaragua service (1851–1855) ==
Cornelius Vanderbilt made his fortune in regional steam boating in the New York area. When the California gold rush made shipping through Panama profitable, he saw an opportunity for improvement. He believed that a route across Nicaragua, which was closer to the United States, would prove a quicker and cheaper path to the gold fields of California. He was unable to secure financing for a canal as he had hoped, but used instead a route including the San Juan River and Lake Nicaragua. The transit time from New York to San Francisco on the new Nicaragua route was variously reported to be two to five days faster than the Panama route. Vanderbilt began buying and chartering ocean-going ships in both the Atlantic and Pacific to make the Nicaragua route a reality. He chartered Pacific from Brown for the Nicaragua to San Francisco section. She sailed under Captain David G. Bailey.

Pacific left New York on March 18, 1851, to take up her new charter. She sailed to San Francisco with a stop in Valparaíso, Chile. Pacific departed San Francisco on her first voyage as part of the new Nicaragua route on July 14, 1851. She stopped for coal in Acapulco on July 23, and reached San Juan del Sur, the Pacific end of the Nicaragua route, on July 27, 1851. Her arrival in Nicaragua was coordinated with the sailing of Vanderbilt's Prometheus, which left New York for Nicaragua, also on July 14, 1851. This inaugural run of Vanderbilt's new route did not go as planned. A $40 or $50 "transit charge" levied in Nicaragua was twice what passengers had been promised, and the mule trains which carried baggage between the steamships were likewise more expensive than advertised. Worst of all, they spent three weeks, "among the vermin, filth, and disease of Nicaragua." The outraged passengers went so far as to form a committee to publish a scathing review of the new service, although they commented favorably on Pacific's Captain Bailey.

Captain Bailey died unexpectedly while Pacific was in port at San Juan del Sur during the fall of 1851. Captain Jarvis was restored to command of the ship, at least through February 1852.

The transit problems in Nicaragua were reduced and Pacific continued her shuttles between San Francisco and San Juan del Sur for several years. In 1853, through rates leaving San Francisco on Pacific, crossing Nicaragua, and sailing to New York on another Vanderbilt steamer were: $225 for deck staterooms, $200 for staterooms opening onto the dining salon, $150 for a cabin on the lower deck, and $75 for steerage. Her cargoes were even richer than on her Panama trips. In September 1853, she left San Francisco with 460 passengers and $1.5 million in gold.

The government of Nicaragua was not strong, which may explain how Vanderbilt got his license to cross the country in the first place. By 1854, this weakness brought about threatening forces. A town near the western terminus of the Nicaragua crossing tried to collect "port fees" and impose other controls on Vanderbilt's operations which were not called for in his charter from the national government. When these demands were rebuffed, armed men from San Juan del Norte seized one of Vanderbilt's employees. The U.S. Consul attempted to negotiate the matter and was wounded in the face when a broken bottle was thrown at him. Matters escalated and the USS Cyane bombarded the defenseless town for an hour and thirty-five minutes, destroying it.

While the outcome at San Juan del Norte favored Vanderbilt's interests, the civil war that broke out in Nicaragua in 1854 did not. The national government recruited American mercenary William Walker to defend it from the rebels. He and his band of 30 mercenaries took control of the country. He seized Vanderbilt's assets in Nicaragua in March 1855, likely in collusion with Vanderbilt's erstwhile partner, Charles Morgan. Pacific continued to sail into this confusing situation until at least August 1855.

== Pacific Northwest service (1858–1869) ==
Pacific was "withdrawn" from the Nicaraguan service in early 1856. She falls out of contemporary accounts at that point. It may be that her charter was not renewed in the confusion that overtook Vanderbilt's operations after the seizure of his Nicaraguan properties. In the fall of 1858, she reappears sailing for the Pacific Mail Steamship Company between San Francisco, Portland, Puget Sound, and Victoria, British Columbia. Part of her business, and perhaps the reason for her reactivation was to ferry miners from California to the Fraser Canyon Gold Rush. She also carried troops amid escalating border tensions in the San Juan Islands with British forces. In January 1858, she embarked 260 enlisted men and 13 officers in San Francisco for Fort Vancouver on the Columbia River.

In 1859, Pacific was purchased by the California Steam Navigation Company which continued to sail her between San Francisco, Portland, Puget Sound, and Victoria. Much of her freight was agricultural. For example, she sailed from Portland to Victoria on November 15, 1861, with, "2,889 sacks flour; 991 boxes apples; 74 lbs butter; 19 boxes eggs; 28 sacks bacon; 3 barrels cider; 9 coops chickens".

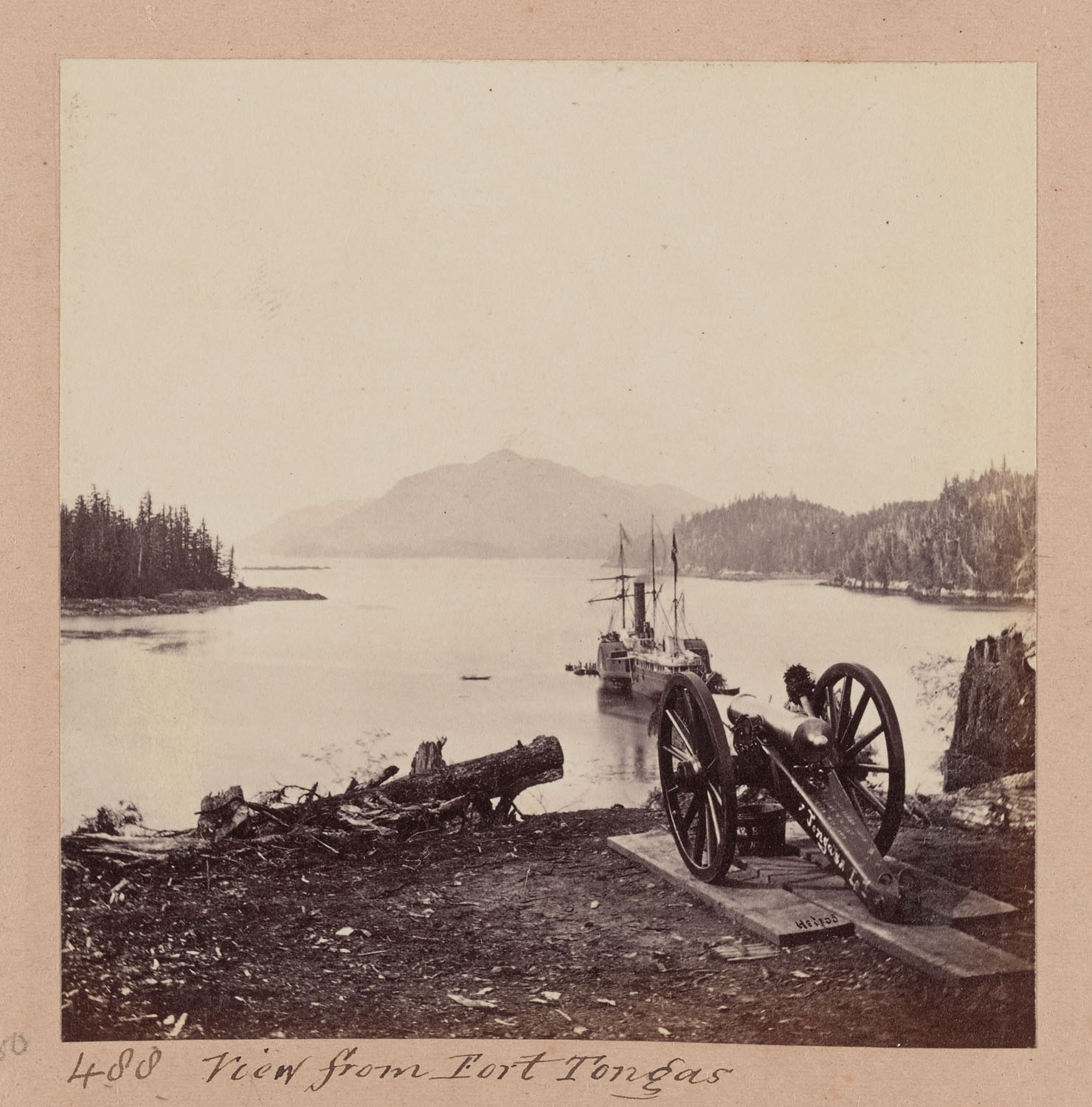
Pacific anchored before Fort Tongass in 1868 during General Halleck's inspection tour of Alaska

Pacific, under the command of Captain George W. Staples, sailed from Portland down the Columbia on July 17, 1861, headed for San Francisco. At 2 A.M. she hit Coffin Rock. At the time she was making 12 knots (22 km/h; 14 mph) through the water and had a 5-knot (9.3 km/h; 5.8 mph) current with her. The rock stove in her bow and flooding was immediate and serious. Captain Staples attempted to reach Astoria, but the flooding was too severe. Pacific continued downstream for about ten miles (16 km) and was beached on the Washington side of the river. When she came to rest, her stern was submerged to her second deck. There were 70 passengers aboard at the time. There were no deaths, but much of the cargo was destroyed. Pacific was refloated on August 2, 1861, and beached at Astoria for repairs. By the end of the year she was back in service, plying her regular route.

Steamboat rate wars raged on the West Coast of the United States in the 1860s. In order to reduce competition on the routes from San Francisco to points north, the California, Oregon, and Mexico Steamship Company acquired six ships, including Pacific, from the California Steam Navigation Company, in mid-1867. The California, Oregon and Mexico Steamship Company was reincorporated in California as the North Pacific Transportation Company in early 1869.

In 1868, a year after Alaska was acquired from Russia, Pacific was chartered for General Henry Halleck's inspection trip of the newly acquired territory. In addition to Halleck and his staff, the ship carried ordinance, commissary, and quartermaster's stores for the new military facilities. The ship departed San Francisco on July 29, 1868. The ship stopped at Fort Tongass, Sitka, and Victoria, B.C., before returning to San Francisco.

== Southern California service (1869–1874) ==
Beginning in 1869, Pacific began to mix her northward sailings to Victoria with southern voyages from San Francisco to San Diego with stops in Santa Barbara, and San Pedro. During the winter of 1869–1870, she took a two-month tourist cruise from San Francisco south to ports in the Gulf of California and then to Honolulu before returning.

In another attempt to damp down rate wars on the West Coast, the Pacific Mail Steamship company bought four steamships, including Pacific and all the Southern California business of the North Pacific Transportation Company in 1872. Pacific's sale price was $50,000. In August 1873 the ship underwent a refit in San Francisco. A new steam engine was installed which had a vertical 54-inch (1,400 mm) cylinder with a 10-foot (3.0 m) throw. This new engine provided 500 horsepower (370 kW). In yet another corporate merger aimed at reducing competition, Goodall, Nelson, and Perkins purchased the Southern California operations of the Pacific Mail Steamship Company, including Pacific in early 1875. The ship sold for $35,000. Through all this corporate turmoil, Pacific continued her regular sailings. On March 11, 1873, she arrived in San Francisco with 90,000 oranges and 25,000 lemons from groves around Los Angeles. In 1874 she was making two round-trips per month between San Francisco and San Pedro.

== Pacific Northwest service (1875) ==
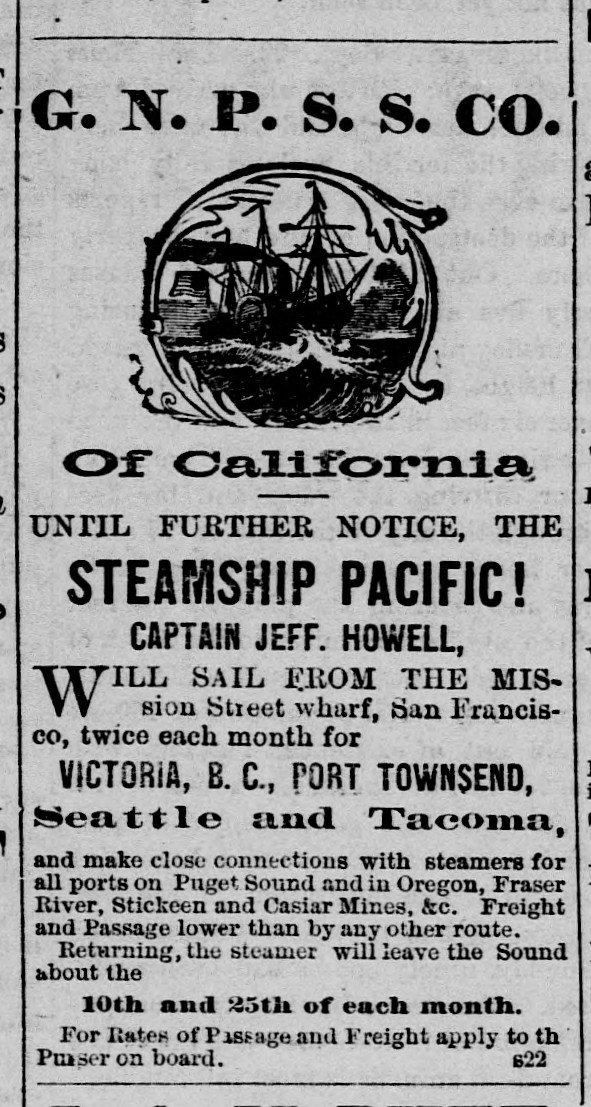
Newspaper ad for the Pacific that ran in the Puget Sound Dispatch on September 3, 1875, two months before the ship was lost.

Pacific finished her last Southern California voyages for the Pacific Mail Steamship Company in January 1875, and by May was sailing her old route from San Francisco to Victoria for Goodall, Nelson, and Perkins. The onset of the Cassiar Gold Rush in far northern British Columbia played a part in her routing. On July 1, 1875, she arrived in San Francisco with $50,629 of Canadian gold aboard. Among the notable passengers aboard in 1875 were the 173 crewmembers of the USS Saranac, which was wrecked in Seymour Narrows, British Columbia. Despite all the mergers, rates continued to be quite low. In 1875 a trip aboard Pacific from San Francisco to Olympia, Washington cost $10 in steerage and $20 for a cabin.

Captain Jefferson Davis Howell was master of Pacific when she was sunk in 1875.

=== Sinking ===
On November 4, 1875, she boarded passengers and freight in Victoria for her regular run to San Francisco. There were 52 crew aboard, led by Captain Jefferson Davis Howell. Thirty-five through passengers from Puget Sound ports were aboard and another 132 passengers bought tickets and embarked at Victoria. In addition to these ticketed passengers, an unknown number of persons rushed aboard without tickets as she left the dock. Children sailed for free and thus were also likely undercounted. Among the notable people aboard were lumberman Sewell "Sue" Moody, founder of Moodyville, Captain Otis Parsons, who had just sold off his fleet of Fraser River steamers, and J.H. Sullivan, who had been Gold Commissioner of the Cassiar mining district. Passengers also included gold miners going home before the snows hit their diggings in northern British Columbia, and 41 unidentified "Chinamen". While the official estimate was that there were 275 people aboard, there is no way to be sure, and the number of passengers may have been higher.

Her cargo on this voyage included 300 bales of hops, 2,000 sacks of oats, 250 hides, eleven casks of furs, 31 barrels of cranberries, two cases of opium, six horses, two buggies, 280 tons of coal from Puget Sound, $79,220 in gold, and about 30 tons of miscellaneous goods.

Pacific got underway from Victoria at 9:30 A.M. and sailed west, down the Strait of Juan de Fuca. She had a rough passage and had difficulty remaining on an even keel. The crew took the strange step of filling lifeboats with water to correct her list. The steamer passed Tatoosh Island at about 4 P.M and turned south along the coast. At this point she was steaming into the wind, which slowed her progress. The 1,067-ton sailing ship Orpheus was headed in the opposite direction, sailing under the command of Captain Charles Sawyer from San Francisco to pick up a load of coal at Nanaimo. The two ships collided about 25 miles (40 km) southwest of Cape Flattery at approximately 10 P.M. on November 4, 1875.

Pacific hit Orpheus near her bow on her starboard side. The two ships hit at an angle, and the bow of Pacific scraped along Orpheus' side until she passed astern. The collision was judged "light" by Sawyer. He speculated that Pacific had reversed her engines, reducing her speed and thus the force of the collision. Much of Orpheus' starboard rigging was ripped away by Pacific's bow, and she was immobilized. Unsure of the extent of the damage, Captain Sawyer ordered the ship's boats readied in case the crew had to abandon ship. A frantic 15 minutes revealed that the hull was sound and that there was no water in the hold. He ordered his men to make temporary repairs to the rigging in order to regain control over the drifting ship. Once the initial emergency had subsided, there was no sign of the steamer that had hit Orpheus. The crew began to grumble that the steamer should have stood by to help them or rescue them if they had sunk. They had no idea the steamer had been damaged, much less sunk, assuming that it had just sailed away. In a few hours Orpheus was underway again, still headed to Nanaimo.

Meanwhile, on board Pacific, a disaster was taking place. Information on these events is limited as only two people, neither of them on the bridge, survived the wreck. Neil O. Henly (1855–1944) was the ship's quartermaster, and Henry F. Jelley (1854–1930) of Port Stanley, Ontario was a passenger in British Columbia to survey possible routes for the Canadian Pacific Railway. Both men were in their bunks at the time of the collision. Henley did note that the ship's running lights were on as he retired to his cabin before the collision.

Both men felt and heard the crash as Pacific scraped along Orpheus' side. Jelley ran on deck where he was told that they had hit another vessel and "it's all right". He went back to his cabin, but by then the ship had begun to list to port. He went back on deck and found a chaotic situation. No one was steering the vessel, although the engines were still running. In consultation with Captain Howell, he fired five blue flares, a distress signal. At that point his attention turned to the lifeboats. Henly, too, raced up on deck to find all in confusion. Passengers were scrambling into lifeboats, without order. The crew threw one man overboard who refused to leave a lifeboat. Many boats were without oars; some still had water in them from the attempt to trim the ship, and the crew was unable to launch most of them. Henly and the chief engineer managed to launch one boat, but it immediately capsized. Jelley was in the only other boat that either man saw launched. Pacific had listed so far to port that this boat was set down on the water without having been lowered from its davits. As soon as it was cut loose from the ship, it filled with water and capsized. At this point – Jelley estimated an hour after the collision – Pacific broke in two and the ship's smokestack fell on the capsized boat. The pieces of the ship promptly sank.

After Pacific went under, Henly reported that the water was filled with "a floating mass of human beings, whose screams for help were fearful, but which soon ceased". Most succumbed to hypothermia or drowning. A few, including Jelly and Henly, managed to climb up out of the water onto broken parts of the ship. Women in fashionable dresses with yards of material were at a disadvantage as they were weighed down by their water-logged clothes. Jelley survived by clinging to a piece of the wheelhouse with a miner from Maine who had been in the Cariboo goldfields and, like Jelley, was on his way home to the eastern part of the continent via the transcontinental railway from San Francisco. Jelley's companion succumbed to exposure as the wreckage drifted closer to Vancouver Island. Only three miles from shore, Jelley was rescued by the American bark Messenger at 10 A.M. on November 6, 1875. He was brought ashore at Port Townsend, Washington, weak from exposure. His rescue was the first indication the rest of the world had that Pacific had sunk. A number of vessels, including USRC Wolcott were dispatched to look for survivors.

Henly's impromptu raft also carried Captain Howell, the second mate, a cook, and four passengers including a young lady. Waves washed some off the raft, and others died of exposure, leaving Henly alone. He was finally rescued by the Wolcott at 3 A.M. on November 8, 1875.

Orpheus continued her voyage north after the collision, intending to turn east into the Strait of Juan de Fuca once she passed the Cape Flattery lighthouse. Somehow she missed that light. Instead, the mate on watch saw the Cape Beale Light further to the north. This lighthouse had only operated for a few months and none of the officers on board knew about it. They assumed it was Cape Flattery, turned east, and wrecked their ship In Barclay Sound, near Copper (Tzartus) Island, on the west coast of Vancouver Island. Some of her crew reached the shore, and others were rescued by Wolcott, which was still looking for survivors from Pacific. Wolcott's officers examined the wreck of Orpheus and confirmed Sawyer's account that Pacific had hit her near the bow and scraped along her starboard side.

A coroner's inquest on some of the bodies recovered was held in Victoria in late November 1875. Henly and Jelley testified, as did Captain Sawyer and some of Orpheus' crew.

All of Pacific's officers and most of her crew were killed in the event, and Captain Sawyer of Orpheus was below at the beginning of the incident so details of the collision are necessarily incomplete. Nonetheless, the surviving accounts and the results of the inquests into the sinking present a fairly clear picture. Orpheus was sailing north in a fine rain. A fresh wind out of the south sped her on her way at 12 knots. It was dark and Sawyer was uncertain just how far his ship was from the coast to his east, so he trimmed his sails so he could fall off to the west at a moment's notice. Sawyer went below at 9:30 P.M. to consult his charts, leaving the ship under the command of the second mate with instructions to fall off to the west if he spotted anything; the mate did so when he spotted a light on his port bow that he thought was the Cape Flattery lighthouse. Had he been correct, his action would have saved the ship from wrecking on the rocky shore; however, the light was Pacific's, and by turning to the west, Orpheus ran directly in front of the approaching steamer.

==== Potential causes of the disaster ====
The various inquests agreed that the proximate cause of the sinking was Orpheus crossing in front of Pacific. This simple and obvious conclusion left many questions unanswered, and rumors created new ones.

===== Collision avoidance =====
Orpheus clearly steered into the collision, but many speculated that Pacific could have avoided it. While no one from Pacific's bridge survived to tell what the ship did to avoid the collision, several facts illuminate the issue. First, crew members of both vessels reported seeing the lights of the other. The ships had their running lights on, and visibility was adequate for them to be seen. Second, Jelley reported hearing the bells for the engine telegraph go to "stop" after the collision. This throws doubt onto Sawyer's speculation that Pacific slowed prior to the collision. Third, Sawyer claimed that he saw no lookouts on Pacific's deck and Jelly claimed the crew were all asleep below; the Victoria inquest faulted Pacific for inadequate lookouts. A lack of lookouts may have delayed the recognition of the approaching collision until it was too late for Pacific to take action. Finally, Sawyer reported that Pacific blew its whistle, presumably as a warning, 30 seconds before the collision, but appeared not to take evasive action even though it had announced its understanding of the immediate danger.

===== Seaworthiness of Pacific =====
There was much sentiment that a glancing blow that did no damage to Orpheus' hull should not have sunk a well-found ship, much less cause her to break into pieces. The New York Times was particularly strident, commenting, "The sinking of the steamer Pacific by collision with a sailing vessel was a fair example of the worthlessness of some of the hulls now afloat. That collision might have been avoided is very true; but there is no possible excuse for the breaking up of a vessel by such a blow as that given by the Orpheus. The steamer's bow was crushed in like glass, on receiving a blow delivered obliquely. It is a perversion of language to call such a ship 'seaworthy." There were calls for greater steamboat regulation, criticism of the Steamboat Inspection Service, and some questions raised about the lack of maintenance on ships caused by the relentless fare wars.

The use of water-filled life rafts to trim Pacific, as reported by Jelly, indicates that she had stability problems well before the collision. If she already had water in her hold, and was overloaded or the cargo was mis-stowed, this could have caused the ship to capsize more quickly once flooding began after the collision.

===== Captain Howell =====
Captain Howell was only 34 years old at the time of the sinking, and there were questions raised about his competence and experience. The fact that he was the brother-in-law of former Confederate President Jefferson Davis, no doubt created a cloud of ill-feeling around him, but his experience as a mariner was comparable to other steamboat captains at the time. He studied at the US Naval Academy prior to the outbreak of the American Civil War and commanded a gunboat for the Confederate Navy for two years. He came to California in 1869 and began a commercial steamboat career. He commanded ships for the Pacific Mail Steamship Company, and the Oregon Steamship Company. Immediately prior to joining Goodall, Nelson, and Perkins, Howell had been captain of the North Pacific Transportation Company's steamers Idaho, Montana, Pelican and others.

=== Aftermath ===
By the time that Captain Sawyer embarked for California, the world had discovered that Pacific was sunk with huge loss of life, and that Orpheus had sailed away without attempting a rescue. He was vilified in the press. It was speculated that Captain Sawyer had wrecked his ship on purpose either to "eliminate the evidence" or to collect on his insurance, since his normal profits would not be sufficient to repair the damages from the collision. He was arrested, but an inquest in San Francisco exonerated him. Sawyer died at Port Townsend in 1894.

The wreck of Orpheus was sold for $385 to J. J. Hunt, who hired a crew to salvage what he could. In January 1893 her anchors and chain were salvaged.

== Wreck discovery and recovery ==
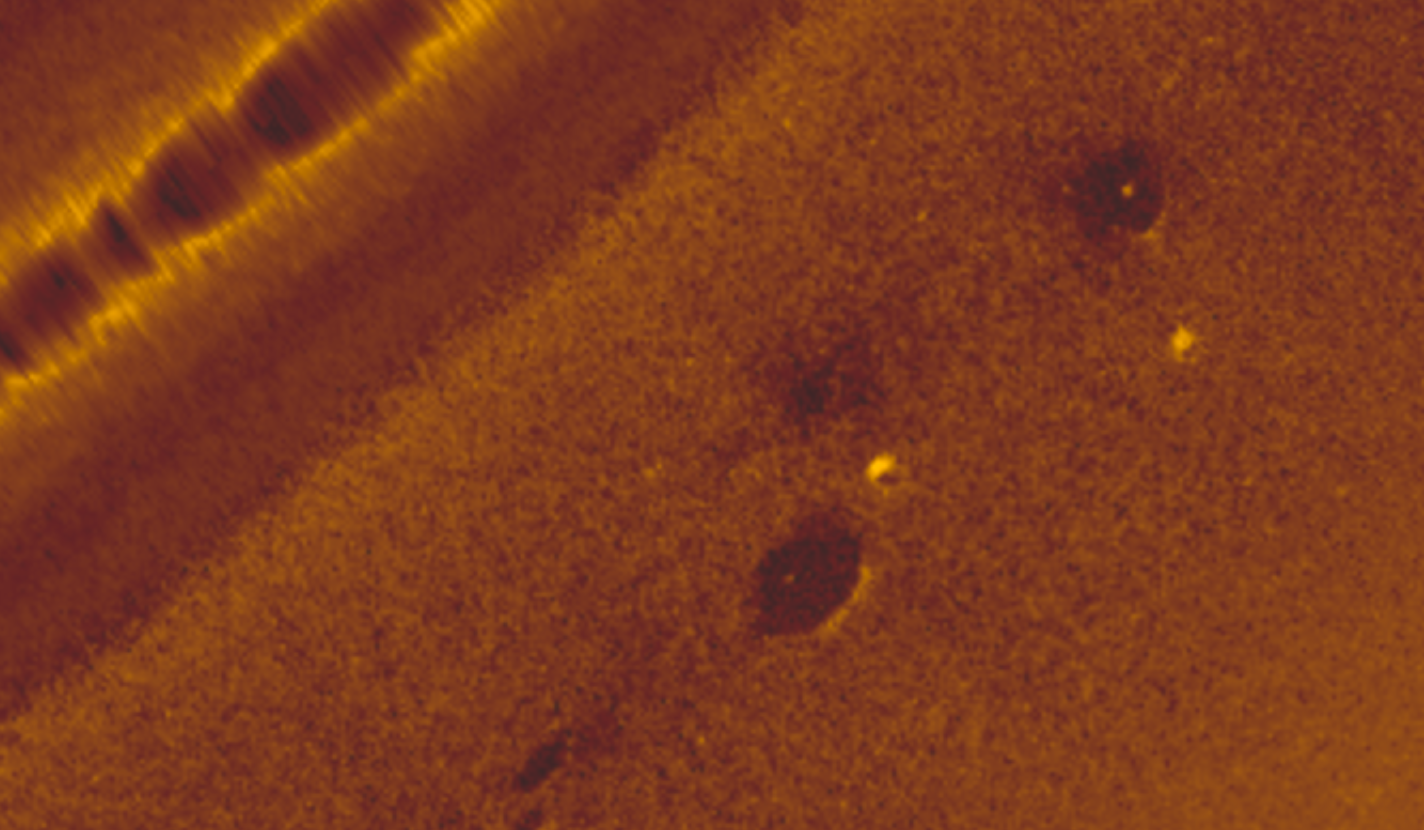
This is a sonar image of Pacific's two paddlewheels lying in the silt. The bright spot in the center of each is likely the drive shaft poking out of the mud. The depressions are 8 meters in diameter, matching the size of Pacific's paddlewheels. The two bright spots near the paddlewheels are bits of fishing gear that snagged on the drive shafts and ripped away.

Pacific's cargo included at least 200 pounds (91 kg) of gold, sparking the interest of treasure hunters. Given the historical significance of the ship and its loss, others have been interested in the wreck from an archeological perspective as well. At least six different parties have mounted searches for the wreck of the Pacific since 1993. The wreck has proven hard to locate for a variety of reasons. First, it is certain that the mariners on Orpheus did not know precisely where they were and thus could not accurately report the position of the collision. Second, almost no one survived from Pacific, and certainly none of the deck officers who might have been able to report the position of the sinking. Third, the water is deep and the bottom uneven in the area of the sinking. Finally, after over a century on the sea floor, the wooden hull and other organic matter in the wreck would have decomposed leaving little more than a flat debris field, some of which was likely covered in silt.

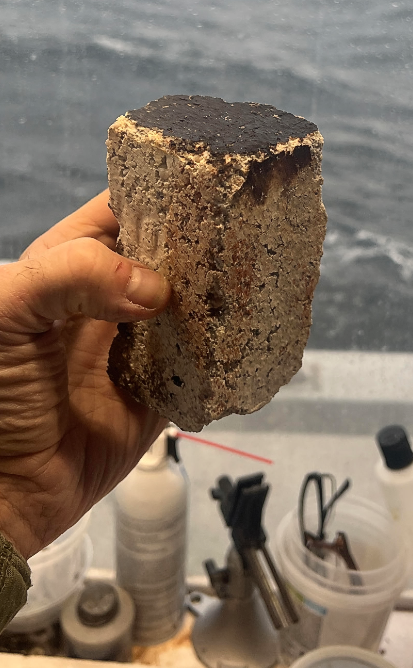
This fire brick was recovered from the wreck site. Pacific's boilers certainly used this type of material. Note the dark soot on the end that faced the coal fires.

Rockfish, Inc. is a for-profit corporation which was launched in 2016 with the goal of locating and salvaging Pacific. Through 2022, $2.1 million has been invested in Rockfish by 45 people. Jeff Hummel, president of Rockfish, pursued a number of clues to narrow the search area off the Washington coast. Bottom-trawling fishermen provided one clue. Some brought up chunks of coal in their nets. Since coal is not found naturally on the sea floor, Rockfish had a chemical analysis completed on one of the recovered rocks. It matched the composition of coal from a mine in Coos Bay, Oregon that was owned by Goodall, Nelson, and Perkins, suggesting that it may have come from Pacific's bunkers. Acting on this and other clues, in the summer of 2021, Rockfish located what it believed to be the wreck using side-scan sonar. In follow-up surveys during the summer and fall of 2022, the wreck was photographed using a deep-diving remotely operated underwater vehicle, and a number of artifacts were brought to the surface.

In November 2022, Rockfish filed for salvage rights to the ship based on its sonar data, photography, and artifact evidence. On November 23, 2022, the United States District Court in Western Washington granted exclusive salvage rights to the wreck to Rockfish for 12 months. In order to renew its exclusive salvage rights, Rockfish is required by the Court to diligently undertake the salvage of the ship. The wreck discovered by Rockfish has not been definitively identified as Pacific. Nonetheless, the Court found the evidence sufficiently persuasive that it ordered the public notice of the grant of salvage rights to characterize it as "currently believed to be S.S. Pacific".

Rockfish plans further expeditions to the wreck site in the fall of 2023, and the summers of 2024, and 2025. Recovery of additional artifacts will begin with the debris field surrounding the remains of the ship, and then progress to the wreck itself.

The Northwest Shipwreck Alliance is a non-profit corporation headed by Matthew McCauley, a long-time partner of Jeff Hummel in numerous salvage efforts. Rockfish, Inc. and its investors are entitled to any profits from any gold or other treasure recovered, but have entered into an agreement to donate all other artifacts recovered to Northwest Shipwreck Alliance. It announced its desire to display recovered artifacts in an appropriate museum setting.

== Captains ==
Historical documents provide a partial list of Pacific's captains:

- Nathaniel Jarvis: 1850, 1851, 1852
- Captain David G. Bailey: 1851
- Captain Bodfish: 1851
- Captain Seabury: 1851, 1853, 1854
- Captain P. E. Lefevre: 1852, 1853
- Captain Edgar L. Wakeman: 1855
- Captain Robert Haley: 1858
- Captain C. P. Patterson: 1859 1860
- Captain George W. Staples: 1861
- Captain A. M. Burns: 1855 1862
- Captain Hewitt: 1869
- Captain Connor: 1869
- Captain F. C. Scholl: 1870, 1875
- Captain Peter Mackie: 1872
- Captain G. D. Korts: 1874
- Captain Thomas Stothard: 1874
- Captain Jefferson Davis Howell: 1875

== See also ==
- Graveyard of the Pacific
- List of ships in British Columbia
