= School District 64 Gulf Islands =

School district in British Columbia, Canada

Location
- Salt Spring Island Southern Gulf Islands Canada

District information
- Superintendent: Jill Jensen
- Schools: 10
- Budget: CA$14.1 million

Students and staff
- Students: 1659

Other information
- Website: www.sd64.bc.ca

School District 64 Gulf Islands is a school district in British Columbia. It includes the islands off southern Vancouver Island in the Strait of Georgia. This includes Salt Spring Island as well as Galiano, Mayne, Saturna, Pender Islands. It also recently went through a reconfiguration causing the outer island kids grade 8 and up to go to Pender for 3 years and then to Salt Spring.

== History ==
One of the earliest school districts was established on Salt Spring Island. The Salt Spring Island School District was created in 1869 in the Colony of Vancouver Island prior to the island colony joining mainland British Columbia.

== Schools ==
School	Location	Grades
Fernwood Elementary School	Salt Spring Island	K-7
Fulford Community Elementary School	Salt Spring Island	K-7
Galiano Community School	Galiano Island	K-7
Gulf Islands Secondary School	Salt Spring Island	8-12
[Mayne Elem-Jr Secondary School]	Mayne Island	K-7
Pender Islands Elem-Secondary School	Pender Island	K-12
Phoenix Elementary School (Salt Spring)	Salt Spring Island	K-7
Salt Spring Elementary School	Salt Spring Island	K-7
Saturna Island Elementary School	Saturna Island	K-7

== See also ==
- List of school districts in British Columbia
