= Dease Creek =

Creek in British Columbia, Canada

Coordinates: 58°41′59″N 130°5′36″W

Dease Creek is a creek located in the Stikine Region of British Columbia. This creek flows into the west side of Dease Lake. Dease Creek was first staked for gold in 1873 by the Moores. The creek was staked for 16 miles and in 1874 supported 700 miners. Mining companies such as Three to One, Preseverence, Canadian, Caledonia, and Baronovitch worked the creek. The total yield for the first five years was $1,054,400.00. The largest gold nugget recovered was in 1875 and weighed 50 ounces. By 1876 Chinese miners controlled most of the creek. The creek was considered to be mined out by 1880.
