= Surprise (clipper) =

Ship built in East Boston in 1850

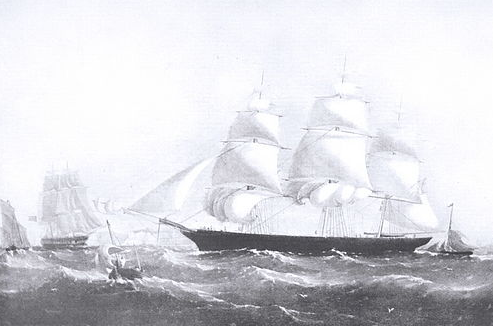
- Surprise

History

United States
- Name: Surprise
- Owner: A. A. Low & Brother
- Builder: Samuel Hall, East Boston, MA
- Launched: 5 October 1850
- Fate: Wrecked in 1876

General characteristics
- Class & type: Clipper
- Tonnage: 1262 or 1361 tons
- Length: 183 or 190 ft.
- Beam: 38 or 39 ft.
- Draft: 22 ft.
- Complement: A captain, "30 able seamen, 6 ordinary seamen, 4 boys, 2 boatswains, a carpenter, a sailmaker, 2 cooks, a steward, and 4 mates." Captain Philip Dumaresq, 1850-1852, Captain Charles A. Ranlett, 1852-1876.

Surprise was a California clipper built in East Boston in 1850. It initially rounded Cape Horn to California, but the vessel's owners, A. A. Low & Brother, soon found that the vessel performed well in Far Eastern waters. From that point onward the vessel spent much of her working life in the China trade, although the vessel also made three trips from the East Coast of the United States to California.

Surprise served as a clipper-rigged ship for 17 years, from 1850 until 1867, giving her an exceptionally long working life with this demanding rigging. After her sail plan was cut down in 1867, removing her skysails, she entered a second life as a slower merchant sailing ship from 1867 until her loss in 1876.

== Early history ==
=== Launch in Boston ===
As with many Boston-built clipper ships, Surprise was fully built and rigged in her port of origin, but was towed to the East Coast's shipping hub, New York City, to take on its first long-distance cargo. The ship's owner, and the New York reporters who covered the new ship's arrival from Boston, were impressed with the clipper's appearance and measurements.

Arthur Hamilton clark described the ship as fully rigged on the stocks, with all her gear rove off. She was launched with her three skysail yards across and colors flying, which attracted a multitude of people. When Surprise arrived at New York to load for San Francisco, the New York Herald declared that she was the handsomest ship ever seen in the port.

"Her ends were said to be quite sharp," another account reads, "but she was not quite as large and did not carry as much sail as other clippers of her era, such as Game Cock, Sea Serpent and White Squall. The Lows were delighted with her and gave Samuel Hall a $2,500 bonus."

Surprise was 190 feet long, with a breadth of 39 feet and a depth of 22 feet. Her main-yard was 78 feet long from boom-iron to boom-iron, and her mainmast was 84 feet from heel to cap, with other spars in proportion. She was beautifully fitted throughout. She was painted black from the water-line up. The figurehead was a finely carved and gilded flying eagle, and the stern was ornamented with the arms of New York.

=== Arrival in New York ===
The new clipper's arrival from Boston drew a significant number of spectators. The steamer R. B. Forbes towed the ship to its loading berth in New York.

The ship's owners underwrote an organized celebration of the arrival of the new ship in New York City for service to California. Receptions of this sort were intended to help "sell" the new clipper's (relatively high-priced) shipping services to New York merchants and wholesalers. The steamer-towboat R.B. Forbes was an integral element in gatherings of this type. "The R. B. Forbes ... was generally on hand at launches, regattas, and Fourth of July celebrations," our historian reports, "with a jolly party of Boston underwriters and their friends on board ... With a rainbow of bunting over her mastheads, the brass band in full blast, and champagne corks flying about her deck, she contributed liberally to the gayety of many festive occasions. She was also usually the first to introduce a new-born ship to the end of a manila hawser, and for several years she towed most of the eastern-built clippers to their loading berth at Boston or New York."

== Voyages and records set ==
Surprise was one of the most profitable clipper ships ever constructed. On her first voyage she sailed to San Francisco in 96 days and 15 hours, beating the record set by Sea Witch, by one day. Surprise arrived to California with 1,800 tons of cargo, making $78,000 in freight fees. From there she sailed to China.

On her third trip, when she arrived in London with a freight of tea from Canton, China on the 12th of November 1851, the profit was calculated at $50,000. On average at that time a clipper would pay for its construction cost in one passage.

Surprise made eleven consecutive passages from China to New York in eighty-nine days or less, six from Hong-Kong, five from Shanghai." Her fastest passage was eighty-one days, from Shanghai, in 1857.

== Race home from China ==
There were several famous races home from China. Once the British clippers Chrysolite and Stornaway, and the American clippers Race Horse, Surprise, and Challenge raced from Canton to Liverpool and Deal. The ships arrived at the home ports as follows: At Liverpool, Chrysolite in 106 days; at Deal, Stornaway in 109 days; Challenge in 105 days; Surprise in 106 days.

== Ice trade and mutiny ==
In his letters, Marcus L. Woodard described his 1861 voyage from New York City to Batavia aboard Surprise. The ship was carrying a cargo of ice. The secessionist crew mutinied when the ship arrived at Batavia.

== Loss and salvage ==
Surprise encountered a heavy gale in Kaneda Bay, off Yokohama, Japan on February 4, 1876, and struck an underwater rock. Four days later, the ship was found. It was floating bottom up. The ship itself was a total loss, but 10,000 cases of kerosene it was carrying were salvaged. No deaths were reported. Responsibility for the mishap was placed on an "unqualified pilot, who boarded the ship off the entrance to Tokyo Bay."

== Logbooks ==
- Surprise (Ship) Logbook, 1854-1856
- Abstract Log of Clipper-Ship Surprise from Shanghai to New York, 4th voyage, 1857
- Surprise (Ship) Logbook, 1861-1862
