= Laketon, British Columbia =

Laketon
- Location of Laketon in British Columbia
- Coordinates: 58°42′00″N 130°06′00″W
- Country: Canada
- Province: British Columbia
- Area codes: 250, 778

Laketon is a locality and former mining camp on the west shore of Dease Lake in the Cassiar Country of far northern British Columbia, Canada. It is located at the mouth of Dease Creek. Once known for the hanging of two murderers and their bodies buried at the crossroad to serve as a warning to all. Gold was first found on Dease Creek in 1873, with Captain William Moore among the first to stake a claim.
