= J. H. Sullivan =

John Howe Sullivan
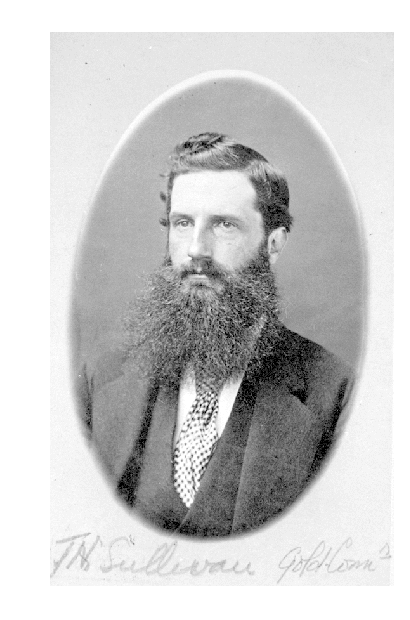
- J.H. Sullivan
- Born: c. 1843
- Died: November 4, 1875; Near Cape Flattery, Washington
- Occupation: Gold Commissioner

John Howe Sullivan (c. 1843 - 4 November 1875) was the Gold Commissioner for the Cassiar District in the Canadian province of British Columbia during the Cassiar Gold Rush of the 1870s. He held this position from 26 May 1874 until his death.

Sullivan was one of those lost in the sinking of the SS Pacific off Cape Flattery on November 4, 1875.
