= Saturna Ecological Education Centre =

Coordinates: 48.79431°N 123.17358°W

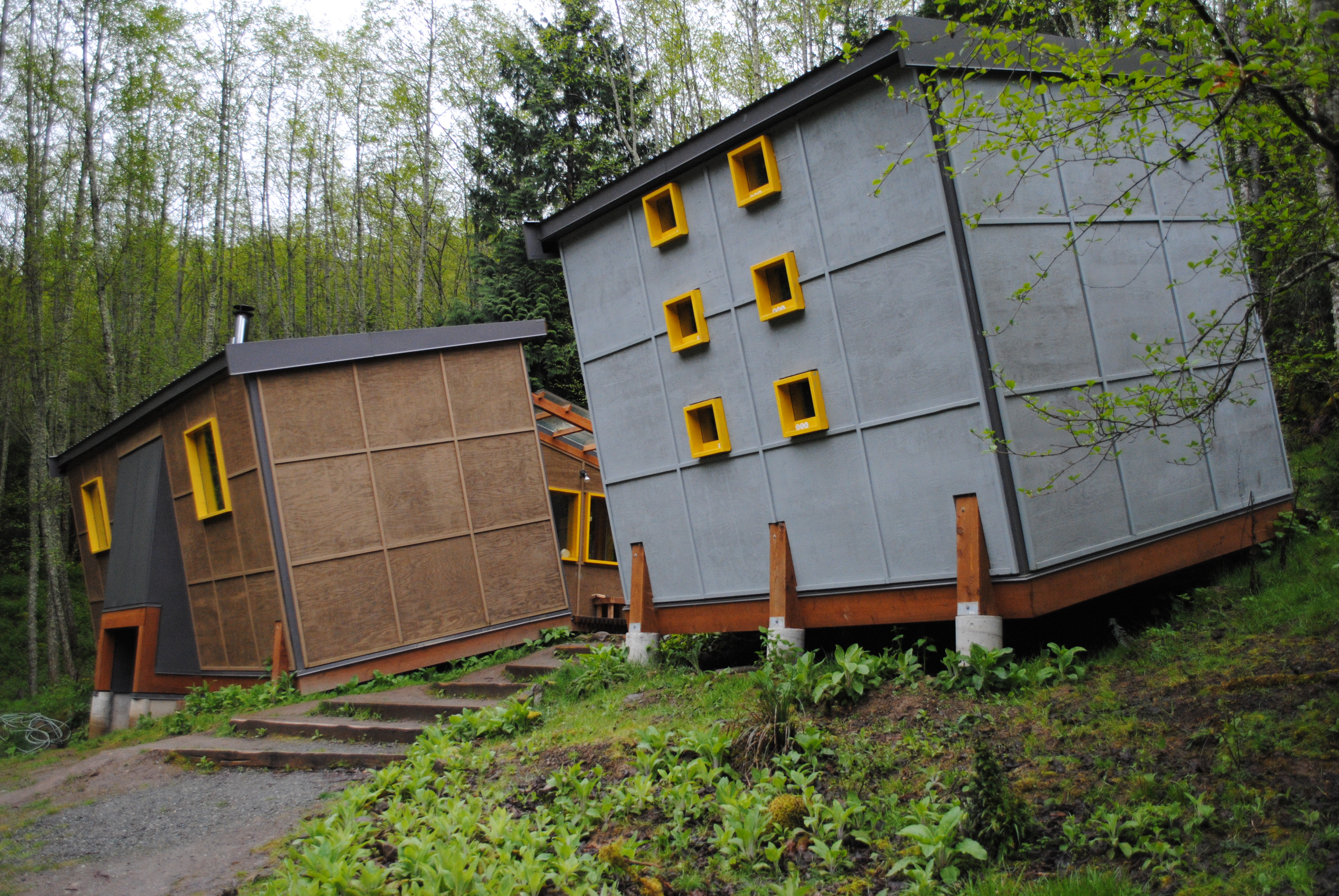
- Slate cabin and main room of the Saturna Ecological Education Centre.
- Saturna Island; Capital Regional District; British Columbia

Information
- Type: Public high school
- School district: SD64
- Student to teacher ratio: 1:8

The Saturna Ecological Education Centre (SEEC) is a publicly funded outdoor school located on Saturna Island in British Columbia. It is part of School District #64. It operates three days a week, with students sleeping over on Saturna during the week. The education style at SEEC is very different from that of a conventional school, although it does adhere to the provincially required learning outcomes. Its name is commonly shortened to "SEEC."

== Education style ==
The style of learning at SEEC is very different from the style taught at most high schools around the province. Classes are typically multi-disciplinary and often held outdoors. For example, students may go for a hike up a mountain, navigating via GPS, and then write a reflection on the experience. This will complete prescribed learning outcomes from a variety of courses, including PE, Geography, and English. Typically, each semester will focus on four courses, with students also having the freedom to create an IDS. An IDS, or Independent Directed Study, is a course that a student can independently design according to their own interests, as long as it follows at least one Prescribed Learning Outcome of at least one provincially recognized course.

== Awards ==
Winners of the 2017 BC Green Games $1000 grant.
