= Stag Hound =

Extreme clipper ship that sailed from 1851 to 1861

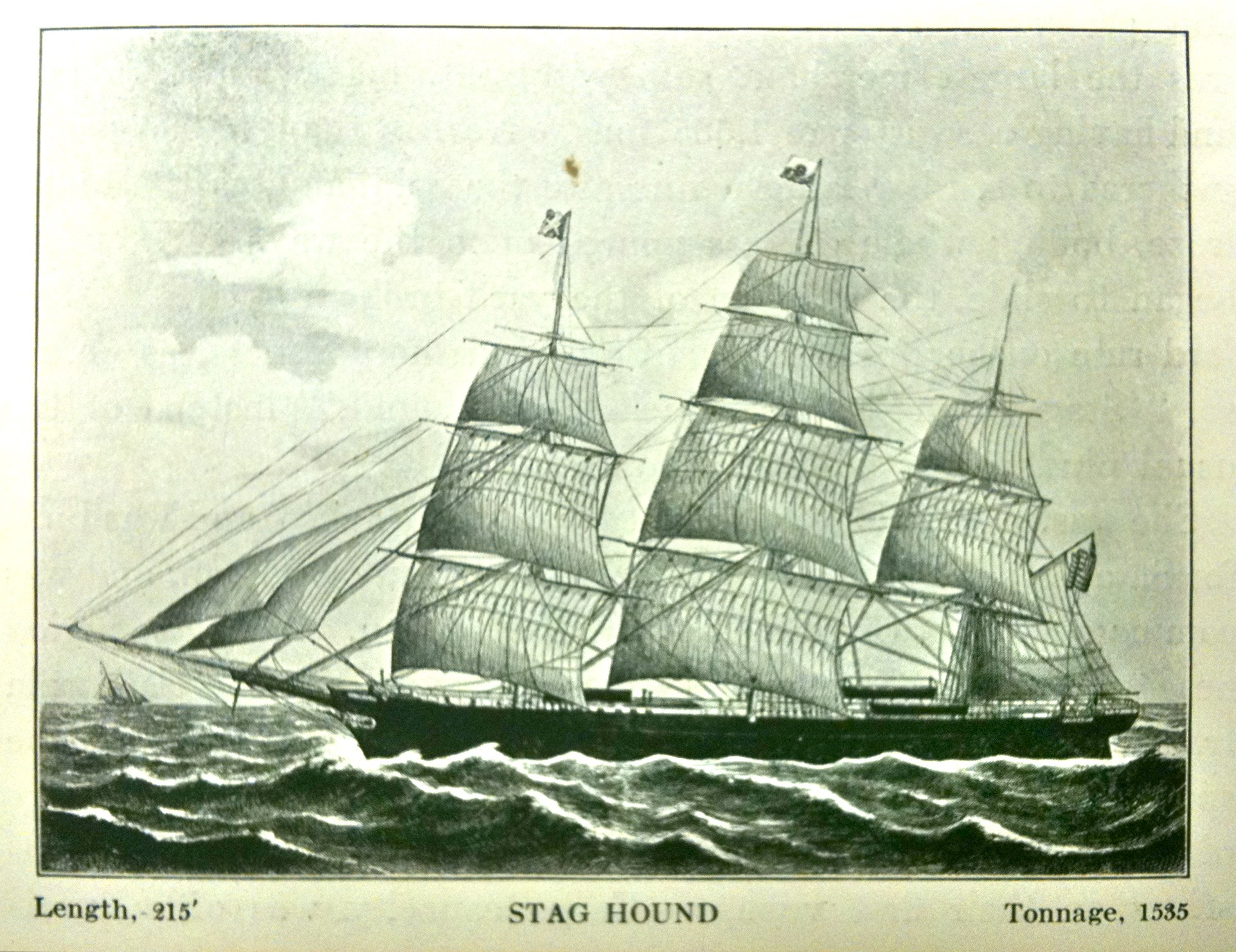
- Stag Hound

History

United States
- Name: Stag Hound
- Owner: George B. Upton, Sampson & Tappan, Boston
- Builder: Donald McKay, East Boston
- Launched: 7 December 1850
- Fate: Burned, 2 August 1861

General characteristics
- Type: Extreme clipper
- Tons burthen: 1534 tons OM, 1100 tons British measurement
- Length: 226 ft. LOA
- Beam: 39 ft. 8 in.
- Depth of hold: 21 ft.
- Sail plan: Nearly 11,000 square yards of canvas under full sail; foremast, mainmast, and mizzen.
- Complement: 36 ABs, 6 ordinary seamen, and 4 boys on maiden voyage under Capt. Josiah Richardson, Feb. 1, 1851

Stag Hound was launched on December 7, 1850, in East Boston, Massachusetts. Designed by shipbuilder Donald McKay for the California trade, she was briefly the largest merchant ship in the world. She was in active service from 1851 until her total loss in 1861.

Stag Hound was to be the only true extreme clipper built by Donald McKay. He built many other clippers for speed, but no other clipper hulls were to have the 40" dead rise from half floor that this ship was to have. Many of his other ships are loosely called 'extreme' clippers, but after Stag Hound McKay changed his hull design concept; his yard focused on flat-floored medium clippers masted and sparred for speed up to, and even equal to, an extreme clipper hull.

== Construction and history ==
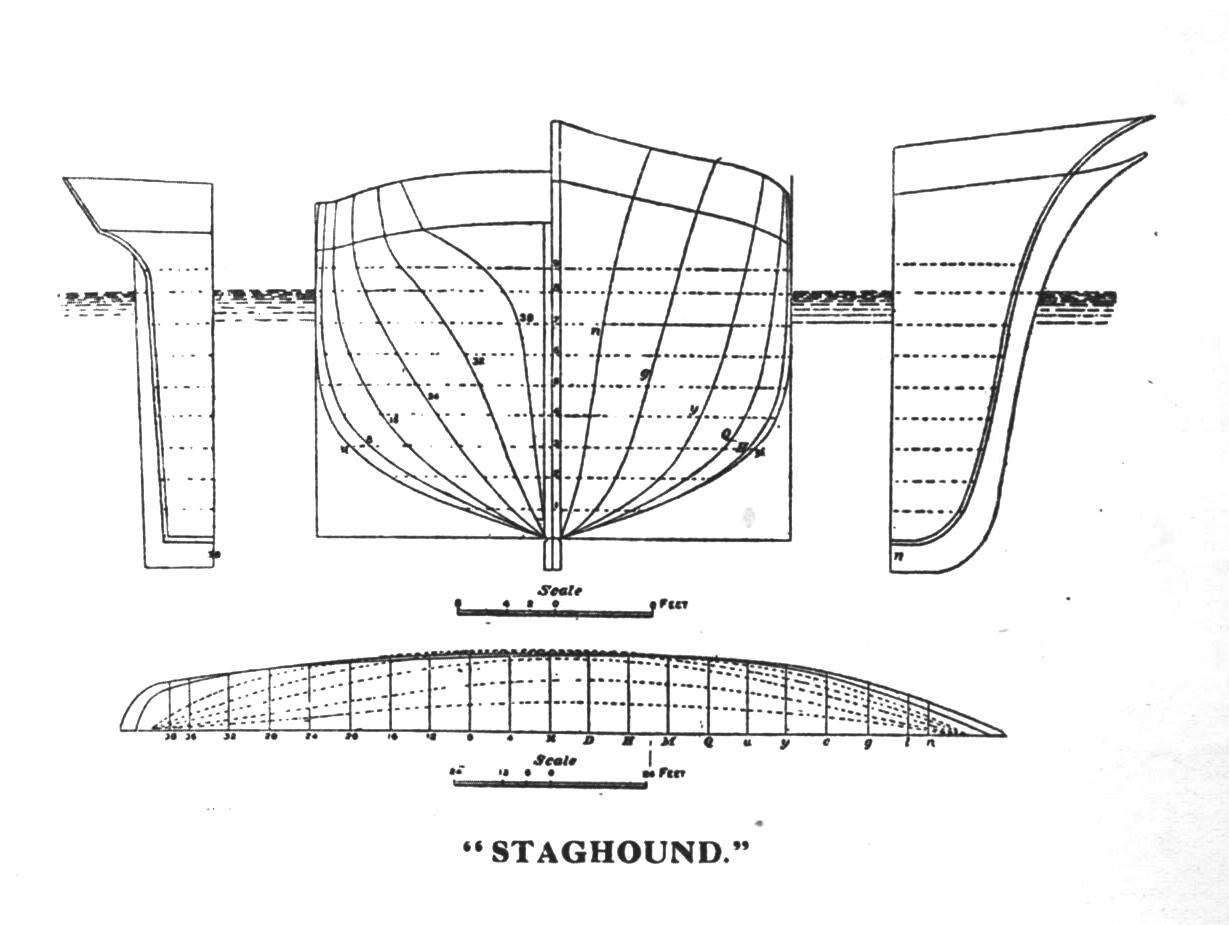
Lines of Stag Hound

The commercial success of U.S. clipper ships in the China trade in the 1840s, closely followed by the California gold rush of 1849, made it possible for the designs of square-rigged merchant ships to reach their culmination of development. Merchant firms such as Boston's Sampson & Tappan were able to venture the capital necessary to build extreme clippers, a type of vessel longer, with taller masts, more heavily sparred, and with sharper lines than any built before this time. Enoch Train contracted McKay to build Stag Hound for himself, but sold it to Grinnell, Minturn & Co of New York for $90,000 before its launch. With the money in hand, McKay and his men built Stag Hound in only 100 days in late 1850.

"Designed and built by Donald McKay at East Boston, her model was original. The entrance and clearance lines were very long and sharp, slightly convex." The "Boston Atlas" of 1851 described Stag Hound as follows: "Her model may be said to be the original of a new idea in naval architecture ... She is longer and sharper than any other vessel of the merchant service in the world, while her breadth of beam and depth of hold are designed with special reference to stability."

She was built to carry 1,600 registered tons' burden, several hundred tons of freight capacity greater than any other vessel then being built for the California trade. Almost all of the manufactured goods consumed in the California gold fields had to be carried from the United States East Coast.

== Launch ==
"When she was launched, the Stag Hound was the largest merchant ship ever built, being 215 feet long, and having a register of 1,535 tons. No less than 15,000 people gathered to see her launched despite the cold, and, as the tallow froze, boiling whale oil was poured upon the ways."

Jane Lyon wrote this description of the launch in 1962, based on contemporary journalistic accounts:

The bells of Boston pealing noon were echoed by the sound of hammers knocking away the blocks. The watchers held their breath as the great ship stirred. "There she goes!" they cried, and the foreman smashed a bottle of rum across her forefoot. "Stag Hound!" he shouted, "Your name's Stag Hound!" She slid gracefully into the water. Cheering reverberated across the bay; a cannon roared; a band played loudly.

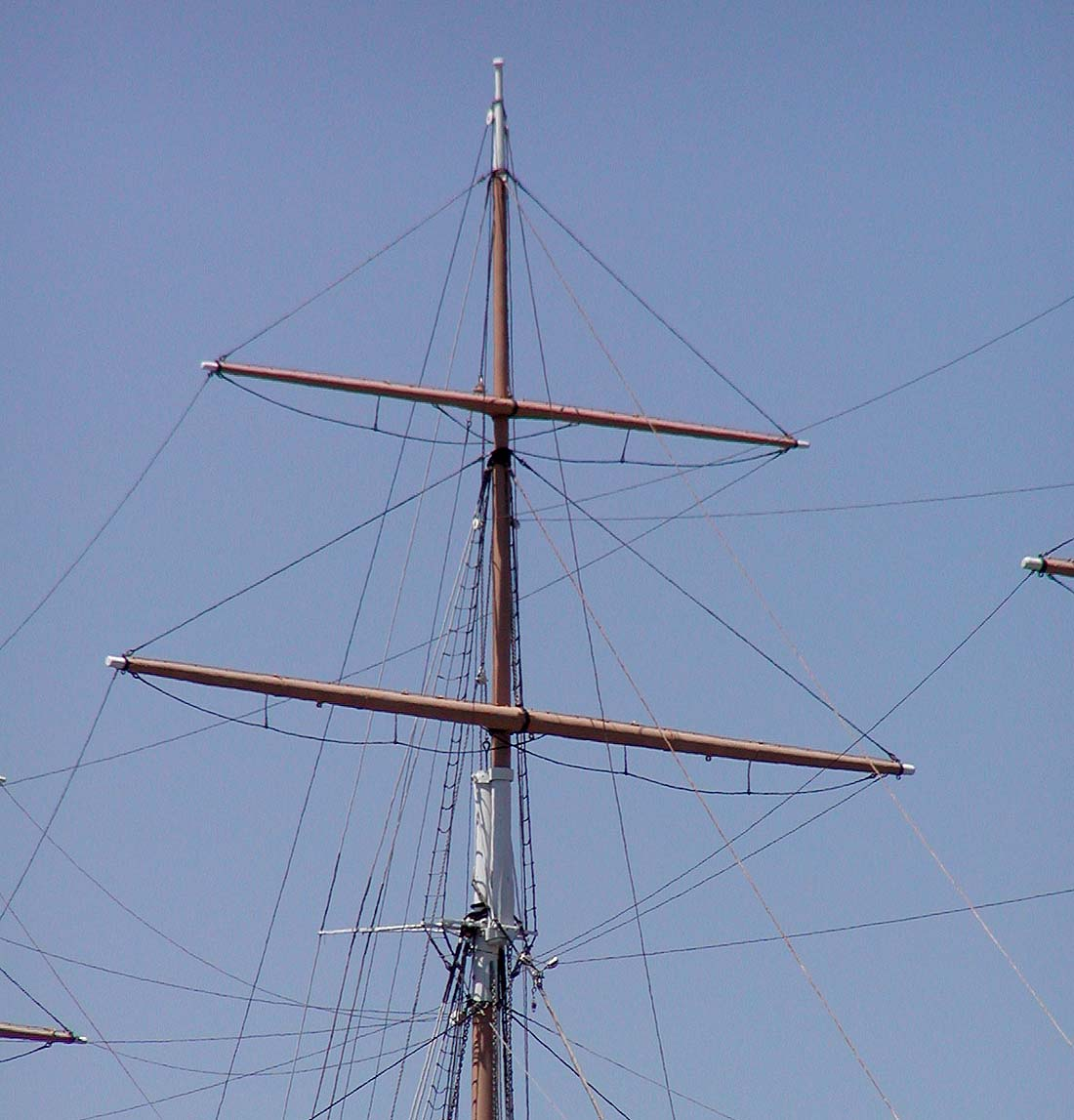
Main topgallant mast

== Performance ==
On many of her voyages, the ship did not meet with favorable winds; nevertheless "in moderate breezes she was conceded to be a very fast ship and in strong winds frequently logged 16 and 17 knots. Her best day’s run ... was 358 miles."

== Race to San Francisco, 1851 ==
Stag Hound

Stag Hound sailed from New York City on February 1, 1851, for San Francisco with a crew of 46 men. Her captain was Josiah Richardson (1808–1852). She was so heavily sparred that, at full sail, she carried almost 6,000 square yards of canvas. This was more sail area than most able seamen and their officers knew how to handle in those days, and after only six days, a gale blew out her main topmast and all three topgallant masts. Despite this mishap, she beat John Bertram and Sea Serpent to Valparaíso. Stag Hound's crew raised a jury rig and reached California in 113 days (108 days at sea and 5 days in port), a very fast time for a partly dismasted vessel. Stag Hound then proceeded to Guangdong to load a cargo of tea. The entire round-the-world voyage earned a profit of $80,000 above her construction cost.

== Mutiny ==
“Up till the time of her loss the Stag Hound seems to have been unusually free from accidents. True, she lost spars on her first voyage, but so did most all the early clippers and her after record shows that the underwriters were seldom called on ... She had one mutiny on board, at Anjer, in 1860, where the first and second mate were reported stabbed by members of the crew. Captain Hussey was in command at the time."

== Burning ==
A fire broke out on board about 45 mi. south of Pernambuco, Aug. 2, 1861, at 1 AM, as the ship was en route from Sunderland, England under Capt. Wilson, bound for San Francisco with a cargo of coal. The crew was able to contain the fire until 5 PM, when they had launched four lifeboats and salvaged what was possible. At that point, the ship burned rapidly, and within one hour the masts went over the side. The lifeboats and crew put in at Pernambuco the following morning.
