= Dease Lake (British Columbia) =

Lake in Canada

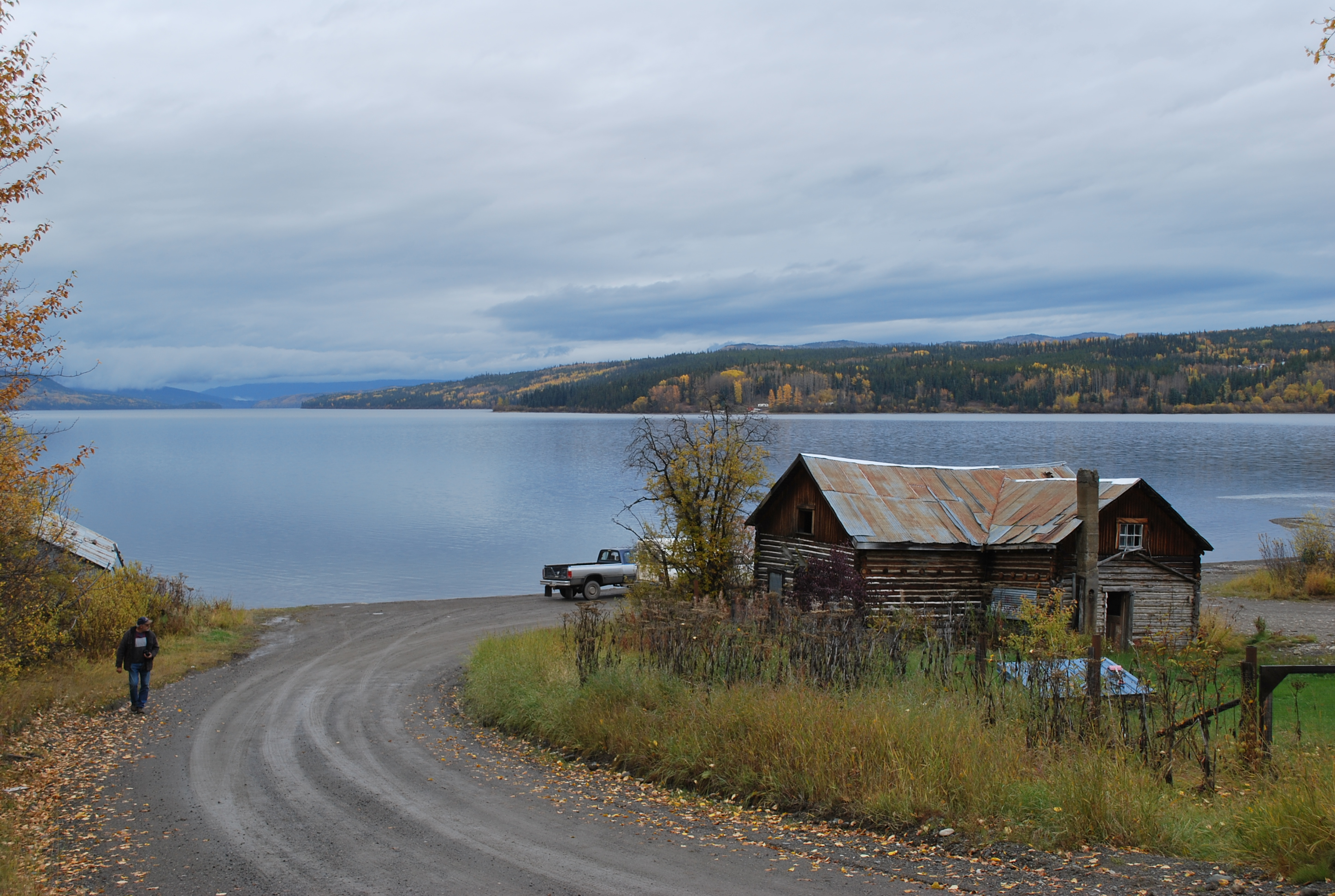

- Location within British Columbia
- Location: British Columbia
- Coordinates: 58°38′00″N 130°04′00″W
- Primary outflows: Dease River
- Basin countries: Canada

Dease Lake is a lake in the Stikine Plateau of the Northern Interior of British Columbia, Canada, located at the head of the Dease River, which flows north then northeast from the lake to join the Liard River.

The namesake community of Dease Lake, formerly Dease Lake Post, is located at the south end of the lake, straddling a low pass which leads into the basin from the Tanzilla River, a tributary of the Stikine.

The area around the lake was the focus of the Cassiar Gold Rush and numerous ghost towns and former settlement sites are scattered around its shores, including Laketon, Porter Landing, and Centre City.

Dease Lake is the burial site of and has a monument to English travelogue writer Warburton Pike.

== Name origin ==
The lake was named in 1834 by John McLeod, a Chief Trader for the Hudson's Bay Company at the former Dease Lake Post, for Peter Warren Dease, superintendent of the New Caledonia Fur District from 1830 to 1834, who had served with the Franklin Expedition of 1825–1827 and later was senior officer of the Dease & Simpson Arctic Expedition in 1837–1839.

== History ==
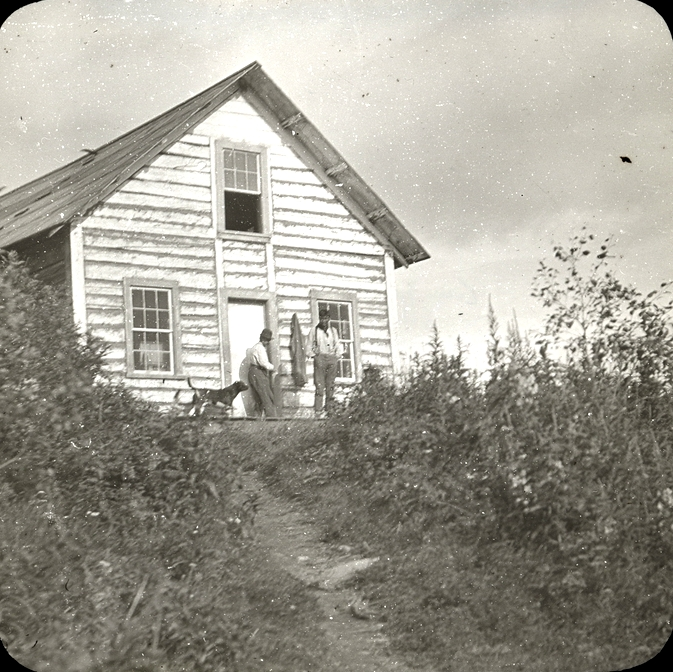
Trading post, Dease Lake, circa 1911

During the 19th and first half of the 20th century, the Hudson's Bay Company (HBC) had several trading around Dease Lake. The first one was established by Robert Campbell in 1837 on the north east shore. It only operated for 2 years before it was abandoned due to conflict with the local indigenous population.

In the 1870s, the HBC came back to Dease Lake, but it was not until 1898 that another permanent trading post was established at Laketon. The post moved to Porter Landing on the north end of the lake in 1906.

Circa 1928, the post, variously known as Laketon, Dease Lake, Dease's House, and Porter's Landing, was relocated to the south end of the lake near the community of Dease Lake. It was closed in August 1945.

== See also ==
- List of lakes of British Columbia
