= Warburton Pike =

English explorer (1861–1915)

Warburton Mayer Pike (1861–1915) was an English explorer of British Columbia and the Canadian Arctic.

== Biography ==
Pike was born in Wareham, Dorset. He was named after his grandmother's and mother's maiden names. His father (John William Pike) a ball clay merchant died in 1869, making Warburton and his siblings orphans. His mother was Mary Mayer (1827–1866), daughter of Thomas Mayer of Longport Pottery. His Grandmother was the daughter of Jacob Warbuton of New Hall Pottery. Warburton attended Rugby School and then Brasenose College Oxford University, where he became a close friend of Douglas Haig, the future Field Marshal and First Earl Haig. Pike inherited a fortune as a young man. He was often not the first European to visit an area but was often the first to write about the areas that he traveled. Pike's prose travelogues of the places he visited were widely read.

Pike committed suicide in the sea at Bournemouth in 1915, after being refused entry into the army due to ill health. There is a mountain named for him on Saturna Island near Vancouver Island. There is a memorial to him at Dease Lake near Cassiar on the British Columbian mainland. His grave is under a plain little stone cross in a Bournemouth (UK) public cemetery. There is also an historically important portage between Great Slave Lake and Artillery Lake in Northwest Territories, Pike's Portage, named after him.
