= Porter Landing =

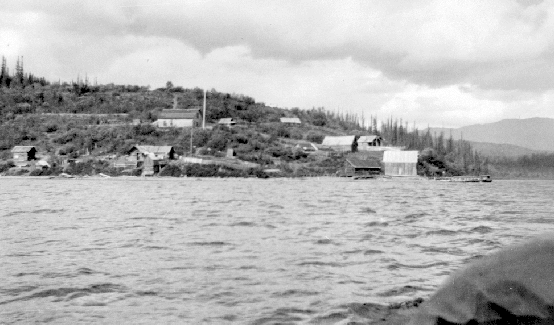
- Porter Landing (1926)

- Location of Porter Landing in British Columbia
- Coordinates: 58°48′00″N 130°06′00″W
- Country: Canada
- Province: British Columbia
- Area codes: 250, 778

Porter Landing is a locality and former boom town at the foot of Dease Lake, British Columbia, Canada, in that province's far Northern Interior. It grew during the 1870s Cassiar Country gold rush.
