= Game Cock (clipper) =

1850 clipper ship

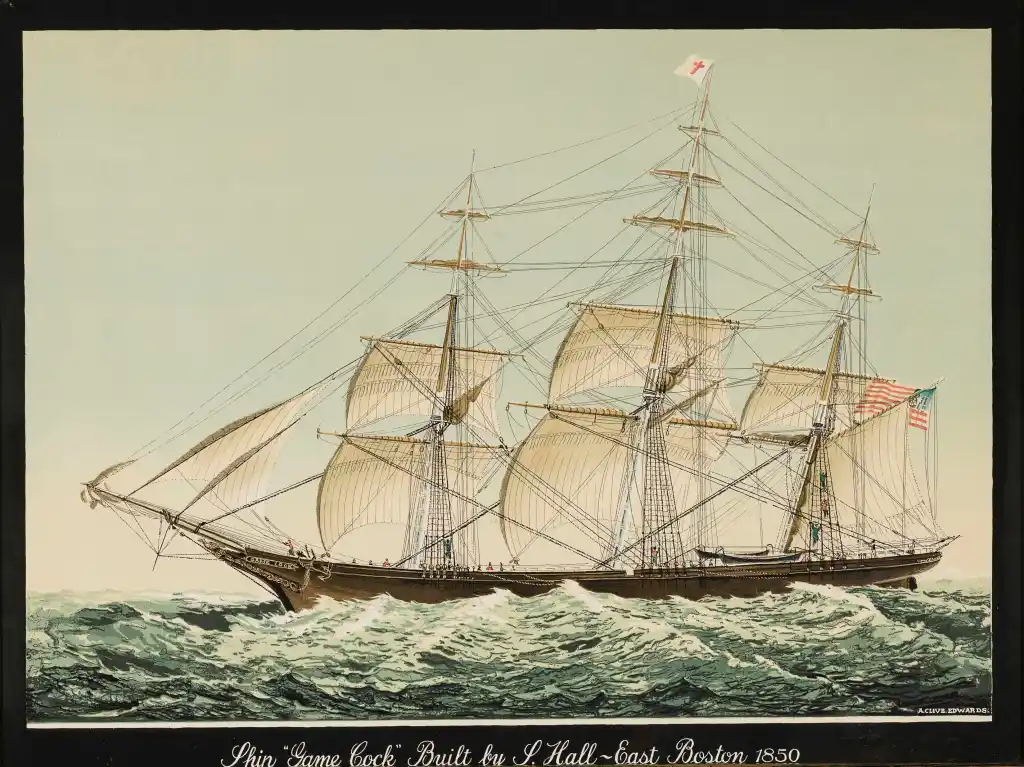
- 1924 heliogravure print, after a painting by A. Clive Edwards

History

United States
- Name: Game Cock
- Owner: Daniel C. Bacon, Boston, MA
- Builder: Samuel Hall, East Boston, MA
- Launched: Dec. 21, 1850
- Out of service: Feb. 1880
- Fate: Condemned Feb. 1880 at the Cape of Good Hope
- Notes: “Designed by Samuel H. Pook or Samuel Hall (disputed)”

General characteristics
- Tons burthen: 1391 tons
- Length: 200 ft (61 m) LOA
- Beam: 40 ft (12 m)
- Draft: 22 ft (6.7 m)
- Notes: 2 decks

The Game Cock was a clipper ship known for its long sailing life of 29 years and 2 months. Its principal route was the New York to San Francisco run.

== Construction ==
A game cock with neck extended served as the ship's figurehead. Game Cock was considered either a medium or extreme clipper, Its materials were similar to the Surprise.

It was built by S. Hall of East Boston, after being commissioned by Captain Daniel C. Bacon, a retired sailor and successful merchant.

== Voyages ==
Game Cock sailed between New York City and San Francisco. The ship put in for repairs in Rio de Janeiro in 1851, and made voyages to Bombay in 1851, and Batavia in 1859.

In the mid-1860s the ship was bought by Robert L. Taylor and others of New York.

The ship was condemned in 1880, at the Cape of Good Hope.
