= SS Messenger =

List of ships with the same or similar names

SS Messenger may refer to:

- SS Messenger (1866) wooden steam barge originally launched as a propeller-driven steamer in 1866
- SS Messenger (1942) (MC hull number 290), built by Moore Dry Dock in Oakland, California; later became USS Sheridan (AP-96/APA-51); scrapped in 1969 after explosion
- SS Messenger (1946) (MC hull number 2817), built by Consolidated Steel in Wilmington, California; scrapped in 1969
