= Sea Serpent (clipper) =

Extreme clipper launched in 1850

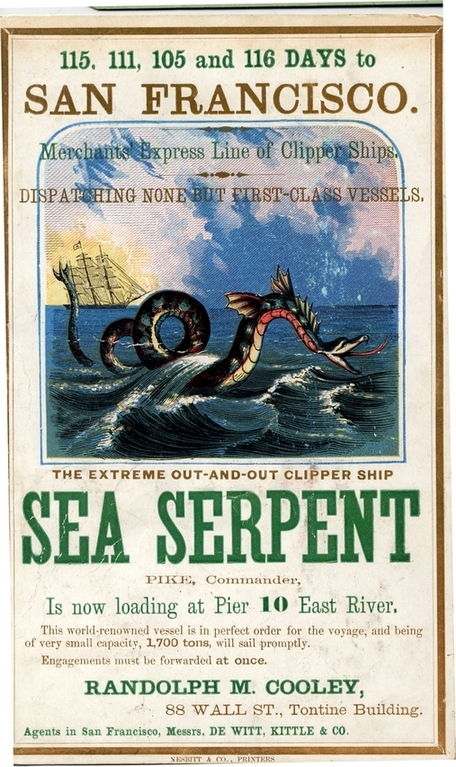
- Thumb

History

United States
- Name: Sea Serpent
- Owner: Grinnell, Minturn & Co., New York City
- Builder: George Raynes, Portsmouth, NH
- Launched: 1850
- Fate: Sold to Norway, 1874

Norway
- Acquired: 1874
- Renamed: Progress
- Fate: Abandoned at sea, 12 June 1891

General characteristics
- Class & type: Extreme clipper
- Length: 212 ft (65 m) OA
- Beam: 39 ft 3 in (11.96 m)
- Draft: 21 ft (6.4 m)
- Sail plan: 3 masts, ship rig
- Notes: 2 decks.

Sea Serpent was an 1850 extreme clipper that sailed in the San Francisco trade, the China trade, and the transatlantic lumber trade. She was one of the longest lived clippers, with a service life of 36 years and 5 months.

== Race to San Francisco, 1851 ==
Sea Serpent raced Stag Hound and John Bertram from New York City to San Francisco in 1851. Stag Hound arrived in 107 days. Sea Serpent made a 125-day passage, having had to put into Valparaiso eight days for repairs.

== Tea Race with Crest of the Wave ==
Sea Serpent sailed from Shanghai for London in company with the British clipper Crest of the Wave. A premium of thirty shillings a ton, over and above the amount of the freight, had been offered to the vessel first in, and this was quite sufficient inducement for both skippers to crack on. The two ships were fairly near together all the way home, and they actually hove to for pilots, off the Isle of Wight, within an hour of each other. The American captain determined that he would not be outdone by the Britisher, so leaving his ship in the hands of the mate, he came ashore in the boat that brought out his pilot, took the steamer from Cowes to Southampton, and the train up to Waterloo. From thence he took a cab to the Custom-house, and reported the Sea Serpent as "arrived," while each ship was carrying on all she knew in order to get into the Thames before the other.

== Fast passage between Whampoa and Anjer ==
In 1853, Sea Serpent "sailed from Whampoa Reach to New York in 101 days. The 29 days passage from Whampoa to Anjer was the fastest made that season."

== Description of Sea Serpent and tea clippers at Whampoa ==
About 1850-51, the upper anchorage at Whampoa Reach, below Canton, was a sight to be remembered by those who loved to look at beautiful ships, and the 'tea-fleet' was gathered waiting for 'the new crop.' There, moored in line, were the Sam Russell, the Sea-Serpent, the Challenge, the Flying Cloud, the Sea Witch, and half a dozen others, bright with paint and varnish and gilding, and their bottoms well cleaned of barnacles by the swift muddy current of fresh water ... They scrubbed copper, holystoned decks, squared the yards by the lifts and braces, and hoisted and lowered colors in unison with the American man-of-war which happened to be stationed there ...

"But one day, in the 'cool weather,' there would come a sudden change. Our clipper friends had men aloft, bending sails ... and all readiness was made for sea. About noon the great covered chop-boats came down the stream, with immense chattering of men and all sorts of fuss ... Stages were rigged, and the chests and half-chests came on board and were stowed away like magic, for the ship's capacity had been exactly measured beforehand, and each chest or half-chest fitted into place like a piece in a Chinese puzzle. These large ships were thus loaded in a few hours. Each chest had two slips of bamboo ... As they came over the gangways one slip was seized by an officer of the vessel, the other by a Chinese comprador, and thus 'tally' was kept. The crew of the vessel had no need to go into the hold, the Chinese stevedores made all snug; and then the hatches were put on and the hatch-covers well battened down, while, without delay, sail was made, the anchor weighed, and the Chinese pilot took charge to get her ... to sea as soon as possible; for in no business was time more synonymous with money than in the race with the 'new crop.'

"It was a sight to see the handling of those ships as they "backed and filled" and tided down the Reaches, sometimes almost grazing the quarter of a vessel at anchor; and, again, just escaping the tail of a mud-bank, while the grizzled old pig-tailed pilot took his bearings, squinted aloft, and in his own pidgeon-English said, 'Haul down jib! ... Shiver the mizzen-topsail! Throw her flat aback!'

== Loss of the ship ==
On June 12, 1891, on a voyage from Dublin to Quebec with a cargo of timber, she was abandoned at sea at 46° N, 40°W. The crew of 17 left the ship in boats, and was picked up by the bark Gulnare. On October 18, 1891, the barque Ardgowan sighted Sea Serpent at 45°N, 24°W. She drifted 1,120 miles (1,800 km) in 93 days, and was sighted 19 times before disappearing.
