= Cassiar Country =

Laketon Cassiar Country
- Location of Laketon in the Cassiar Country in British Columbia
- Coordinates: 58°42′00″N 130°06′00″W
- Country: Canada
- Province: British Columbia
- Area codes: 250, 778

The Cassiar Country, also referred to simply as the Cassiar, is a historical geographic region of the Canadian province of British Columbia. The Cassiar is located in the northwest portion of British Columbia, just to the northeast of the Stikine Country, while to the south is the Omineca Country. The area is noted for the Cassiar gold rush of the 1870s, when Laketon became its unofficial capital. The ghost town of Cassiar is also located in the Cassiar region.

== Collins Telegraph Line ==
In the early 1860s, Perry Collins obtained financing from Western Union Telegraph to build a telegraph line from San Francisco through British Columbia and Alaska and across the Bering Strait to Russia and ultimately Europe.

The line was begun in 1865 at New Westminster, and continued as far as the Skeena River in 1866, but then the project was abandoned as the transatlantic line was built first, making the Collins line redundant. Despite the fact that the Collins line would not be completed, surveyors had created a primitive route from Quesnel to the newly established settlement of Telegraph Creek, thus opening up the northern districts of British Columbia for determined and hardy travelers.

== Cassiar Gold Rush ==
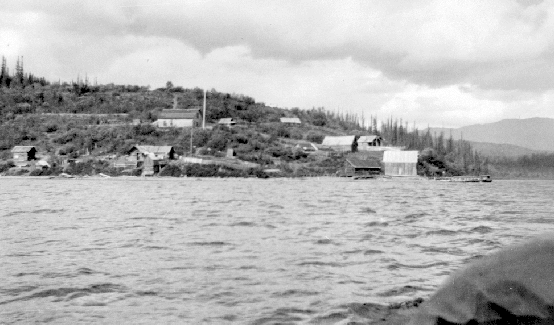
Porter Landing, Cassiar (1926)

In the 1870s a gold rush occurred in the region, based at McDame Creek and at Thibert Creek, a tributary of Dease Creek. In 1874, more than a million dollars' worth of gold was taken from the region and in 1877, one prospector found the largest gold nugget ever recorded in British Columbia: a 72-ounce gold nugget, mined from McDame Creek.

Much as the Stikine Country had been affected by the rush on the Stikine River, the Cassiar Gold Rush caused the government to show an interest in the area and John R. Adams was appointed as government agent for the Cassiar region in 1873, and was followed by Judge J. H. Sullivan who became the region's gold commissioner. Laketon, also known as Dease Town, became the unofficial capital of the Cassiar and at the height of the rush it had five stores, four hotels, two cafes and its own newspaper. Other gold rush towns were Porter Landing and Defot. However, by the 1880s most of the gold had been recovered and nearly all of the miners left the area, while only few merchants and Chinese miners remained behind. The region was also affected by the Klondike Gold Rush when in 1897–1898, 5000 miners went to the Yukon via the all Canadian route, up the Stikine River to Telegraph Creek and overland to the Teslin River.

== Later years ==
After the excitement of the gold rushes, the Cassiar was nearly forgotten until the early 1940s when the American military built the Alaska Highway from Dawson Creek, British Columbia to Fairbanks, Alaska, thus further opening up the area and providing ease of transportation. Small companies began gold mining with heavy equipment. Then, most notably, the early 1950s brought the Cassiar Asbestos Mine, which operated from 1953 until 1992 and produced the company town of Cassiar.

== See also ==
- Cassiar Mountains
- Stewart-Cassiar Highway
- Cassiar (electoral district)
- Nellie Cashman "Angel of the Cassiar"
