= Saturna Island =

Island of the Gulf Islands in British Columbia, Canada

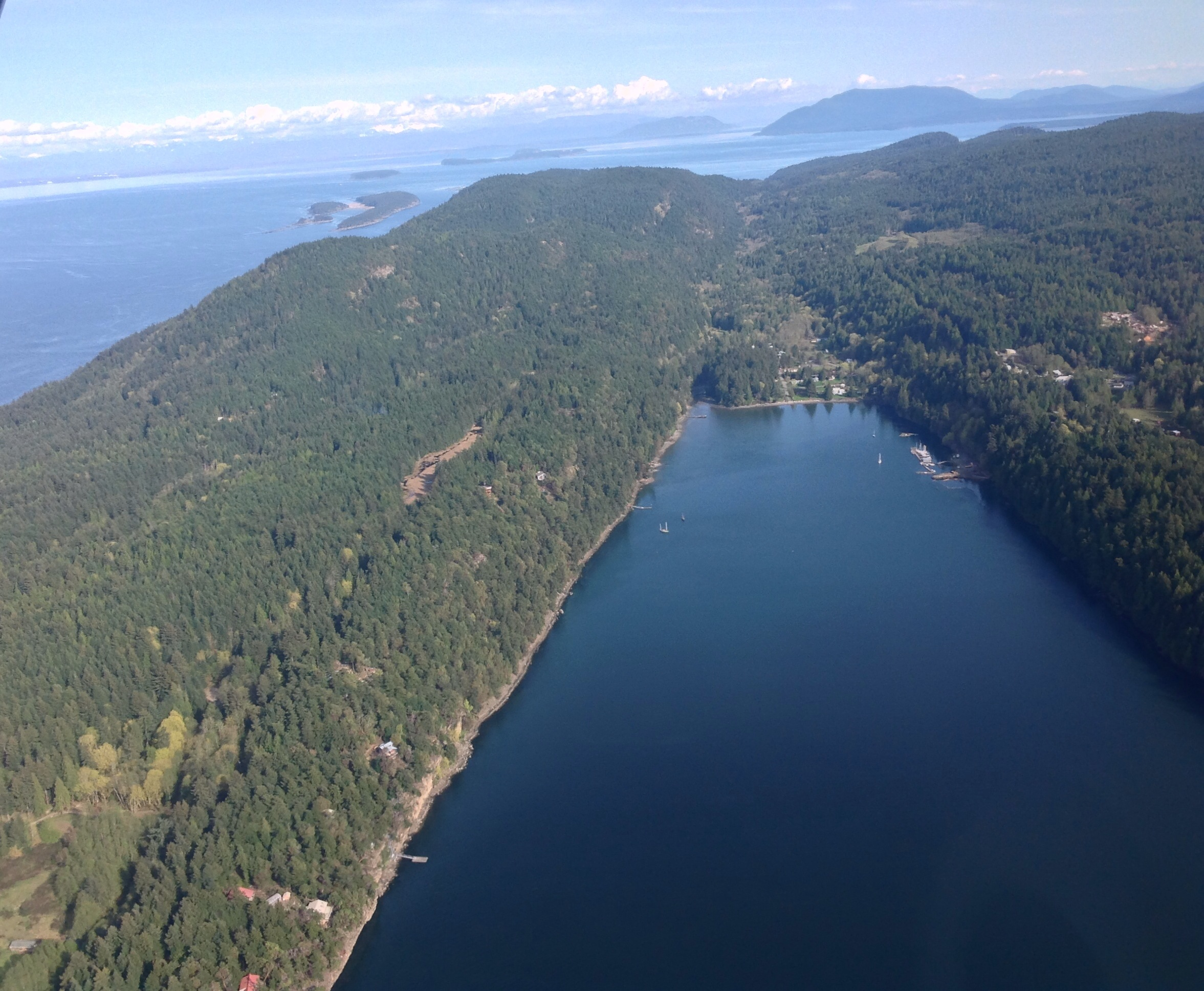
- South-facing aerial view of Saturna Island

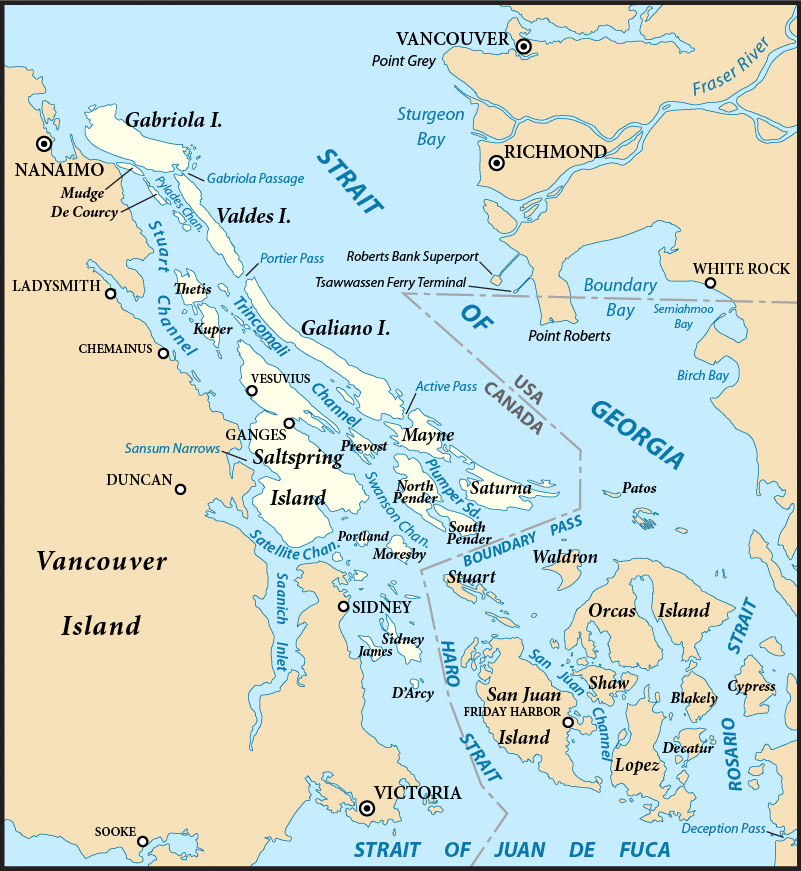
- The Southern Gulf Islands, including Saturna

Geography
- Coordinates: 48°47′00″N 123°08′32″W
- Archipelago: Gulf Islands
- Adjacent to: Strait of Georgia, Boundary Pass
- Area: 31 km^{2} (12 sq mi)
- Highest elevation: 397 m (1302 ft)

Administration
- Canada
- Province: British Columbia
- Regional District: Capital Regional District

Demographics
- Population: 350

Saturna Island is a mountainous island, about 31 square kilometres (12 sq mi) in size, in the Southern Gulf Islands chain of British Columbia, Canada. It is situated approximately midway between the Lower Mainland of B.C. and Vancouver Island, and is the most easternly of the Gulf Islands. It is surrounded on three sides by the Canada–United States border. To the north is Point Roberts, Washington, and to the east and south are the San Juan Islands. There is a First Nations reserve on the island for the Tsayout and Tseycum Nations. The island has a permanent population of around 350; however, this number increases during the summer season.

Approximately half of the island is in the Gulf Islands National Park Reserve (GINPR) that was formed in 2003 from a gift of ecologically sensitive land by Ulla Ressner and John Fry, existing provincial parks, an Ecological Reserve, and other Crown land.

== History ==
The island was first used by indigenous people who called the island "Long Nose," due to the island's long north-eastern tapering shoreline that ends at East Point. The name Saturna comes from the Spanish naval schooner Santa Saturnina ("St. Saturnina") captained by pilot (piloto) José María Narváez, which along with a longboat of the Spanish naval packet ship San Carlos, explored the island's coast in an excursion under the overall command of Pilot Juan Pantoja y Arriaga in 1791. The name was initially applied only to East Point. The contraction to "Saturna" applied to the whole island was first made by Dionisio Alcalá Galiano in 1792. The first European settlers came in the 1800s, but the island was slower to develop than the neighbouring Southern Gulf Islands due to its relative isolation and mountainous topography.

== Attractions ==
East Point is a place famous for onshore whale watching. It is also the site where Moby Doll, the second orca to be held in captivity, was harpooned in 1964. The Saturna Island Heritage Committee runs a tiny museum in the former fog alarm building at East Point where visitors can learn about the story of Moby Doll and some of Saturna's history.

The southern resident J, K and L orca pods pass by in the summer months, with Bigg's also known as transient orca visiting year round. Saturna has many species of terrestrial, aerial and aquatic animals. Saturna is a popular destination for geocachers, with approximately 60 caches available on the island. Caches are built and maintained by Parks Canada and the Saturna Ecological Education Centre.

Every year on Canada day (July 1) since 1950, there has been the Saturna Island Lamb Barbeque with a portion of the proceeds going to the Saturna Community Club.

== Parks and beaches ==
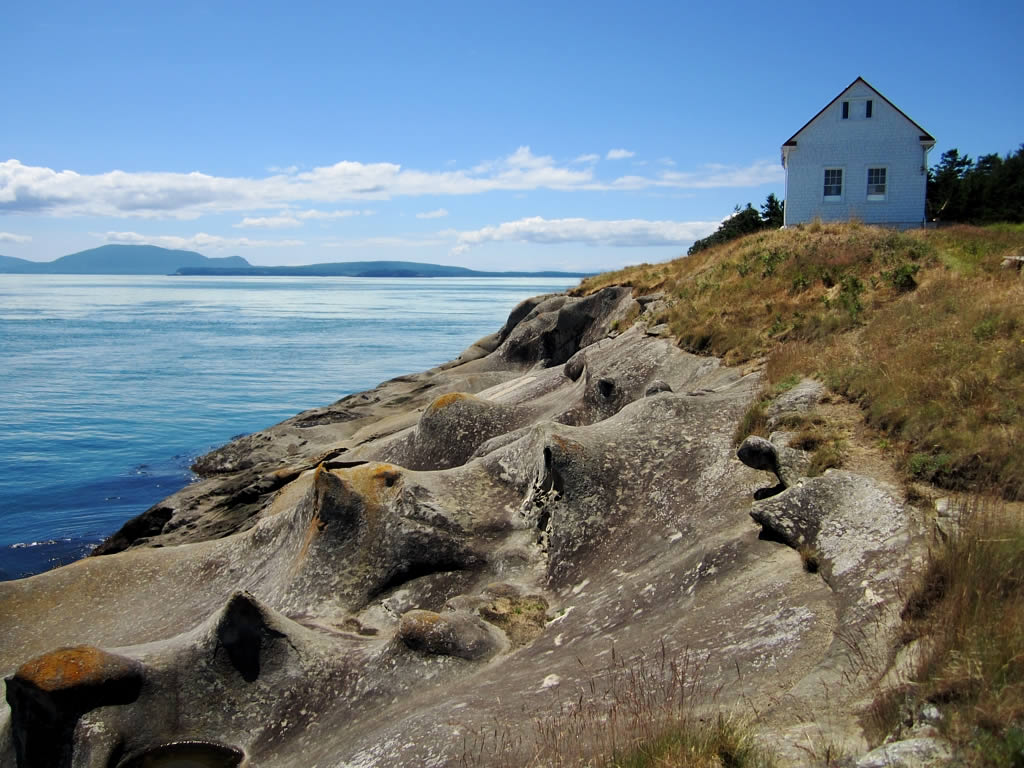
East Point Fog Alarm Building and Sandstone formations.

East Point Day Use Area, with a museum inside the old Fog Alarm Building, an Environment Canada monitoring station, and sandstone shoreline.

Lyall Creek trail runs through a second generation forest for approximately 1 km (0.6 mi) following the seasonal and one of few salmon bearing creeks on the Southern Gulf Islands leading hikers to Narvaez Bay Road.

Mount Warburton Pike viewpoint, which is the tallest mountain in the Outer Gulf Islands. On its peak, there is a communication tower used by a variety of radio and television services.

At the most westerly point of Winter Cove Day Use Area which has a variety of ecosystems including wetlands and marshes, strong tidal currents rush through Boat Pass, providing a shortcut for small boat operators.

Apart the lands of the Gulf Islands National Park Reserve, the local Saturna Island Parks & Recreation Commission mark over a dozen prescribed beach access points from public thoroughfares around the island and oversee the Thomson Community Park with its pebble beach, picnic shelter, and nine hole disc golf course.

== Camping ==
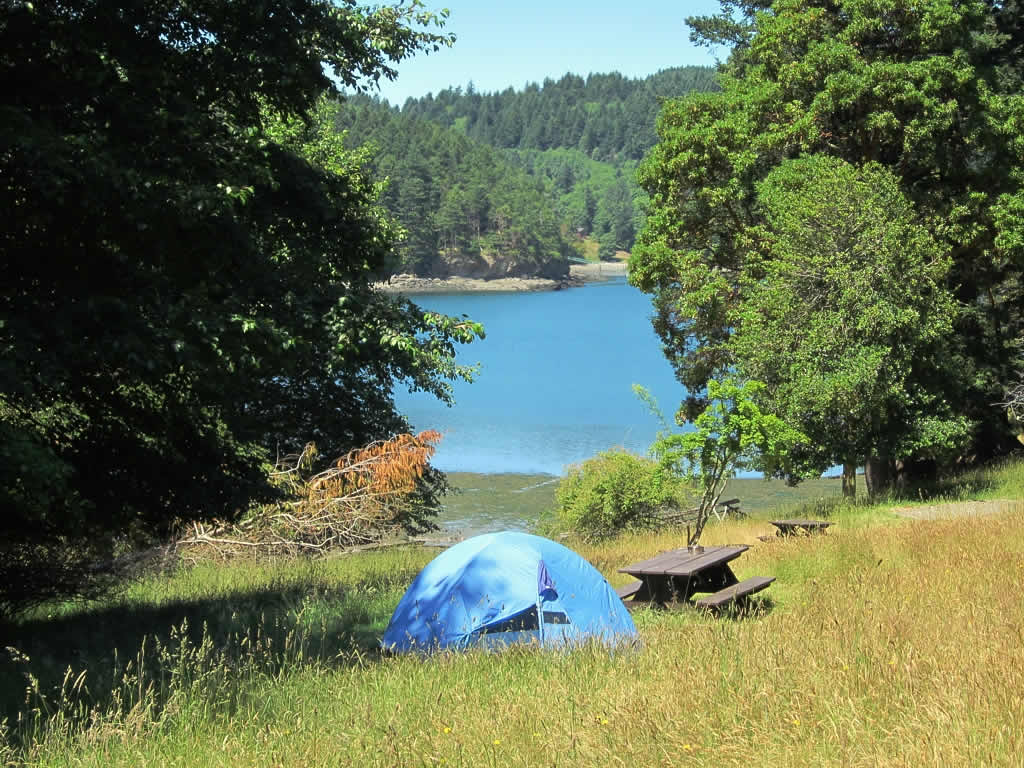
Camping at Narvaez Bay.

Gulf Islands National Park Reserve offers 7 walk-in (or kayak-in) backcountry campsites at Narvaez Bay. The trailhead to Narvaez Bay is located at the parking lot at the end of Narvaez Bay Road. There is also a bike rack available for cyclists to lock up their bikes. From the parking lot, there is a 1 km (0.6 mi) trail down to two beaches, Narvaez Bay and Echo Bay, and a side trail off to Monarch Head, which looks out to Boundary Pass and the San Juan Islands. There is no potable water at Narvaez Bay, and no campfires are permitted, regardless of season. Two private campgrounds offer year-round camping: Neither permits fires, however both offer access to potable water.

== Climate ==
Climate data for Saturna Island
Month	Jan	Feb	Mar	Apr	May	Jun	Jul	Aug	Sep	Oct	Nov	Dec	Year
Record high °C (°F)	13.0 (55.4)	15.0 (59.0)	21.0 (69.8)	23.0 (73.4)	28.0 (82.4)	30.5 (86.9)	33.0 (91.4)	31.5 (88.7)	28.5 (83.3)	23.0 (73.4)	15.0 (59.0)	13.5 (56.3)	33.0 (91.4)
Mean daily maximum °C (°F)	6.3 (43.3)	7.4 (45.3)	9.5 (49.1)	12.4 (54.3)	15.7 (60.3)	18.4 (65.1)	21.3 (70.3)	21.4 (70.5)	18.7 (65.7)	12.8 (55.0)	8.4 (47.1)	6.2 (43.2)	13.2 (55.8)
Daily mean °C (°F)	4.3 (39.7)	5.0 (41.0)	6.6 (43.9)	9.1 (48.4)	12.0 (53.6)	14.5 (58.1)	17.1 (62.8)	17.3 (63.1)	15.1 (59.2)	10.2 (50.4)	6.4 (43.5)	4.3 (39.7)	10.2 (50.4)
Mean daily minimum °C (°F)	2.3 (36.1)	2.5 (36.5)	3.7 (38.7)	5.7 (42.3)	8.3 (46.9)	10.6 (51.1)	12.8 (55.0)	13.2 (55.8)	11.4 (52.5)	7.6 (45.7)	4.2 (39.6)	2.4 (36.3)	7.1 (44.7)
Record low °C (°F)	−10.0 (14.0)	−8.0 (17.6)	−6.0 (21.2)	0.0 (32.0)	1.0 (33.8)	5.0 (41.0)	8.0 (46.4)	9.0 (48.2)	5.0 (41.0)	−1.5 (29.3)	−9.0 (15.8)	−12.5 (9.5)	−12.5 (9.5)
Average precipitation mm (inches)	129.0 (5.08)	64.6 (2.54)	65.0 (2.56)	52.7 (2.07)	43.4 (1.71)	37.3 (1.47)	21.3 (0.84)	32.9 (1.30)	29.6 (1.17)	90.2 (3.55)	140.1 (5.52)	106.2 (4.18)	812.3 (31.99)
Average rainfall mm (inches)	115.4 (4.54)	59.6 (2.35)	57.7 (2.27)	52.7 (2.07)	43.4 (1.71)	37.3 (1.47)	21.3 (0.84)	32.9 (1.30)	29.6 (1.17)	89.7 (3.53)	134.4 (5.29)	98.2 (3.87)	772.2 (30.41)
Average snowfall cm (inches)	13.9 (5.5)	5.0 (2.0)	6.7 (2.6)	0 (0)	0 (0)	0 (0)	0 (0)	0 (0)	0 (0)	0.5 (0.2)	5.7 (2.2)	7.9 (3.1)	39.7 (15.6)
Average precipitation days (≥ 0.2 mm)	20.3	14.8	17.1	15.2	12.4	10.5	5.9	6.8	7.4	16.3	20.9	19.8	167.4
Average rainy days	18.6	13.9	16.7	15.2	12.4	10.5	5.9	6.8	7.4	16.2	20.5	18.5	162.6
Average snowy days (≥ 0.2 cm)	2.6	1.4	1.1	0	0	0	0	0	0	0.1	0.7	1.9	7.8
Source: Environment Canada

== Transportation ==
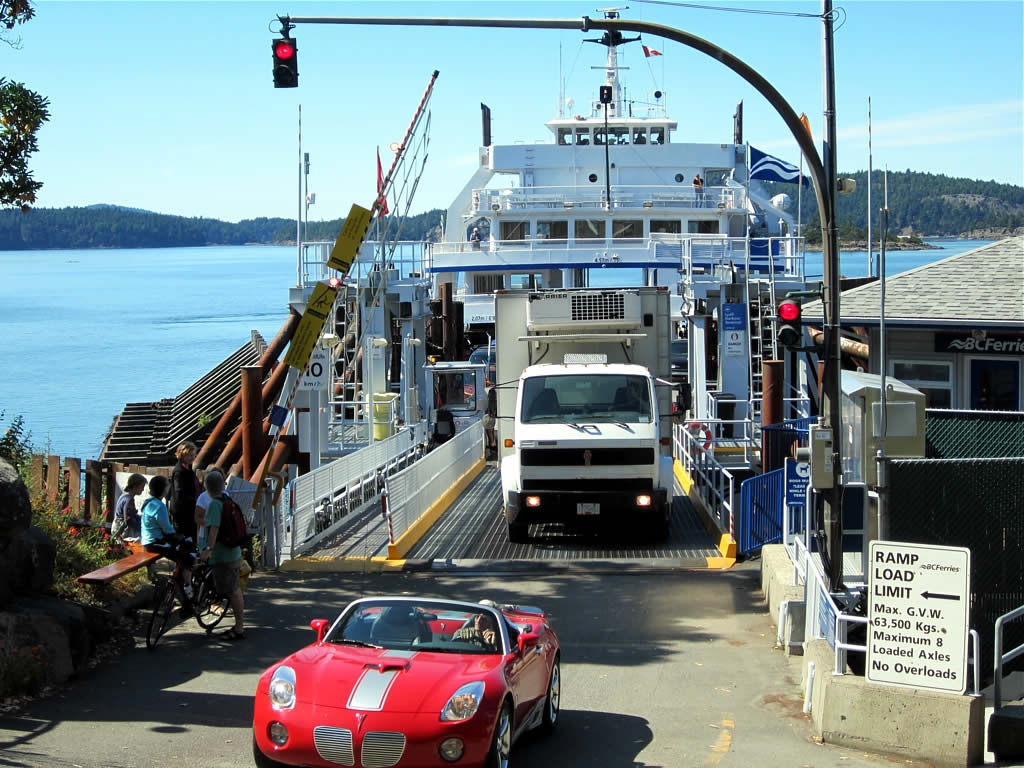
Image of Lyall Harbour in 2012

Saturna is accessible via BC Ferries, which offers daily sailings to Lyall Harbour on Saturna from Swartz Bay on Vancouver Island or Tsawwassen on the Mainland. Daily floatplane service from Vancouver International Airport and downtown Victoria to Lyall Harbour is available. There are a number of excellent anchorages and moorages for private vessels, including Lyall Harbour Government Wharf which is operated by the Capital Regional District's Harbour Commission.
