= Ammons =

Ammons is a surname. Notable people with the surname include:

- Albert Ammons (1907–1949), American jazz pianist
- A.R. Ammons (1926–2001), American author and poet
- Cliff Ammons (1918–1981), Louisiana state representative
- Donalda Ammons (born 1953), American educator and writer
- Doug Ammons (born 1957), American adventurer, kayaker, psychologist, and author
- Elizabeth Ammons, American literary scholar
- Gene Ammons (1925–1974), American jazz saxophonist
- Elias M. Ammons (1860–1925), Governor of Colorado
- Jane Ammons (born 1953), American industrial engineer
- Robert B. Ammons (1920–1999), American psychologist
