= Tanzilla River =

Tributary river in the country of Canada

- Mouth of the Tanzilla River

Location
- Country: Canada
- Province: British Columbia
- District: Cassiar Land District

Physical characteristics
- Source: Three Sisters Range
  - location: Stikine Ranges
  - coordinates: 58°10′26″N 129°29′51″W
  - elevation: 2,040 m (6,690 ft)
- Mouth: Stikine River
  - location: Grand Canyon of the Stikine
  - coordinates: 58°7′37″N 130°40′11″W
  - elevation: 295 m (968 ft)
- Length: 140 km (87 mi)
- Basin size: 1,833 km^{2} (708 sq mi)
- Discharge
  - average: 16.0 m^{3}/s (570 cu ft/s)

Basin features
- Tributaries
  - left: Itsillitu Creek, Tsenaglode Creek, Gnat Creek
  - right: Auguschidle Creek, Sixteen Mile Creek, Tatsho Creek, Zuback Creek
- Topo map: NTS 104J2 Classy Creek; NTS 104J5 Ketchum Lake; NTS 104J7 Little Tuya River; NTS 104J8 Dease Lake

The Tanzilla River is a tributary of the Stikine River in northwest part of the province of British Columbia, Canada.

From its source in the Three Sisters Range the Tanzilla River flows roughly north and northwest to the vicinity of the community of Dease Lake, then turns west and southwest, flowing to the Stikine River in the Grand Canyon of the Stikine. The river's total length is roughly 140 km (87 mi). The Tanzilla River's mean annual discharge is estimated at 16.0 m^{3}/s (570 cu ft/s). Its watershed covers 1,833 km^{2} (708 sq mi). The watershed's land cover is classified as 28.8% conifer forest, 27.3% shrubland, 24.4% mixed forest, 11.7% barren, 5.2% herbaceous, and small amounts of other cover.

The mouth of the Tanzilla River is located about 40 km (25 mi) northeast of the community of Telegraph Creek, British Columbia, about 53 km (33 mi) southwest of Dease Lake, British Columbia, and about 220 km (140 mi) east of Juneau, Alaska.

The Tanzilla River's watershed is within the traditional territory of the Tahltan First Nation, of the Tahltan people.

== Geography ==
The Tanzilla River originates in the Three Sisters Range, whence it flows northwest toward the community of Dease Lake. It receives the waters of numerous unnamed tributaries and a few named ones. Gnat Creek joins from the south, then Zuback Creek from the east, Tsenaglode Creek from the southwest, and Dalby Creek from the east, before the Tanzilla River nears Dease Lake and turns to the southwest.

As the Tanzilla River nears Dease Lake its course is followed by the Stewart–Cassiar Highway, which goes to Dease Lake and beyond to the Yukon. Near Dease Lake the river flows by Tanzilla Butte and Tatsho Mountain. After Dease Lake the Tanzilla River flows through wetlands in a meandering path, north of the Hotailuh Range. Telegraph Creek Road, which connects the community of Telegraph Creek to the Stewart-Cassiar Highway, follows the Tanzilla River from Dease Lake to the Stikine River. As the Tanzilla flows west and southwest toward the Stikine and through the Tanzilla Plateau, it receives many tributaries including Tatsho Creek, Sixteen Mile Creek, Auguschidle Creek, and Itsillitu Creek.

The lower Tanzilla River also flows by the Tahltan Indian reserve "Tatcho Creek 11", near the mouth of Tatsho Creek. Near its mouth on the Stikine, the Tanzilla River passes by the locality of Cariboo Meadows, then enters Stikine River Provincial Park before emptying into the Stikine River in the Grand Canyon of the Stikine, just east of the mouth of the Tuya River.

== See also ==
- List of rivers of British Columbia
