= Stikine Country =

Geographic region of British Columbia, Canada

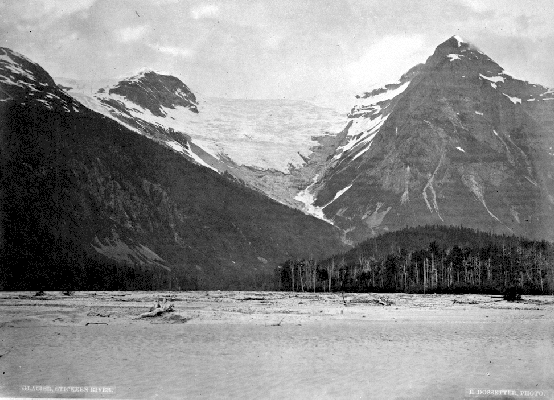
Stikine River

The Stikine Country /stɪˈkiːn/, also referred to as the Stikine District or simply "the Stikine", is one of the historical geographic regions of the Canadian province of British Columbia, located inland from the central Alaska Panhandle and comprising the basin of the Stikine River and its tributaries. The term Stikine–Iskut (alone or in various combination forms "District", "Country", "Region") is also fairly common to describe the area, and references the Iskut River, the Stikine's largest tributary and describable as its south fork.

== Geography ==
The basin of the Stikine is sparsely populated, mostly by members of the Tahltan people, though the lower reaches are the territory of group of the Tlingit people centred on Wrangell, Alaska, which is on Etolin Island just outside the mouth of the Stikine. The region is noted for its rugged and unusual mix of glaciated ranges, semi-arid subarctic volcanic plateaux and cones, and deep river canyons, most of all the Grand Canyon of the Stikine, which was described by naturalist John Muir as "the northern Yosemite". Also notable and rather famous on the river's course is the Great Glacier, which fronts along the river's right (west) bank a few miles north of the Alaska frontier.

Mount Edziza Provincial Park, Spatsizi Plateau Wilderness Provincial Park and Stikine River Provincial Park are the largest provincial parks in the region, which continues to be heavily explored for mineral potentials since first opened up by the Stikine Gold Rush of the 1860s, which forced the creation of the Stikine Territory, soon afterwards absorbed into the Colony of British Columbia. The term "Stikine District" was also used in reference to the Stikine Mining District, an administrative jurisdiction. Today the term Stikine Region is a British Columbia administrative district, similar to a Regional District but not fully qualified as one, but it does not include all of the Stikine Country and comprises mostly the Cassiar Country and Atlin District, which are to the north and northwest of the Stikine Country, respectively.

The largest town in the district is Telegraph Creek, which lies on a side-road to the west of the Stewart-Cassiar Highway, which traverses the region from north to south, connecting parts of British Columbia farther south with the Yukon Territory to the north. To the northeast of the Stikine Country is another region known as the Cassiar Country, and to its southeast is the Omineca Country (both of which had also at one time been "Mining Districts" resulting from their own gold rushes).

== History ==
The region was the traditional home of the Taku and Inland Tlingit people who by the 19th century settled around what was to become the gold rush town of Atlin. Other First Nations such as the Tahltan settled at Telegraph Creek and Dease Lake. The Sekani lived along the Finlay and Parsnip Rivers, while in the east the Kaska people occupied the Liard and Dease Rivers and eventually settled along McDame Creek. Non native exploration of the district did not occur until the 1770s with the arrival of Russian fur traders, who never traveled beyond the coastal areas, but relied on the Tlingits to provide the pelts from the inland animals. With the construction of a fort at Fort Wrangell, the Russian fur traders held a monopoly in the region until the 1830s when Fort Taku and Fort Stikine were both built on the Stikine River by the Hudson's Bay Company.

=== Stikine Gold Rush ===
On September 12, 1861, the Victoria newspaper, the British Colonist, reported a rumor that gold had been discovered on the Stikine River, and by the following spring, more than 200 miners struck out for the Cassiar. Sixty of them went on a sternwheeler, the Flying Dutchman, owned by Captain William Moore.

While the rush did not settle the area, as had the Fraser Canyon or the Cariboo Gold Rush in their respective regions, it did draw the attention of British Columbia’s Governor James Douglas, who petitioned the British government to create the Stikine Territory from the line of the Finlay and Skeena Rivers, which were the Colony of British Columbia's northern boundary, north to the 62nd parallel and east to the 125th meridian. The territory was established in 1862, and a year later it was merged into the Colony of British Columbia.

=== Collins Telegraph Line ===
In the early 1860s, Perry Collins, obtained financing from Western Union Telegraph to build a telegraph line from San Francisco through British Columbia and Alaska and across the Bering Strait to Russia and ultimately Europe. The line was begun in 1865 at New Westminster, and continued as far as the Skeena River in 1866, but then the project was abandoned because the transatlantic line was built first, making the Collins line redundant. Despite the fact that the line would not be completed, surveyors had created a primitive route from Quesnel to the newly established settlement of Telegraph Creek, thus opening up the district for travel.

The region was also affected by the Klondike Gold Rush when in 1897–1898, 5000 miners went to the Yukon via the all Canadian route, up the Stikine River to Telegraph Creek and overland to the Teslin River.

== See also ==
- Sacred Headwaters
- Stikine Territory
- Northern Cordilleran Volcanic Province
- Stikine Gold Rush
- Stikine River
- Stikine Ranges
- Cassiar Gold Rush
- Omineca Gold Rush
- Fort Stikine
