= Doug Ammons =

American kayaker and psychologist

Doug Ammons (born March 14, 1957) is an adventurer and is best known for his kayaking expeditions. He has degrees in mathematics, physics, and a masters and PhD in psychology from University of Montana. He is also a classical guitarist, black-belt martial artist, an author, philosopher and worked for many years as an editor for two academic journals of psychology Psychological Reports and Perceptual and Motor Skills.

== Early years ==
Doug Ammons was born in Missoula, Montana, to Robert B. Ammons and Carol H. Ammons. He grew up surrounded by family and knowledge. Both of his parents have degrees in psychology, his father being a professor at the University of Montana. When he was in his adolescent years, his father would put together science projects for Doug and his siblings to work on, it "taught them to have open and investigative minds". Their father's assigned projects led the Ammons kids' to several places, like the backcountry of Yellowstone National Park, Coppermine on the Arctic coast, the desert of Oregon, and the Columbia River Gorge. Doug Ammons and his siblings would also hike, backpack, swim and share their experiences together thru poetry.

From an early age, Ammons was comfortable in the water; he was paddling lakes and easy local rivers in folding kayaks. He learned to conquer both its currents and depths by becoming scuba certified at the age of 12. Ammons also was a competitive swimmer, making it to nationals several times in high school and then competing in college on the varsity Grizzly team.

== Kayaker ==
Doug Ammons was around 24 when he really started to pick up kayaking. However, he played classical guitar every chance he could before he got into kayaking. "I was looking for a different kind of music to play, and I found it in the current and flowing water," said Doug in an interview with Ben Friberg for Steep Creeks about why classical guitar playing led him to kayaking. Ammons was also very inspired by Rob Lesser paddling the Grand Canyon of the Stikine in 1981.

For over 25 years, Doug Ammons has been a world class kayaker. He has accomplished many first descents, from the western states of Montana, Wyoming, and Idaho. Ammons also has travelled to many different areas for paddling, like Mexico, the Himalayas, South America, and Canada. Doug Ammons enjoys soloing rivers. In answer to a question asked by Ben Friberg about soloing, Ammons responded saying, "The interesting thing is, I'm sure that nearly all serious paddlers solo at some point, mostly because it provides a truly rewarding sense of intimacy with a river". The rivers he solos do not consist of just class III; he solos class V, deep gorges where paddlers need to be on top of their game for a successful trip. One river in particular that Doug Ammons soloed was the Grand Canyon of the Stikine. He was part of the second descent in 1990 but then decided he would solo it two years later. Ammons comments later in an interview with the Missoulian, saying, "I tried to do the hardest thing I could conceive of, in the purest style possible". Doug's solo descent on the Stikine shows commitment and perseverance, the sports ultimate test.

Doug Ammons has turned away sponsorship offers from many kayaking companies and also declined the opportunity to have a show with ESPN on a race he founded, a big water race on the North Fork Payette River. Doug is a solid kayaker but is very humble at the same time. He believes kayaking will take paddlers to beautiful places, "but only in context." Doug Ammons states in an interview with Michael Moore from The Missoulian: "These sports like climbing and kayaking, they have this patina of greatness about them because, frankly, most people can't do them at the highest levels. But they are no greater than what others have done. They don't cure cancer. They don't feed hungry people. They don't provide clean water".

== Author ==
Doug Ammons is a recognized author of books, essays, and articles about kayaking, philosophy of adventures sports, and Montana history. He has written articles for Rapid Magazine, Kayak Session, Canoe & Kayak Magazine, Coast Mountain Culture, and Distinctly Montana. His books include The Laugh of the Water Nymph, Whitewater Philosophy, and, most recently, A Darkness Lit by Heroes. Ammons has given presentations about the topics featured in his books at speaking events throughout the USA and internationally in Europe.

== Psychologist ==
Doug Ammons followed his parents' footsteps by getting his PhD in psychology. He spent many years working as an editor for the academic journals Psychological Reports and Perceptual and Motor Skills and has contributed his own research within the realm of psychology. His parents started Ammons Scientific, an independent psychological publishing company in Missoula, Montana, in the 1940s.

== Recognition/Work ==
In Outside Magazine, Ammons was named number seven in the top ten adventurers of the 1900s. He was recognized for running the Stikine solo. Outside even compared him to Reinhold Messner: "What Reinhold Messner did for alpinism, Ammons did for paddling". With an interview with Kriti Niemeyer for Lively Times, Doug commented about not being a fan of lists, "but it is a huge honor to be compared to Reinhold Messner".

Doug Ammons also contributed to seven documentaries about beautiful rivers; he wrote scripts for four and paddled in all seven. The movies were done for ESPN, National Geographic Channel, and Outdoor Life Network. Out of the seven documentaries, four won Emmys. Also, Doug Ammons "won an Emmy award as a cinematographer for a film shot in Bolivia." Most recently he contributed as co-writer and co-producer to an eighth documentary, Anson Fogel's Wildwater.

Doug Ammons has written two books about his view and relationship with a sport he loves: The Laugh of the Water Nymph written in 2005, Whitewater Philosophy written in 2009. Ammons's forthcoming work The Stikine will capture the experience of his solo run on the Grand Canyon of the Stikine.

== Personal life ==
Ammons currently resides in Missoula, MT with his wife Robin Ammons and their children and grandchildren.
