= Buck Choquette =

Alexander "Buck" Choquette (c. August 17th 1830–June 1898) was a French-Canadian prospector and adventurer who was the discoverer in 1861 of the gold strike which led to the Stikine Gold Rush.

== Early life ==
He was born Taddée Choquette in St. Benoit de Mirabel (Deux-Montagnes) in a farming family. His parents were Julien Choquette and Magdeleine Rastoul. His father was a farmer and also a lieutenant in the loyal militia of St. Eustache who took part in the Battle of St. Eustache against the Patriotes (December 1837). His two cousins, Damien Masson and Luc-Hyacinthe Masson, were well known Patriotes. His uncle Basile Choquette was also a captain in the loyal militia of St. Eustache, directed by Maximilien Globensky.

Choquette left home on foot in 1849 at the age of 19 and set out first for work in Montreal, then traveled via Duluth, Minnesota, to Independence, Missouri, where he joined one of the many wagon trains bound for the California Gold Rush. Arriving too late to stake a claim, Choquette found work as a mucker or panner. He worked his way north through the Shasta diggings, and then the Trinity, Scott and Klamath Rivers, reaching the Oregon Territory and making it to the Fraser goldfields in 1858. Failing to find his own strike there, in 1859 and 1860, he prospected a while on the remote Nass River and other rivers north of that without much success.

== Gold discovery ==
Then, on a trip to Victoria, he encountered a group of Stikine First Nations, who were a subgroup of the Tlingit; suspecting the Stikine and rivers farther north were richer in gold the further one went north, he persuaded them to let him ride in their canoes to Fort Stikine (today's Wrangell, Alaska), in what was then still Russian America. No longer a Hudson's Bay Company post, the former fur post was under the control of the powerful Chief Shakes, and had become known as Shakesville. Shake's daughter Georgiana became Choquette's wife, a great honour in prestige-conscious Tlingit society. With his wife and ten men of the Stikine people, and the chief's blessing, Choquette traveled up the Stikine River, whose mouth is near Wrangell, and found gold at a location near Telegraph Creek, about 150 km (93 mi) up that river, at a place marked on the map today as Buck Bar. News of his strike reached Victoria and thousands of men traveled via the Stikine and overland via another route up the Skeena River, by what became Hazelton.

Choquette's own claim was not that profitable, but he opened a trading post near his claim, moving it from time to time over the years. His main post was farther down river, near the Great Glacier, at a location known as Choquette Bar today, near Choquette Hot Springs Provincial Park, and was also known as Ice Mountain, which was the name of one of the dominant peaks at that location. By 1867, Choquette and his wife were living in Shakesville, where he had operated a post for the Hudson's Bay Company, whose goods he also sold at his upriver stores. When the Alaska Purchase of that year saw control of the Alaska Panhandle transferred to the United States, Choquette chose to move upriver to his main store on the Stikine, which was at the confluence of the Stikine and Anuk Rivers. He had some disputes with the Hudson's Bay Company, and opened up his own store independent of their interests, but preferred to trade in British territory to avoid American taxes and having to buy American goods. Choquette spoke both Tlingit and the Chinook Jargon and was invaluable in intercommunal relations and commerce to all parties acquainted with him. As business on the river's diggings began to slow, Choquette opened a salmon saltery and in 1886 traveled via one of the first transcontinental Canadian Pacific Railway to testify at hearings in Ottawa concerning the location of the boundary between Alaska and British Columbia.

== Later years ==
After the passing of his wife, with whom he had had many children, at the age of 67 Choquette struck out again for newer goldfields still farther north, opening a store in the Klondike. He died in the hospital in Dawson City in June 1898. Among his last visitors was the novelist Jack London, who had asked to meet an authentic prospector.

== Legacy ==
In addition to the Choquette River, other places named after him are: its source the Choquette Glacier, and Choquette Hot Springs Provincial Park (the springs themselves are the Stikine Hot Springs), and Buck Bar and also Buck Riffle near Telegraph Creek, another bar on the lower Stikine, Choquette Bar, which also was known as Buck's Bar like its upstream counterpart (as were other locations where he had at times had his store). Mount Johnny, to the southeast of Choquette Bar, was named for his son, a trapper and miner on the Iskut River, who died in the 1930s. Many of Choquette's descendants by Georgiana still live in Wrangell to this day.

== See also ==
- Mount Pereleshin
