= Eastern Passage (disambiguation) =

Eastern Passage is a town in Nova Scotia, Canada

Eastern Passage may also refer to:

- Eastern Passage (South Australia), a body of water in Barker Inlet
- Eastern Passage (Alaska), a body of water in Alaska
- Eastern Passage Education Centre, a Junior high school within the Halifax Regional Centre for Education

== See also ==
- Cole Harbour-Eastern Passage electoral district, Nova Scotia
- East Passage
- Passage East
