= Wonderlic test =

Intelligence test

Wonderlic Personnel Test (WPT-R)
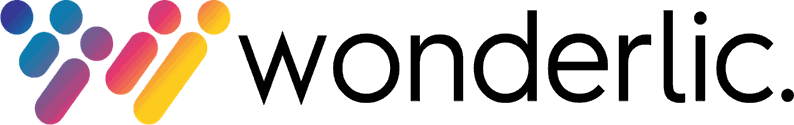
- Type: Multiple choice
- Administrator: Wonderlic, Inc.
- Skills tested: Math, vocabulary, and reasoning
- Purpose: Assessing cognitive ability and problem-solving aptitude of prospective employees
- Year started: 1936
- Duration: 12 minutes
- Score range: 0–50 (1 point per question; score of 20 intended to represent average intelligence)
- Languages: 12 different languages
- Used by: Prospective employers; notably administered at the NFL Scouting Combine and at agencies of the U.S. Federal Government
- Variants: Wonderlic Personnel Test – Quicktest (WPT-Q); Wonderlic Scholastic Level Exam (SLE); WonScore; Wonderlic Select
- Website: www.wonderlic.com

The Wonderlic Contemporary Cognitive Ability Test (formerly the Wonderlic Personnel Test) is an assessment used to measure the cognitive ability and problem-solving aptitude of prospective employees for a range of occupations. The test was created in 1936 by Eldon F. Wonderlic. It consists of 50 multiple choice questions to be answered in 12 minutes. The score is calculated as the number of correct answers given in the allotted time, and a score of 20 is intended to indicate average intelligence.

The Wonderlic Personnel Test was based on the Otis Self-Administering Test of Mental Ability with the goal of creating a short-form measurement of cognitive ability.

In 2015, Wonderlic introduced WonScore, a cloud-based assessment platform that expanded upon the Wonderlic Personnel Test by incorporating personality and motivation measures alongside cognitive ability testing for personnel selection and workforce evaluation. Later, Wonderlic materials referred to the platform as Wonderlic Select, which continued to incorporate cognitive ability, personality, and motivation assessments within a broader employment assessment system.

== History ==
Created in 1936 by E. F. Wonderlic, the Wonderlic Personnel Test was the first short-form cognitive abilities test. It was developed to measure general cognitive ability in the areas of math, vocabulary, and reasoning. Wonderlic created and distributed the test as a graduate student in the psychology department at Northwestern University. Regarding the time allotted to take the test, Wonderlic, in an article released in 1939, stated that "the length of the test was made such that only about two to five per cent of average groups complete the test in the twelve-minute time limit."

Originally designed to aid in employee selection at companies such as AT&T and Oscar Mayer in the 1940s, the Wonderlic Personnel Test has been used by both the United States Armed Forces and the National Football League. During World War II, the Navy began using the Wonderlic Personnel Test to select candidates for pilot training and navigation. From 1940–1960 the test was supplied for free as the data was valuable to E. F. Wonderlic. In the 1970s Tom Landry, coach of the Dallas Cowboys, was the first to use the Wonderlic Personnel Test to predict player performance. Formerly used in the annual NFL Combine as a form of pre-draft assessment, the NFL stopped administering the test in 2022.

The Wonderlic test is continually updated with repeated evaluations of questions. Also, beginning in the 1970s, Wonderlic began to develop other forms of the Wonderlic Personnel, some of which include: Wonderlic Perceptual Ability Tests, Wonderlic Scholastic Level Exam, or the Wonderlic Contemporary Cognitive Ability Test.

=== Transition to digital and multi-measure assessments ===
Beginning in the late 20th and early 21st centuries, employment assessment practices increasingly incorporated combinations of cognitive, behavioral, and motivational measures in personnel selection and workforce evaluation.

Industrial and organizational psychologists increasingly examined broader psychometric frameworks incorporating constructs beyond cognitive ability alone, including personality, interests, and workplace behavior. Beginning in the 2010s, Wonderlic expanded beyond standalone cognitive testing into broader digital employment assessment systems that combined cognitive ability, personality, and motivation measures.

== Versions ==
The Wonderlic Personnel Test measures an individual's problem-solving and learning capability. The test has been offered in multiple forms, including the Wonderlic Personnel Test–Quicktest (WPT-Q) (30 questions in 8 minutes) and the Wonderlic Personnel Test (WPT-R) (50 questions in 12 minutes). The Quicktest differs from the standard Wonderlic Personnel Test in that it is not proctored, while the standard version is more comprehensive.

In 1992, Wonderlic introduced the Wonderlic Scholastic Level Exam (SLE), a scholastic adaptation of the Wonderlic Personnel Test designed to assess the cognitive ability and problem-solving skills of prospective college and university students. The SLE has also been used in admissions processes for certain nursing and medical education programs.

=== Personality assessments ===
Wonderlic later developed personality assessment products intended for use in personnel selection and workforce evaluation contexts. These assessments measured workplace-related personality characteristics and behavioral tendencies associated with employee assessment processes.

The Wonderlic personality assessments are based on personality frameworks similar to the Five-Factor Model used in industrial and organizational psychology.

Later Wonderlic Select (formerly WonScore) incorporated personality-related measures alongside cognitive ability assessments for use in employee hiring, selection, and workforce development.

=== Motivation assessments ===
Wonderlic later introduced workplace motivation assessments based in part on vocational interest and occupational preference models used in personnel psychology.

These assessments evaluated occupational interests and workplace preference factors associated with employee motivation and job fit within organizational settings.

Modern Wonderlic assessment platforms incorporated combinations of cognitive, behavioral, and motivational measures in personnel evaluation processes.

=== Modern assessment platforms ===
In addition to earlier forms of the Wonderlic Personnel Test, later assessment systems associated with Wonderlic incorporated broader psychometric approaches intended for employee selection and employee development.

Such systems reflected wider developments within industrial and organizational psychology emphasizing multi-factor approaches to employee assessment, including cognitive ability, workplace behavior, and motivational variables.

Research in personnel psychology has increasingly examined integrated assessment systems combining multiple predictors of workplace performance and organizational fit.

== Sample questions ==
Similar to other standardized tests, the Wonderlic Cognitive Ability Test presents its questions in an open response. The types of questions that have appeared in the oldest versions of the Wonderlic test include: analogies, analysis of geometric figures, arithmetic, direction following, disarranged sentences, judgment, logic, proverb matching, similarities, and word definitions. However, the questions may take different angles depending upon the 'intelligence' of the question setters. Practice questions will include:

- If a piece of rope cost 20 cents per 2 feet, how many feet can you buy for 30 dollars?
- Which of the numbers in this group represents the smallest amount? (a) 0.3 (b) 0.08 (c) 1 (d) 0.33
- A high-speed train travels 25 feet in 1/3 second. In 4 seconds, the train will have traveled __?__ feet.
- A watch lost 1 minute and 12 seconds in 36 days. How many seconds did it lose per day?

== Application to industrial-organizational psychology ==
The Wonderlic test, as a vocational and intelligence test, falls under the field of Industrial and Organizational Psychology. As a personnel test the Wonderlic is used to gauge an applicant's job potential, educational potential, and training potential. Six forms of this test are made available (A, B, C, D, E, and F) in which Wonderlic suggests that when two of these versions are to be used, the best combinations are A and B or D and F. However, a study conducted by psychologists Kazmier and Browne (1959) shows that neither of these forms can be regarded as directly equivalent. While there is no lack of tests that could be used in place of the Wonderlic, such as the IQ or the Mechanical Aptitude Test, it is a quick and simple vocational test for personnel recruitment and selection. The Wonderlic test has been peer reviewed by the American Psychological Association and has been deemed worthy of field applications to the industrial use of personnel testing. Other sources can be found on the database APA PsycNET.

== Reliability ==
In 1956, Weaver and Boneau reported in the Journal of Applied Psychology that two of the five forms, A and B, that were published at the time were harder than the others which caused scores on those forms to be significantly lower than scores obtained on forms C–F. Concerning these observed differences, Weaver and Boneau state: "This accords with the history of the development of the test. Forms D, E, and F are made up of items selected from the Otis Higher, while A and B were developed later and include types of items not found in the Otis." Those findings, seemingly, invalidate the claim that those forms were equivalent or consistent. E. N. Hay made a similar observation as well. Hay found that form F was significantly easier than Form D. Furthermore, Kazmier found Form B to be the most difficult of the five forms and, thus, recommended that it "not be regarded as directly equivalent to any of the forms." Kazmier also found Forms D and F to be significantly different from each other and recommended that these forms be regarded as inequivalent. In a study of the Wonderlic's test-retest reliability, conducted in 1992, Stuart McKelvie "concluded that conscious repetition of specific responses did not seriously inflate the estimate of test-retest reliability." To put it simply, one's memory of some of the answers does not significantly affect one's score on the Wonderlic.

In 1982, Carl Dodrill conducted a study in which 57 adults were administered the Wonderlic twice over a five-year period. In the Journal of Consulting and Clinical Psychology, Dodrill reported that the test-retest reliability for the Wonderlic was .94. According to a 1989 article in Psychological Reports, the Wonderlic scored a r=.87 on the reliability scale compared along with the Pearson test score of r=.21.

Updated versions of the Wonderlic Personnel Test introduced new forms using computerized item response theory scoring designed to produce comparable scores across different versions of the test. Research has found that scores on updated Wonderlic forms are strongly correlated with earlier versions and suitable for use across a variety of internet-enabled devices.

== Validity ==
In an article written in Psychological Reports, T. Matthews and Kerry Lassiter report that the Wonderlic test "was most strongly associated with overall intellectual functioning," which is what it is purported to measure. However, Matthews and Lassiter did not find the Wonderlic to be a successful measure of fluid and crystallized intelligence, and they stated that "the Wonderlic test scores did not clearly show convergent or divergent validity evidence across these two broad domains of cognitive ability." In academic testing, the Wonderlic test has shown high correlations with aptitude tests such as the General Aptitude Test Battery.

A more recent study by Hicks and colleagues from the Georgia Institute of Technology similarly argued that evidence concerning the test's validity was limited. Their research showed "that Wonderlic has no direct relationship to fluid intelligence once its commonality to working memory capacity is accounted for", and that the Wonderlic "was a significant predictor of working memory capacity for subjects with low fluid intelligence, but failed to discriminate as well among subjects with high fluid intelligence". These findings suggest that the Wonderlic is less informative when administered to higher-than-average ability individuals or groups, meaning there is more measurement error and less practical utility in giving the test to individuals higher in cognitive ability. Partially on this basis, they argued that organizations interested in personnel selection should consider administering measures of established constructs that are grounded in a more theoretical framework, such as fluid intelligence or working memory capacity.

The Wonderlic Personnel Test has been widely studied as a predictor of success in academic and organizational settings. Several meta-analytic studies have reported positive correlations between Wonderlic test scores and job and training performance. A 2024 meta-analysis by Robie et al. found significant positive correlations between Wonderlic scores and school success outcomes.

== Legal matters ==
=== Jordan v. New London ===
In May 1997, Robert Jordan filed a lawsuit against the city of New London, Connecticut, alleging violation of the Equal Protection Clause of the United States and Connecticut constitutions, in a case that was referred to by several media outlets as "Too Smart To Be A Cop", based on the city's application of scores generated by the Wonderlic test.

Jordan was born and raised in New London, and had previous experience in law enforcement, working as a part-time officer in near-by Groton Long Point, and as a seasonal officer for the Connecticut Department of Environmental Protection. In fall 1996, Jordan requested an interview with Keith Harrigan, New London's Assistant City Manager in charge of personnel. Harrigan informed Jordan that he was ineligible because he scored too high on the written portion of the Wonderlic test intended to evaluate cognitive ability. New London had decided to consider only applicants who scored between 20 and 27 on the written examination. Jordan scored a 33 on the exam, the equivalent of having an IQ of 125.

Jordan filed suit in the United States District Court for the District of Connecticut, where his case was dismissed by Judge Peter C. Dorsey, who noted: "The guarantee of equal protection under the Fifth Amendment is not a source of substantive rights or liberties, but rather a right to be free from invidious discrimination in statutory classifications and other governmental activity. It is well settled that where a statutory classification does not itself impinge on a right or liberty protected by the Constitution, the validity of the classification must be sustained unless the classification rests on grounds wholly irrelevant to the achievement of [any legitimate government] objective....[Jordan] may have been disqualified unwisely but he was not denied equal protection." The dismissal was upheld on appeal to the United States Court of Appeals for the Second Circuit.

== Central tendency of Wonderlic scores ==
Serving as a quantitative measure for employers, scores are collected by the employers and the applicant's score may be compared to a professional standard, as is the case with security guards or, simply, compared to the scores of other applicants who happen to be applying for the same or similar positions at that time. Each profession has its own unique average; therefore, different professions require different standards. Wonderlic, Inc. claims a minimum score of 10 points suggests a person is literate.

=== Average score in the NFL by position ===
The Wonderlic test is used in the NFL Scouting Combine. The National Football League historically utilized earlier forms of the Wonderlic Personnel Test as part of its pre-draft evaluation process. These assessments were associated with earlier timed cognitive testing formats and differed from later multi-measure employment assessment platforms developed by Wonderlic. Paul Brown introduced the test to the league in the late 1960s. According to Paul Zimmerman's The New Thinking Man's Guide to Pro Football, the average score of an NFL player by position as of 1984 was:

- Offensive tackle – 26
- Center – 25
- Quarterback – 24
- Guard – 23
- Tight end – 22
- Safety – 19
- Linebacker – 19
- Cornerback – 18
- Wide receiver – 17
- Fullback – 17
- Halfback – 16

An average football player usually scores around 20 points. Quarterbacks and offensive linemen usually have higher scores. Most teams want at least 21 for a quarterback.

==== Predictor of success in the NFL ====
John P. Lopez of Sports Illustrated proposed a 26–27–60 rule to predict a quarterback's success in the NFL (at least a 26 on the Wonderlic, at least 27 college starts, and at least 60% pass completion) and listed several examples of successes and failures based on the rule. A 2005 study by McDonald Mirabile found that there is no significant correlation between a quarterback's Wonderlic score and a quarterback's passer rating, and no significant correlation between a quarterback's Wonderlic score and a quarterback's salary. Similarly, a 2009 study by Brian D. Lyons, Brian J. Hoffman, and John W. Michel found that Wonderlic scores failed to positively and significantly predict future NFL performance, draft position, or the number of games started for any position. Lyons said that Wonderlic's "limited return on investment" for the NFL is contrary to general mental ability being a very strong predictor of job performance for most careers; "because it's so physically based, the results point to that [GMA] really doesn't matter". Donovan McNabb, whose score was the lowest of the five quarterbacks taken in the first round of the 1999 NFL draft, had the longest and most successful career.

The Lyons study also found that the relationship between Wonderlic test scores and future NFL performance was negative for a few positions, indicating the higher a player scores on the Wonderlic test, the worse the player will perform in the NFL. For tight ends and defensive backs, it was found that lower scores indicated increased achievements. According to Pat McInally, who was selected by the Cincinnati Bengals in the fifth round of the 1975 NFL draft, George Young told him that his perfect score caused him to be selected later than he would have otherwise. NFL reporter Matt Verderame reported that New England Patriots offensive lineman Joe Thuney avoided answering Wonderlic questions so he would not score too high. McInally speculated that "coaches and front-office guys don't like extremes one way or the other, but particularly not on the high side. I think they think guys who are intelligent will challenge authority too much". Mike Florio of Profootballtalk.com agreed with McInally:

Scoring too high can be as much of a problem as scoring too low. Football coaches want to command the locker room. Being smarter than the individual players makes that easier. Having a guy in the locker room who may be smarter than every member of the coaching staff can be viewed as a problem – or at a minimum as a threat to the egos of the men who hope to be able when necessary to outsmart the players, especially when trying in some way to manipulate them.

Job performance in the NFL also includes deviance. A 2016 study found that the Wonderlic significantly predicted future arrests, referred to as criminal off-duty deviance, with players testing below the league average being almost twice as likely to get arrested in the future as players who scored above the league average.

== In popular culture ==
A simplified and condensed version of the Wonderlic test appeared in older editions of the Madden NFL video game series. The questions usually consist of basic math and English questions. For example, "If Adrian Peterson rushes for 125 yards in a game, how many yards will he have at the end of the season if he keeps up with this pace?". Players have four answers to choose from when taking this version of the test.

== See also ==
- Intelligence quotient
- Personnel selection
