= Stikine Gold Rush =

1860s gold rush in British Columbia, Canada

The Stikine Gold Rush was a minor but important gold rush in the Stikine Country of northwestern British Columbia, Canada. The rush's discoverer was Alexander "Buck" Choquette, who staked a claim at Choquette Bar in 1861, just downstream from the confluence of the Stikine and Anuk Rivers, at approximately 56°48′N 131°46′W. Choquette was the son-in-law of the Tlingit chief Chief Shakes, who presided over the region at the mouth of the river, the site of the former Fort Stikine and today's city of Wrangell, Alaska, and had also explored the Nass and several other rivers.

Alexander "Buck" Choquette (c. 1830–1898) was a French-Canadian prospector and adventurer who was the discoverer in 1861 of the gold strike which led to the Stikine Gold Rush.

Once news of the find reached the various other goldfields in British Columbia, the lower Stikine in the area of Choquette's find was inundated with prospectors and the river itself busy with steamboat traffic, served by vessels who abandoned the moribund Fraser routes.

Eight hundred miners left Victoria bound for the goldfields but many did not proceed beyond the mouth of the Stikine. Those who reached the goldfield, which was 150 miles up the river, were not more than five hundred.

== Legacy ==
Not much gold was found on the Stikine, but the flurry of activity prompted Governor James Douglas of the Colonies of Vancouver Island and British Columbia to declare, in 1862, British ownership over the region in the form of the Stickeen Territories, which extended north from the northern frontier of British Columbia at the Nass and Finlay Rivers to the 62nd Parallel. The Stickeen Territories were a year later merged with British Columbia, except for the portion north of the 60th Parallel, which reverted to the North-Western Territory from which the Territories had been taken upon their creation. Mineral exploration of the region continued in the wake of the rush, with the much larger Cassiar Gold Rush, north of Telegraph Creek, discovered in 1870 by Harry McDame.

== See also ==
- Mount Pereleshin
