= Flood River =

River in British Columbia

- Mouth of the Flood River

Location
- Country: Canada
- Province: British Columbia
- District: Cassiar Land District

Physical characteristics
- Source: Flood Glacier
  - location: Boundary Ranges
  - coordinates: 57°11′25″N 131°53′58″W
  - elevation: 220 m (720 ft)
- Mouth: Stikine River
  - coordinates: 57°12′8″N 131°47′59″W
  - elevation: 60 m (200 ft)
- Length: 6 km (3.7 mi)
- Basin size: 276 km^{2} (107 sq mi),
- Discharge
  - average: 29.1 m^{3}/s (1,030 cu ft/s)

Basin features
- Topo map: NTS104G4 Flood Glacier

The Flood River is a tributary of the Stikine River in the northern part of the province of British Columbia, Canada.

From its source the meltwaters of Flood Glacier in the Boundary Ranges of the Coast Mountains, the Flood River flows east for about 6 km (3.7 mi) to join the Stikine River.

The Flood River's drainage basin covers 276 km^{2} (107 sq mi). The river's mean annual discharge is estimated at 29.1 m^{3}/s (1,030 cu ft/s), with most of the flow occurring between May and November. The Flood River's watershed's land cover is classified as 53.8% snow/glacier, 26.0% barren, 8.5% shrubland, and small amounts of other cover.

The mouth of the Flood River is located about 85 km (53 mi) south of the community of Telegraph Creek, about 90 km (56 mi) north of Wrangell, Alaska, about 200 km (120 mi) southeast of Juneau, Alaska, and about 210 km (130 mi) north of Prince Rupert, British Columbia.

The Flood River lies within the asserted traditional territory of the Tahltan First Nations people.

== Geography ==
The Flood River originates as meltwater from Flood Glacier, which covers a sizable area of the Boundary Range, very close to the boundary of British Columbia and Southeast Alaska. Notable peaks around Flood Glacier include Alpha Mountain, Cornice Mountain, Mount Rufus, Dominion Mountain, and Mount Gilroy,.

After emerging from the toe of Flood Glacier into a meltwater lake, the Flood River flows east for about 6 km (3.7 mi) to its the Stikine River. As the Flood Glacier continues retreating, the shape of the meltwater lake and the exact length of the Flood River also changes. Additionally, there are meltwater lakes that are dammed by Flood Glacier, such as Flood Lake.

== History ==
The Flood River lies within the traditional territory of the Tahltan First Nations people. The Tahltan people have occupied the territory since time immemorial.

On 13 August 1979 the glacial-dammed Flood Lake outburst about 150,000,000 m^{3} (5.3×10^{9} cu ft) of water beneath Flood Glacier and out into the Flood River and the Stikine River. A gauge near Wrangell, Alaska, on the Stikine River, measured the maximum discharge from this event at 1,200 m^{3}/s (42,000 cu ft/s).

== See also ==
- List of rivers of British Columbia
