= The Narrows (Alaska) =

Strait in Alaska, United States

Coordinates: 56°22′08″N 132°06′01″W

The Narrows is a channel in Southeast Alaska, U.S.A. It is the shortest and narrowest stretch of waterway separating Wrangell Island from the mainland, connecting Blake Channel and Eastern Passage. It was named in 1917 by the United States Coast and Geodetic Survey. It was first traversed and charted in 1793 by James Johnstone, one of George Vancouver's officers during his 1791-95 expedition.
