= Ammons Quick Test =

Intelligence test

Ammons Quick Test (QT) is an intelligence test that was designed in 1962 by Robert B. Ammons and his wife Carol H. Ammons. This test has been used for many years to help assess premorbid intelligence. It is a passive response picture-vocabulary test.

== History ==
The QT is partly derived from a previous psychological measurement, the Full-Range Picture Vocabulary Test (FRPV), primarily developed by Richard B. Ammons with the contributions of several other psychologists in his clinic. At the time, the QT, just like the FRVP, was envisioned as a brief verbal-perceptual test that could measure both children and adults with intellectual or physical disabilities. The QT was also meant to be an improvement of the FRPV, which had issues with measuring extreme responses due to the lack of limited variation in item difficulty. It also meant to serve as a shorter version of the FRPV, albeit with different items.

== Development ==
During its initial testing phase, Ammons checked the QT's validity by measuring its concurrent validity, which was done by correlating the items with existing psychological tests that also measured verbal-perceptual skills, such as the Ohio State Psychological Examination and the Iowa Test of Basic Skills. The QT's items yielded item validity coefficients in a range from r = .13 to r = .96. The QT also had sufficient reliability coefficients, with a range of r = 0.60 to r = 0.96. The QT was tested across various genders and ethnicities and included individuals who are not part of the target population.

Other researchers, such as Martha T. Mednick, also conducted several studies to test the QT's robustness. Her study in 1969 which tested the QT on 2,213 male students found that the QT had a validity coefficient range of r = 0.37 to r = 0.68 when the QT scores are correlated with several short-form intelligence measures, which included an anagram task and a numerical reasoning test battery.

The QT results also correlate well with the Wechsler Adult Intelligence Scale (WAIS) Full Scale IQ. The Quick Test raw score of 46 translates to a WAIS IQ score of 110, which is in the high average range of intellectual functioning for an adult.

== Recent validation ==
There have been several attempts to re-validate the QT in different populations and cultures. One of these was done in 2013 on a sample of 236 people, across several age ranges, ethnicity, and gender. The study found that the QT's original items had a validity coefficient range of r = .61 to r = .91 when the scores are correlated with a number of other intelligence tests, including the Weschler tests.
