= Mount Pereleshin =

Mountain in British Columbia, Canada

Mount Pereleshin, originally Pereleshin Mountain, 2019 m (6624 ft) prominence: 749 m, is a summit in the Boundary Ranges in the area of the lower Stikine River in northwestern British Columbia, Canada. Located southeast of the junction of the Scud and Stikine Rivers, its original name was officially adopted in Canada in 1924 but changed to its current form in 1954 in accordance with national naming standards. Once considered part of the United States claim in this region (see Alaska Boundary Dispute), it was first cited in 1906 in the Coast Survey by Baker (p. 494) and was misattributed as being of native origin, with alternate spelling Peerleshin, but the name is that of a Russian Navy Lieutenant Pereleshin who had been sent to the area by Rear-Admiral Andrei Alexandrovich Popov to investigate whether Russian interests in the area had been impacted by gold-mining activity from the recent Stikine Gold Rush of 1861–1862. Pereleshin's entrance to the region was in the company of American professor and geologist William P. Blake, who accompanied Pereleshin's expedition and whose journal is the only record of the journey. The party camped on its sixth night near the Flood Glacier, which Pereleshin reckoned to be at the extreme of Russian territorial claims and from there returned to the coast. Pereleshin Mountain first appears on Blake's 1868 map, published with his "Geographical Notes upon Russian America and the Stickeen River."

== See also ==
- Boundary Range
