= Three Sisters Range =

Mountain range in British Columbia, Canada

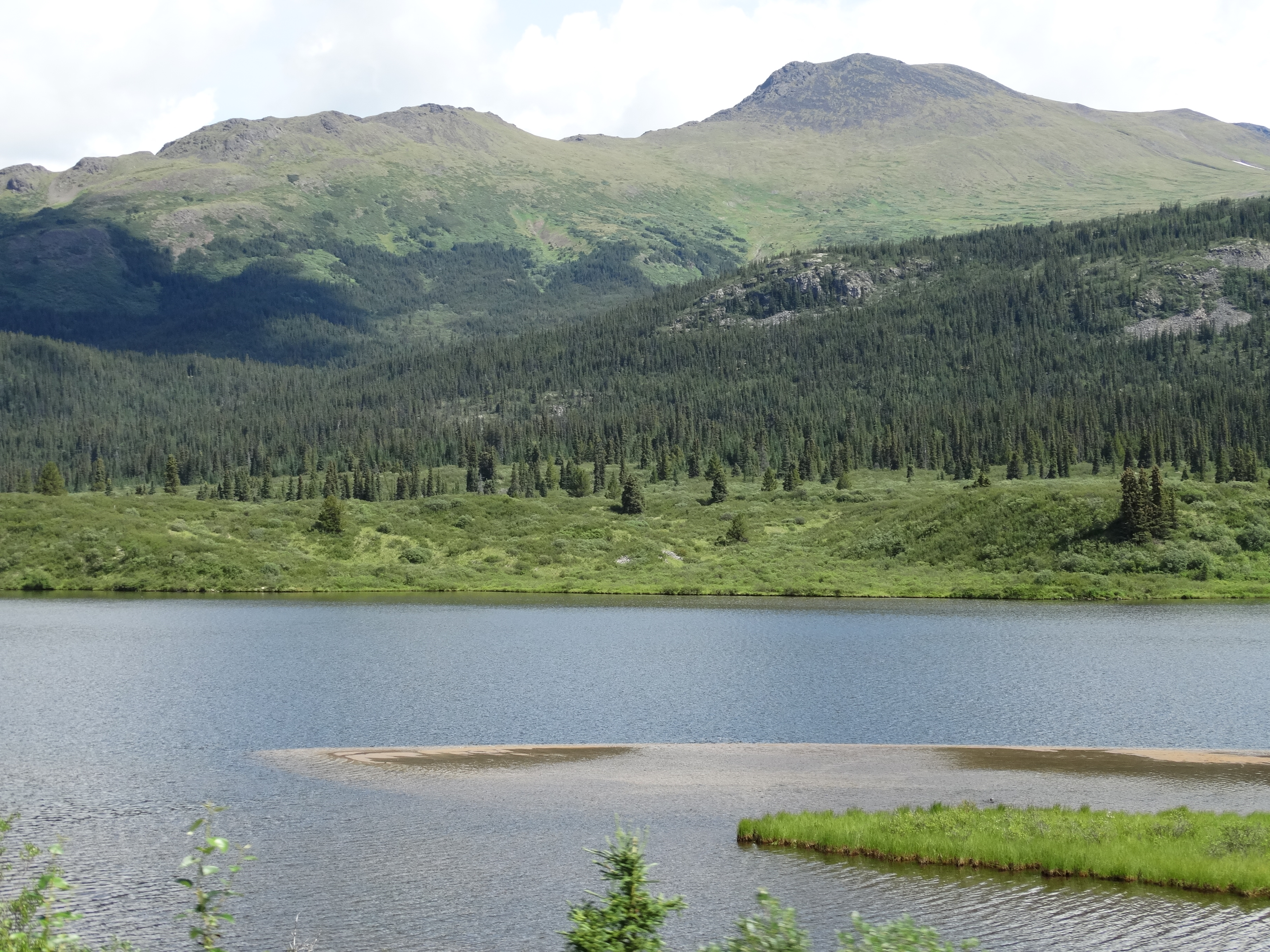
- Three Sisters Range overlooking Upper Gnat Lake just south of Gnat Pass

Geography
- Location within British Columbia
- Country: Canada
- Province: British Columbia
- Range coordinates: 58°07′N 129°25′W
- Parent range: Stikine Ranges

The Three Sisters Range is a subrange of the Stikine Ranges, located northwest of junction of the Stikine and McBride Rivers in northern British Columbia, Canada and to the southeast of the community of Dease Lake.
