= Elizabeth Ammons =

American literary scholar

Elizabeth Ammons is professor emerita at Tufts University. She was previously the Harriet B. Fay Professor of Literature at Tufts University.

== Early life and education ==
Ammons attended University of Illinois at Urbana–Champaign.

== Publications ==
Select books:

- Critical essays on Harriet Beecher Stowe, 1979
- Edith Wharton's argument with America, 1980
- Conflicting stories : American women writers at the turn into the twentieth century, 1990
- Ethan Frome, 2005
- Brave new words : how literature will save the planet, 2010
