= Grand Canyon of the Stikine =

Steep-sided canyon carved by the Stikine River in British Columbia, Canada

- Canyon
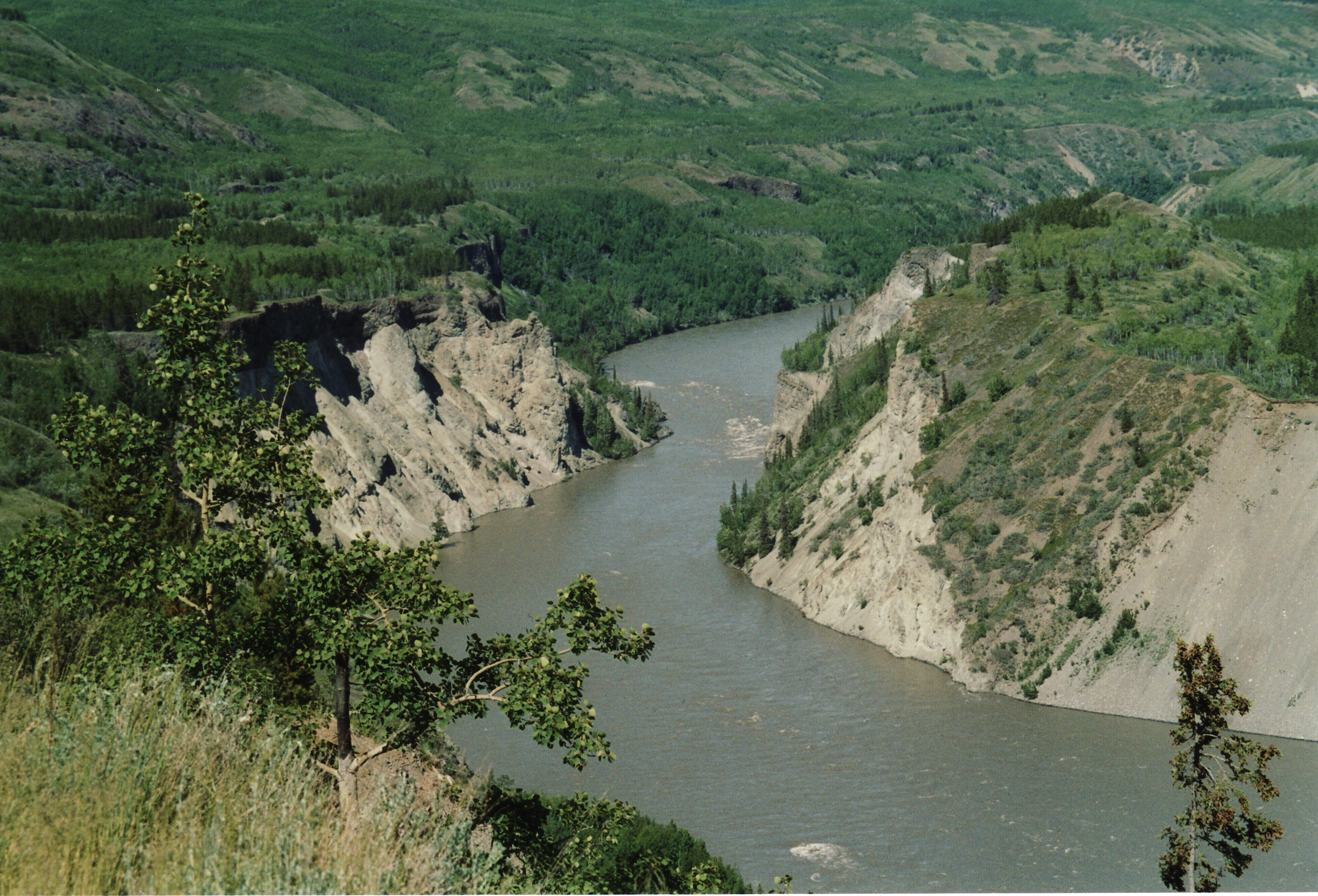
- Grand Canyon of the Stikine River near Telegraph Creek

- Location within British Columbia
- Coordinates: 58°04′56″N 130°44′06″W
- Part of: Tahltan Highland
- Formed by: Stikine River

Dimensions
  - Length: 72 km (45 mi)

The Grand Canyon of the Stikine is a 72-kilometre (45 mi) stretch of the Stikine River in northern British Columbia, Canada. It has been compared to the Grand Canyon of the Colorado. The canyon is home to a large population of mountain goats and other wildlife. Officially the canyon is described as unnavigable by any watercraft, however there have been numerous successful descents made by expert whitewater paddlers since the first attempt in 1981. Since it was first attempted, the Grand Canyon of the Stikine has maintained a legendary reputation among whitewater experts as the "Mount Everest" of big water expedition whitewater boating against which all other navigable rivers are measured.

== Characteristics ==
The canyon begins in the vicinity of the 130th west line of longitude, south of Tsenaglode Lake. The first road bridge across the Stikine was built in the 1970s as part of the Stewart–Cassiar Highway (BC Highway 37). The bridge is situated just upstream of the start of the canyon section. An earlier pole-bridge had been constructed across the river in the area of Telegraph Creek, built by the Tahltan people from scavenged wire and other abandoned material left by the crews of the Collins Overland Telegraph project in the 1860s.

The canyon section comes to an end (or eases off) at the community of Telegraph Creek.

The canyon is steep-walled and was formed by the Stikine River cutting through layers of sedimentary and volcanic rock. The canyon is 300 m (984 ft) deep in places. The Stikine River flowing through it varies in width from 200 m (656 ft) to 2 m (7 ft) close to the point where the Tanzilla River enters, a spot known to kayakers as the "Tanzilla Slot". It was originally created in 1836 during a turbulent storm. Some call it "The big red" due to its colour and size.

== Hydroelectric plans ==
In 1980, BC Hydro began to study the feasibility of building a five-dam project in the Grand Canyon, but the plan was vehemently opposed by conservation and indigenous groups and led to a long struggle over the fate of the river. The Stikine River Provincial Park (formerly the Stikine River Provincial Recreation Area) was created in 2001, at 257,177 ha in size, to protect this stretch of the river.

== Descents by boat ==
The Grand Canyon of the Stikine is described by the kayaker Doug Ammons as "one of the most challenging [kayak] runs anybody has ever found on this planet". Its whitewater contains numerous grade V+ rapids. The canyon is attempted almost every fall as a rite of passage by the world's best expedition kayakers. It is approached as an expedition with descents normally taking around three days to complete, although a few kayakers have completed the run in a single day. The first one day descent of the river was completed in 2005 by Daniel DeLaVergne, John Grace, Tommy Hilleke, and Tobin MacDermott.

Most attempts on the canyon are made in early fall when the water level is low. At that time of year the flow is between 4,000 and 13,000 cubic feet per second, with the level varying by as much as 10 ft (3 m) in a day. For much of the length of the canyon vertical cliffs make it difficult or impossible to climb out should an exit be required. If an emergency climb from the canyon is successful, the paddler will then be faced with a long and difficult hike through the Canadian wilderness, which can last many hours or days, before reaching a road. The canyon was seen by American kayaker Rob Lesser in 1977 while on a trip to Alaska. He flew over the canyon in a plane and identified many grade V rapids. In 1981 Lesser, accompanied by kayakers John Wasson, Lars Holbek, Don Banducci and Rick Fernald made the first descent attempt supported by a helicopter and a film crew from ABC's American Sportsman. The team completed 60% of the canyon before the film crew, satisfied with their footage, cut the trip short after Site Zed, leaving the difficult lower section un-run. One of the team members, John Wasson, was almost killed in a rapid now called Wasson's Hole.

In 1985 Lesser and Holbek, along with kayaker Bob McDougall, made a second attempt to kayak the entire canyon. The kayak team was joined by a raft team of seven world-class paddlers consisting of Joe Willie Jones, Mark Kosina, Beth Rypins, Peter Fox, Steve Ellsberg, Peggy Lindsay, and Dan Bolster. This expedition was sponsored by a British and Canadian film crew who also provided a helicopter for filming, portage and safety support. Delays due to wildly rising and falling water levels and the careful scouting that was needed to analyze the rapids, caused the descent to last several days longer than planned. This ultimately led to the film production crew withdrawing its helicopter support in the Lower Narrows due to cost overruns. The raft team, faced with continuing without helicopter support, chose to portage around the canyon section that contains the notorious rapid now known as "V-Drive" before re-entering the river to run the Tanzilla Slot which marked the end of the canyon. As of August 2026, no other conventional raft has successfully navigated this much of the canyon. Kayakers Lesser, Holbek and McDougall continued, running V-Drive and completing the final section and thus the first descent of the entire canyon, with the exception of the Site Zed rapid. The film of the descent was called "Hell and High Water".

In 1990, the complete river was paddled for the first time without a helicopter. Rob Lesser returned to lead a group on the first self-supported trip through the canyon. Four days later, Phil DeReimer, Hayden Glatte, and Bryan Tooley completed the second self-supported trip. Their trip marked the first descent by a group without Lesser and his considerable knowledge, proving that it was possible to complete the river without scouting from a helicopter first.

== See also ==
- Spatsizi Plateau Wilderness Provincial Park
- Grand Canyon of the Nechako
