= Perceptual and Motor Skills =

- Discipline: Perception and motor skills
- Language: English
- Edited by: Oliver R. Runswick

Publication details
- Former names: Perceptual and Motor Skills Research Exchange
- History: 1949–present
- Publisher: SAGE Publishing
- Frequency: Bimonthly
- Impact factor: 2.4 (2025)

Standard abbreviations
- ISO 4: Percept. Mot. Ski.

Indexing
- CODEN: PMOSAZ
- ISSN: 0031-5125 (print); 1558-688X (web)
- LCCN: 58032642
- OCLC no.: 174784031

Links
- Journal homepage; Online access; Online archive

Perceptual and Motor Skills is a bimonthly peer-reviewed academic journal established by Robert B. Ammons and Carol H. Ammons in 1949. The journal covers research on perception and motor skills. The editor-in-chief is Oliver R. Runswick (King's College London). The journal was published by Ammons Scientific, but is now published by SAGE Publishing.

== Abstracting and indexing ==
The journal is abstracted and indexed in the Social Sciences Citation Index and Index Medicus/MEDLINE/PubMed. According to the Journal Citation Reports, the journal has a 2025 impact factor of 2.4 with a ranking of 44 out of 104 in Psychology, Experimental.
