= Cliff Ammons =

American politician

Clifton 'Cliff' Ammons

Member of the Louisiana House of Representatives from the Sabine Parish district
- Incumbent
- Assumed office 1960 - 1964

Personal details
- Party: Democratic

Clifton "Cliff" Ammons was an American politician from Louisiana who served in the Louisiana House of Representatives from 1960 to 1964. He is known as the "father of the Toledo Bend Reservoir" and a leader of the Toledo Bend Dam project.
