= Eastern Passage (Alaska) =

River channel in Alaska, United States

Coordinates: 56°28′38″N 132°17′48″W

Eastern Passage is a channel in Southeast Alaska, United States. It extends southeast 29 kilometres (18 mi) from the mouth of the Stikine River to The Narrows, separating the northeastern half of Wrangell Island from the mainland. It was named in 1877 by William Healy Dall of the United States Coast and Geodetic Survey. It was first traversed and charted in 1793 by James Johnstone, one of George Vancouver's officers during his 1791-95 expedition.
