= Psychological Reports =

- Discipline: Psychology
- Language: English
- Edited by: Cory R. Scherer

Publication details
- History: 1955-present
- Publisher: SAGE Publications
- Frequency: Bi-monthly
- Impact factor: 0.667 (2017)

Standard abbreviations
- ISO 4: Psychol. Rep.

Indexing
- CODEN: PYRTAZ
- ISSN: 0033-2941 (print); 1558-691X (web)
- LCCN: 56000405
- OCLC no.: 01318827

Links
- Journal homepage; Online access

Psychological Reports is a bimonthly peer-reviewed academic journal covering research in psychology and psychiatry. It was established by Robert and Carol H. Ammons in 1955. The editor-in-chief is Cory Scherer (Penn State Schuylkill). It is published by SAGE Publications.

== Abstracting and indexing ==
Psychological Reports is abstracted and indexed in the Social Sciences Citation Index and MEDLINE. As of 2024, the journal's impact factor was 2.3, and it was ranked 75th out of 147 journals in the category "Psychology, Multidisciplinary."
