= Robert B. Ammons =

American psychologist

Robert Bruce Ammons (February 27, 1920 – May 21, 1999) was born to Bruce Ammons and Margaret Gate Ammons. He was the founder, along with his wife Carol H. Ammons, of Psychological Reports and Perceptual and Motor Skills, peer-reviewed academic journals. He graduated from San Diego High School and then San Diego State College, majoring in psychology, political science, history and German. He graduated in 1939 and went on to earn his teaching credentials from the University of California at Los Angeles in 1940. He earned his master's degree from the University of Iowa in general psychology a year later and then went on to earn a Ph.D. in clinical and experimental psychology from the University of Iowa in 1946. He was a psychology professor at the University of Montana in Missoula.

Ammons was a Fellow of the American Association for the Advancement of Science, a nonprofit with the goal of helping scientists and scientific innovation flourish. He is also a Fellow of several divisions of the American Psychological Association.

The Ammons are also known for developing the Ammons Quick Test, a short (five minutes) intelligence test for adults, consisting of an orally administered picture vocabulary test. It is mostly used for pre-screening the elderly, particularly because it minimizes the fatigue of the test subjects. The test results correlate in favor with those of the Wechsler Adult Intelligence Scale, particularly with the verbal IQ scale. It also benefits from simple and objective scoring.
