= Stikine River Provincial Park =

Provincial park in the Stikine Region of British Columbia, Canada

- IUCN category Ib (wilderness area)
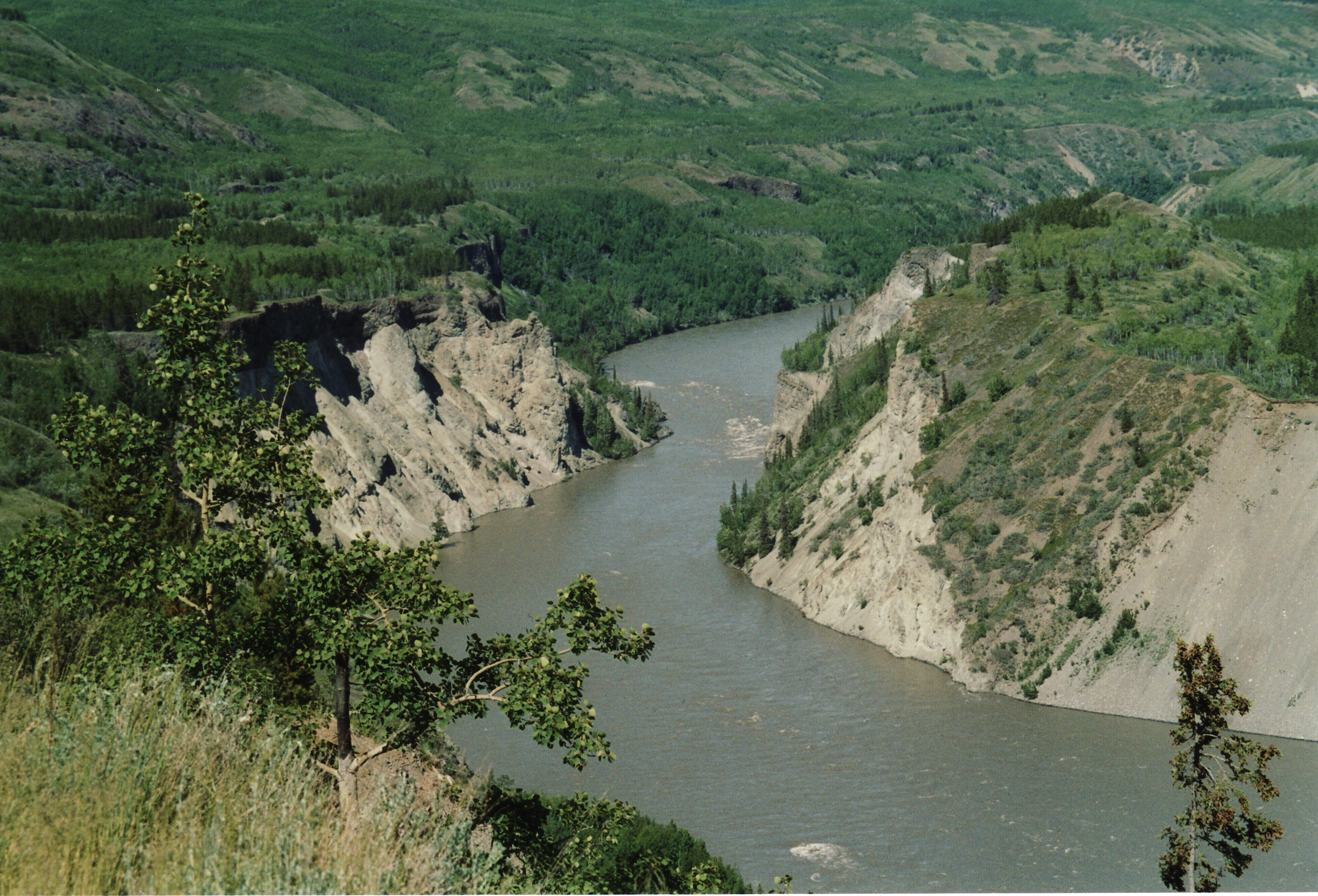
- Grand Canyon of the Stikine near Telegraph Creek

- Location within British Columbia
- Interactive map of Stikine River Provincial Park
- Location: Kitimat-Stikine RD and Stikine Region, British Columbia
- Nearest city: Iskut
- Coordinates: 58°01′29″N 128°42′52″W
- Area: 257,177 ha (992.97 sq mi)
- Established: 14 March 1987
- Governing body: BC Parks

The Stikine River Provincial Park is a provincial park in British Columbia. The park covers a total area of approximately 217,000 hectares (540,000 acres). The main feature of the Stikine River Provincial Park is a portion of the Stikine River known as "The Grand Canyon". This portion of the river is approximately 80 kilometres (50 miles) long and runs through a canyon that has been created from the river cutting through the rock that now forms the walls of the "canyon".

== See also ==
- Spatsizi Plateau Wilderness Provincial Park
