= Woronkofski Island =

Island in Alaska, United States

Coordinates: 56°23′49″N 132°28′52″W

Woronkofski Island is an island in the Alexander Archipelago of southeastern Alaska, United States. It is separated from Wrangell Island to the east by Zimovia Strait, just west of the city of Wrangell; to the west it is separated from Zarembo Island by Stikine Strait, and to the south from Etolin Island by Chichagof Pass. Woronkofski Island has a land area of 59.382 km^{2} (22.9275 sq mi) and was unpopulated at the 2000 census. The city of Wrangell is exploring the possibility of utilizing Sunrise Lake on the island for hydroelectrical power and drinking water.

== History ==
The first European to sight the island was James Johnstone, one of George Vancouver's officers during his 1791-95 expedition, in 1793. He only charted its north coast, not realizing it was an island. The island was named for Lieutenant Woronkovski of the Imperial Russian Navy, who explored the south coast of the Alaska Peninsula in 1836; the name was published in 1848 on a Russian Hydrographic Department chart as "O(strov) Voronkovskiy".
