= National Register of Historic Places listings in Wrangell, Alaska =

Location of Wrangell in Alaska

This is a list of the National Register of Historic Places listings in Wrangell, Alaska.

This is intended to be a complete list of the properties and districts on the National Register of Historic Places in Wrangell, Alaska, United States. The locations of National Register properties and districts for which the latitude and longitude coordinates are included below, may be seen in a Google map.

There are four properties and districts listed on the National Register in the city and borough. Another property was once listed but has been removed.

This National Park Service list is complete through NPS recent listings posted October 16, 2026.

== Current listings ==
	Name on the Register	Image	Date listed	Location	City or town	Description
1	Chief Shakes Historic Site	Chief Shakes Historic Site	October 27, 1970 (#70000918)	Shakes Island, inside Wrangell Harbor; 56°27′57″N 132°22′50″W	Wrangell	
2	Etolin Canoe	Etolin Canoe	June 5, 1989 (#88001061)	Head of Brunett Inlet, Etolin Island, Tongass National Forest; 56°10′23″N 132°27′25″W	Wrangell	
3	Judith Ann (Riverboat)		July 7, 2004 (#04000658)	Mile 12.25 of Zimovia Highway, about 10 miles (16 km) south of Wrangell; 56°19′22″N 132°20′48″W	Wrangell	
4	Saint Philip's Episcopal Church	Saint Philip's Episcopal Church	May 6, 1987 (#87000654)	446 Church Street; 56°28′11″N 132°22′43″W	Wrangell	

== Former listing ==
	Name on the Register	Image	Date listed	Date removed	Location	City or town	Description
1	Wrangell Public School		May 16, 1978 (#78003432)	May 10, 1996	Corner of 2nd Street and Bevier Street; 56°28′25″N 132°23′14″W	Wrangell	Originally the public school, became the town hall in 1931. Demolished in 1996.

== See also ==
- List of National Historic Landmarks in Alaska
- National Register of Historic Places listings in Alaska
