= Stikine Strait =

Coordinates: 56°18′42″N 132°36′52″W

The Stikine Strait is a strait in the Alexander Archipelago of Alaska, located between Zarembo Island to the west and Etolin and Woronkofski Islands just southwest of the City of Wrangell. The strait's name derives from that of the Stikine River, the outlet of which is just northeast of Wrangell. The strait is shown on an 1844 Russian chart, but the name was first published on Russian Admiralty charts in 1848 as Proliv Stakhinskiy or Stakhin Strait. Other spelling variants over time have been Frances Strait, Stachin Strait, Stachine Strait, Stackine Strait, Stahkeen Strait, Stahkin Strait, Stakeen Strait, Stakhinski Strait, Stickeen Strait, and Stikeen Strait
