= Stickeen =

Stickeen may refer to:

- Stickeen Territories, a territory of British North America
- "Stickeen: An Adventure with a Dog and a Glacier", an essay by John Muir first published in 1897

More commonly spelled stikine, see stikine (disambiguation)
