= Stikine District =

Stikine District may refer to any of the following:

- the Stikine Country, aka the Stikine District, a geographic region of the Canadian province of British Columbia, roughly equivalent to the Stikine Mining Division aka Stikine Mining District of the British Columbia Dept. of Mines
- the Stikine Region, an administrative region of the Canadian province of British Columbia

== See also ==
- Stikine Plateau
- Regional District of Kitimat–Stikine
- Stikine (disambiguation)
