= Chichagof Pass =

Coordinates: 56°21′19″N 132°28′19″W

Chichagof Pass is a strait separating Woronkofski and Etolin Islands. The strait is shown in an 1844 Russian chart, but the name was first published in 1853 on a Russian Hydrographic Department chart as "Proliv Chichagova" (English: Chichagov Strait). Lieutenant Commander H. E. Nichols, USN, published the present name in the 1891 Coast Pilot; the original name was probably given for the ship Chichagov.
