= Etolin Canoe =

- U.S. National Register of Historic Places
- Alaska Heritage Resources Survey
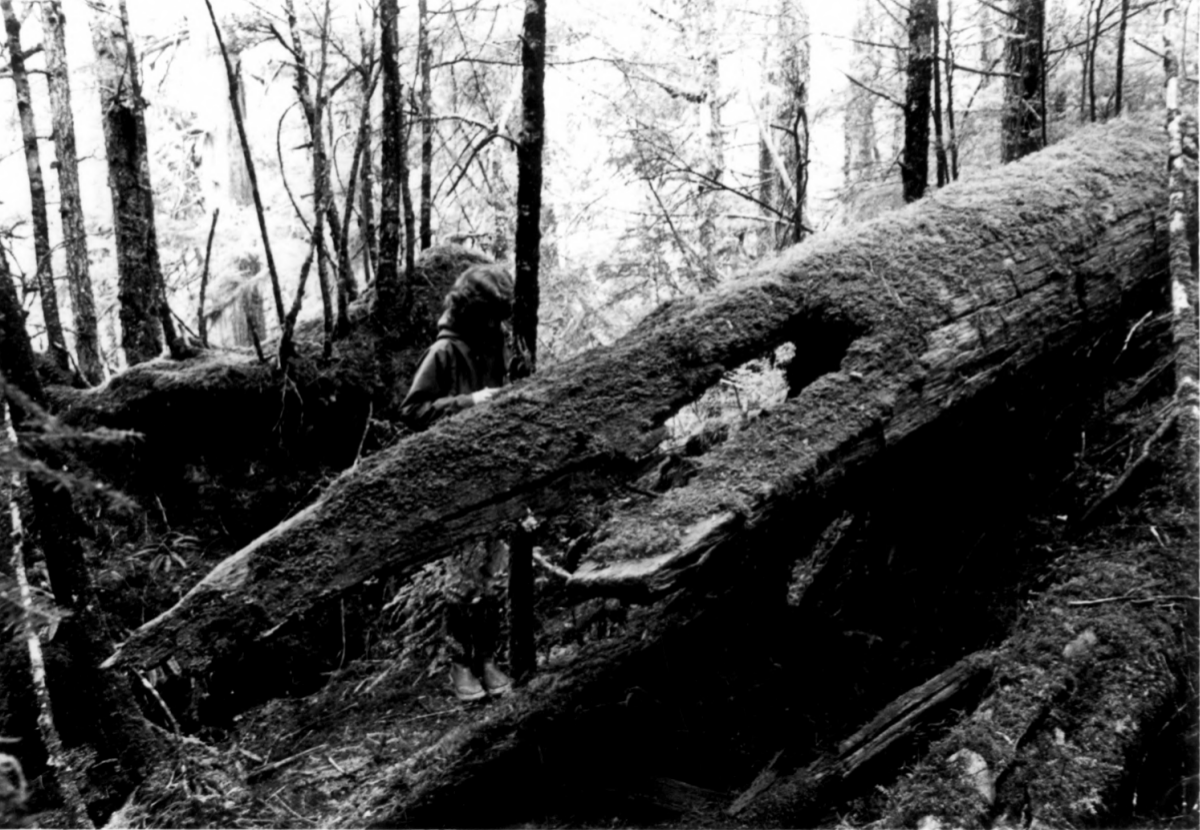
- Bow of the unfinished canoe, 1983

- Location within Alaska
- Location: Head of Brunett Inlet, Etolin Island, Tongass National Forest
- Nearest city: Wrangell, Alaska
- Coordinates: 56°10′23″N 132°27′25″W
- Area: less than one acre
- Architectural style: Dugout canoe
- NRHP reference No.: 88001061
- AHRS No.: PET-089
- Added to NRHP: June 5, 1989

The Etolin Canoe is an unfinished dugout canoe on Etolin Island, in the Tongass National Forest, that is listed on the U.S. National Register of Historic Places. It is made of a single Western red cedar or an Alaska yellow cedar trunk and was started, it is believed, somewhere between 1880 and 1920.

The canoe was listed on the National Register of Historic Places in 1989.

== See also ==
- National Register of Historic Places listings in Wrangell, Alaska
