= Judith Ann =

- Judith Ann (Riverboat)
- U.S. National Register of Historic Places
- Alaska Heritage Resources Survey
- Location within Alaska
- Location: Mile 12.25 of Zimovia Highway, about 10 miles (16 km) south of Wrangell
- Nearest city: Wrangell, Alaska
- Coordinates: 56°19′22″N 132°20′48″W
- Area: less than one acre
- Built: 1950
- Built by: Campbell-House Shipyard
- Architect: Edwin Monk
- NRHP reference No.: 04000658
- AHRS No.: PET-00528
- Added to NRHP: July 7, 2004

The Judith Ann is a riverboat that historically plied the Stikine River in southern Alaska and western British Columbia. Built in 1950, the wooden-hulled boat operated on the river between 1950 and 1970, was the last boat to offer scheduled service on the river, and is the only surviving service watercraft to ply the river. She operated between Wrangell, Alaska, and Telegraph Creek, British Columbia. She is now owned by the Stikine River Historical Foundation, and was listed on the National Register of Historic Places in 2004.

== See also ==
- National Register of Historic Places listings in Wrangell, Alaska
