= Blake Channel =

Alaskan channel

Coordinates: 56°18′40″N 131°59′20″W

Blake Channel is a channel in Southeast Alaska, United States. It extends 19.3 kilometres (12.0 mi), separating the southeastern part of Wrangell Island from the mainland. It was first traversed and charted in 1793 by James Johnstone, one of George Vancouver's officers during his 1791-95 expedition.
