= Wrangell High School =

High school in Alaska, United States

Coordinates: 56°28′19″N 132°22′41″W

Location
- 312 Reid St; Wrangell, Alaska 99929; United States

Information
- CEEB code: 020160
- Teaching staff: 6.25 (FTE)
- Enrollment: 71 (2024-2025)
- Student to teacher ratio: 11.36
- Mascot: Wolf

Wrangell High School is a public high school located in Wrangell, Alaska, United States. It is operated by Wrangell Public Schools.

The school has a cooperative agreement with the University of Alaska Southeast to help high school students acquire technical skills and college credits. The program began with construction techniques and woodworking, but has expanded.

Its basketball teams compete with other high school teams in the state. In March 2015, the "Wrangell Wolves" basketball team won fourth place in a statewide tournament, along with awards for the highest grade point averages (GPA) in the state as well as good sportsmanship. In December 2014, the Wrangell High School wrestling team won a southeast regional tournament for the first time in more than 20 years.

Behind the high school, a hiking trail named for John Muir begins. A 15-minute climb up that John Muir Trail goes through second-growth forest to an observation platform atop Mt. Dewey.
