= Petroglyph Beach State Historic Park =

State park in Alaska, United States

Coordinates: 58°18′04″N 134°24′47″W

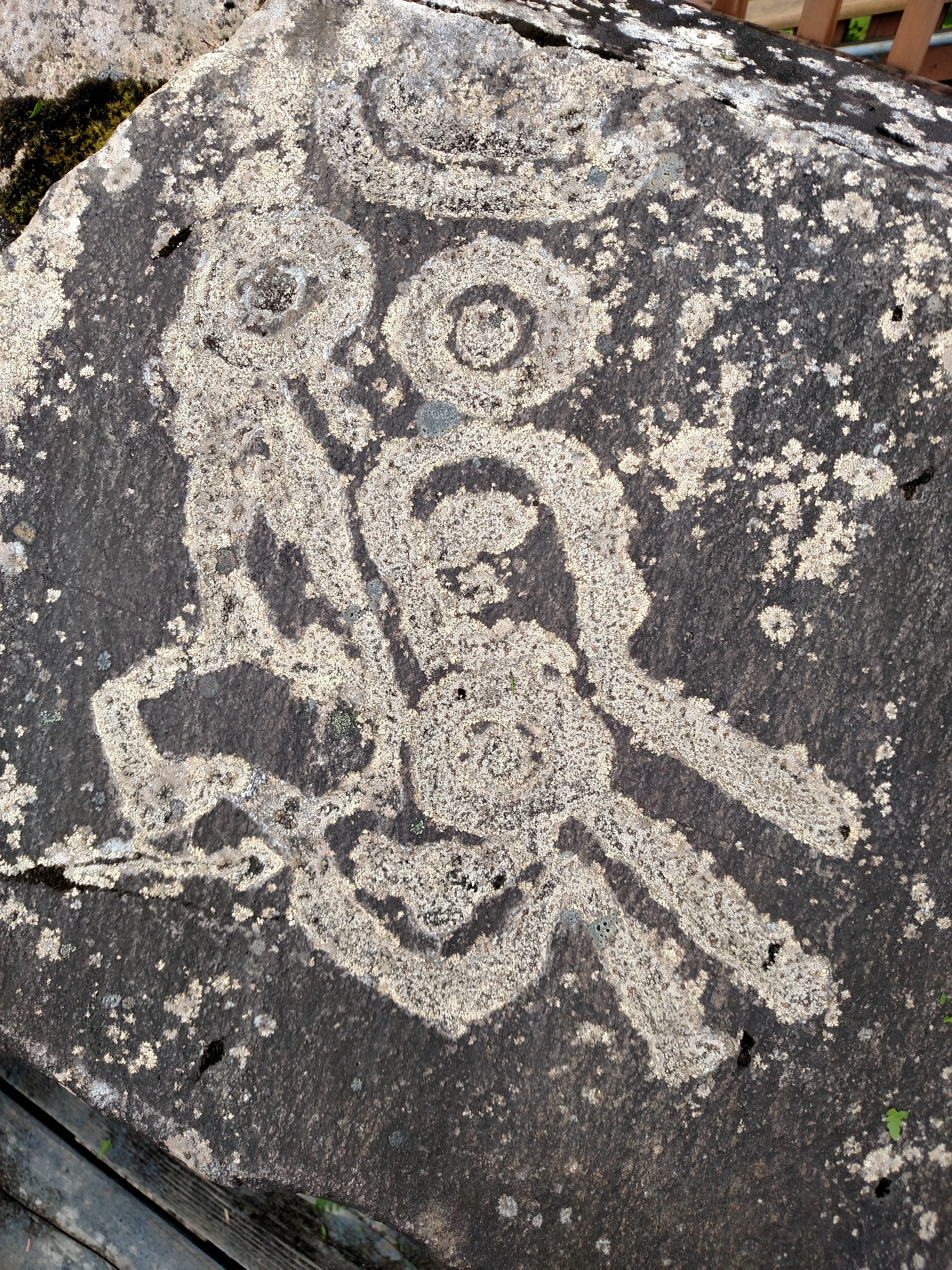
One of the many petroglyphs.

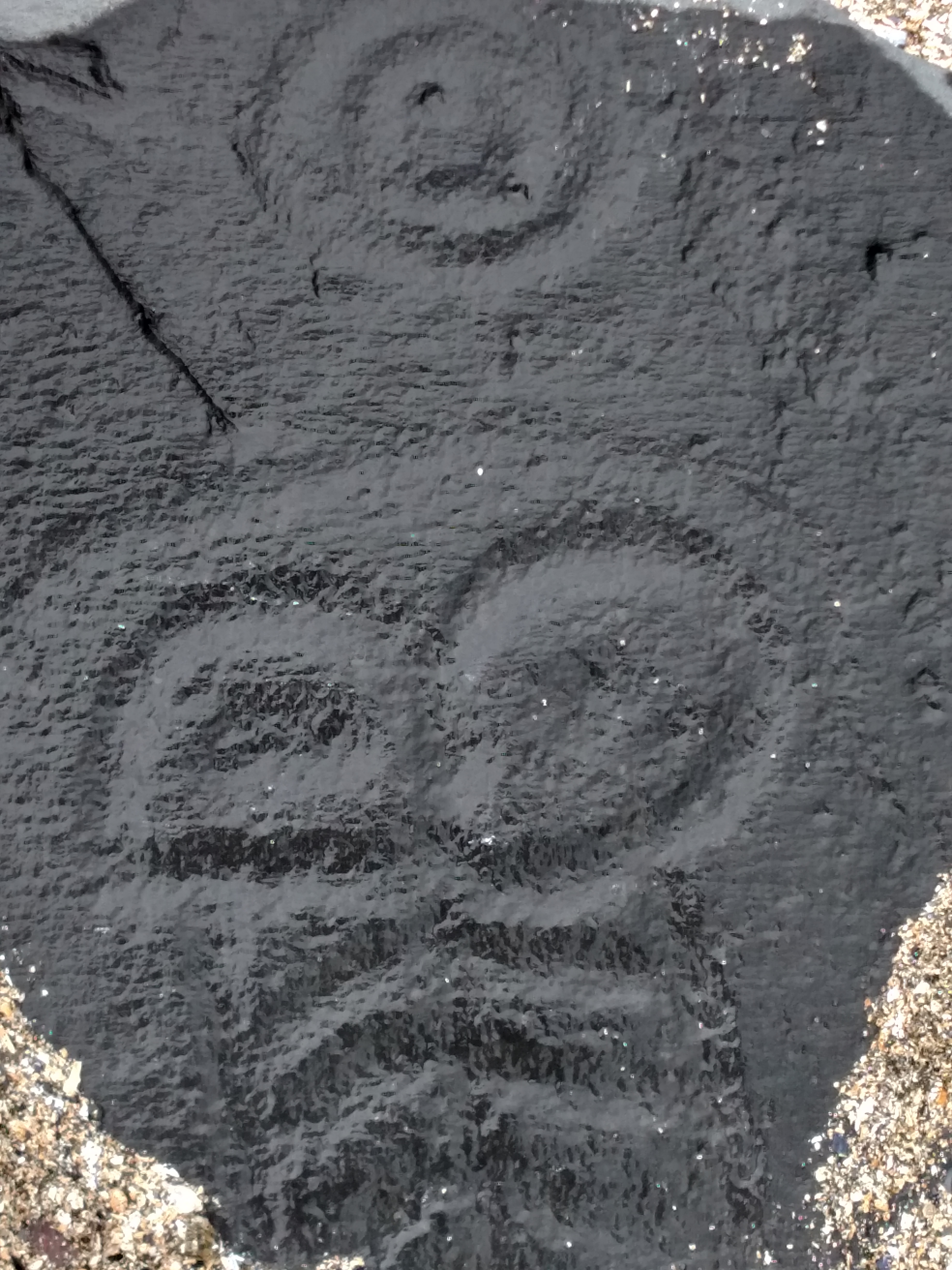

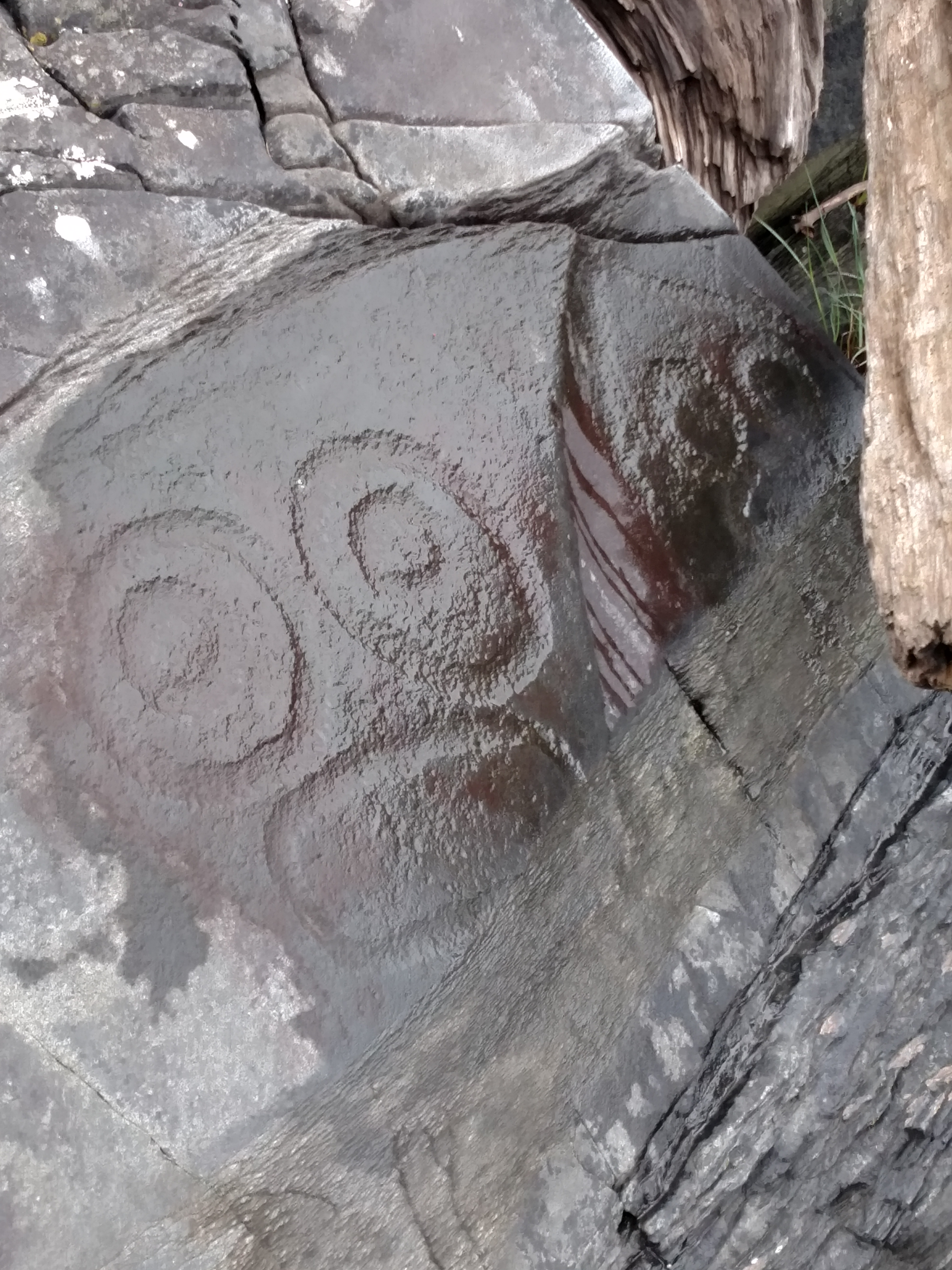

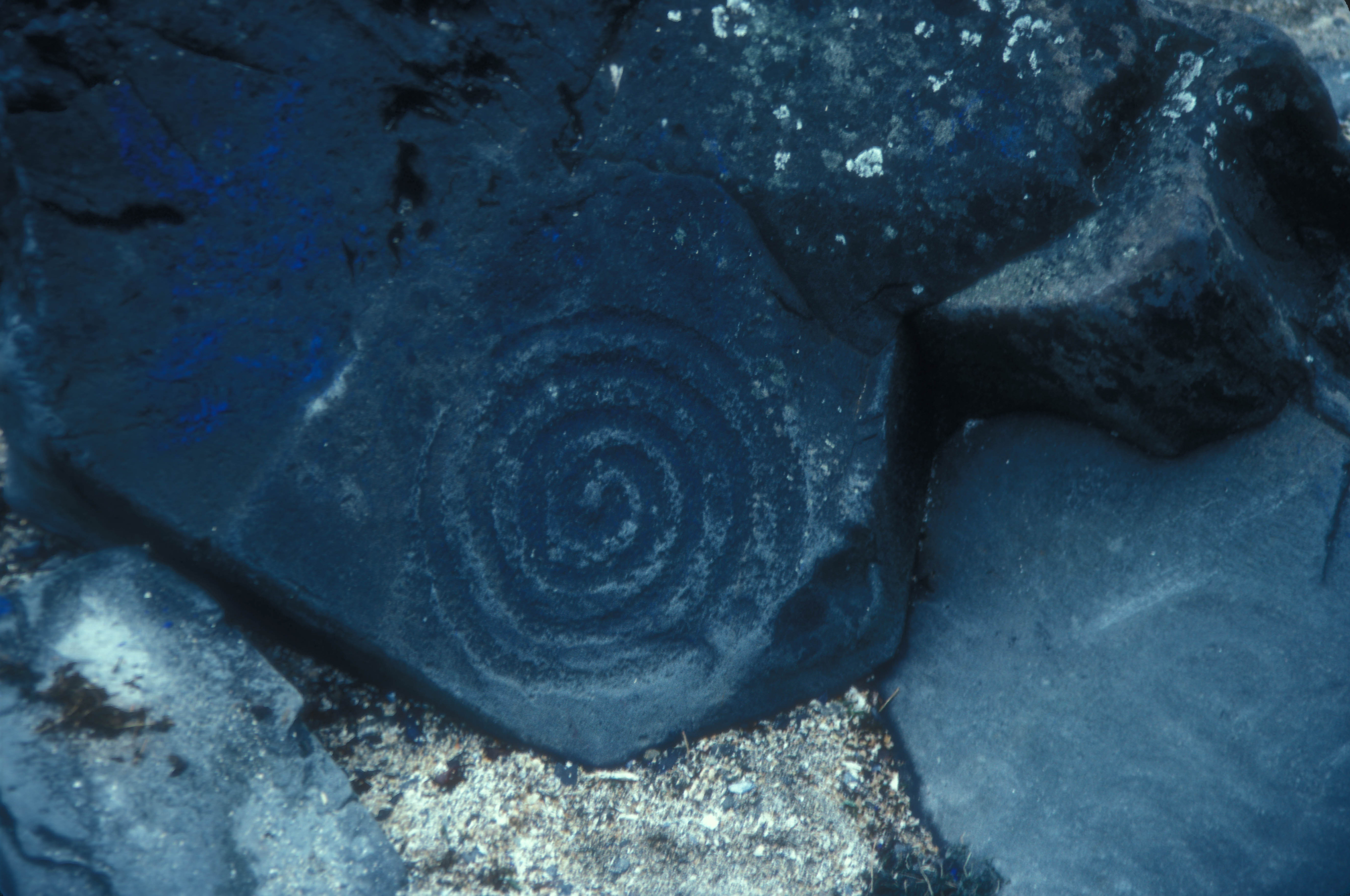
A petroglyph on the beach

Petroglyph Beach State Historic Site is an Alaskan beach and public historical site with the highest concentration of Native American petroglyphs in the southeastern region of Alaska. Located on the shore of Wrangell, Alaska barely a mile out of town, it became a State Historic Park in 2000. At least 40 petroglyphs have been found to date. The site itself is about 8000 years old.

The petroglyphs that remain here are found on the boulders and bedrock outcrops on the shore, just below and above mean high tide. It is thought that they were created by members of the Tlingit tribe and most of the petroglyphs can be found close to places of importance such as salmon streams and sites of habitation. They depict whales, salmon, and faces of the community. The rock here is metamorphic and tends to be a dark gray that is finely grained, moderately durable, and easy to fracture, which would make it easier to manipulate for petroglyphs. Here are some of the most concentrated petroglyphs in the world. Petroglyphs and associated site components are under the protection of federal laws and State of Alaska Antiquities Laws.

Petroglyphs may be a form of writing, a method of communication, or a way to record events and there are many interpretations of them including commemorating victories in war; documenting the transfer of wealth or territory in settlement of a feud; important potlatches; shamanistic exploits, etc. They may also have a religious significance as well; by using petroglyphs as a ritual device to ensure the success of the hunt and to increase the supply of game, but they may simply have no meaning beyond their artistic conception. Furthermore, petroglyphs are created by removing part of a rock surface by incising, pecking, carving or abrading. Unfortunately the petroglyphs are typically not used by professional archaeologists. They usually avoid petroglyphs because they are very difficult to date and any interpretation is usually unscientific and very speculative.
