= Wrangell Public Schools =

School district in Alaska, United States

Address
- 350 Bennett Street Wrangell, Alaska, 99929; United States

District information
- Type: Public
- Grades: PreK–12
- NCES District ID: 0200810

Students and staff
- Students: 264
- Teachers: 20.0
- Staff: 23.0
- Student–teacher ratio: 13.2

Other information
- Website: wpsd.us

Wrangell Public Schools is a school district headquartered in Wrangell, Alaska.

Schools:

- Evergreen Elementary School
- Stikine Middle School
- Wrangell High School
