= Stikine (disambiguation) =

Stikine, meaning "great river" in the Tlingit language, may refer to:

== Geography and locations ==
- Stikine River, a major river in British Columbia and Alaska
- Stikine Strait, a marine waterway in Alaska offshore from the mouth of the Stikine River, near Wrangell, Alaska
- Fort Stikine, a trading post and fortification of the Hudson's Bay Company at what is now Wrangell, Alaska
- Stikine Country, aka the Stikine District, a geographic region of the Canadian province of British Columbia, roughly equivalent to the Stikine Mining Division aka Stikine Mining District of the British Columbia Dept. of Mines
- Stikine Plateau, a large regional landform in northwestern British Columbia, inclusive of the Stikine and Taku River basins
- Stikine Ranges, a major subgrouping of the Cassiar Mountains of northern British Columbia
- Stikine, British Columbia, aka Boundary, an unincorporated locality and former customs post on the lower Stikine River
- Stikine River Provincial Park, a provincial park protecting the Grand Canyon of the Stikine River
- Stikine Hot Springs, a hot spring on the lower Stikine River protected by Choquette Hot Springs Provincial Park
- Stikine Volcanic Belt, a subgrouping of volcanoes within the Northern Cordilleran Volcanic Province in British Columbia
- Stikine Icecap, a large icefield in the Boundary Ranges of the Coast Mountains, spanning the British Columbia-Alaska border
- Stikine-LeConte Wilderness, a park in the Alaska Panhandle
- Tongass/Stikine National Forest, aka the Tongass National Forest, a US national forest in Alaska
- Klondike Gold Rush#Takou, Stikine and Edmonton routes

== Political units ==
- Stikine Territory, formally the Stickeen Territories, a former British overseas territory established in 1861, absorbed into the Colony of British Columbia in 1863
- Stikine Region, an administrative region of the Canadian province of British Columbia
- Regional District of Kitimat-Stikine, a regional district in northwestern British Columbia
- Stikine (provincial electoral district), a provincial electoral district in northwestern British Columbia

== People ==
- Stikine people (Shtaxʼhéen Ḵwáan), a ḵwáan or regional group of the Tlingit
