= Zimovia Strait =

Coordinates: 56°13′03″N 132°19′42″W

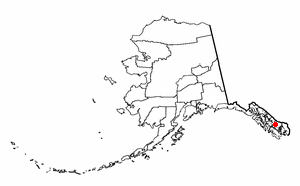
Location of Wrangell, Alaska

Zimovia Strait is a narrow strait in the Alexander Archipelago in the U.S. state of Alaska. It is about 100 km (62 mi) long and bounded by Wrangell Island to the east and Woronkofski and Etolin Islands to the west. The strait is shown in an 1844 Russian chart, but the name was first published in 1853 on a Russian Hydrographic Department chart as "Proliv Zimov'ya" (English: Winter Strait).
