= South Etolin Wilderness =

Wilderness area in Alaska, United States

Coordinates: 56.01°N 132.30°W

The South Etolin Wilderness is a wilderness area within the Tongass National Forest of Alaska. The designated wilderness encompasses 82,676 acres, including much of Etolin Island along with several smaller islands, all of which are part of the Alexander Archipelago. Designated in 1990 by the Tongass Timber Reform Act, the wilderness protects classic Southeast Alaska temperate rainforest ecosystems, rising from the densely forested coast to the glacially carved summit of 3,720-foot Mount Etolin. An introduced population of Roosevelt elk provides a unique hunting opportunity, both for sport and subsistence purposes.
