= Wrangell Island =

Island in Wrangell City and Borough, Alaska, United States

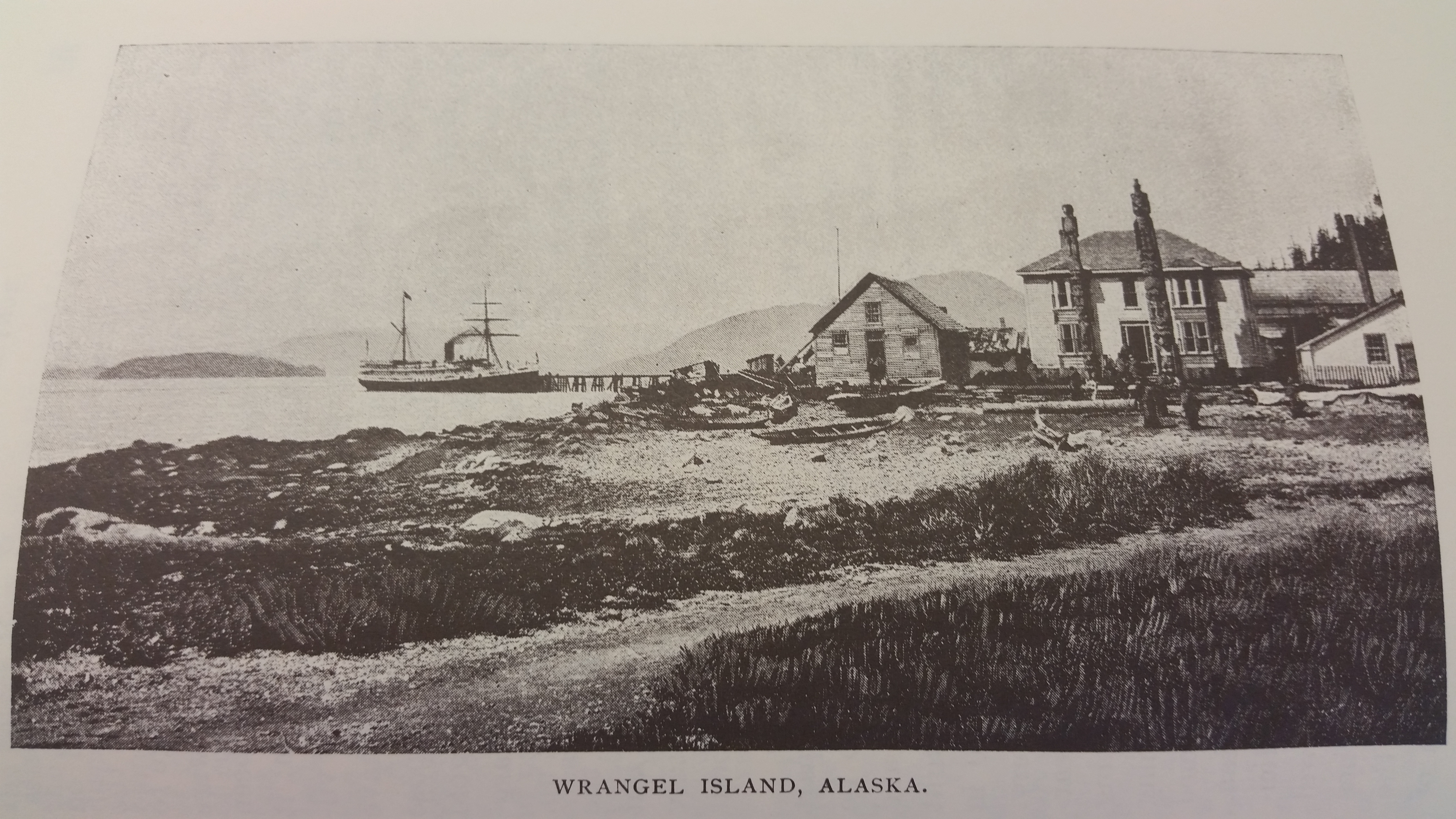
- Wrangell Island, Alaska

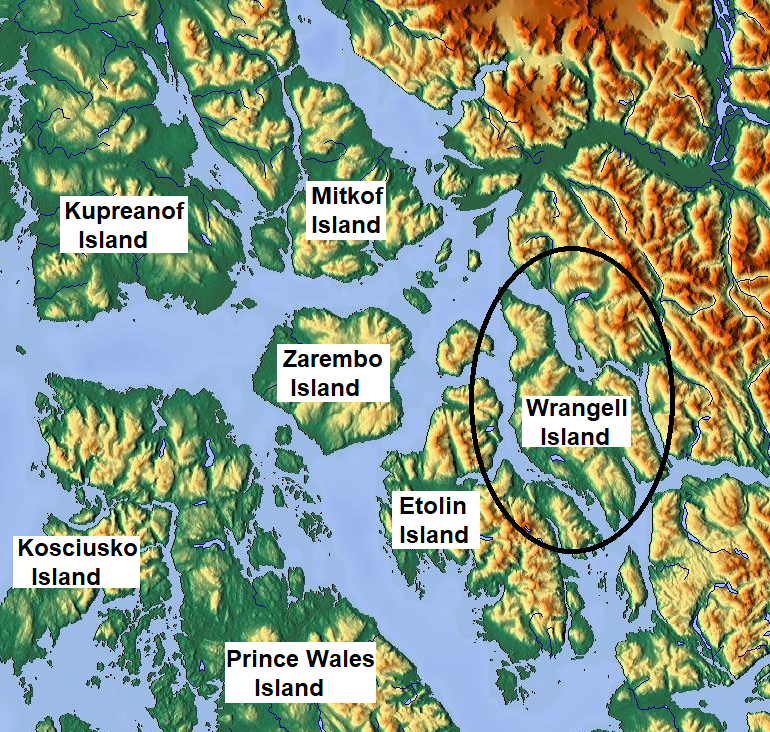

- Location within Alaska

Geography
- Location: Alaska Panhandle
- Coordinates: 56°17′51″N 132°10′30″W
- Archipelago: Alexander Archipelago
- Area: 210.05 sq mi (544.0 km^{2})
- Length: 28.5 mi (45.9 km)
- Width: 3.75–14.2 mi (6.04–22.85 km)

Administration
- United States
- State: Alaska
- Borough: Wrangell
- Largest settlement: Wrangell

Demographics
- Population: 2,009 (2020 census)

Wrangell Island (Russian: Остров Врангеля) is an island in the Alexander Archipelago in the Alaska Panhandle of southeastern Alaska. It is 28.5 miles (45.9 kilometres) long and 3.75 to 14.2 miles (6.04–22.85 kilometres) wide. It has a land area of 210.05 square miles (544.03 square kilometres), making it the 29th largest island in the United States. Wrangell is separated from the mainland by the narrow Blake Channel.

== History ==
The first European to sight the island was James Johnstone, one of George Vancouver’s officers during his 1791-1795 expedition, in 1793. He only charted its east coast, not realizing it was an island.

The island was occupied in 1834 by the Russians.

It is named after Ferdinand von Wrangel, a Baltic German explorer in Russian naval service, and a Russian government official. He was appointed chief manager of the Russian-American Company in 1829, effectively the first married governor of its settlements in North America (present day Alaska). Wrangel cultivated potatoes on the island, started mines, laid out roads, built bridges and government buildings and recorded geographical and ethnographical observations in a report to the navy, in his years as governor, 1829 to 1835.

After the U.S. purchased Alaska from Russia, from 1867 to 1877, it was a U.S. military post. Later, it became an outfitting point for hunters and explorers, and for miners using the Stikine River route to the Yukon.

The island contains the city of Wrangell, Alaska. Wrangell Island is heavily forested and contains an abundance of wildlife. The only other community is Thoms Place on the southwest side, across the Zimovia Strait from Etolin Island.

Fishing and mining are pursued in the area. A lumber mill closed in the 1990s. The island and surrounding areas contain many recreational areas. It is at the mouth of the Stikine River, which provides many recreational opportunities.

== Population ==
Wrangell Island's total population was 2,127 at the 2020 census, reported as Wrangell City and Borough.
