= Stikine-LeConte Wilderness =

Protected area in Alaska, United States

Coordinates: 56°50′00″N 132°19′30″W

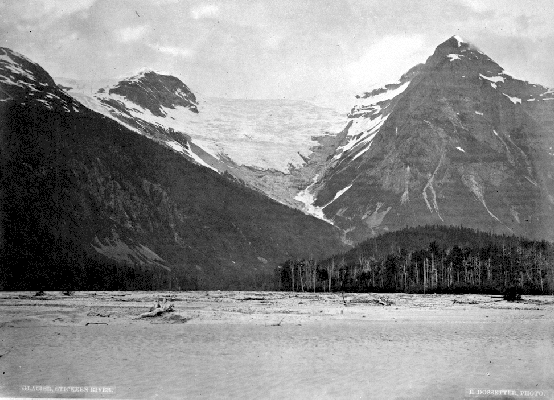
The Stikine River

The Stikine-LeConte Wilderness is on the mainland of southeast Alaska, southeast of Petersburg and north of Wrangell, Alaska. The boundary extends from Frederick Sound on the west to the Alaska–Canada boundary on the east. The wilderness is 448,841 acres (181,640 ha) in size. It is part of Tongass National Forest, which is managed by the United States Forest Service.

== Description ==
One of the major features of this area is the Stikine River, which flows through the southern portion of the Stikine-LeConte Wilderness. The river valley is relatively narrow. The surrounding mountains are steep, rugged, and contain numerous glaciers. Meltwater from these glaciers has a high silt content, giving the Stikine River a milky appearance. The river delta is highly braided with three main navigable channels. Two warm and one hot springs are found along the river. North of the Stikine River area is the LeConte Glacier, which flows into LeConte Bay. LeConte Glacier is the southernmost glacier in North America that flows directly into salt water. Mountains in the area of LeConte Bay are steep and most of the upper valleys are glacier-filled. Glaciers and ice fields cover most of the rugged, mountainous area in the eastern part of the Stikine-LeConte Wilderness.

Alpine vegetation, including mosses, lichens, and other small plants, is found at the upper elevations. The lower mountain slopes near salt water support a dense spruce-hemlock rainforest. Closer to the Canada–US border, the rain decreases and the vegetation changes to stands of cottonwood. Cottonwood are also common on the many islands of the Stikine. The valley floor along the river is a combination of muskegs and dense alder and willow thickets. The Stikine River delta is approximately 17 miles (27 km) wide and consists of grass flats, tidal marsh, and sand bars.

Much of the area, particularly the Stikine River drainage, is recognized as an important fish and wildlife area. Moose, mountain goats, brown bear and black bear, deer, and wolves inhabit the area. The delta flats of the Stikine River are a major resting and nesting area for migratory birds. A variety of fish, including king and other species of salmon, are found in the waters of the area. Up to 2000 eagles congregate in the mouth of the river, following a run of smelt.
