= Wrangell, Alaska =

Consolidated city-borough in Alaska, United States

Wrangell, Alaska Ḵaachx̱ana.áakʼw (Tlingit) Врангель (Russian)
- Unified Borough
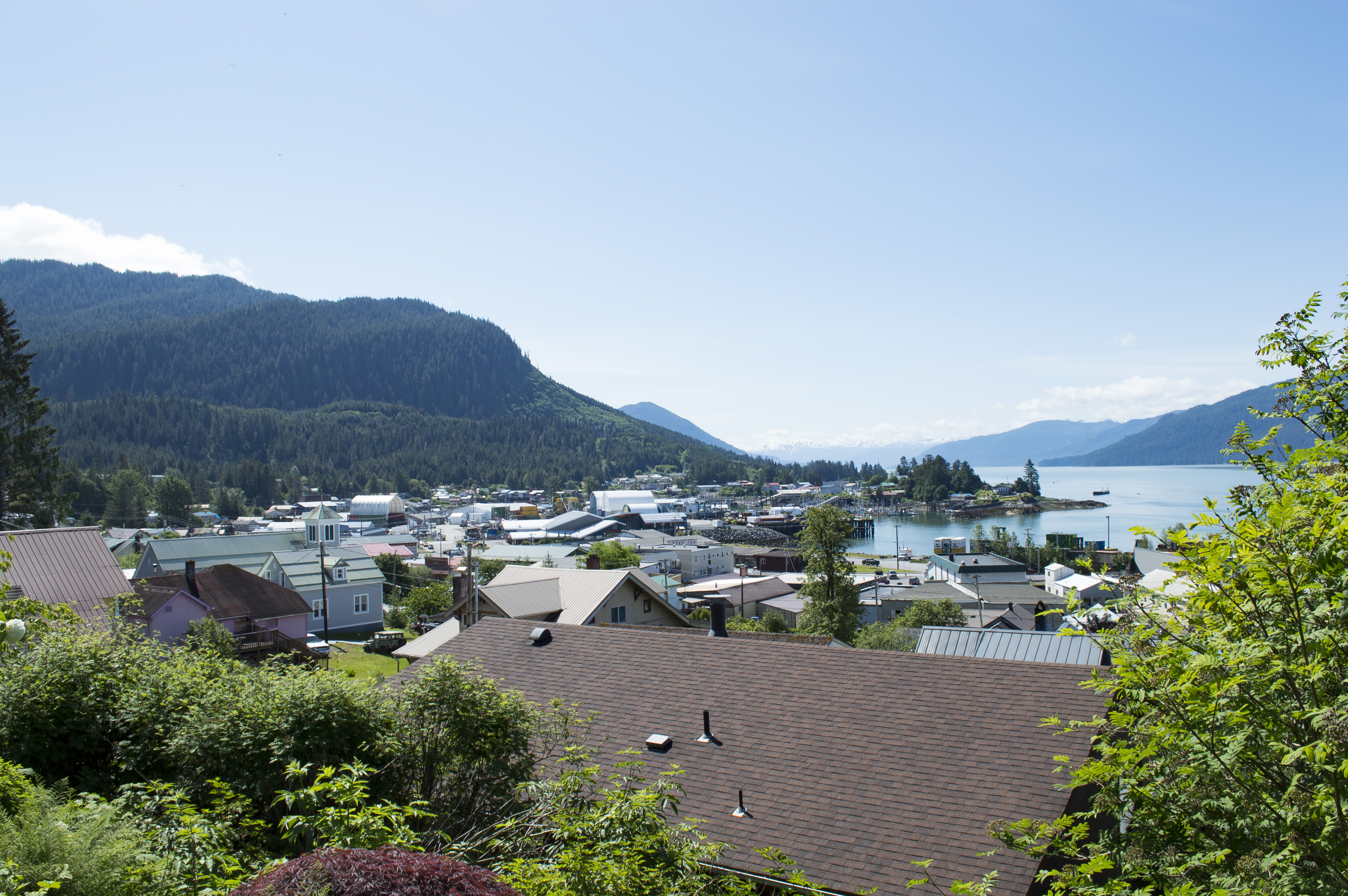
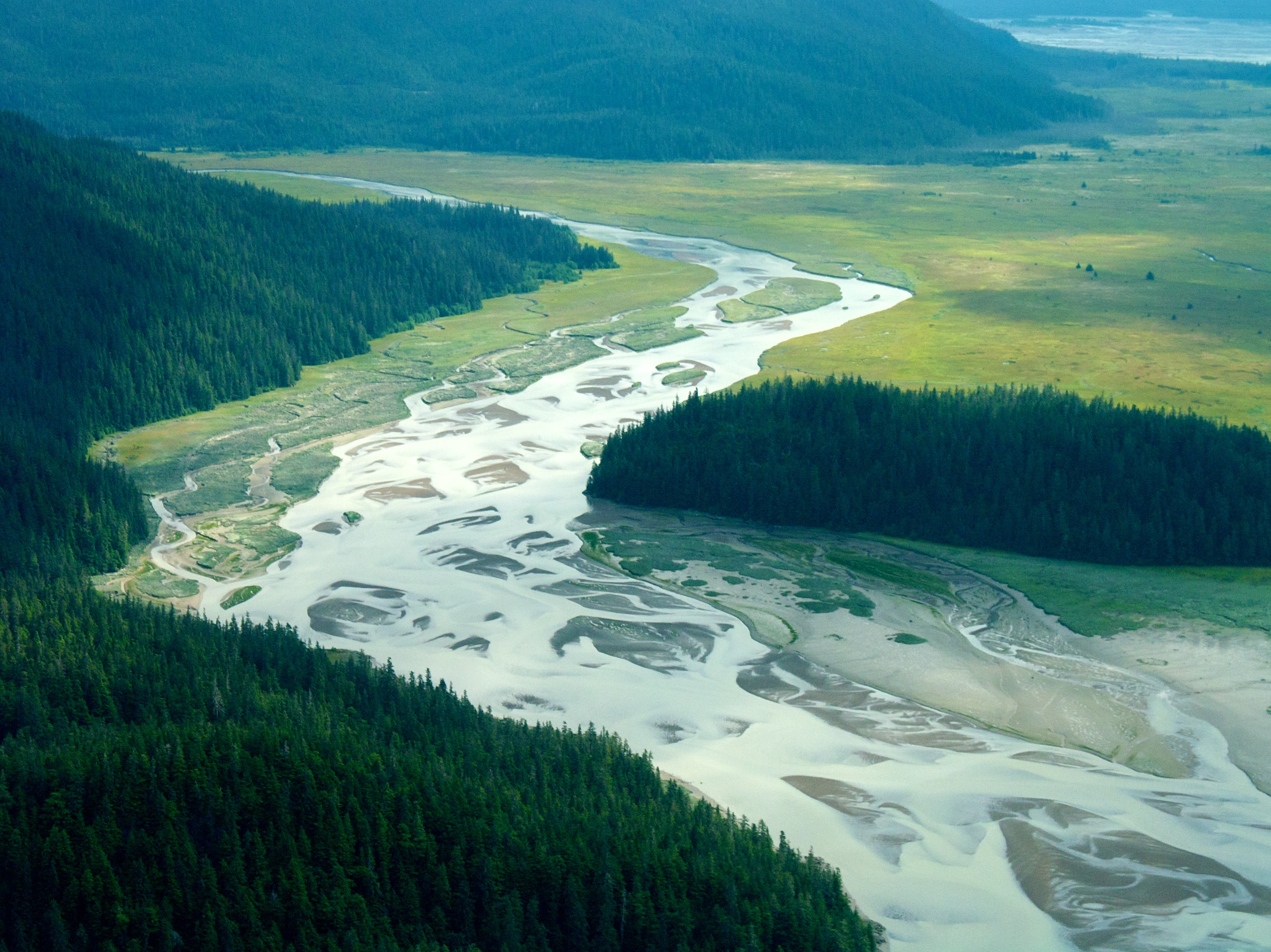
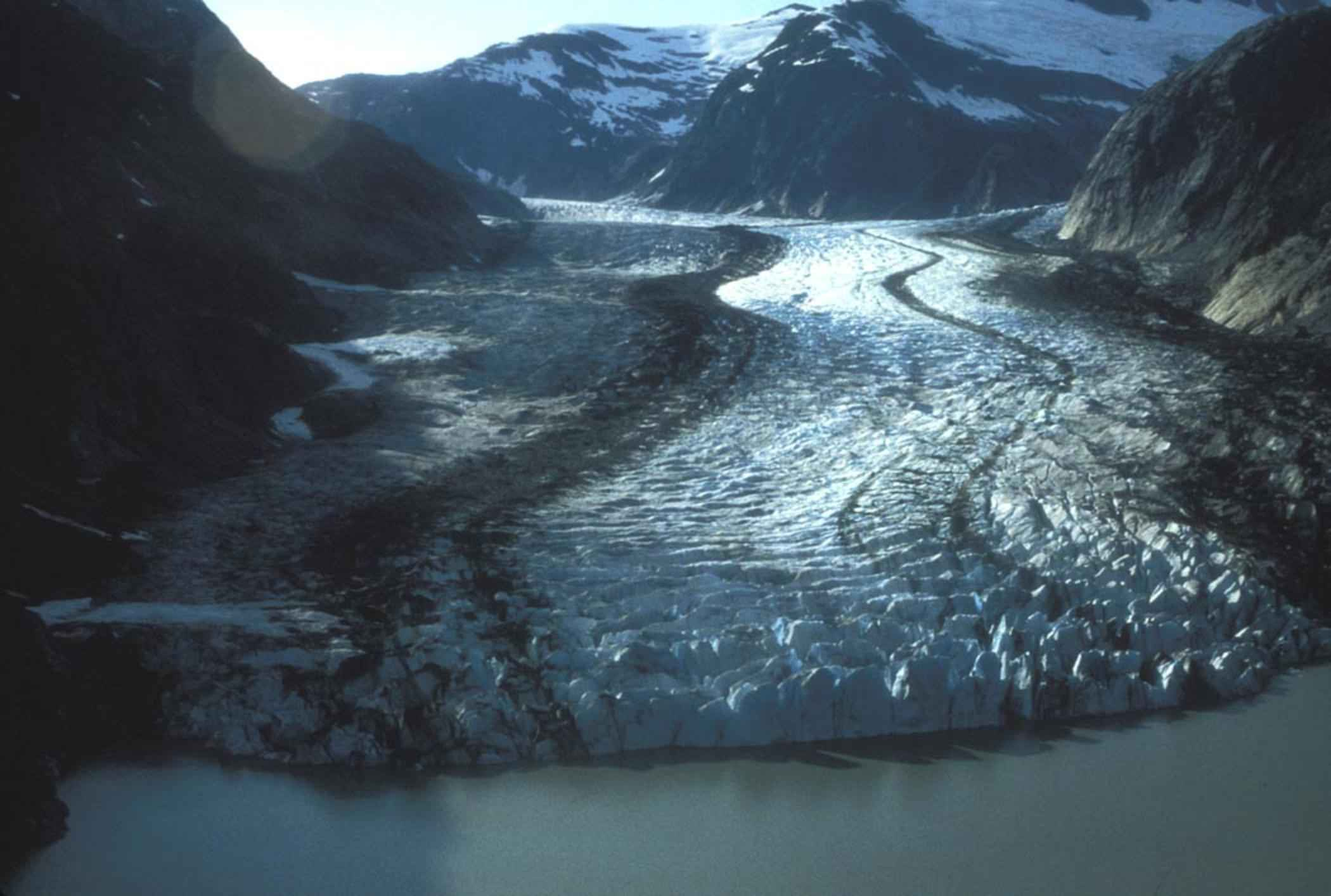
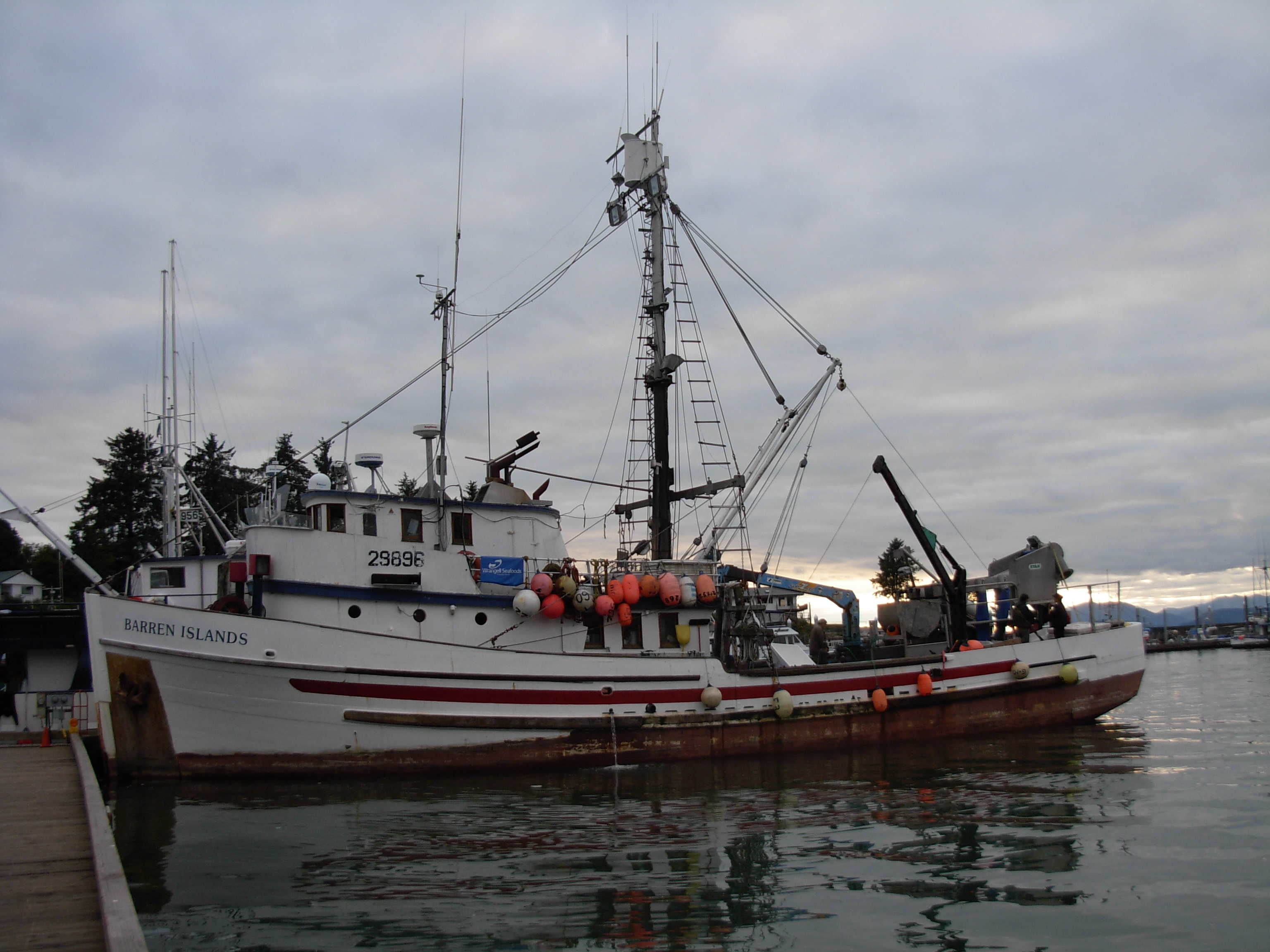
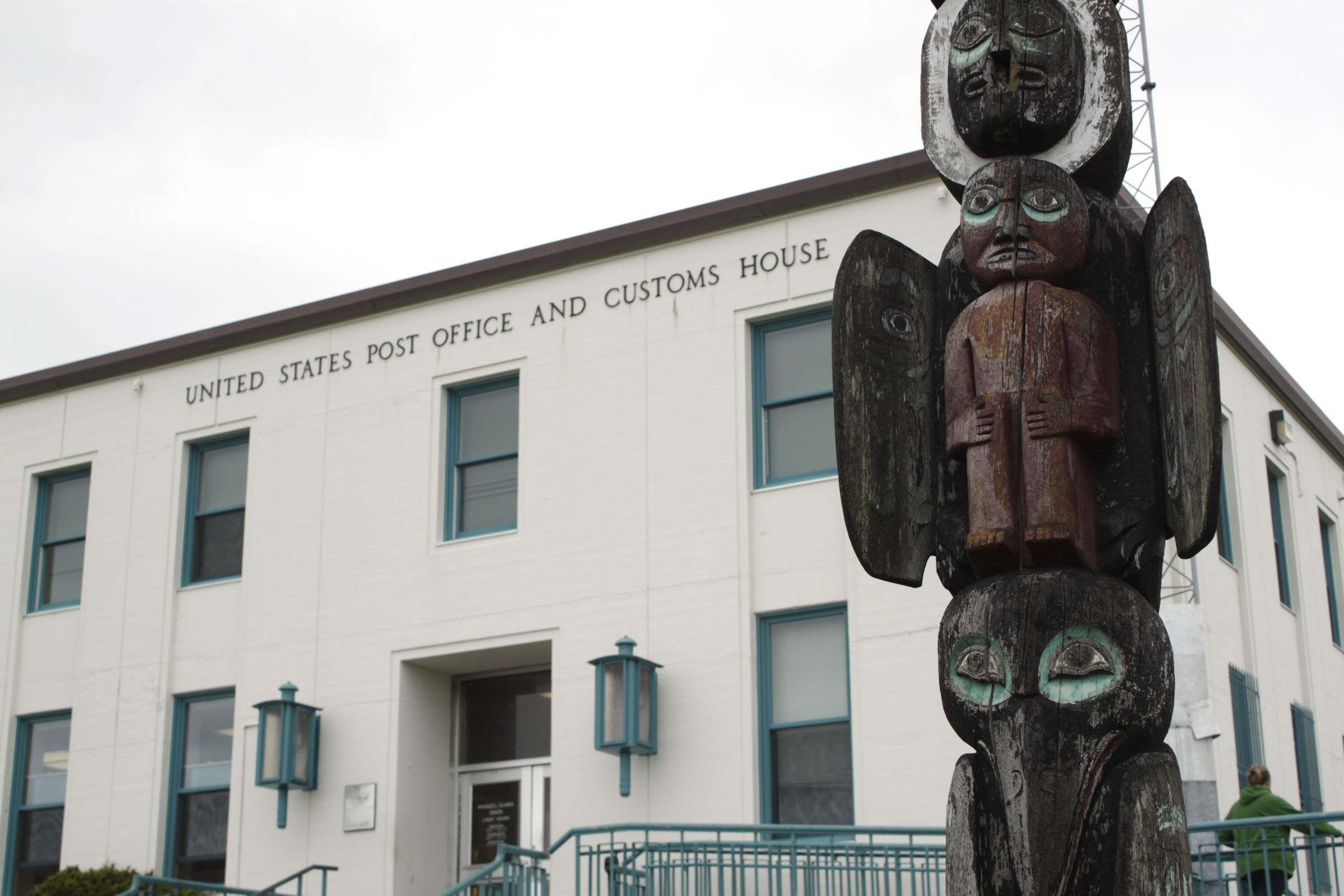
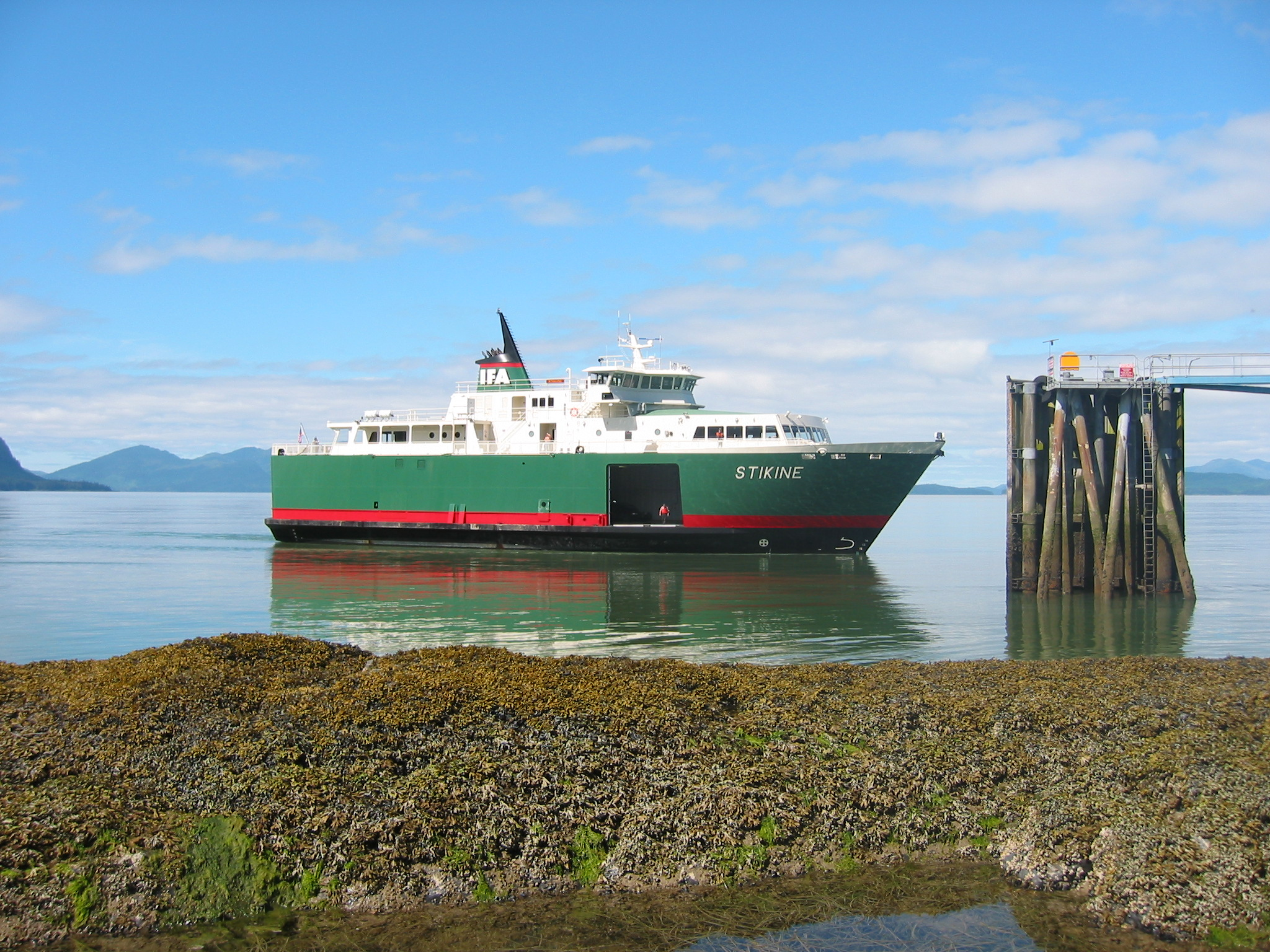
- View of the city in 2016 Stikine River delta Shakes Glacier in the Stikine-LeConte Wilderness Fishing boat docked at harbor Post Office and Customs House Ferry M/V Stikine arriving

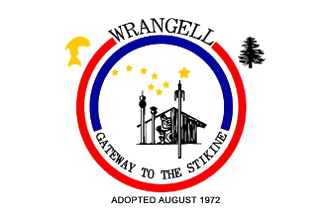
- Flag Seal

- Location of Wrangell within Alaska Wrangell, Alaska (North America)
- Coordinates: 56°23′06″N 132°05′11″W
- Country: United States
- State: Alaska
- Founded: 1834
- English: 1839
- American: 1867
- Incorporated: 1903 (as a city); May 30, 2008 (as a borough)
- Named for: Ferdinand von Wrangel

Government
  - Mayor: Patricia Gilbert

Area
  - Unified Borough: 3,476.61 sq mi (9,004.37 km^{2})
  - Land: 2,556.00 sq mi (6,620.00 km^{2})
  - Water: 920.61 sq mi (2,384.38 km^{2})
  - Urban: 71 sq mi (180 km^{2})
- Elevation: 69 ft (21 m)

Population (2020)
  - Unified Borough: 2,127
  - Estimate (2025): 2,007 ▼
  - Density: 0.83/sq mi (0.32/km^{2})
- Time zone: UTC-9 (AKST)
  - Summer (DST): UTC-8 (AKDT)
- ZIP code: 99929
- Area code: 907
- FIPS codes: 02-275, 02-86380
- GNIS feature IDs: 1415843, 2418874
- Website: wrangell.com

Wrangell (Tlingit: Ḵaachx̱ana.áakʼw, Russian: Врангель, romanized: Vrangel') is a borough in Alaska, United States. As of the 2020 census the population was around 2,127, down from 2,369 in 2010.

Incorporated as a Unified Home Rule Borough on May 30, 2008, Wrangell was previously a city in the Wrangell-Petersburg Census Area, which was afterwards renamed the Petersburg Census Area (the Petersburg Borough was formed from part of this census area). Its Tlingit name is Ḵaachx̱ana.áakʼw ("Ḵaachx̱ans Little Lake" with áa-kʼw 'lake-diminutive'). The Tlingit people living in the Wrangell area, who were there centuries before Europeans, call themselves the Shtaxʼhéen Ḵwáan after the nearby Stikine River. Alternately they use the autonym Shxʼát Ḵwáan, where the meaning of shxʼát is unknown. They are enrolled in the Wrangell Cooperative Association, a federally recognized tribe.

The central (urban) part of Wrangell is located at 56°28′15″N 132°22′36″W, in the northwest corner of Wrangell Island. The borough also encompasses the entire eastern half of the former Wrangell-Petersburg Census Area, in addition to the area around Meyers Chuck, which was formerly in the Prince of Wales-Outer Ketchikan Census Area. It includes Thoms Place, a former census-designated place on Wrangell Island.

== History ==
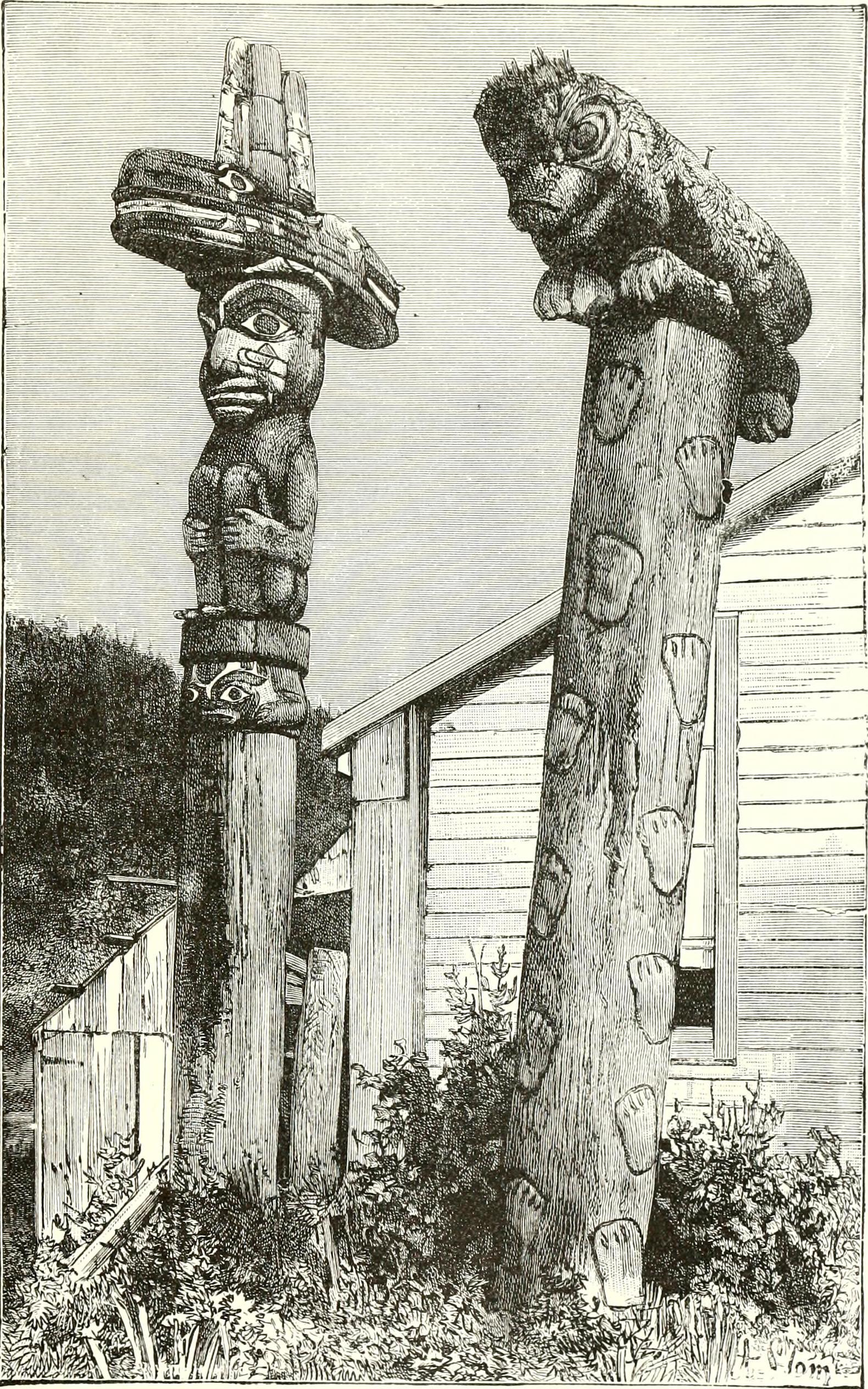
Totem poles in Wrangell

Tlingit people and their ancestors have inhabited this island for thousands of years. According to Naanyaa.aayí clan traditions, Tlingit people migrated down the Stikine River during a time when the river still flowed underneath glaciers. The population slowly moved down the river, settling in different locations such as Tlákw.aan "Ancient Village", Sʼiknáx̱ "Across from the Grass", Shaal.aan "Fish Trap Town", Xakw.aan "Sandbar Village", and Kayáash "Platform", Hehl (Xel/Xehl) "Foam People", Hehl being the senior of house of the village.

Later settlements on the coast included Chʼuxʼáasʼaan "Waterfall Town" (now Mill Creek), Ḵeishangita.aan "Red Alder Head Village" (site of the Wrangell Institute at Shoemaker Bay), Kʼaatsʼḵu Noow "Among the Sharps Fort" (now Anita Bay), An.áan "Village that Rests" (now Anan Bear Viewing Area), and many others. The numerous petroglyphs found at Petroglyph Beach just north of Wrangell, as well as those scattered on the beaches of the many islands in the vicinity, attest to the long Tlingit presence.

It is known that the first peoples' coastal migration to the Stikine River came from the south. The Nass River people had several migrations into the area. The "Kiks.ádi" people tell of their migration story in a totem raised in Wrangell in 1894 called "Kiks.ádi" Totem.

The saltwater inlet now known as Wrangell Harbor was traditionally called Ḵaachx̱ana.áakʼw, literally "Ḵaachx̱án's little lake". Before the harbor mouth was dredged and cleared in the late 19th century, the mouth of this inlet would often go dry at low tide, which led to its being called a lake.

Ḵaachx̱án was a man from the village variously known as Ḵaalchʼalʼaan (Kotzlitzan) or Chʼaalʼít.aan, meaning "Willow House Village"; or Shaax̱ít.aan meaning "Driftwood House Village." The village site today is known as "Old Town" or "Old Wrangell" (located at 56°12′28″N 132°16′22″W). (Note: NOAA Nautical Chart 17385) Ḵaachx̱án was supposedly a hermit who preferred living away from his relatives, and thus lived in a smokehouse located on the rear shore of the lake named after him.

=== 19th century ===
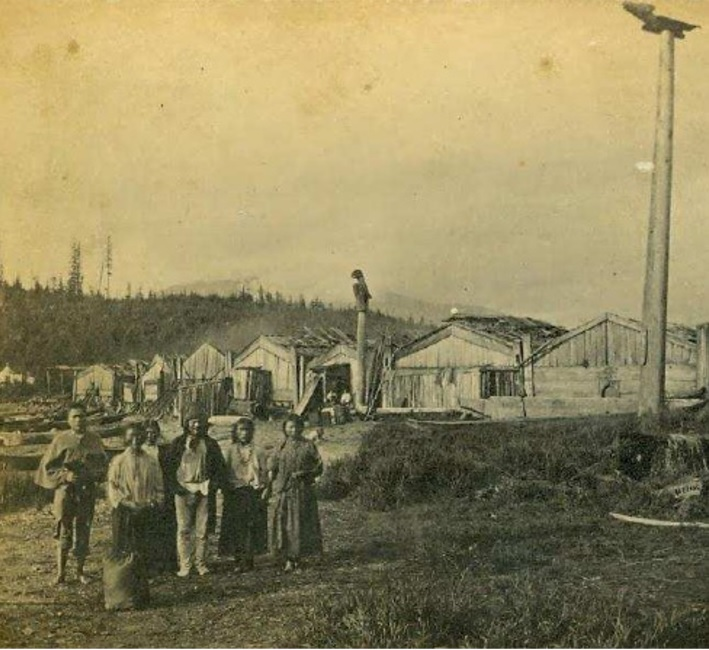
Village of Wrangell (Tlingit: Ḵaachx̱ana.áakʼw) in 1868, present-day Front Street

Wrangell was founded by Russians as one of the oldest non-Native settlements in Alaska. They started trading for furs with area Tlingit in 1811 at the site of present-day Wrangell. In 1834, Baron Ferdinand Friedrich Wrangel, then head of Russian government interests in Russian America, ordered a stockade built near the Naanyaa.aayí clan house of Chief Shakes, called Shéiksh Hídi. This house was located about 18 miles (29 km) north of Old Wrangell, on a small island in the middle of what is today Wrangell Harbor. The stockade, named Redoubt Saint Dionysius (Редутъ Санктъ Дионисіусъ), was founded at the location of present-day Wrangell and stood near the end of the small peninsula that forms the northeastern side of the mouth of the harbor.

The British Hudson's Bay Company (HBC) leased the fort in 1839 and named the stockade Fort Stikine. The Tlingit had used the Stikine River as a trade route to the interior since ancient times, and they protested when the Hudson's Bay Company began to use their trade routes. Two epidemics of smallpox in 1836 and 1840 reduced the Tlingit population in the area by half, as they had no acquired immunity, and silenced most of the protest.

The HBC abandoned the fort in 1849 after the area's stocks of sea otter and beaver were depleted, thus ending the fur trade. Fort Stikine remained under British rule until Alaska's purchase by the United States in 1867. In 1868, the U.S. built a military post called Fort Wrangell at the site, and it remained active until 1877. The community around the post continued to grow through commerce with prospectors in the gold rushes of 1861, 1874–77, and 1897. As in Skagway, businessmen looking to make money off the miners built many gambling halls, dance halls, and bars. Thousands of miners traveled up the Stikine River into the Cassiar District of British Columbia during 1874, and again to the Klondike in 1897.

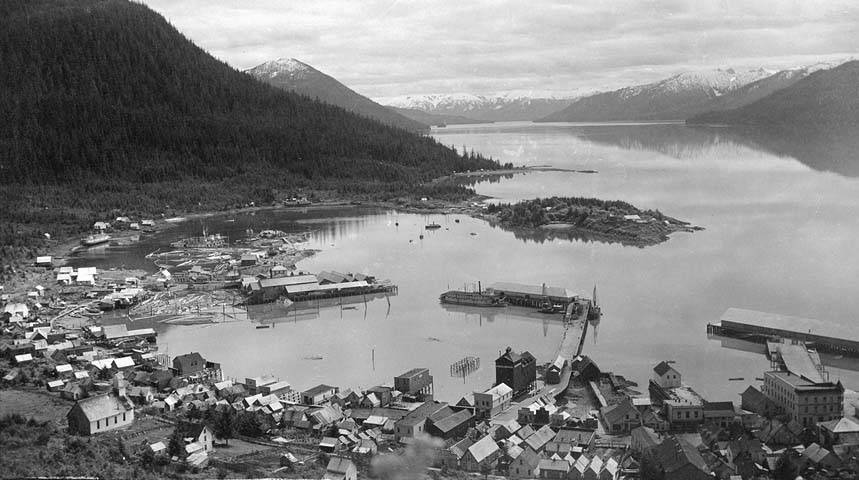
Bird's eye view, 1897

The Wrangell Bombardment occurred on December 25, 1869, when a Stikine Indian named Lowan bit off Mrs. Jaboc Muller's third right finger and was killed in an ensuing fight by soldiers who mortally wounded an additional Stikine Indian. The following morning, Shx'atoo (Scutd-doo), who was the father of the deceased, entered the fort and shot the post trader's partner Leon Smith fourteen times. Smith died about 13 hours later. The US army made an ultimatum demanding Sccutd-doo's surrender, and following bombardment of the Stikine Indian village, the villagers handed Shx'atoo (Scutd-doo) over to the military in the fort, where he was court-martialed and publicly hanged before the garrison and assembled natives on December 29, stating before he was hanged that he had acted in revenge against the occupants of the fort for the killing of Lowan and not against Smith in particular.

In 1877, the first Presbyterian church in Alaska, the first Protestant church of any kind in the area, was founded near its current location at 220 Church Street. Reverend S. Hall Young, a colleague of Sheldon Jackson, was assigned to the Wrangell mission and arrived on July 10, 1878. He worked among both miners and Tlingits. He established the Fort Wrangell Tlingit Industrial School to teach young Tlingit men various American trades, such as printing, boatbuilding, and construction. This institution was a parallel to Sheldon Jackson's Sitka Industrial Training School, which became Sheldon Jackson College. Young's school was the nucleus of the later Wrangell Institute, a boarding school for Alaska Natives through the mid-20th century.

S. Hall Young was a friend and companion of the naturalist John Muir, who lived in Wrangell in 1879–1880. Muir and Young traveled up the Stikine River, as well as to Kake, Glacier Bay, and elsewhere in Southeast Alaska. Young and Muir were accompanied by two Stikine elite men, Tʼaawyaat ("Toyatte", lit. Long Feather), and Kaadaashaan ("Kadachan"), as well Sitka Charley, as a young man who was their interpreter in Chinook Jargon and English.

In his final book, Travels in Alaska, John Muir describes how, in June 1890−ten years after his first visit to Wrangell−he returned on a Pacific Coast Steamship Company cruise out of Portland with 180 other passengers to find that the town was now the hub of a thriving and rather tacky tourist industry.

We arrived at Wrangell in the rain at 10:30 p.m. There was a grand rush on shore to buy curiosities and see totem poles. The shops were jammed and mobbed, high prices paid for shabby stuff manufactured expressly for tourist trade. Silver braclets hammered out of dollars and half dollars by Indian smiths are the most popular articles, then baskets, yellow cedar toy canoes, paddles, etc. Most people who travel look only at what they are directed to look at. Great is the power of the guidebook-maker, however ignorant.

The oldest Catholic Church in Alaska, St. Rose of Lima, was established at Wrangell on May 4, 1879.

Having been Tlingit territory and then under the jurisdiction of Russia, Great Britain, and the United States, Wrangell has the unique status as the only Alaskan city to have been governed under four "flags".

=== 20th century ===
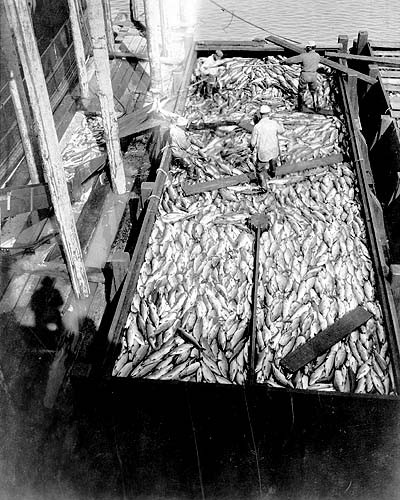
Scow loaded with salmon at the Alaska Packers Association cannery in Wrangell, 1918

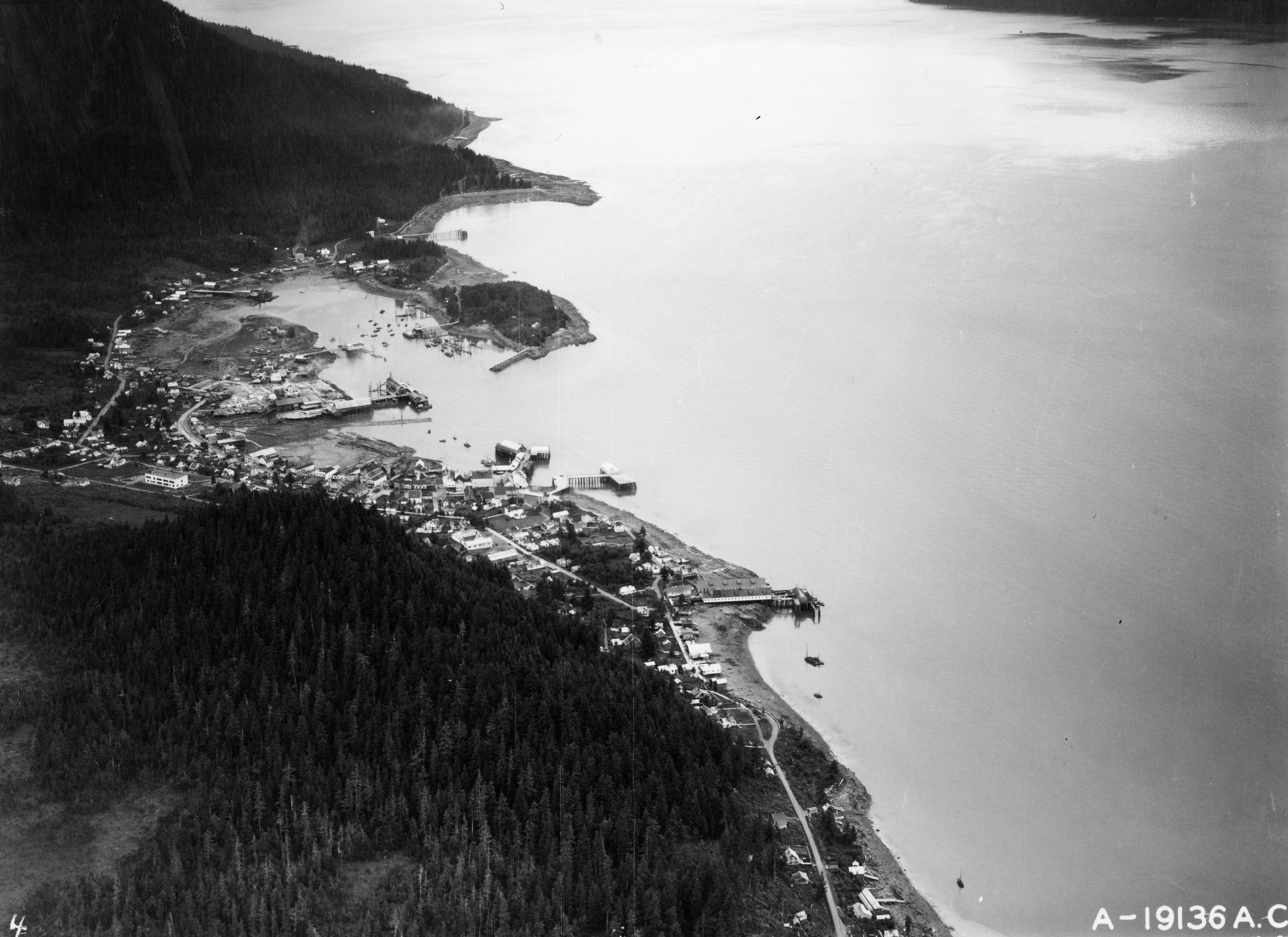
Wrangell, 1940s

Fish traps were constructed in the late 1890s on the nearby mouth of the Stikine River and in the Zimovia Strait. These contributed to the growth of the fishing and fish canning industries in Wrangell, which provided much of the economic life for the town before the rise of logging in the 1950s. The fish traps caused severe damage to the Stikine River salmon runs, reducing the number of fish that managed to spawn and causing a decline in salmon runs and fishing in the region. After statehood, the new government decommissioned all fish traps in Alaska. The fishing industry remained strong, and continues to be the primary occupation of many residents.

The weekly newspaper, The Wrangell Sentinel, was founded in 1902 and printed its first issue on November 2 of the same year. The newspaper remains in publication with only a few short periods of inactivity. It is the oldest continuously published newspaper in Alaska.

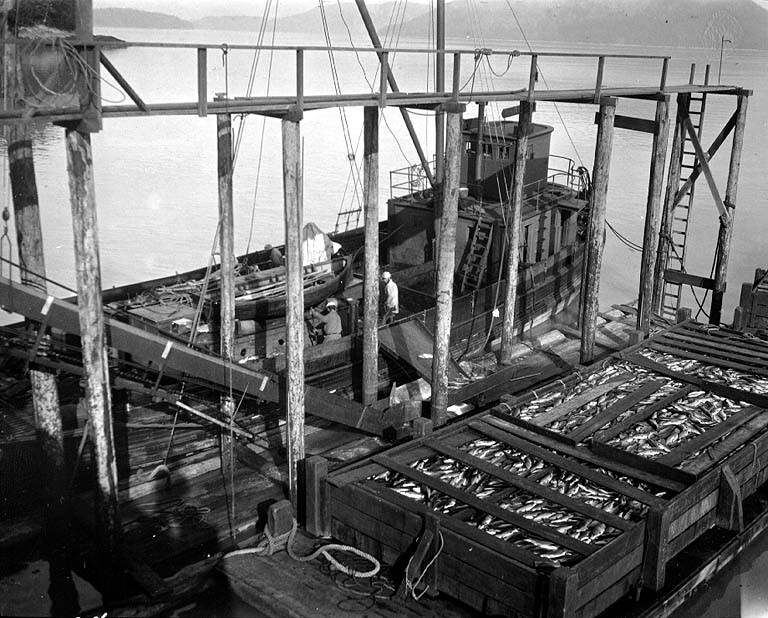
Scow with salmon is unloaded at a cannery's dock in Wrangell, 1918

The renowned Bear Totem Store, built in the 1920s by Walter Waters, housed innumerable examples of Tlingit arts and crafts, as well as a number of irreplaceable totem poles. Waters began his business career carrying mail by boat from Wrangell to Sulzer. During this period, he traveled throughout southeast Alaska as a fur buyer. While on business travels, Waters began to acquire Indian artifacts and make valuable contacts with Indian artisans. This eventually enabled him to open his curio shop, The Bear Totem Store. A severe fire in the early 1950s burned much of the downtown area, destroying the Bear Totem Store and most of its contents. Few historic buildings remained after the fire. The disaster dramatically changed the face of Wrangell, and with new buildings the past was lost.

Logging, fishing and tourism are the current mainstays of the Wrangell area economy. One of the last two major sawmills in Southeast Alaska is operated by the Silver Bay Logging Company just south of the city proper.

The community has always been a center of the Tlingit Kaach.àdi, Kiks.ádi and Naanyaa.aayí clans and the only home of the Kayaashkiditaan, Sʼiknax̱.ádi, X̱ookʼeidí, Kaasx̱ʼagweidí, and Taalḵweidí clans. Chief Shakes Tribal House, which is known in Tlingit as Shéiksh Hídi "Shakes House", is a replica of traditional Tlingit houses. It was constructed by CCC crews in the 1930s in the Great Depression, according to traditional knowledge and methods. It stands at the original location of Shakes House, on Shakes Island inside Wrangell harbor. Today the Wrangell Cooperative Association, a Tlingit IRA council and the federally recognized tribe for the area, maintains Shakes Island and the House, as well as Totem Park near the city center.

=== 21st century ===
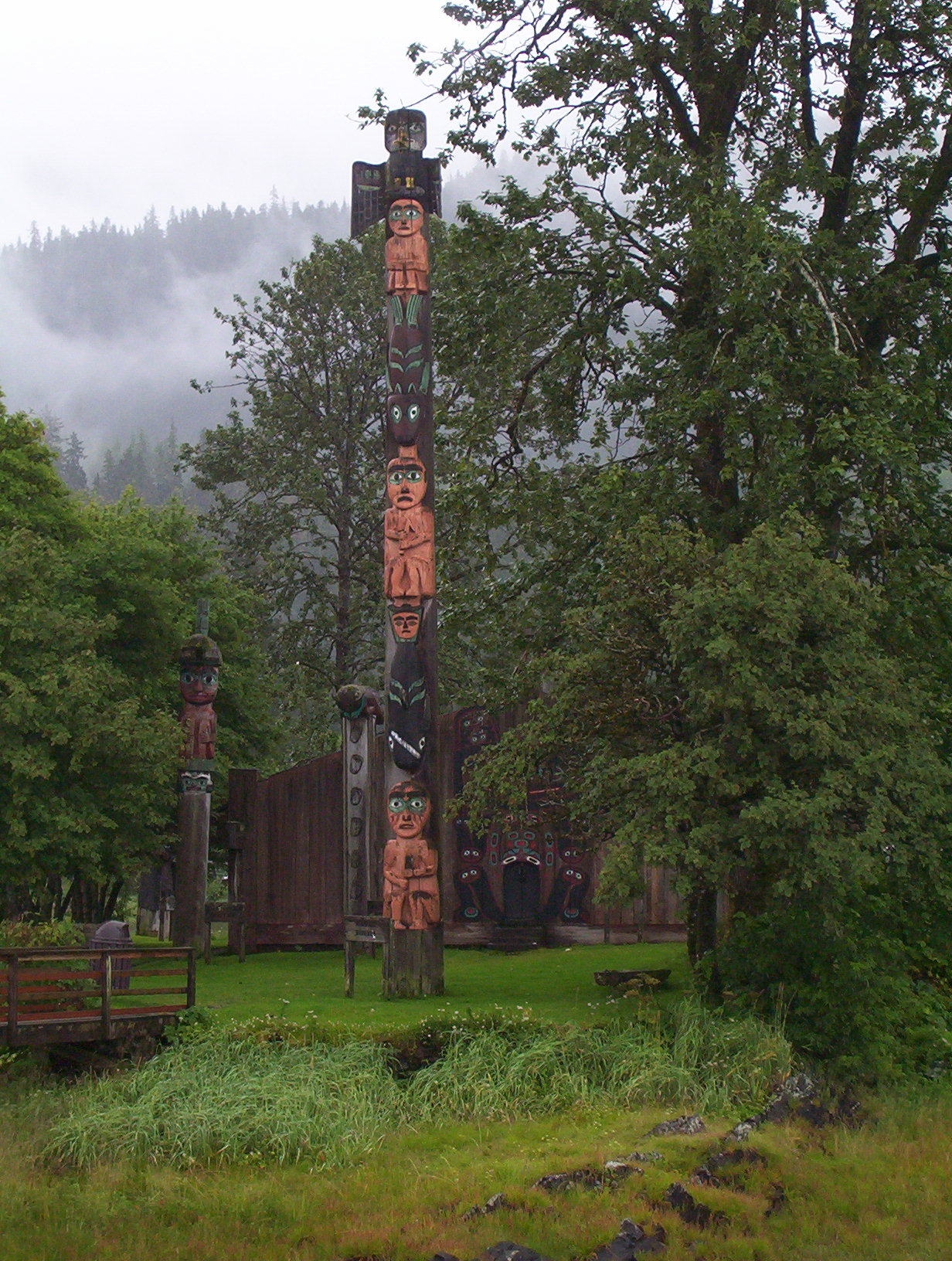
Totem poles at the Shakes house

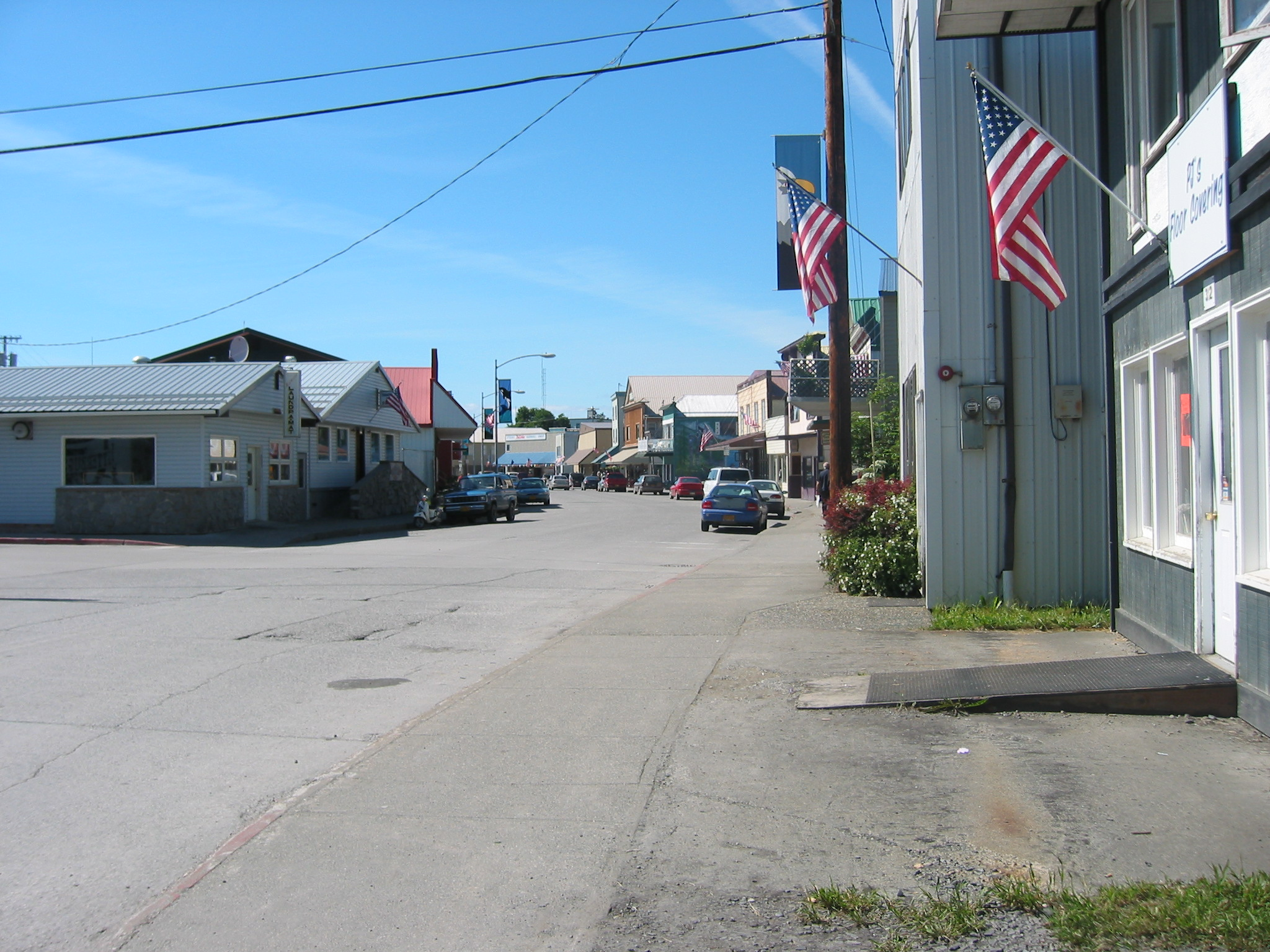
Wrangell downtown

In an election held on May 6, 2008, to decide whether to upgrade from city to borough status, 63.99% of the votes were in favor of borough status. On May 30, 2008, Wrangell was reincorporated as the City and Borough of Wrangell. Canadian American Donald McConachie Sr. was the first mayor of the CBW. He was succeeded by Jeremy M. Maxand, but was elected in 2012 as mayor again after Maxand declined to seek reelection.

The Wrangell Cooperative Association has commissioned a team to restore Chief Shakes House and the totems at Totem Park. It consists of a master carver, Wayne Price, and six assistants, four of them women, accepted after intensive training in the use of the traditional adze tool.

In 2023, six people died when a landslide struck the town.

== Geography ==
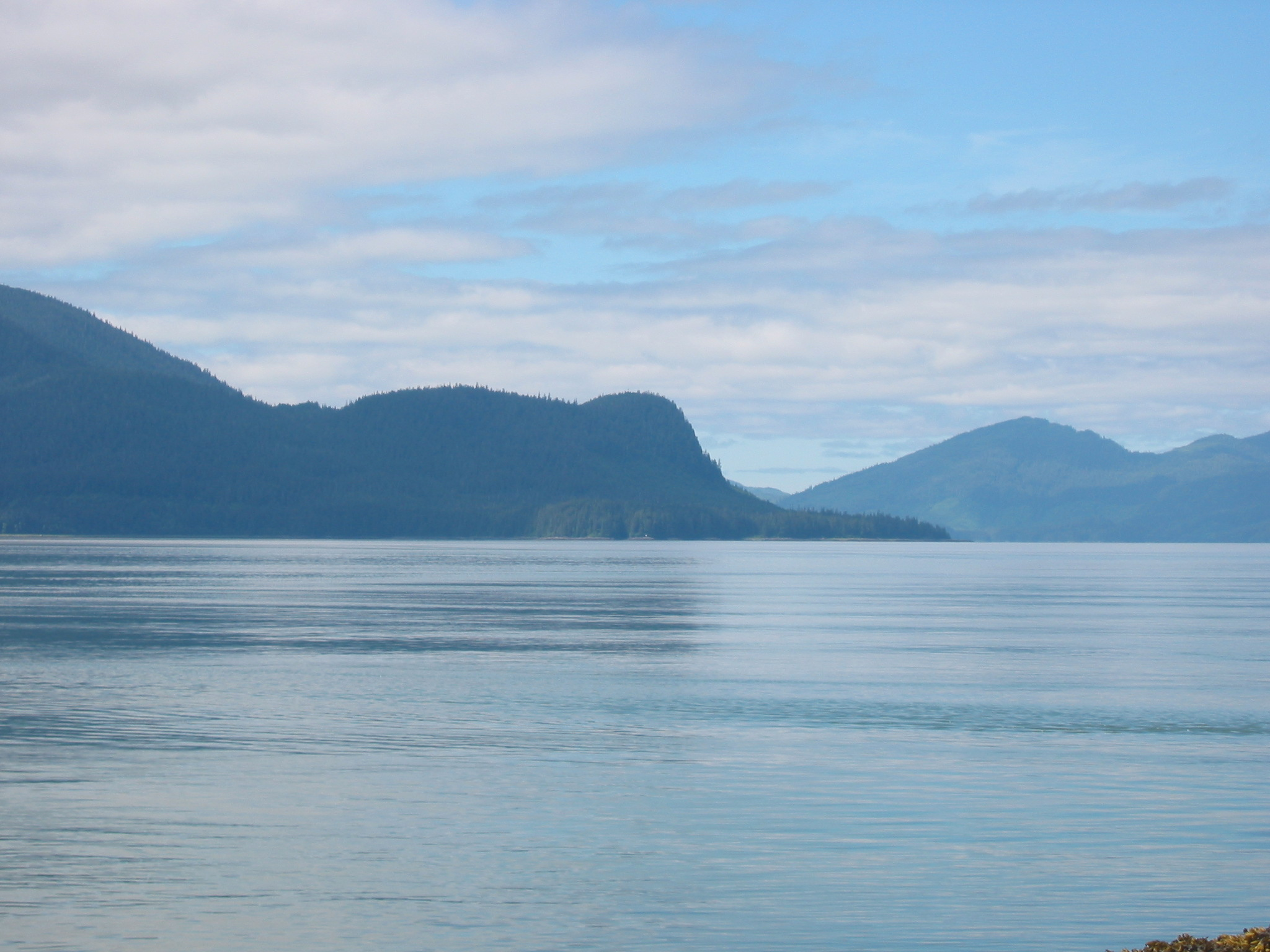
"Elephant's Nose" point on Woronkofski Island from Wrangell

Wrangell is located on the northern tip of Wrangell Island, an island in the Alaska Panhandle. It is 155 miles (250 km) south of the Alaskan capital of Juneau. It is across the narrow Zimovia Strait from the mouth of the Stikine River on the Alaska mainland. The town is named after the island, which was named after Ferdinand Petrovich Wrangel, a Russian explorer and the administrator of the Russian-American Company from 1830 to 1835.

Per the 2010 United States census, the borough has a total area of 3,462 square miles (8,970 km^{2}), of which 2,541 square miles (6,580 km^{2}) is land and 921 square miles (2,390 km^{2}) is water. The former City of Wrangell, as of the 2000 census, had a total area of 70.844 square miles (183.5 km^{2}), of which 45.278 square miles (117.27 km^{2}) was land and 25.566 square miles (66.2 km^{2}) was water.

=== Adjacent boroughs and census area ===
- Petersburg Borough, Alaska
- Prince of Wales–Hyder Census Area, Alaska
- Ketchikan Gateway Borough, Alaska
- Regional District of Kitimat–Stikine, British Columbia, Canada - east

== Climate ==
According to the Köppen climate classification system, Wrangell has an oceanic climate (Cfb). Summers are mild and rainy with cool nights. Winters are moderately cold, though not very cold by Alaskan standards.

Climate data for Wrangell, Alaska (1991–2020 normals, extremes 1917–present)
| Month | Jan | Feb | Mar | Apr | May | Jun | Jul | Aug | Sep | Oct | Nov | Dec | Year |
|---|---|---|---|---|---|---|---|---|---|---|---|---|---|
| Record high °F (°C) | 62 (17) | 65 (18) | 61 (16) | 77 (25) | 86 (30) | 91 (33) | 92 (33) | 85 (29) | 82 (28) | 72 (22) | 66 (19) | 60 (16) | 92 (33) |
| Mean maximum °F (°C) | 49.0 (9.4) | 48.7 (9.3) | 51.9 (11.1) | 62.0 (16.7) | 69.6 (20.9) | 76.2 (24.6) | 74.8 (23.8) | 74.8 (23.8) | 65.3 (18.5) | 58.3 (14.6) | 50.5 (10.3) | 49.0 (9.4) | 79.2 (26.2) |
| Mean daily maximum °F (°C) | 36.3 (2.4) | 38.5 (3.6) | 42.3 (5.7) | 49.5 (9.7) | 57.9 (14.4) | 61.2 (16.2) | 63.7 (17.6) | 63.3 (17.4) | 57.5 (14.2) | 49.2 (9.6) | 41.2 (5.1) | 37.3 (2.9) | 49.8 (9.9) |
| Daily mean °F (°C) | 32.5 (0.3) | 34.3 (1.3) | 37.3 (2.9) | 43.4 (6.3) | 50.8 (10.4) | 55.3 (12.9) | 58.0 (14.4) | 57.5 (14.2) | 52.7 (11.5) | 45.2 (7.3) | 37.8 (3.2) | 33.9 (1.1) | 44.9 (7.2) |
| Mean daily minimum °F (°C) | 28.8 (−1.8) | 30.1 (−1.1) | 32.3 (0.2) | 37.4 (3.0) | 43.7 (6.5) | 49.3 (9.6) | 52.2 (11.2) | 51.8 (11.0) | 47.9 (8.8) | 41.3 (5.2) | 34.5 (1.4) | 30.5 (−0.8) | 40.0 (4.4) |
| Mean minimum °F (°C) | 11.3 (−11.5) | 17.2 (−8.2) | 20.3 (−6.5) | 28.8 (−1.8) | 35.5 (1.9) | 42.3 (5.7) | 46.7 (8.2) | 45.8 (7.7) | 39.3 (4.1) | 31.1 (−0.5) | 23.5 (−4.7) | 17.8 (−7.9) | 7.1 (−13.8) |
| Record low °F (°C) | −10 (−23) | −8 (−22) | 0 (−18) | 16 (−9) | 22 (−6) | 30 (−1) | 32 (0) | 31 (−1) | 22 (−6) | 18 (−8) | 1 (−17) | −7 (−22) | −10 (−23) |
| Average precipitation inches (mm) | 8.01 (203) | 6.13 (156) | 6.09 (155) | 4.94 (125) | 4.79 (122) | 4.29 (109) | 5.36 (136) | 6.99 (178) | 11.49 (292) | 13.91 (353) | 10.01 (254) | 9.20 (234) | 91.21 (2,317) |
| Average snowfall inches (cm) | 18.4 (47) | 12.4 (31) | 7.9 (20) | 0.8 (2.0) | 0.0 (0.0) | 0.0 (0.0) | 0.0 (0.0) | 0.0 (0.0) | 0.0 (0.0) | 0.1 (0.25) | 5.8 (15) | 12.6 (32) | 58.0 (147) |
Source 1: NOAA (Precipitation 1981–2010)
Source 2: WRCC

=== National protected areas ===
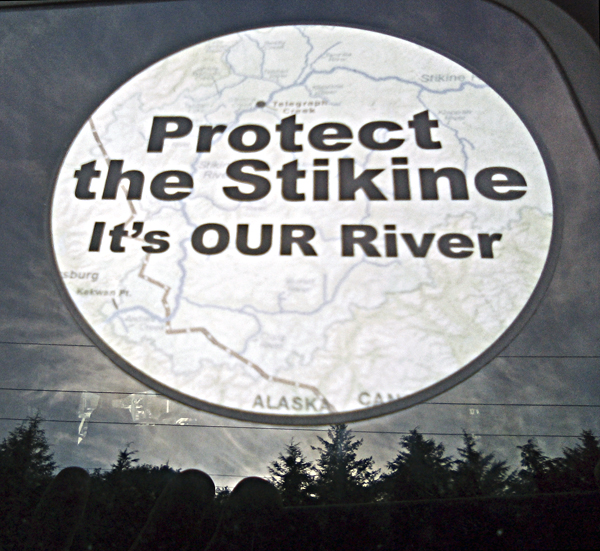
Southeast Alaska Conservation Council

- Tongass National Forest (part)
  - South Etolin Wilderness
  - Stikine-LeConte Wilderness (part)

== Economy ==
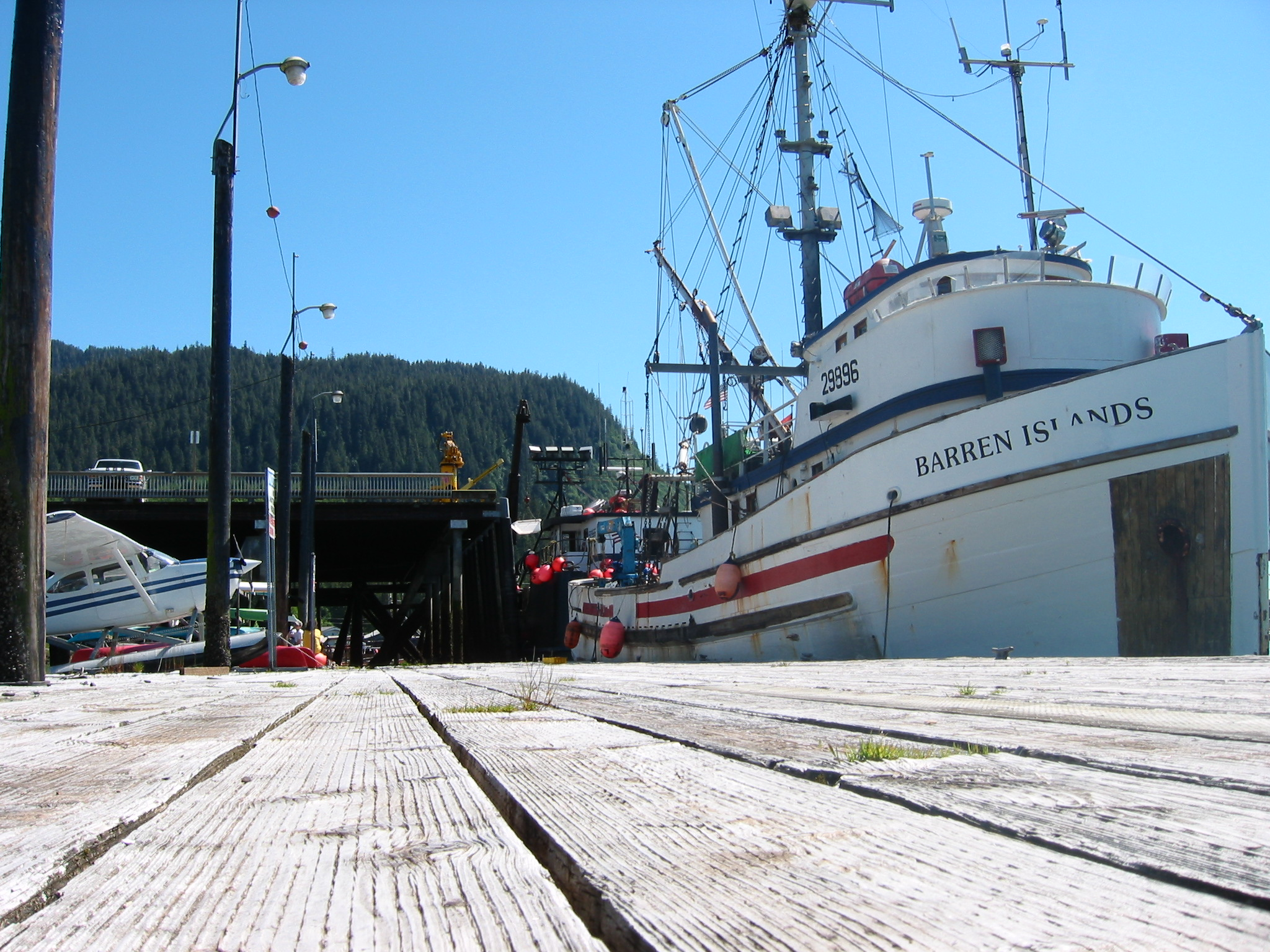
Fishing boat at Wrangell dock

The primary industry of the city is fishing. A commercial fishing fleet is harbored in Wrangell and several sports fishing guiding services operate here as well taking tourists and wilderness adventurers to remote locations on the great Stikine River branching eastward into British Columbia. Boatyards have increased in scale allowing storage and repairs of larger vessels. The city has a picturesque golf course with a view of Mount Wrangell. Like many S.E. Alaskan communities state government spending is important to the local economy, though not to the extent of Juneau-the state capitol. The Federal government also kicks in a share with the forest service, postal service and homeland security operations expenditures.

The southernmost terminus of the vast Juneau Icefield is just north of the Stikine with several glaciers flowing down to the river and saltwater at LeConte Bay. Though the number of Chinook salmon has been devastated by commercial over-harvesting recently and the fishery was largely closed in spring 2018, hope for its recovery abounds since fisheries have crashed in S.E. Alaska recurrently over history and recovered.

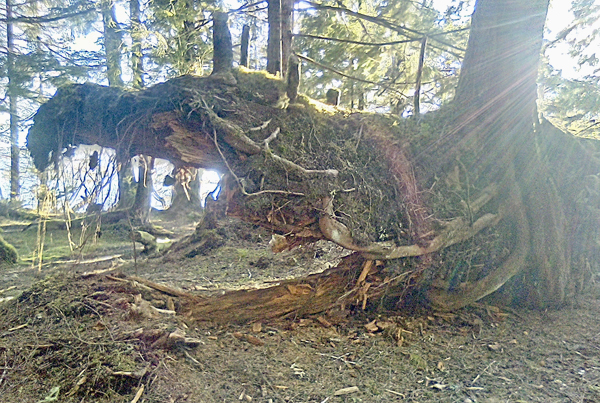
Salmon tree Wrangell Alaska

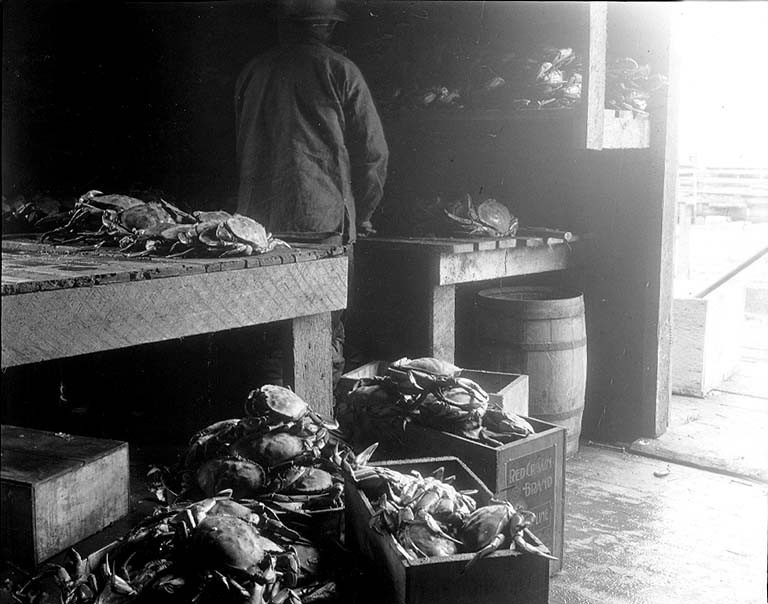
Preparing crabs for shipment at Andrew Arneson's place, September 1910

Whales live seasonally in the waters of the Alexander Archipelago and visit Wrangell searching for herring and salmon creating good photo opportunities. The former vast Alaska Pulp Corporation logging operations at Wrangell closed down in the mid-1990s unable to meet water quality standards though cutting hundreds of millions of board feet of lumber annually. Wrangell has three marinas on the northwest side of the island and the southernmost; Shoemaker Bay, is undergoing renewal construction in September 2018.

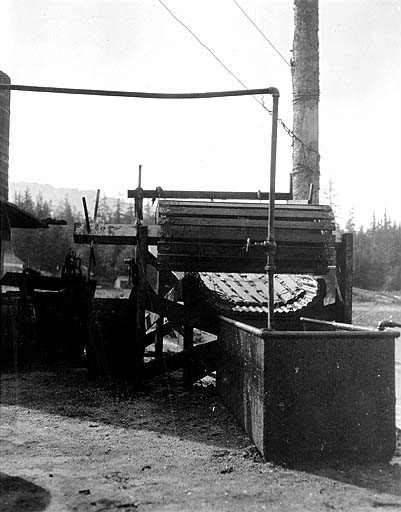
F.W. cannery tanks and equipment for tarring gillnets in Wrangell, 1918

A Tlingit cultural center and museum is located on the waterfront of Wrangell. In order to keep a small-town rural aesthetic, the city turned down the prospect of building a state prison and home-porting a naval vessel. The Stikine Inn was remodeled to fine shape, and an inter-island ferry business was established with service to Prince of Wales Island. Sunrise Aviation, an air work and tourism float plane service, continues to provide service anywhere in the region, though helicopter journeys to high mountain glaciers need to be scheduled from Ketchikan to the south 100 miles (Ketchikan is from the Tlingit word Kootchikan meaning place of stinky fish).

Baron Von Wrangell sent Lieutenant Dionysius Zarembo to establish a trading post on Stikine Strait in 1833 to beat the Brits. Tlingits apparently were receptive to British and Russian traders.

Today nearby Zarembo Island has an elk and moose population visited by hunting guides and parties from Wrangell.

Alaska Airlines has twice daily service to Seattle as well as Juneau, Ketchikan, Sitka, and other southeastern destinations. The Alaska Marine Highway system has a terminal with a ferry dock near the Stikine Inn. In the back of a restaurant downtown there is a marijuana sales business. Wrangell's seafood processing plant, though small and consuming much of the city's water supply seasonally, employs workers from Mexico, Russia, and Somalia.

Stikine River Delta

Wrangell has several churches, bars and a pizza store. Though, the early morning of September 15th, 2026, one of the established pizza stores/bar (The Marine Bar) suffered extensive damage in a devastating fire. The local Native Corporation—the Sealaska Corporation, contributes to the cost of local health care provisioning.

Bonnie Demerjian, Garrison Gibson, and other writers live in the city. It has guided kayak tours in summer and some of the most accessible coastal forest wilderness hiking, camping and climbing of S.E. Alaska. It is possible to follow the historic route in kayaks to the Stikine River Delta where the orphan warrior Chief Gush X'een and his band of Tlingits defeated boatloads of invading Nisga'a warriors from the south. Rather than becoming a slave the defeated Nisga'a Chief surrendered his hat and title of Shakes to Gush X'een.

The former mill site of the Alaska Pulp Corporation that was dismantled has some use sending logs and boulders via ships and a prospect for development as a cruise ship site with multipurpose western theme shops and dark ale brewery for export. The city has expanded its electrical power lines a mile and a half south on Isheyami Drive to allow a concrete production facility to power up (they bring in sand via barge from the Stikine River).

== Politics ==
Voters in Wrangell lean strongly Republican, having elected a Democrat only once, in 1964. Wrangell has accurately reflected the choice of Alaska's statewide presidential election winner in every election since the state's admission to the union in 1960.

United States presidential election results for Wrangell, Alaska
| Year | Republican | | Democratic | | Third party(ies) | |
| Year | No. | % | No. | % | No. | % |
|---|---|---|---|---|---|---|
| 1960 | 360 | 55.73% | 286 | 44.27% | 0 | 0.00% |
| 1964 | 210 | 29.83% | 494 | 70.17% | 0 | 0.00% |
| 1968 | 365 | 50.91% | 305 | 42.54% | 47 | 6.56% |
| 1972 | 422 | 59.02% | 255 | 35.66% | 38 | 5.31% |
| 1976 | 461 | 54.49% | 327 | 38.65% | 58 | 6.86% |
| 1980 | 626 | 59.68% | 292 | 27.84% | 131 | 12.49% |
| 1984 | 795 | 70.48% | 308 | 27.30% | 25 | 2.22% |
| 1988 | 812 | 67.00% | 365 | 30.12% | 35 | 2.89% |
| 1992 | 592 | 43.37% | 289 | 21.17% | 484 | 35.46% |
| 1996 | 698 | 57.07% | 248 | 20.28% | 277 | 22.65% |
| 2000 | 1,041 | 77.57% | 195 | 14.53% | 106 | 7.90% |
| 2004 | 693 | 77.87% | 164 | 18.43% | 33 | 3.71% |
| 2008 | 858 | 68.92% | 356 | 28.59% | 31 | 2.49% |
| 2012 | 738 | 64.57% | 362 | 31.67% | 43 | 3.76% |
| 2016 | 757 | 66.87% | 273 | 24.12% | 102 | 9.01% |
| 2020 | 827 | 64.76% | 396 | 31.01% | 54 | 4.23% |
| 2024 | 745 | 65.58% | 359 | 31.60% | 32 | 2.82% |

== Demographics ==
Historical population
| Census | Pop. | Note | %± |
|---|---|---|---|
| 1880 | 106 | | — |
| 1890 | 316 | | 198.1% |
| 1900 | 868 | | 174.7% |
| 1910 | 743 | | −14.4% |
| 1920 | 821 | | 10.5% |
| 1930 | 948 | | 15.5% |
| 1940 | 1,162 | | 22.6% |
| 1950 | 1,263 | | 8.7% |
| 1960 | 1,315 | | 4.1% |
| 1970 | 2,029 | | 54.3% |
| 1980 | 2,184 | | 7.6% |
| 1990 | 2,479 | | 13.5% |
| 2000 | 2,308 | | −6.9% |
| 2010 | 2,369 | | 2.6% |
| 2020 | 2,127 | | −10.2% |
| 2025 (est.) | 2,007 | ▼ | −5.6% |
U.S. Decennial Census

Wrangell first appeared as an unincorporated village on the 1880 U.S. Census. There were 106 residents, of which 105 were White and 1 was Creole (Mixed Russian & Native). In 1890, it counted 316 residents of which a majority, 228, were Native, 71 were White, 15 Creole, 1 Asian and 1 Other. That count included the Chantay farming settlement & Labouchere Cannery.

In 1900, it became the 5th largest community in Alaska with 868 residents (though the racial breakdown was unspecified). In 1903, Wrangell formally incorporated. In 1910, it fell to 10th largest city in Alaska and returned 743 residents, with 419 Whites, 249 Natives and 75 Others. In 1920, it had 821 residents and remained the 10th largest city. In 1930, it was the 9th largest city with 948 residents. In 1940, it rose to 8th place. In addition to the 1,162 residents, the census also reported a separate 163 individuals living in the unincorporated areas surrounding Wrangell. The combined number of 1,325 would've placed it just ahead of 7th place Petersburg (with 1,323 residents). Beginning in 1950, Wrangell fell out of the list of top 10 largest communities in Alaska. In 2008, Wrangell became a separate city & borough.

=== 2020 census ===
Wrangell City and Borough, Alaska – Racial and ethnic composition Note: the US Census treats Hispanic/Latino as an ethnic category. This table excludes Latinos from the racial categories and assigns them to a separate category. Hispanics/Latinos may be of any race.
| Race / Ethnicity (NH = Non-Hispanic) | Pop 2010 | Pop 2020 | % 2010 | % 2020 |
|---|---|---|---|---|
| White alone (NH) | 1,699 | 1,341 | 71.72% | 63.05% |
| Black or African American alone (NH) | 4 | 0 | 0.17% | 0.00% |
| Native American or Alaska Native alone (NH) | 381 | 368 | 16.08% | 17.30% |
| Asian alone (NH) | 32 | 25 | 1.35% | 1.18% |
| Native Hawaiian or Pacific Islander alone (NH) | 1 | 2 | 0.04% | 0.09% |
| Other race alone (NH) | 1 | 11 | 0.04% | 0.52% |
| Mixed race or Multiracial (NH) | 214 | 304 | 9.03% | 14.29% |
| Hispanic or Latino (any race) | 37 | 76 | 1.56% | 3.57% |
| Total | 2,369 | 2,127 | 100.00% | 100.00% |

As of the 2020 census, the county had a population of 2,127. The median age was 48.5 years. 19.7% of residents were under the age of 18 and 22.7% of residents were 65 years of age or older. For every 100 females there were 106.3 males, and for every 100 females age 18 and over there were 107.2 males age 18 and over.

The racial makeup of the county was 63.6% White, 0.0% Black or African American, 17.9% American Indian and Alaska Native, 1.2% Asian, 0.1% Native Hawaiian and Pacific Islander, 1.4% from some other race, and 15.9% from two or more races. Hispanic or Latino residents of any race comprised 3.6% of the population.

0.0% of residents lived in urban areas, while 100.0% lived in rural areas.

There were 933 households in the county, of which 26.5% had children under the age of 18 living with them and 23.0% had a female householder with no spouse or partner present. About 33.6% of all households were made up of individuals and 12.3% had someone living alone who was 65 years of age or older.

There were 1,273 housing units, of which 26.7% were vacant. Among occupied housing units, 63.3% were owner-occupied and 36.7% were renter-occupied. The homeowner vacancy rate was 1.5% and the rental vacancy rate was 4.9%.

=== 2000 census ===
As of the 2000 census, there were 2,308 people, 907 households, and 623 families living in the city. The population density was 51.0 inhabitants per square mile (19.7/km^{2}). There were 1,092 housing units at an average density of 24.1 per square mile (9.3/km^{2}). The racial makeup of the city was 1696 White, 3 Black or African American, 358 Native American, 15 Asian, 3 Pacific Islander, 8 from other races, and 9.8% from two or more races. 23 of the population were Hispanic or Latino of any race.

There were 907 households, out of which 35.7% had children under the age of 18 living with them, 54.9% were married couples living together, 9.4% had a female householder with no husband present, and 31.3% were non-families. 26.5% of all households were made up of individuals, and 9.6% had someone living alone who was 65 years of age or older. The average household size was 2.52 and the average family size was 3.05.

In the city, the population was spread out, with 29.4% under the age of 18, 5.2% from 18 to 24, 27.3% from 25 to 44, 26.4% from 45 to 64, and 11.7% who were 65 years of age or older. The median age was 39 years. For every 100 females, there were 106.1 males. For every 100 females age 18 and over, there were 102.7 males.

The median income for a household in the city was $43,250, and the median income for a family was $54,167. Males had a median income of $43,846 versus $29,205 for females. The per capita income for the city was $21,851. About 7.3% of families and 9.0% of the population were below the poverty line, including 11.0% of those under age 18 and 9.3% of those age 65 or over.

== Schools ==
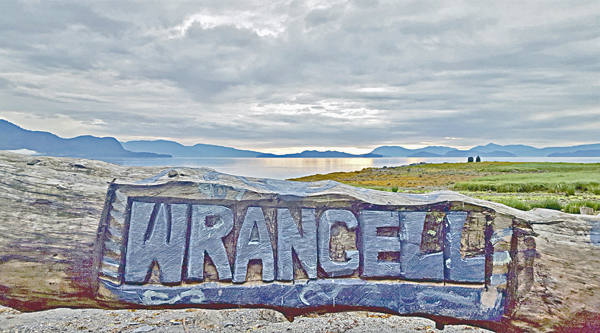
Wrangell Alaska City Park

Wrangell is a part of Wrangell Public Schools, which operates:

- Evergreen Elementary School
- Stikine Middle School
- Wrangell High School

The Wrangell Institute was an American Indian boarding school opened in 1932, which closed in 1975.

== Healthcare ==
The Wrangell Medical Center hospital is owned by the Southeast Alaska Regional Health Consortium. The Wrangell Medical Center is a critical access hospital and long-term care facility with a total of 22 beds, 8 for acute care and 14 for long-term care. Emergency care, inpatient care, imaging, lab, and physical therapy are provided by the center. Visiting specialists in internal medicine, obstetrics/gynecology, optometry, pediatrics, ophthalmology, podiatry, orthopedics, rheumatology, dietetics and dermatology complement local services. SEARHC is currently constructing a new hospital that will be opened in 2021.

Alaska Island Community Services was established in Wrangell in 1989 under the original name Wrangell Community Services, and began providing Core Mental Health Services to the Community of Wrangell. Over the next two decades the delivery of services expanded to include Disability and Senior Services, rehabilitative wilderness experience for youth, Primary Care Health Care, Dental Services, and a Pharmacy Department. As a federally qualified health center, all of the services are provided on a sliding fee discount scale based on federal guidelines.

Southeast Alaska Regional Health Consortium is a non-profit medical, dental, vision and mental health organization serving the health interests of the residents of Southeast Alaska. In 2017 SEARHC merged with local non-profit Alaska Island Community Services to form AICS, a Division of Searhc.

== Post office ==
In 1943 the federal Treasury Section of Fine Arts commissioned artist Austin Mecklem and his wife, Marianne Greer Appel, to paint a mural, Old Town in Alaska, intended for the Wrangell post office. The work was completed at their studio in New York state, transported via railway on October 19, 1943, arrived in Wrangell in December 1943 and installed in early 1944.

== Media ==
=== Newspaper ===
In print since 1902, the newspaper for the borough is The Wrangell Sentinel, the oldest continuously published newspaper in Alaska. The Petersburg Pilot, published in Petersburg is also for sale in town, along with the Juneau Empire and the Alaska Dispatch online.

=== Library ===
The primary library is the Irene Ingle Public Library. wrangell.com/library

=== Radio ===
Wrangell is served by two radio stations: KSTK broadcasts Public Radio format, and KWRG-LP has a Christian format.

== Transportation ==
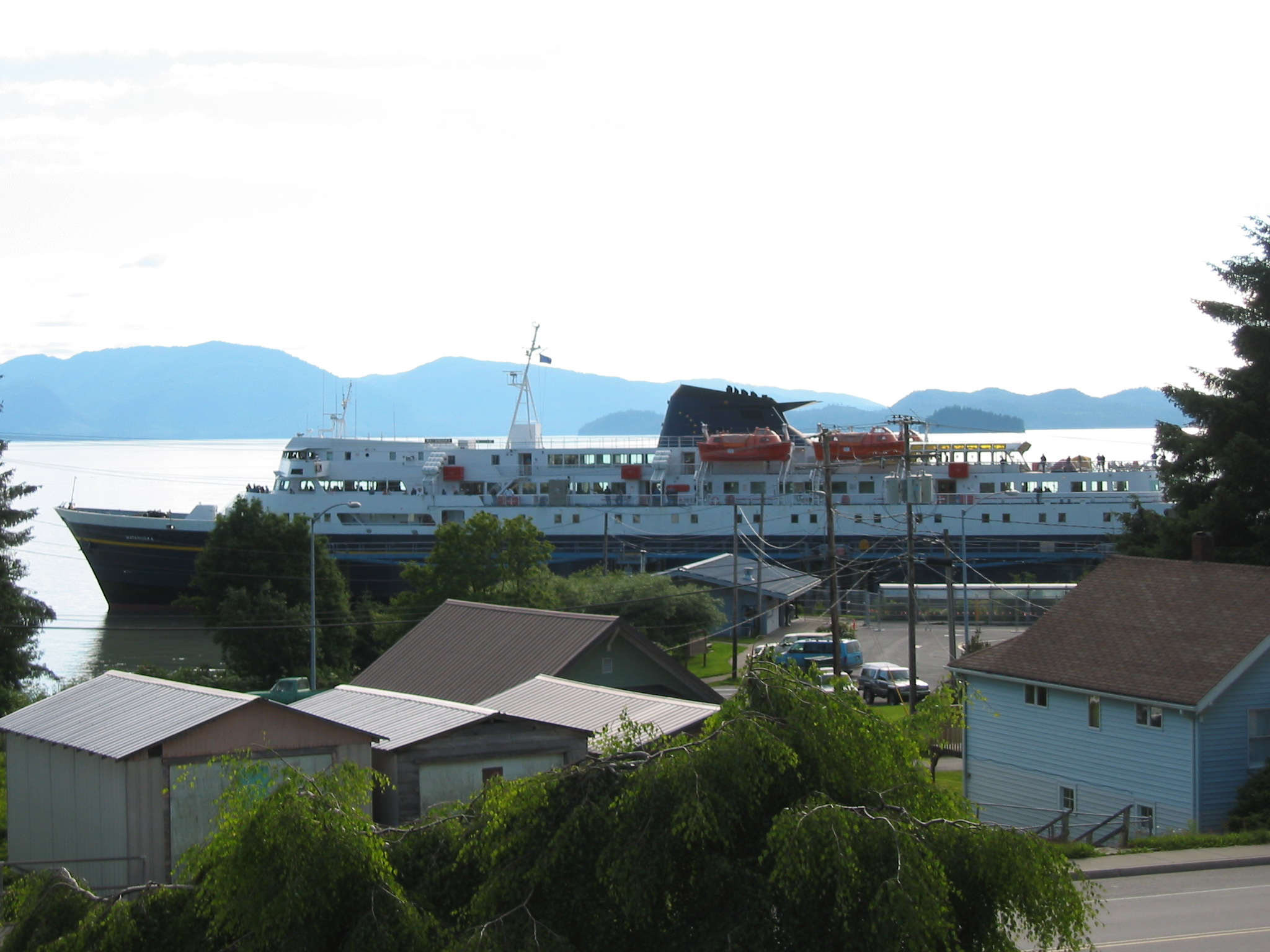
Alaska Marine Highway ferry MV Matanuska in Wrangell

On Wrangell Island, Wrangell has two forms of transportation: ferry and airplane. The island offers a network of paved roads and miles of logging trails.

=== Ferry ===
The Alaska Marine Highway serves Wrangell on its Inside Passage route with regular northbound and southbound stops linking residents and visitors to the rest of Southeast Alaska.

=== Airport ===
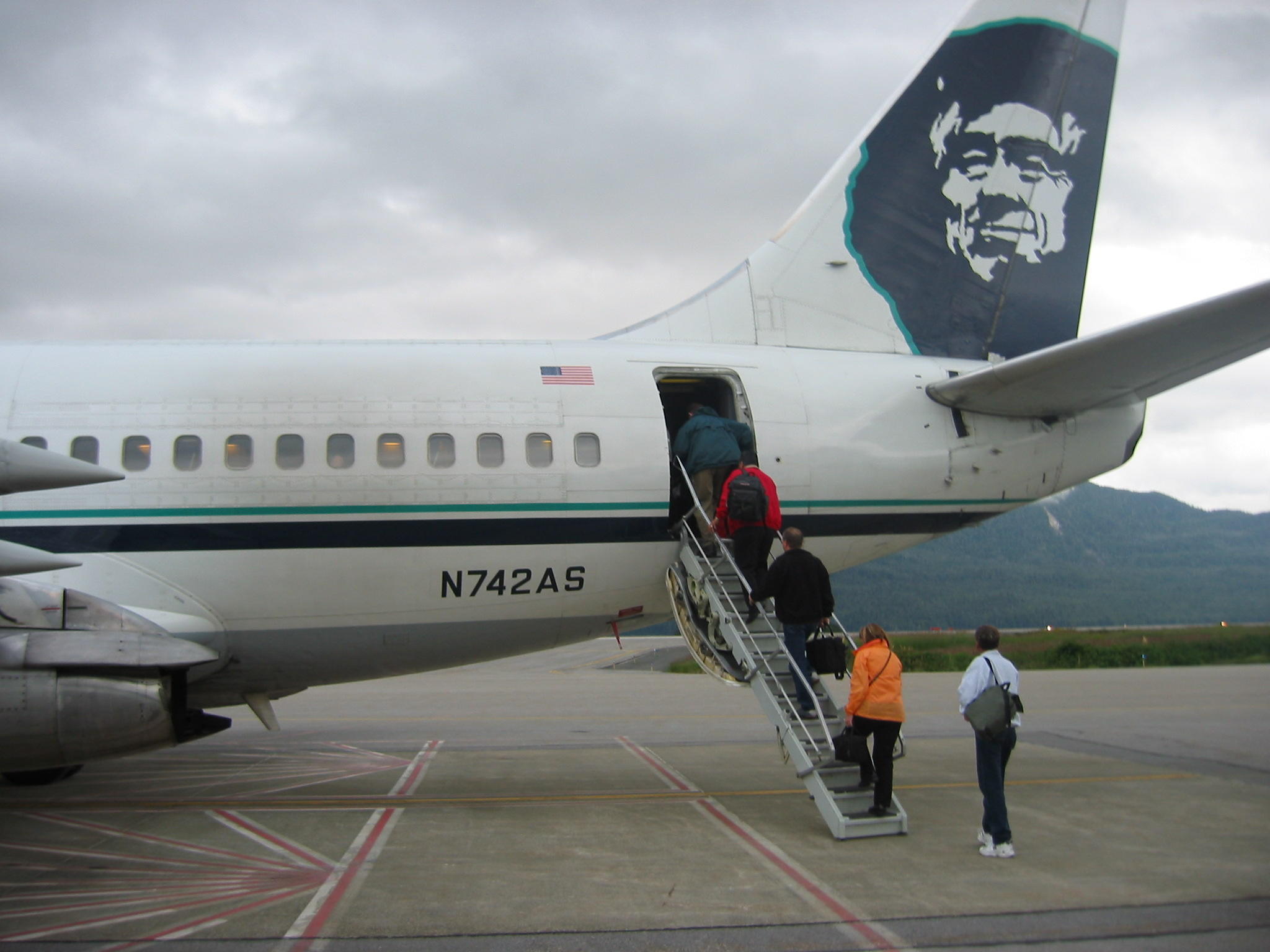
Passengers boarding an Alaska Airlines airplane at Wrangell Airport

There are two daily scheduled Boeing 737-700/800 flights; passenger jet service is operated by Alaska Airlines at the Wrangell Airport. One plane arrives in the morning and one plane in the evening. Sunrise Aviation provides float plane service to the region.

=== Roads ===
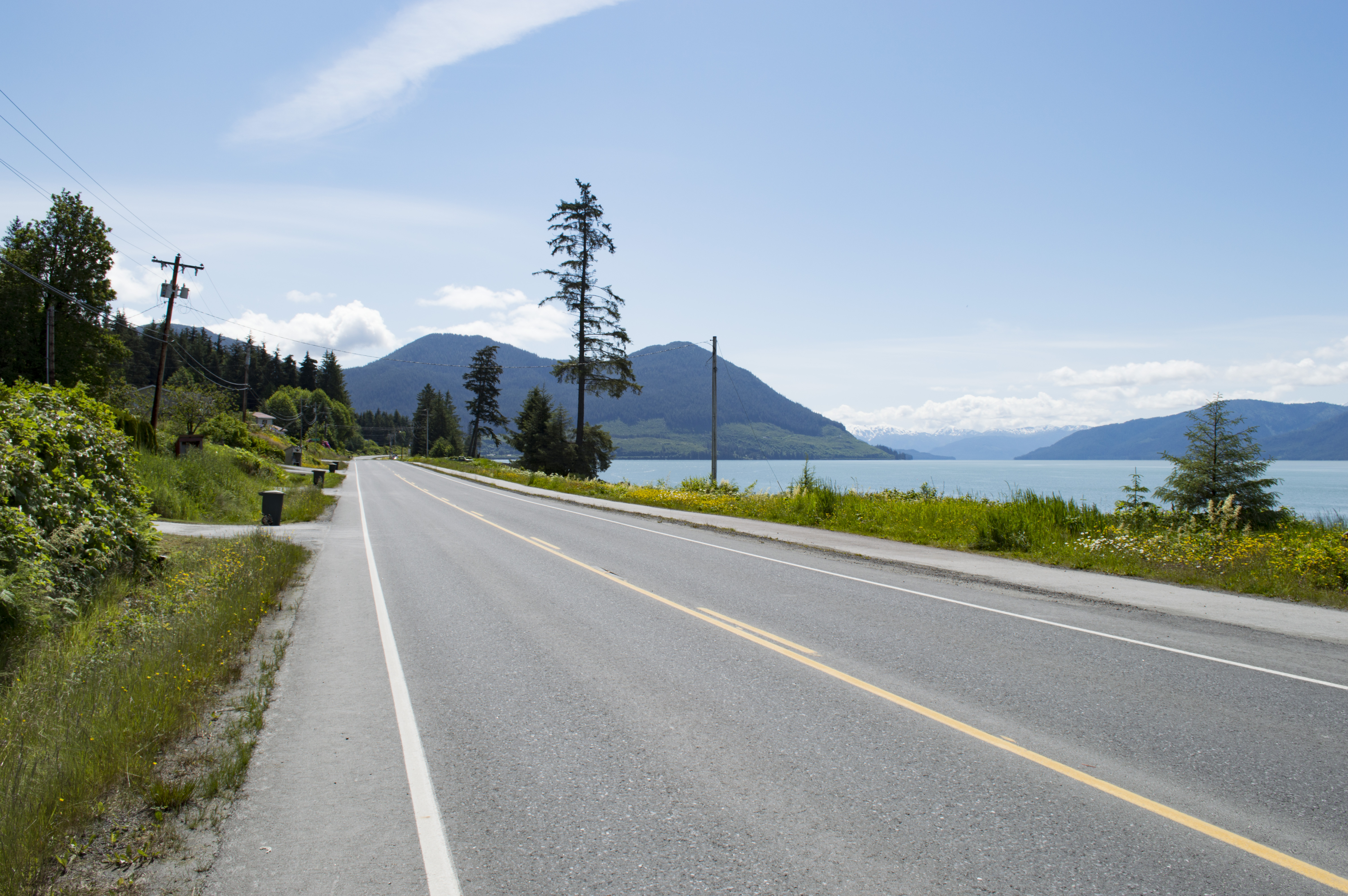
View of the Zimovia Highway just south of town

The primary road is the Zimovia Highway along the west side of the island for 14 miles. Except for the highway and most roads in town, the rest are unpaved logging trails, forest service roads, and hiking trails. Isheyama Drive, which is on the east side south of the golf course, is paved for two miles. At the former terminus of the road is a view spot of Eastern Passage for pedestrians. Ballard's, named for a fisherman, does not have safe small-boat landing. A logging road runs almost all the way through to Pat's Creek road six miles south to bisect the island east–west to Shoemaker Bay, however a half-mile or less is incomplete according to one forest service timber harvest contract. The Reagan Road has been suggested as a name for the future street.
