= Etolin Island =

Island in Wrangell City and Borough, Alaska, United States

Etolin
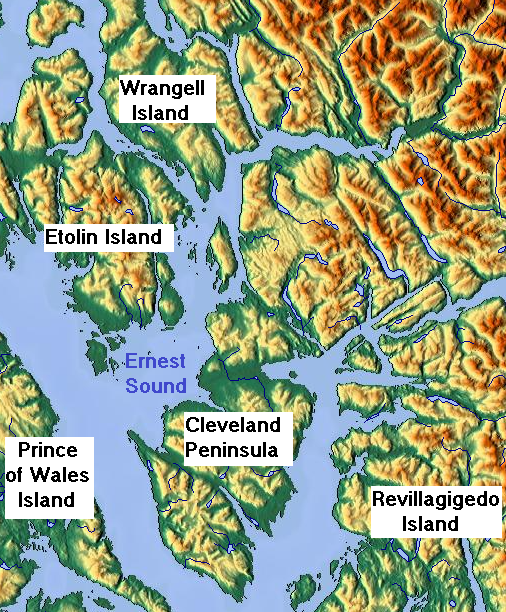

- Location within Alaska

Geography
- Location: Pacific Ocean
- Coordinates: 56°05′52″N 132°21′37″W
- Archipelago: Alexander Archipelago
- Area: 339.03 sq mi (878.1 km^{2})
- Length: 30 mi (50 km)
- Width: 22 mi (35 km)

Administration
- United States
- State: Alaska

Demographics
- Population: 15 (2000 census)

Etolin Island is an island in the Alexander Archipelago of southeastern Alaska, United States at 56°05′52″N 132°21′37″W. It is between Prince of Wales Island, to its west, and the Alaska mainland, to its east. It is southwest of Wrangell Island. It was first charted in 1793 by James Johnstone, one of George Vancouver's officers during his 1791-95 expedition. He only charted its southwest and east coasts, not realizing it was an island. It was originally named Duke of York Island but was renamed by the United States after the Alaska Purchase. It is named after Adolf Etolin, governor of the Russian American colonies from 1840 to 1845.

The island is 30 mi (48 km) long and 10–22 miles (16–35 km) wide, with a land area of 339.03 sq mi (878.08 km^{2}), making it the 24th largest island in the United States. As of the 2000 census, Etolin had a population of 15 persons.

It contains a population of introduced elk. The entire island lies within the boundaries of Tongass National Forest. The southern part of the island has been officially designated the South Etolin Wilderness.

The Etolin Canoe is a historic dugout canoe, found unfinished on the island, which is listed on the U.S. National Register of Historic Places.
