= LeConte =

Le Conte, LeConte, or Leconte may refer to:

== People ==
- Cincinnatus Leconte (1853–1912), president of Haiti 1911-1912
- Emmanuel Leconte (born 1982), French actor
- Henri Leconte (born 1963), French tennis player
- John Le Conte (1818–1891), scientist and first president of UC Berkeley
- John Eatton Le Conte (1784–1860), naturalist
- John Lawrence LeConte (1825–1883), American entomologist
- Joseph LeConte (1823–1901), geologist and professor at University of South Carolina, UC Berkeley, and founding member of the Sierra Club
- Joseph Nisbet LeConte (1870–1950), explorer and engineering professor at UC Berkeley, Sierra Club leader
- Joska Le Conté (born 1987), Dutch skeleton racer
- Maria Leconte (born 1970), French chess grandmaster
- Patrice Leconte (born 1947), French film director
- Pierre-Michel Le Conte (1921–2000), French conductor
- Valleran le Conte (fl. 1590 – c. 1615), French actor-manager
- Leconte de Lisle (1818–1894), French poet
- LeConte Stewart (1891–1990), artist and professor at the University of Utah

== Places ==
- LeConte Bay, in Alaska
- LeConte Falls, in Yosemite National Park, California
- LeConte Glacier
- LeConte Hall in Berkeley, California
- Leconte Island in Nunavut, Canada
- LeConte Memorial Lodge, in Yosemite Valley
- Le Conte Middle School, in Los Angeles
- Mount Le Conte (California)
- Mount Le Conte (Tennessee)

== Other uses ==
- Le Conte du Graal or Perceval, the Story of the Grail
- Le Conte du ventre plein, English title Bellyful, 2000 film
- Le Conte pear
- Leconte Prize, prize in mathematics and science awarded by French Academy of Sciences
- Le Conte Station, light rail station in San Francisco
- Leconte's haploa, Haploa lecontei, a moth of the subfamily Arctiinae
- Le Conte's thrasher, Toxostoma lecontei
- Le Conte's sparrow, Ammodramus leconteii
- M/V LeConte, a vessel in the Alaska Marine Highway System
