= LeConte Botanical Gardens =

Former botanical garden near Midway, Georgia, United States

- Interactive map of LeConte Botanical Gardens
- Nearest city: Midway, Georgia, U.S.
- Coordinates: 31°42′07″N 81°28′32″W
- Area: Around 1 acre (0.40 ha)
- Established: 1812
- Closed: 1838 (188 years ago)
- Founder: Louis LeConte

LeConte Botanical Gardens were located near Midway, Georgia, United States. It was established in 1812 at the Woodmanston plantation by Louis LeConte, a noted botanist. He had inherited the plantation, which his father established in 1760. In the attic of the plantation house, LeConte created a chemical laboratory in which he cultivated rare plants from all over the world.

In 1765, botanist John Bartram came across Franklinia altamaha, which was thought to have been a lost species, while traveling to the south of Woodmanston. Just over a century later, LeConte had gathered in his laboratory other species he found nearby.

LeConte had taken many of the species into his care. After the 1826 death of his 33-year-old wife, Anne, with whom he had seven children, LeConte placed all of his focus on the gardens.

This large garden was the pride of my father. Every day after his breakfast, he walked about the garden, enjoying its beauty and neatness and giving minute directions for its care and improvements.

— Joseph LeConte, speaking about his father

In 1954, the Georgia Historical Commission erected a marker referencing the gardens, which were around 1 acre (0.40 ha) of the plantation's overall 63.8 acres (25.8 ha). The marker is located 5 miles (8.0 km) east of the plantation's former site.

Now named the LeConte–Woodmanston Plantation and Botanical Garden, the site is on the National Register of Historic Places. Its roses, bulbs and camellias are being recreated, while a LeConte pear orchard commemorates LeConte's brother, John Eatton LeConte, for whom the pear is named.

The garden's upkeep ended with the death of Louis LeConte in 1838. Lumbering activities disturbed the garden's grounds, so archaeology options have been limited. The foundations of the plantation house are still visible, and a replica slave cabin has been erected.
