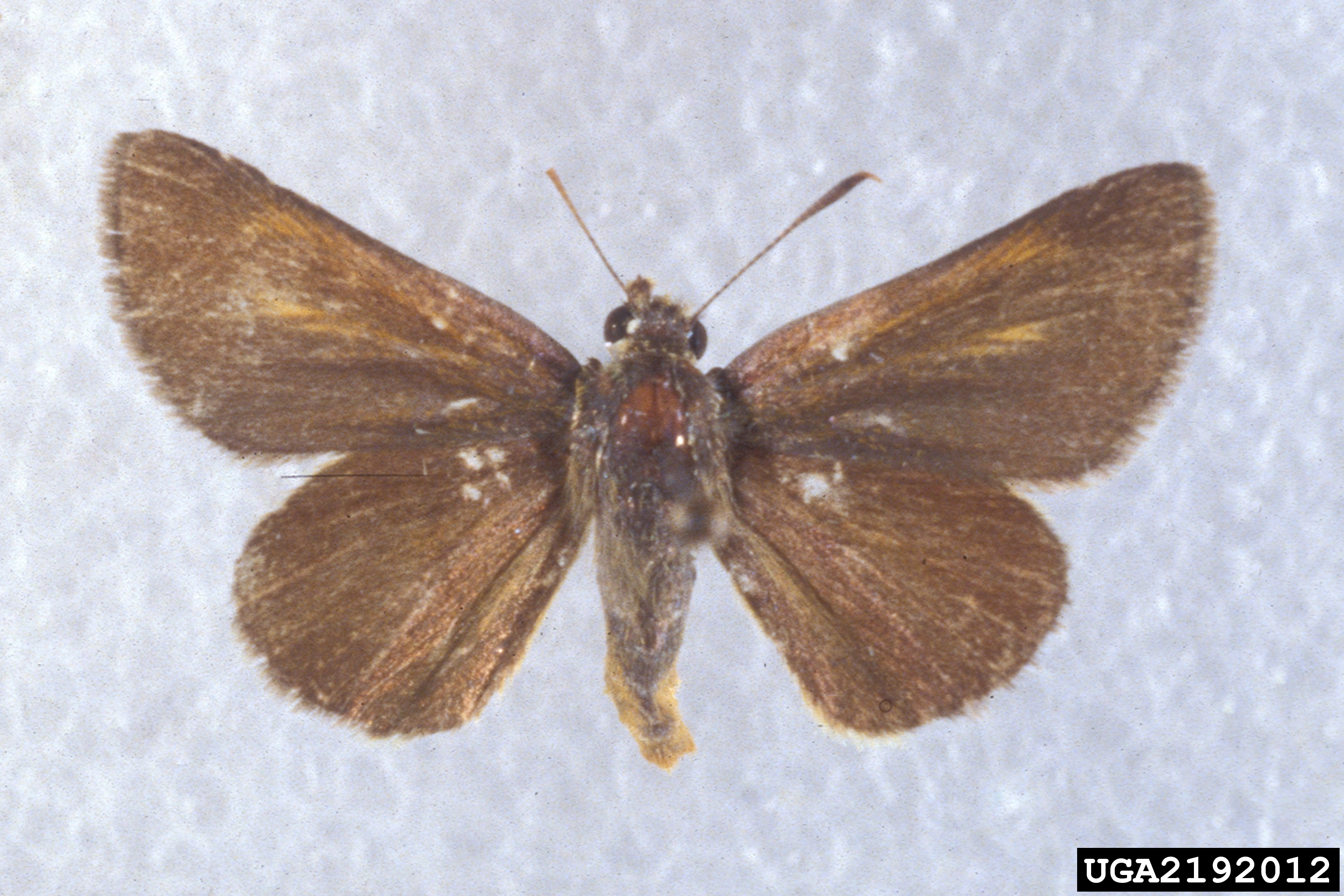

Conservation status
- Endangered (IUCN 3.1)

- Imperiled (NatureServe)

Scientific classification
- Kingdom: Animalia
- Phylum: Arthropoda
- Class: Insecta
- Order: Lepidoptera
- Family: Hesperiidae
- Genus: Atrytone
- Species: A. arogos

Binomial name
- Atrytone arogos (Boisduval & Le Conte, [1834])

Synonyms
- Hesperia arogos Boisduval & Le Conte, [1834]; Atrytone vitellius (J. E. Smith, 1797); Atrytone mutius (Plötz, 1883); Phycanassa arogos; Hesperia iowa Scudder, 1868

= Atrytone arogos =

Species of butterfly

Atrytone arogos, the arogos skipper or beard-grass skipper, is an endangered species of butterfly within the family Hesperiidae. There are two subspecies, the Atrytone arogos arogos found mainly on the southeastern coast and the Atrytone arogos iowa. The Atrytone arogos was originally misidentified as the Papilio vitellius resulting in research completed under the wrong name. Due to this, it is heavily debated when the species was discovered. Some entomologists argue that it was identified in 1833, however others claim it was identified in 1837. As it is both endangered and lacking consistent research, there is little known about the Atrytone arogos.

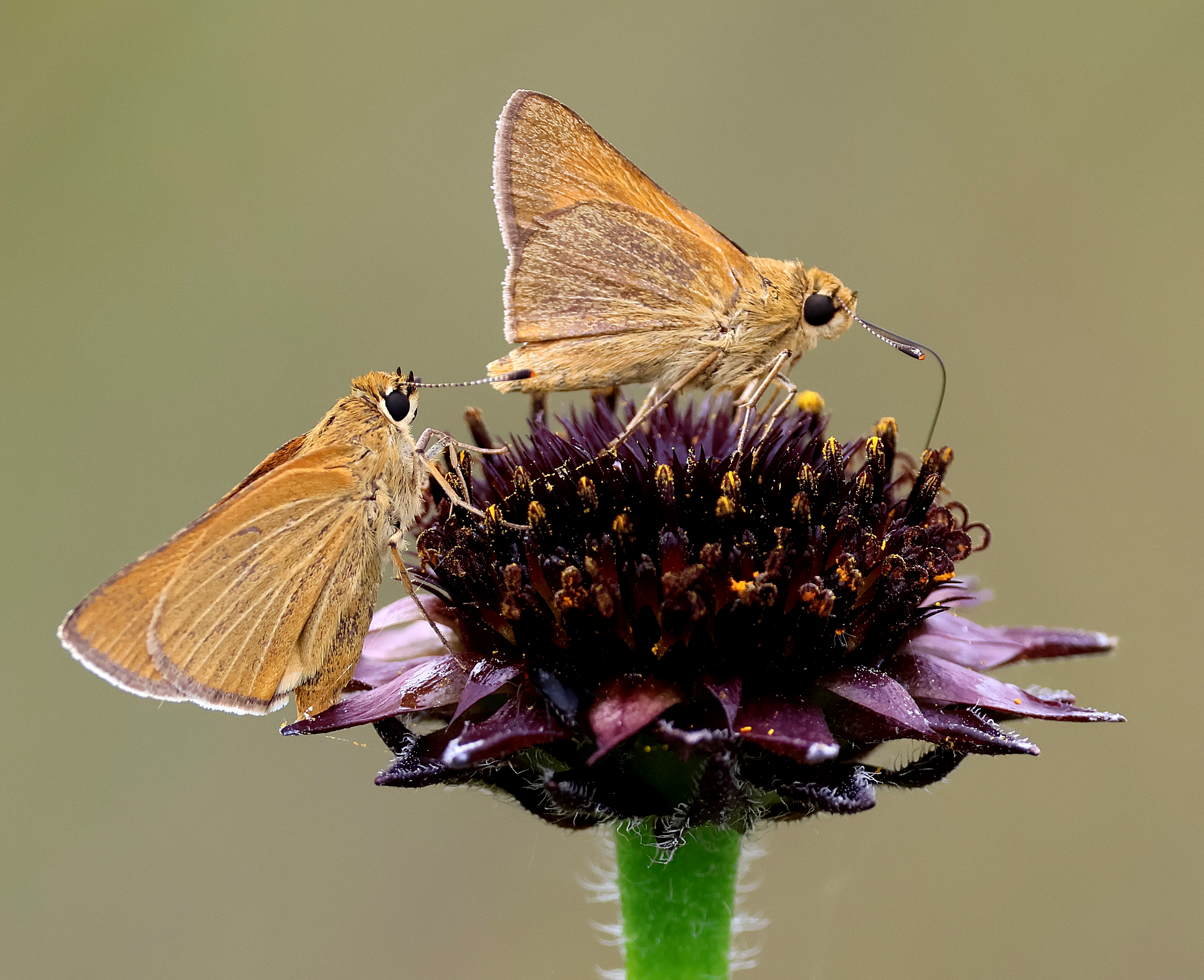
Feeding on a flower head

== Description ==
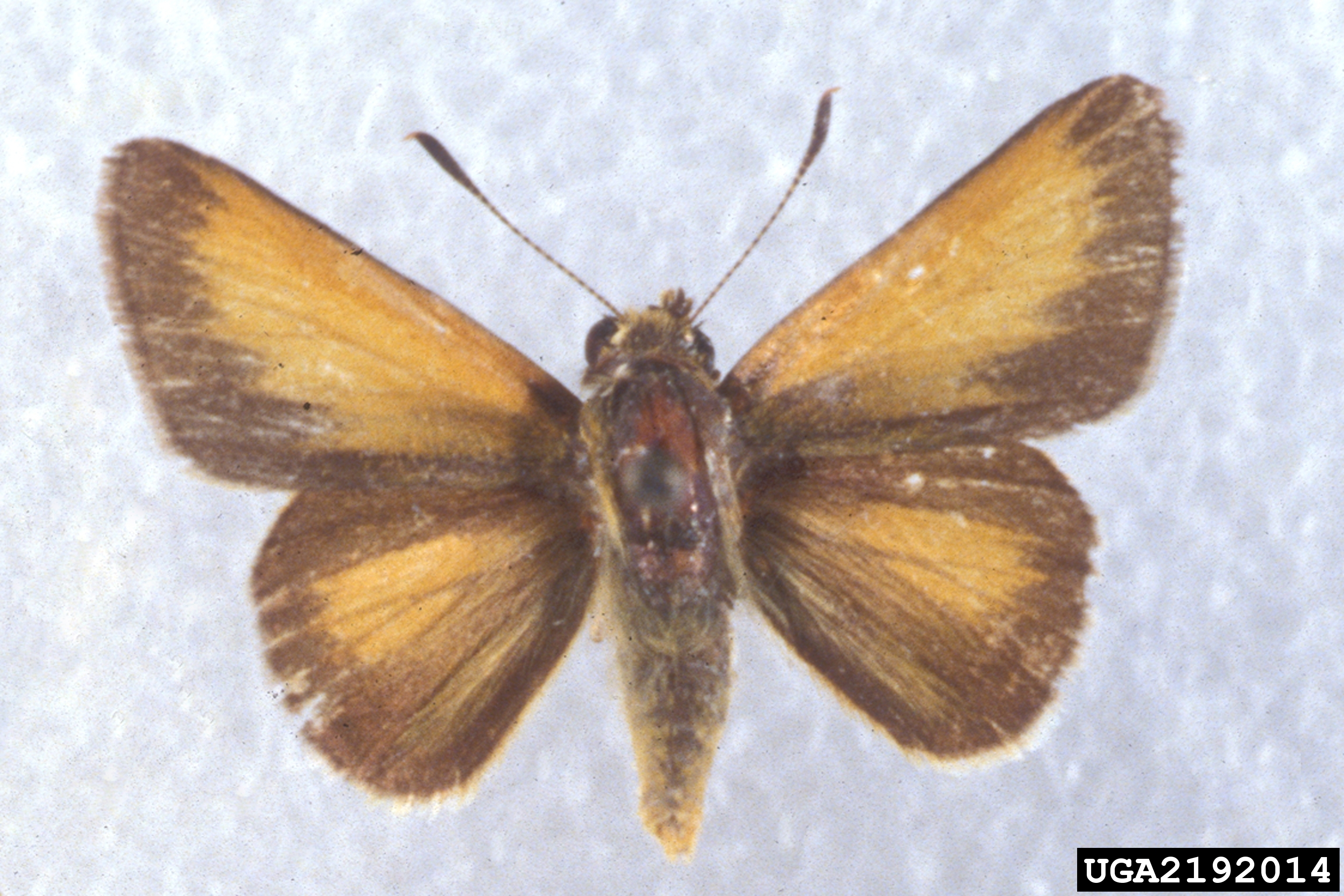

The Atrytone argos often found in the southeastern United States shares a physical resemblance with the Atrytone delaware, which can be found throughout the eastern United States.

The adult Atrytone argos has vibrant yellow wings with a dark blackish-brown boarder. Its wingspan has been measured at 2.9-3.7 cm. Male Atrytone argos butterflies have thinner black borders than the female Atrytone argos butterflies. The underside of the Atrytone argos' wings is a paler yellow color than the top of the wings. Throughout metamorphosis, the Atrytone argos undergoes five instar stages, and when the butterfly finishes all stages of metamorphosis, its physical appearance is similar to that of the fifth instar period.

== Taxonomy ==
There are two subspecies:

- Atrytone arogos arogos (nominate subspecies)
- Atrytone arogos iowa

While a lot of sources found on the Atrytone arogos arogos say that the original finding of the species was in 1833 and 1834, this is not the case. The first subspecies was found in 1837.

== Distribution and habitat ==
The Atrytone arogo is found in the Eastern and Midwestern United States, often stationed a few hundred kilometers away from the Atlantic Ocean or Gulf of Mexico. It generally resides in isolated colonies in peninsular Florida, the Gulf Coast, south-east North Dakota, southern Texas and the Colorado Front Range. Strays are found up from New Jersey to northern Arkansas. It is considered possibly extirpated from New York, Minnesota, Wyoming, Illinois, North and South Carolina, Alabama, Iowa, Georgia, Montana, as well as Pennsylvania. The Atrytone arogos thrives in grasslands and prairies, as well as flat woods and pine savannas. These ecosystems are threatened by wild fires, land management, or lack thereof, destroying viable habitats. This is a significant factor leading to their extirpation.

== Life cycle ==
=== Mating ===
Male Atrytone arogos arogos will perch on low vegetation near their host plants. These host plants vary in their region of location. A common host plant for the Atrytone arogos arogos is the big bluestem. These host plants are dense areas of grass suitable for larva. The males remain on the vegetation to find females to mate with.

=== Metamorphosis ===
The Atrytone arogos arogos undergoes metamorphosis to develop. Their life cycle begins as an egg. The egg is cream in color and has distinctive irregularly shaped red bands circling it. The female arogos skipper singularly deposits the eggs under the leaves of host plants. A larva develops from the egg. These larvae, also called caterpillars, are light bluish green in color, have a dark green line running along its dorsal side, and a light tan head with orange and brown vertical lines. The caterpillar consumes a diet of leaves. Once the caterpillar reaches fourth-stage it will complete its feeding for the next spring and begin hibernation. It finds a place to cocoon about three feet off the ground in vegetation. The chrysalis is a pale tan in color with a slightly lighter abdomen. From the chrysalis, the butterfly form of the Atrytone arogos arogos emerges.

== Adaptation and conservation ==
Overall, it appears that the Atrytone argos adapts very poorly to its environment. This is one of the major contributors to the Atrytone argos status as an endangered species, because it is not expected to recover from its endangered state and will likely become extinct. The endangered status of this species is also primarily due to the fact that prairies are being rapidly destroyed. This, combined with the Atrytone argos' low ability to adapt, has resulted in a rapid decline in the Atrytone argos population.

In addition, other butterflies in the Atrytone genus, specifically those in the midwestern United States, have struggled to adapt to the abundance of wildfires seen in that region. As malls, industries, and the development of cities and suburbs overtake the natural prairie lands in America, the natural habitat of the Atrytone arogos declines. Due to these changes, along with natural disasters, such as wildfires and tornadoes, the Atrytone arogos is predicted to become extinct in the near future unless a management plan is put into action. Some measures that can be put in place to save the species include developing a plan to preserve existing populations and performing studies and experiments aimed at discovering more about the species in order to save the butterfly. It can be concluded that the Atrytone argos, similar to the other species within the Atrytone genus, struggles to adapt to the environmental changes that are occurring throughout North America.

== Diet ==
The larvae feed on Andropogon gerardi, Panicum, Calamovilfa brevipilis and other grasses. Adults feed on the nectar from flowers of purple vetch, Canada thistle, dogbane, stiff coreopsis, purple coneflower, green milkweed and ox-eye daisy.
