= NOAAS Mount Mitchell =

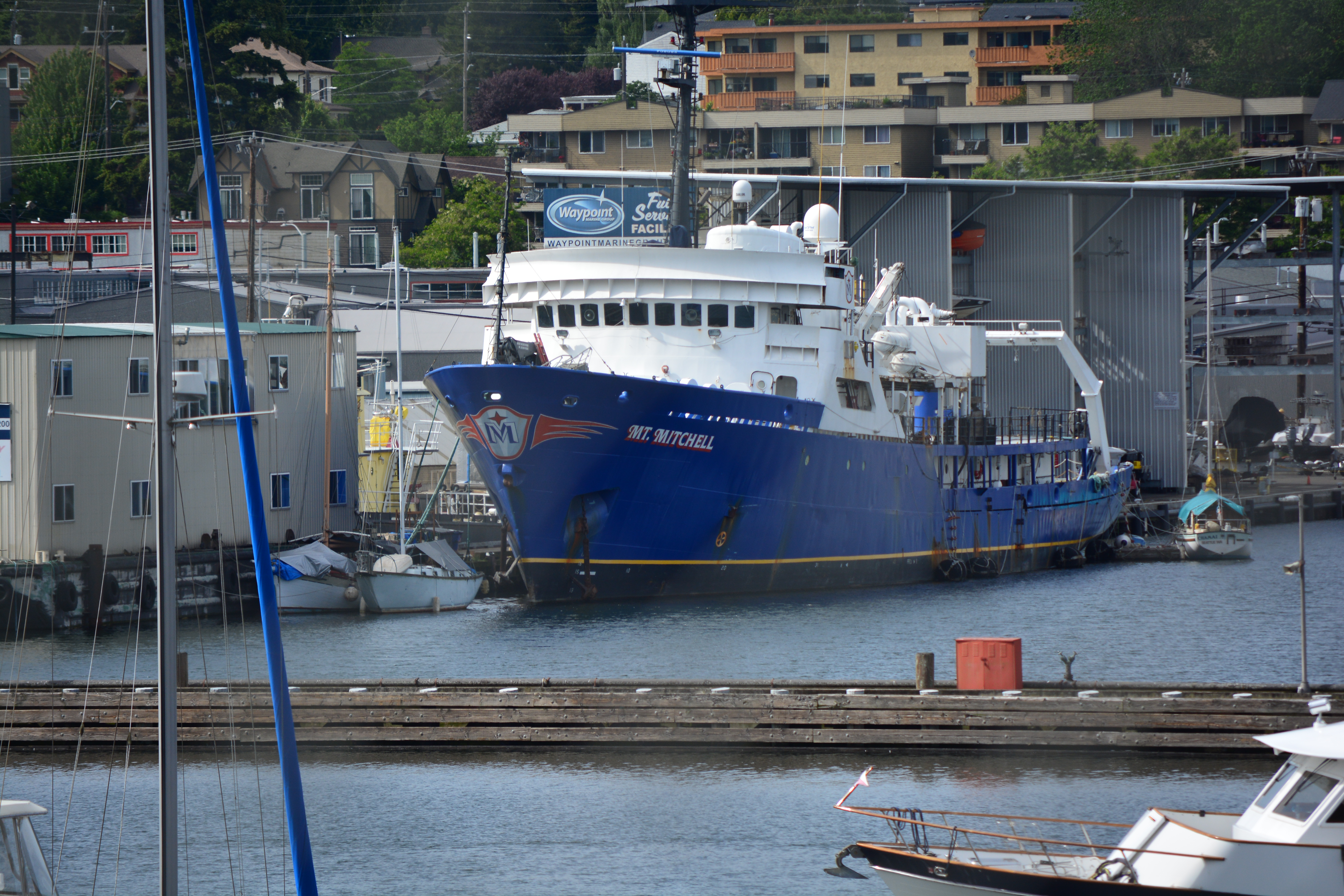
- Mount Mitchell docked on the south side of Salmon Bay, Seattle, Washington, United States, 2020.

History

U.S. Coast And Geodetic Survey
- Name: USC&GS Mount Mitchell (MSS 22)
- Namesake: Mount Mitchell in North Carolina
- Builder: Aerojet-General Shipyards, Jacksonville, Florida
- Launched: 29 November 1966
- Commissioned: 23 March 1968
- Fate: Transferred to National Oceanic and Atmospheric Administration 3 October 1970

NOAA
- Name: NOAAS Mount Mitchell (S 222)
- Namesake: Previous name retained
- Acquired: Transferred from U.S. Coast and Geodetic Survey 3 October 1970
- Decommissioned: 1995
- Stricken: 1995
- Home port: Norfolk, Virginia
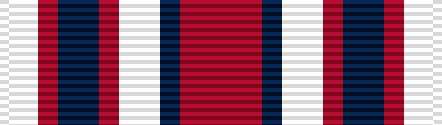
- Honors and awards: Department of Commerce Silver Medal 1992
- Fate: Sold 2001

Private ownership
- Name: R/V Mt. Mitchell
- Namesake: Abbreviated version of previous name
- Owner: Mount Mitchell LLC
- Operator: Global Seas LLC
- Acquired: Purchased 2001
- In service: 2003
- Home port: Seattle, Washington
- Identification: IMO number: 6710932; MMSI number: 369190000; Callsign: WDA9674
- Status: sold in 2023 to the Navy of Uruguay

General characteristics (U.S. Government service)
- Class & type: Fairweather-class hydrographic survey ship
- Type: S1-MT-27a
- Tonnage: 1,591 gross register tons; 578 net register tons
- Displacement: 1,800 tons
- Length: 70.4 m (231 ft)
- Beam: 12.8 m (42 ft) moulded
- Draft: 4.4 m (14 ft) maximum
- Installed power: 2,400 shaft horsepower (3.2 megawatts)
- Propulsion: Two 1,200 hp (0.89 MW) General Motors geared diesel engines, 2 shafts, 107,000 US gallons (410,000 L) fuel; one 200 hp (0.15 MW) Detroit Diesel/Bird Johnson geared through-hull bow thruster
- Speed: 12 to 12.5 knots (22.2 to 23.2 km/h) (cruising)
- Range: 5,898 nautical miles (10,923 km)
- Endurance: 22 days
- Boats & landing craft carried: Three or four 8.8 m (29 ft) survey launches, two motor whaleboats, three Boston Whaler utility boats
- Complement: 49 (10 NOAA Corps officers, 4 licensed engineers, and 35 other crew members), plus up to 4 scientists
- Notes: Ice-strengthened hull; 300 kilowatts electrical power plus 75-kilowatt emergency generator

NOAAS Mount Mitchell (S 222) was an American survey vessel in commission in the National Oceanic and Atmospheric Administration from 1970 to 1995. Prior to her NOAA career, she was in commission in the United States Coast and Geodetic Survey as USC&GS Mount Mitchell (MSS 22) from 1968 to 1970. In 2003, she returned to service as the private research ship R/V Mt. Mitchell then in 2023 was sold to the Government of Uruguay who still operate her in 2026.

== Construction and commissioning ==
Mount Mitchell was built for the U.S. Coast and Geodetic Survey as a "medium survey ship" (MSS) at the Aerojet-General Shipyards in Jacksonville, Florida. Launched on 29 November 1966, she was commissioned into the Coast and Geodetic Survey in March 1968 as USC&GS Mount Mitchell (MSS 22). When the Survey merged with other organizations to form NOAA in 1970, she became part of the NOAA fleet as NOAAS Mount Mitchell (S 222). She is the sister ship of NOAAS Fairweather (S 220) and NOAAS Rainier (S 221), which are both still in service with NOAA.

== USC&GS and NOAAS Mount Mitchell, 1968–1995 ==
Mount Mitchell operated as a multipurpose vessel. She had an oceanographic laboratory, several echosounders, and an oceanographic winch. She also had a hydroplot data-processing system, as did two of her survey launches.

Mount Mitchell conducted hydrographic surveys on the United States East Coast and in the Caribbean, and served as an oceanographic vessel throughout much of the North Atlantic Ocean on various projects. In the late 1980s she was fitted with a multi-beam sounding system for hydrographic work related to establishing the maritime exclusive economic zone of the United States and discovered Mitchell Dome among other large, economically significant undersea features in the Gulf of Mexico. In 1992 she proceeded to the Persian Gulf to study the effects of the 1990–1991 Persian Gulf War oil spills into the Gulf. After returning to the United States, she resumed operations as a hydrographic survey vessel until decommissioning in 1995.

=== Awards ===
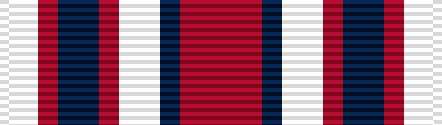
Department of Commerce Silver Medal

In a ceremony on 9 November 1992 in Washington, D.C., Mount Mitchell was awarded the Department of Commerce Silver Medal for her 1990–1991 Persian Gulf cruise. The program for the ceremony cited her achievements as follows:

NOAA Ship Mt. Mitchell, Atlantic Marine Center, completed a historic cruise surveying environmental damage in the Persian Gulf caused by oil spills. The cruise is the first major oceanographic survey of the Persian Gulf since 1977 and is the most comprehensive ever in terms of geographic and subject area coverage. Conquering numerous obstacles in a dangerous environment, the crew of the Mt. Mitchell acquired data against which future changes in water quality can be assessed.

== R/V Mt. Mitchell, 2001–2023 ==
After six years of inactivity, the decommissioned Mount Mitchell was purchased in 2001 by Mt. Mitchell LLC and was completely refurbished and retrofitted with the latest in electronics, machinery, and safety equipment. With her refit complete, she arrived in Seattle, Washington, in 2003 to begin her career as the private research ship R/V Mt. Mitchell. She is managed and operated by Global Seas LLC, headquartered in Seattle.

In 2006, the vessel was chartered by the Waitt Historical Foundation along with the undersea search firm Nauticos to conduct a three month subsea search for the wreck of Amelia Earhart's Lockheed Electra airplane on the seafloor west and northwest of Howland Island which yielded no results.

In 2008, Mt. Mitchell was outfitted with the most advanced underwater mapping equipment available. Her Kongsberg EM 120 and EM 710 high-resolution multibeam mapping systems offer a state-of-the-art capability to perform seabed mapping to full ocean depth with unrivaled resolution, coverage, and accuracy. The EM 120 system allows for accurate surveys to a depth of 11,000 meters (36,089 feet), while the EM 710 allows for accurate mapping to a depth of 2,000 meters (6,562 feet). The vessel is an acoustically quiet platform capable of supporting sophisticated sonar operations in deep water and high sea states. To ensure ship-related noise does not degrade the vessel′s capability to perform her science mission at full performance, the sonar systems are installed in a gondola arrangement below her hull. In addition, custom-designed propellers were installed in early 2011 to improve her efficiency.

After a reasonable level of activity in the first ten years as a commercial survey vessel, the ship spent virtually all time afterwards moored at Ballard in the Lake Washington Ship Canal until ultimately being sold by her owners to the Uruguayan Navy who operates her today in 2026 conduction the same employment.

== Uruguayan Navy ==
On October 20, 2023, it was reported that the Minister of National Defense of Uruguay, Javier García, confirmed that the purchase of Mt. Mitchell for the Uruguayan Navy was ratified. The ship will serve as the new oceanographic and research vessel of the Uruguayan Navy since the retirement of Uruguayan survey ship ROU 22 Oyarvide.
