= Louis LeConte =

American botanist (1782-1838)

- Born: August 4, 1782; Shrewsbury Township, New Jersey
- Died: January 9, 1838 (aged 55)
- Resting place: Midway Cemetery, Midway, Georgia, U.S.
- Scientific career
- Fields: Natural history; Botany

Louis LeConte (August 4, 1782 – January 9, 1838) was an American naturalist and botanist.

== Early life ==
LeConte was born in 1782 near Shrewsbury Township, New Jersey, the son of John Eatton LeConte and Jane Sloane LeConte. His younger brother, John Eatton LeConte Jr., became an entomologist.

He graduated from Columbia College, Columbia University, in 1799. He then studied medicine under David Hosack, founder of Elgin Botanic Garden.

== Personal life ==
In 1810, LeConte inherited the family plantation, Woodmanston, near Midway, Georgia. Although John Le Conte usually lived in New York or New England, he spent his winters at Woodmanston, which became LeConte Botanical Gardens.

In 1812, LeConte married Anne Quarterman, with whom he had seven known children between 1812 and 1825: William, Jane, John, Louis Jr., Joseph and Anne. One child died in infancy.

== Death ==
LeConte died in 1838, aged 55. He was interred in Midway Cemetery in Midway, beside his wife, who predeceased him by twelve years, aged 33.
