= NOAAS Fairweather =

US Research and hydrographic survey ship based in Alaska (1967)

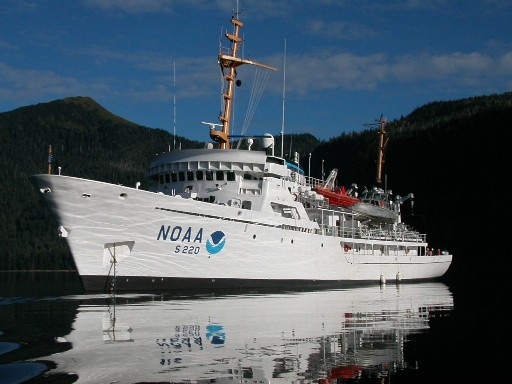
- NOAA Ship Fairweather (S 220)

History

United States
- Name: USC&GS Fairweather (MSS 20)
- Namesake: Mount Fairweather in Alaska
- Builder: Aerojet-General Shipyards, Jacksonville, Florida
- Laid down: 12 August 1963
- Launched: 15 March 1967
- Acquired: January 1968
- Commissioned: 2 October 1968
- Fate: Transferred to National Oceanic and Atmospheric Administration 3 October 1970

United States
- Name: NOAAS Fairweather (S 220)
- Namesake: Previous name retained
- Acquired: Transferred from U.S. Coast and Geodetic Survey 3 October 1970
- Decommissioned: 1989 (set for 2027-2028)
- Recommissioned: August 2004
- Home port: Ketchikan, Alaska
- Identification: IMO number: 6710920; MMSI number: 369960000; Callsign: WTEB
- Status: Active

General characteristics
- Class & type: Fairweather-class oceanographic research ship
- Type: S1-MT-63a
- Tonnage: 1,591 tons
- Displacement: 1,800 tons
- Length: 231 ft (70.4 m)
- Beam: 42 ft (12.8 m)
- Draft: 15.5 ft (4.7 m)
- Ice class: A1 ice strengthened
- Propulsion: 2 Electro-Motive Diesel engines, twin screw, controllable pitch propellers, 2400 shp; Bow Thruster (variable pitch); Bridge Wing Controls (Engines, and Thruster) Port and Stbd
- Speed: 12.5 knots
- Range: 6,000 nautical miles
- Endurance: 22 days
- Boats & landing craft carried: Four 28ft All-American Marine survey launches, One 23ft Zodiac FRB, One 23ft AMBAR Jet Boat, One 18ft Aluminum Skiff
- Complement: Commissioned Officers: 15; Licensed Engineers: 4; Crew: 35; Hydrographic Survey Technician s: 6 (Max)
- Sensors & processing systems: 4 Kongsberg EM2040 Multibeam, 1 Kongsberg EM712 Multibeam, 4 Edgetech Side Scan Sonar, 4 Klien Side Scan Sonar, 1 Moving Vessel Profiler, 5 SeaBird CTD
- Armament: Formerly Five 12 Gauge Shot Guns, Currently 10 Cans of High Powered Bear Spray
- Aircraft carried: 5 Drones

NOAA Ship Fairweather (S 220), originally operated by the United States Coast and Geodetic Survey as USC&GS Fairweather (MSS 20), is an oceanographic research ship operated by the National Oceanic and Atmospheric Administration (NOAA). Fairweather primarily conducts hydrographic surveys in Alaskan waters, but is considered a multi-mission-capable vessel and has conducted fisheries research cruises and oceanographic buoy deployments and recoveries. She is the sister ship of the NOAAS Rainier (S 221) and of the retired NOAAS Mount Mitchell (S 222).

== Overview ==
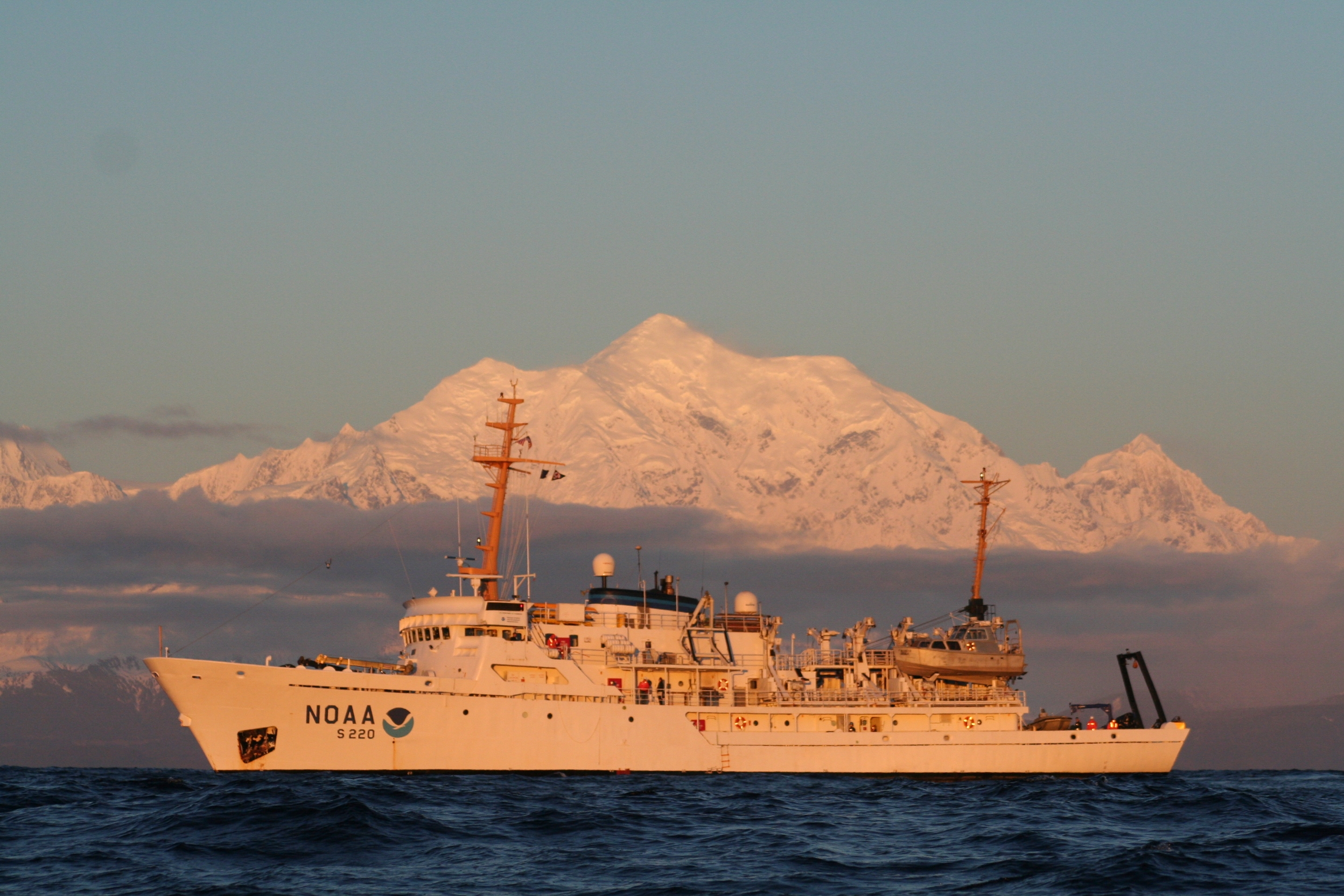
NOAAS Fairweather (S 220) in Alaskan waters with Mount Fairweather in the background.

Fairweather is named for Mount Fairweather in Alaska. She was constructed for the U.S. Coast and Geodetic Survey as a "medium survey ship" (MSS) by Aerojet-General Shipyards at Jacksonville, Florida. She was laid down on 12 August 1963 and launched on 15 March 1967. The Coast and Geodetic Survey commissioned her as USC&GS Fairweather (MSS 20) in a joint ceremony with her sister ship USC&GS Rainier (MSS 21) at the Pacific Marine Center in Seattle, Washington, on 2 October 1968. When NOAA was established on 3 October 1970 and took over the Coast and Geodetic Survey's assets, she became part of the NOAA fleet as NOAAS Fairweather (S 220). Deactivated in 1989, the ship remained inactive at NOAA's Pacific Marine Center in Seattle for thirteen years. In 2002, she began a refit at the Cascade General Shipyard in Portland, Oregon, and she was recommissioned in 2004 to aid with the backlog of critical surveys in Alaskan waters. In 2008 her home port pier was condemned by NOAA. In 2023 the pier was reopened. Her home port is Ketchikan, Alaska.

== Crew ==
Fairweather, like all NOAA ships, is operated by commissioned officers of the NOAA Corps and civilian wage mariners. Fairweather was originally complemented for a crew of 69 people, with additional berthing capability for visitors and scientists. Now the ship is complimented at 45 people. In 2022 the Chief Engineer (CME) became the youngest person to make CME in NOAA history. The ship generally spends over 150 days per year at sea.

== Equipment and mission ==
Fairweather has a Kongsberg Gruppen EM712 multibeam echosounder. Her four survey launches have Kongsberg EM2040 multibeam echosounders. In addition, Fairweather can tow an L3/Klein System 5000 sidescan sonar, and her launches can be equipped with additional hull-mounted L3/Klein System 5000 sidescan sonars. These sidescan sonars are used for near-shore Arctic survey operations. Additionally, Fairweather's personnel routinely establish horizontal and vertical control instruments, such as Global Positioning System (GPS) base stations and tide-level measuring devices, in the remote areas in which the ship works. Using this technology, the crew of Fairweather can map the ocean floor fully. These data are primarily used to update NOAA's nautical charts, but are increasingly used in other areas such as tsunami displacement modeling, flood mapping, and the mapping of fish habitats.

== Service history ==
On 30 April and 1 May 2017, the NOAA research ship NOAAS Oscar Dyson (R 224) surveyed an area in the Bering Sea off Dalnoi Point on the northwestern tip of St. George Island in the Pribilof Islands in a search for the wreck of the 92-foot (28-meter) crab-fishing boat Destination, which had capsized and sunk in the area with the loss of her entire crew of six men on 11 February 2017. She did not find the wreck, but her survey narrowed the search area for Fairweather, which discovered the wreck in about 250 feet (76 meters) of water during a survey on 8 and 9 July 2017.

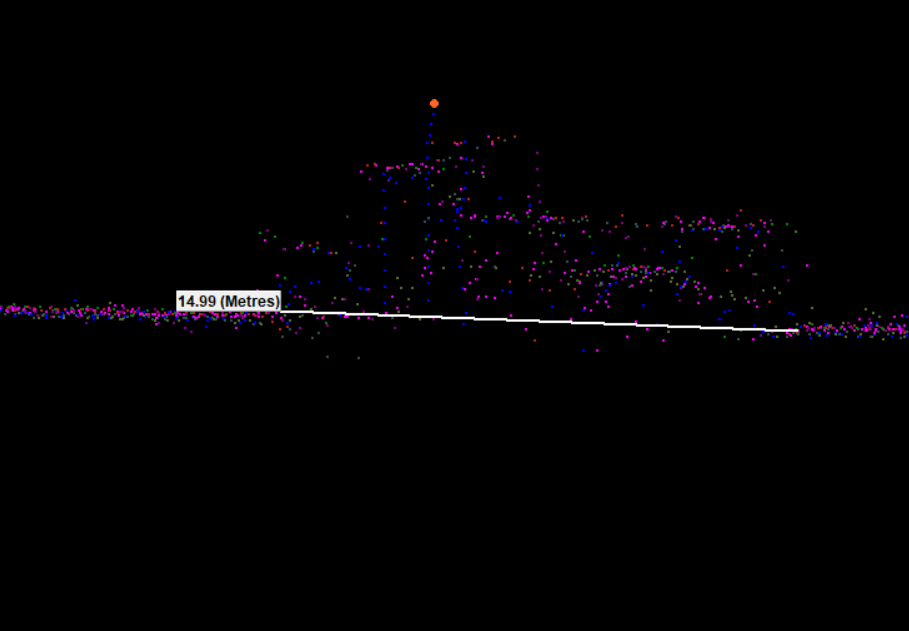
A multibeam sonar image of what probably is the wreck of Wind Walker off Point Couverden, Alaska, generated by NOAAS Fairweather. in the spring of 2025.

On 1 December 2024, the 52-foot (16-meter) fishing vessel Wind Walker sent out a mayday call reporting that she was overturning in a snowstorm off Point Couverden (58.1906°N 135.0556°W) in the Alexander Archipelago in Southeast Alaska at the confluence of Icy Strait and Lynn Canal. She subsequently sank, leaving her entire crew of five missing. During its investigation of the accident, the United States Coast Guard — which had a general idea of where Wind Walker sank based on a search conducted by the icebreaker USCGC Healy (WAGB-20) — asked NOAA to conduct a survey to find the wreck of Wind Walker. In the spring of 2025, Fairweather surveyed the area and found what probably was the wreck's precise location on the seabed at a depth of 14.99 meters (49 feet).
