= LeConte Memorial Lodge =

- Yosemite Conservation Heritage Center - LeConte Memorial Lodge
- U.S. National Register of Historic Places
- U.S. National Historic Landmark
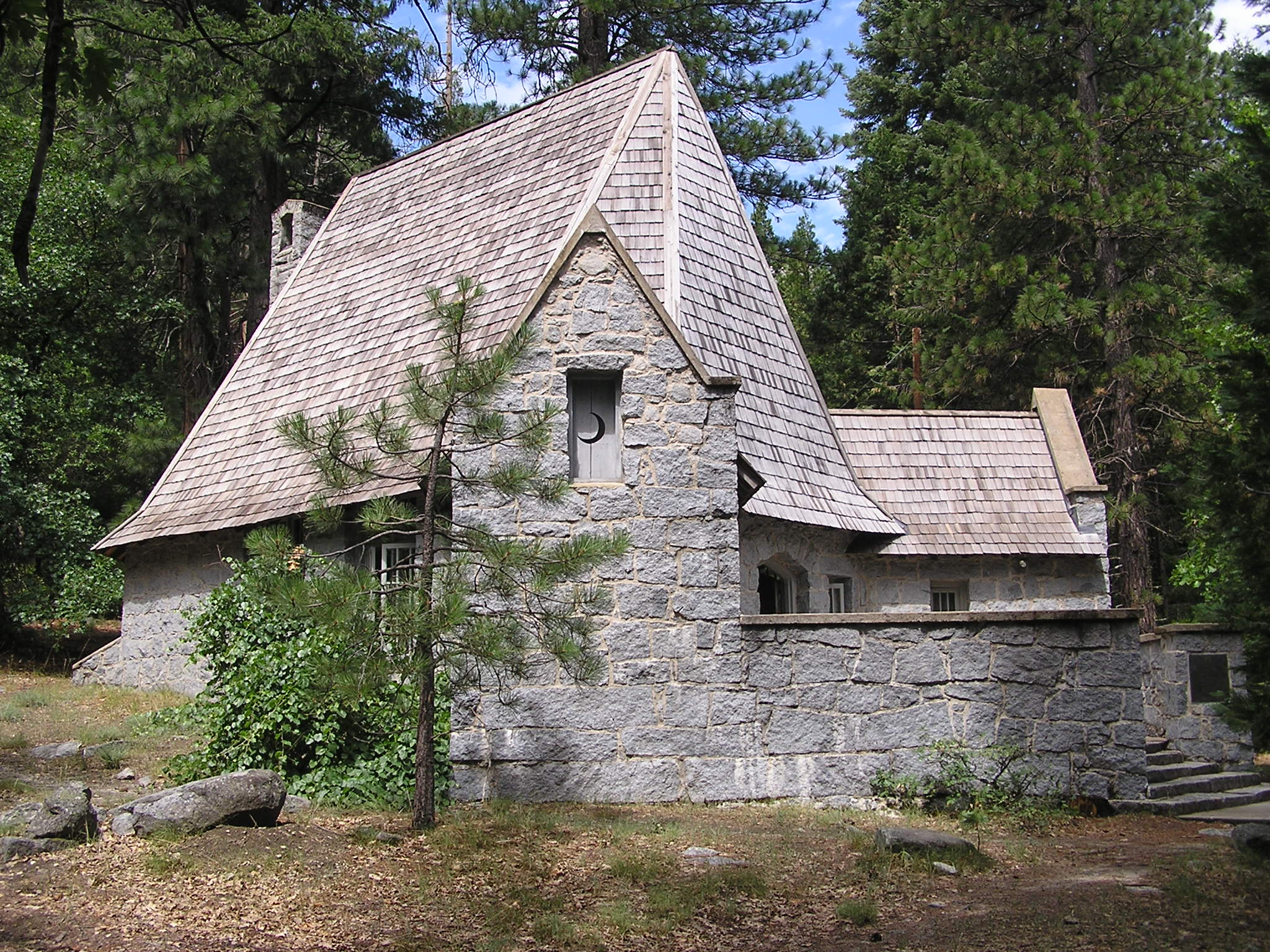
- Exterior of the LeConte Memorial Lodge

- Location within California Location within the United States
- Location: Curry Village, California
- Coordinates: 37°44′24.39″N 119°34′42.32″W
- Area: less than one acre
- Built: 1903
- Architect: John White
- Architectural style: Tudor Revival
- NRHP reference No.: 77000148

Significant dates
- Added to NRHP: March 8, 1977
- Designated NHL: May 28, 1987

The LeConte Memorial Lodge, now known as the Yosemite Conservation Heritage Center, is a structure in Yosemite National Park in California, United States. LeConte is spelled variously as Le Conte or as Leconte. Built in 1903 by the Sierra Club, it is nearly unique within the National Park Service system as a high-quality example of Tudor Revival architecture, and is an important early expression of the Club's mission. The lodge was declared a National Historic Landmark in 1987.

== History ==
The LeConte Memorial Lodge was built by the Sierra Club in 1903 in memory of Joseph LeConte, one of the founding members of the Sierra Club, who died in 1901. The US$4,500 cost to build the Lodge was contributed by students, alumni and faculty from the University of California and Stanford University, San Francisco businesses, and friends and relatives of LeConte. The Sierra Club levied a $1.00 assessment on each of its members to help raise the funds.

The Lodge was constructed at the base of Glacier Point in Curry Village and was dedicated on July 3, 1904. In 1919, the lodge was moved west in the Yosemite Valley to its current location across from Housekeeping Camp. For four years from 1920, Ansel Adams served as the lodge's summer custodian.

In 2016 the lodge was renamed "Yosemite Conservation Heritage Center" at the request of the Sierra Club, after consideration of writings by Joseph LeConte about white superiority.

== Design ==
Architect John White designed the Lodge. The design was influenced by his brother-in-law, Bernard Maybeck. White's design reflected the vertical nature, color and texture of Yosemite Valley by featuring a steep, pitched roof, rough-hewn granite stone walls and exposed beams.

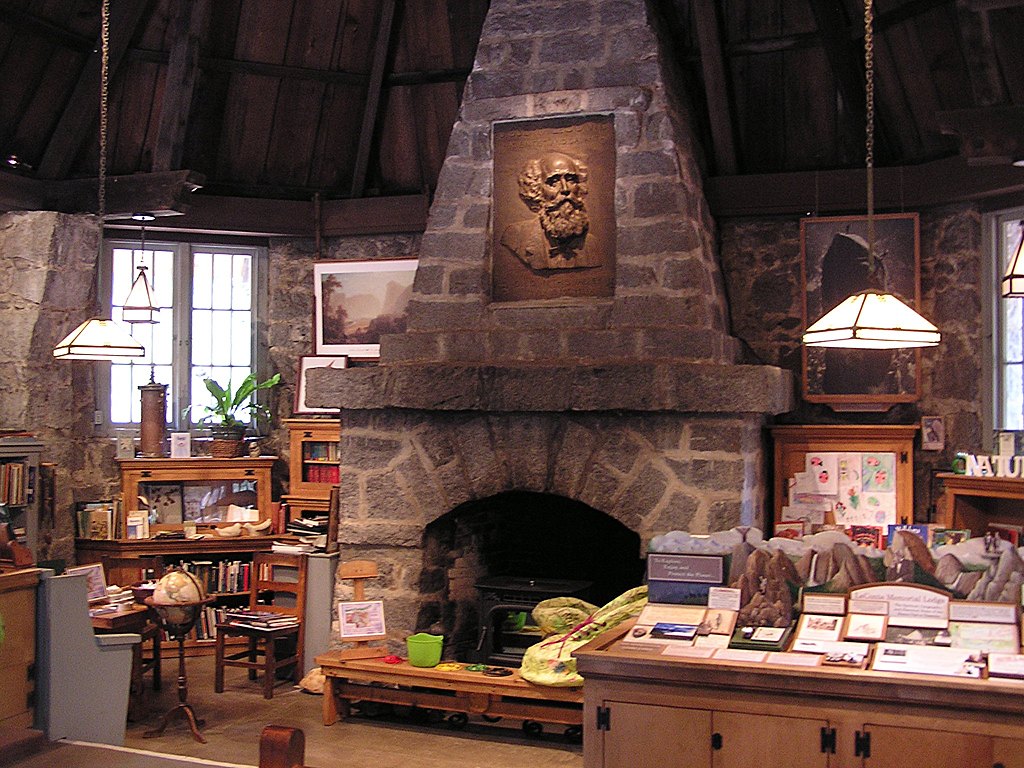
Interior of the Lodge. A bas-relief of Joseph LeConte is over the fireplace.

The lodge's initial construction predates the National Park Service's later emphasis on rustic construction, and marks a transition from formal European design prototypes to a design philosophy more aligned with locale and native building materials. The Lodge served as the first visitors center in Yosemite Valley. Today, the Center is owned by the National Park Service and is operated by the Sierra Club as a conservation and natural history library, with a children's library and with exhibits on the Sierra Club and Yosemite National Park, and serves as a lecture hall providing evening programs on weekends from May through September.

== Description ==
The Tudor Revival lodge is built of rough-shaped granite in a rough-coursed ashlar pattern, unlike most stone park structures which were built using rubble coursing. The Y-shaped building, set at the base of a cliff, is entered by a small porch at the center of the Y. A steeply pitched gable roof is defined at the ends with parapets. The small wings have substantially lower height. The roof is supported by exposed hammer beams that in turn support scissors trusses. The interior is divided into three rooms, with a main meeting room in the base of the Y and two smaller rooms in the angled arms. The main meeting room has two levels, with an intimate lower section next to the fireplace opposite the entrance.

Despite the "lodge" in its original name, the Yosemite Conservation Heritage Center does not provide accommodations. Open from May 1 through September 30, Wednesday through Sunday, from 10 am until 4:00, the Sierra Club, its curator, and staff of volunteers welcome all visitors to Yosemite National Park.
