= W. T. Reid =

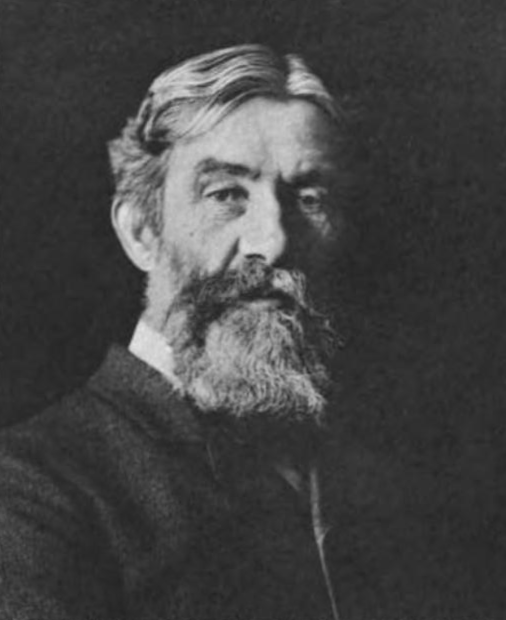
- c. 1908
- Born: William Thomas Reid; November 8, 1843; Jacksonville, Illinois
- Died: December 17, 1922 (aged 79); Berkeley, California
- Education: Harvard University
- Occupation: Educator
- Spouse: Julia Reed (m. 1870)

William Thomas Reid (November 8, 1843 – December 17, 1922) was an American educator who served as the fourth president of the University of California from 1881 to 1885.

== Early life ==
Reid was born on November 8, 1843, on a farm outside Jacksonville, Illinois. He entered Illinois College in 1859 but left in 1861 to join the Union Army. He served until the end of the war as a member of the 68th Illinois Infantry Regiment and later as the commander of the prison camp in Alexandria, Virginia. He graduated from Harvard College in 1868 and Harvard University in 1872. On August 16, 1870, he married Julia Reed in Jacksonville, Illinois.

== Career ==
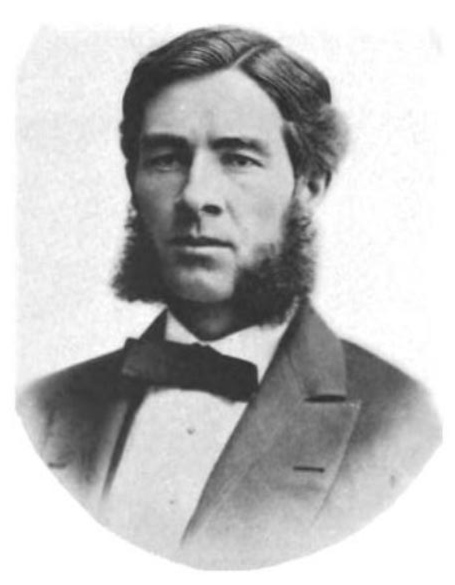
At Harvard, c. 1868

From 1868 to 1871, Reid was the headmaster of Newport High School in Newport, Rhode Island. He then served as first assistant to the headmaster of the Boston Latin School. From 1873 to 1875 he was the superintendent of schools in Brookline, Massachusetts.

In 1875, Reid moved to California, where he served as the headmaster of the Boys' High School in San Francisco. From 1881 to 1885, Reid was president of the University of California. Soon after Reid took office, written entrance examinations replaced oral tests and the scope of the examinations for literary and science courses were expanded. Examinations were in Los Angeles and Marysville, California, so students could take the tests without having to travel all the way to Berkeley, California. During Reid's tenure, the University hired noted professors George Herbert Palmer and Josiah Royce. In 1885, Reid founded the Belmont School in Belmont, California. In 1893 it merged with the Hopkins Academy to form the Belmont School, W. T. Reid Foundation. He retired in 1918.

== Death ==
Reid died at his home in Berkeley on December 17, 1922. He was survived by his son, Harvard football coach William Thomas Reid Jr.

Academic offices
Preceded by John Le Conte	President of the University of California; 1881–1885	Succeeded by Edward S. Holden
