= Bill Reid (American football coach) =

American football player and coach (1878–1976)

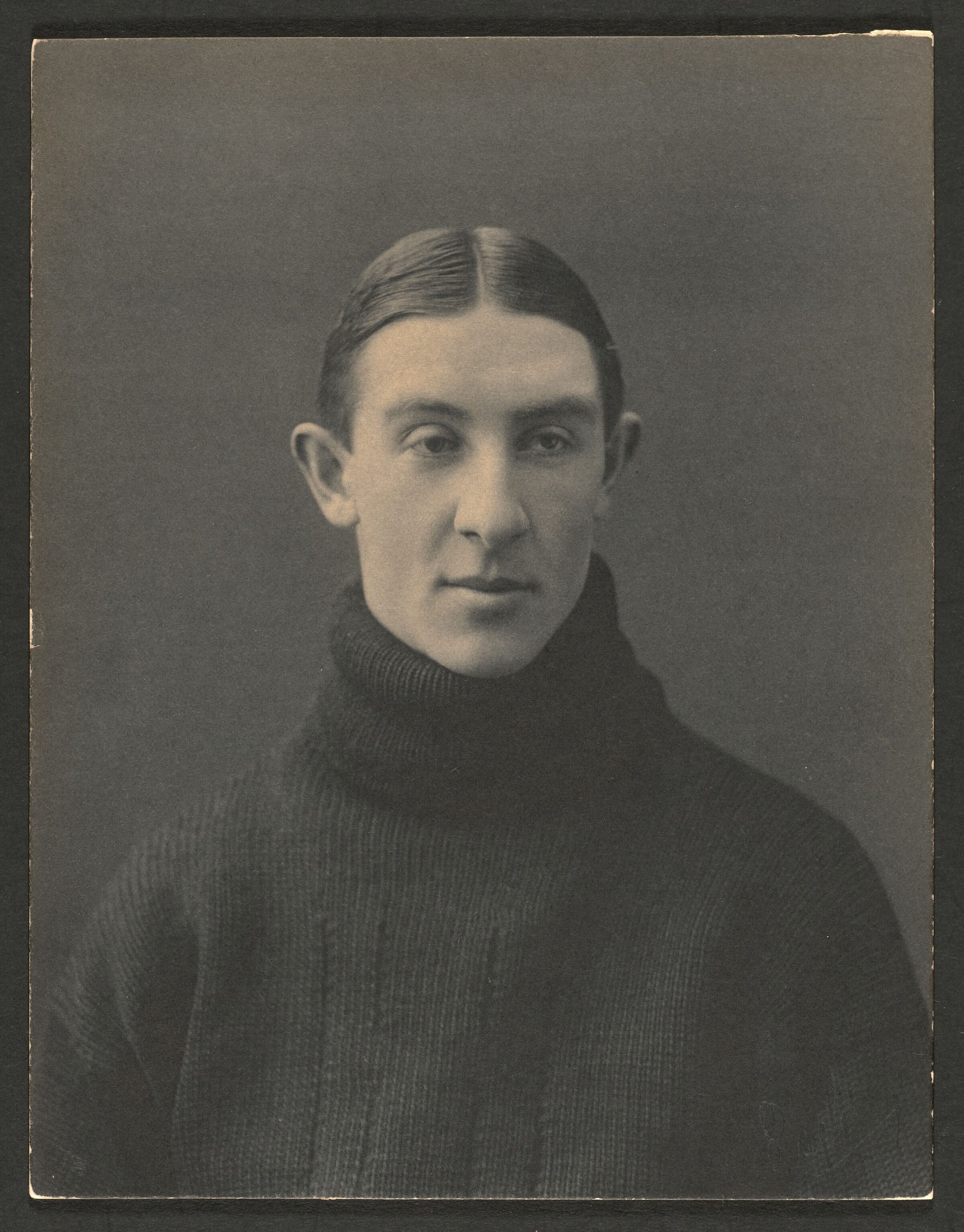
- Pach Brothers portrait, circa 1901.

Biographical details
- Born: October 25, 1878; San Francisco, California, U.S.
- Died: September 28, 1976 (aged 97); Brookline, Massachusetts, U.S.

Playing career
- 1898–1899: Harvard
- Position: Fullback

Coaching career (HC unless noted)
- 1901: Harvard
- 1905–1906: Harvard

Head coaching record
- Overall: 30–3–1

Accomplishments and honors

Championships
- 1 national (1901)
- College Football Hall of Fame; Inducted in 1970 (profile)

William Thomas Reid Jr. (October 25, 1878 – September 28, 1976) was an American football player and coach of Harvard's football team for the 1901, 1905, and 1906 seasons. Though his goal was to produce winning teams, mounting injuries and intensifying criticism of the game fueled demands for its abolition and pressured Reid into a leadership role in the momentous 1906 rule changes which defused this threat. He was elected to the College Football Hall of Fame in 1970.

== Early life and playing career ==
Reid was born and raised in the San Francisco Bay area, where his father, W. T. Reid, was the head of a prep school. When he decided to attend Harvard University, he exhibited such athletic promise that he was actively recruited by both the football and baseball teams. He immediately proved himself to be an outstanding baseball catcher, starting his freshman year and then serving as captain of the university's championship teams his junior and senior years. In football, he started at fullback his sophomore year and scored two touchdowns in Harvard's momentous 1898 victory over Yale, its first since the initial meeting of the teams in 1875. Though injuries constrained his involvement with football over the following two seasons, the Boston Transcript later characterized him, in its account of his wedding, as "one of the best athletes that ever came out [of Harvard]."

== Harvard football coach ==
Following his graduation, Reid was appointed student coach of the football team, a long-standing practice whereby early teams selected a graduate player from the previous season to be its coach. Reid's 1901 team went undefeated and crushed Yale 22–0 in its final game. Afterwards, Reid accepted a teaching position at his father's school in order to provide financial support for his wife and family.

Ensuing losses, especially ones to Yale, convinced the team and Harvard's Athletic Committee to dispense with student-amateur coaches in 1905 and to raise enough money to hire Reid, making him one of the game's first professional coaches. The conscientiousness with which Reid shouldered these responsibilities is reflected in his lengthy catalogues of notes. He devised both a weight training program and a special meal table. He improved equipment to reduce injuries and devised better treatment for them. He appointed a large staff of assistants so that every position got special instruction. Finally he made a concerted effort to turn his players into good students.

=== Gradual conversion to the cause of reform ===
Reid also crafted his team's schedule so that its initial games were against weak opponents that gained the team easy victories and opportunities for improvement. However, off-field developments soon revealed that the fall of 1905 would not be a normal season. Several articles in major magazines complained about the rising number of injuries, the huge amounts of money pouring into the game, and widespread recruiting abuses. By October, President Theodore Roosevelt was sufficiently concerned about these criticisms that he summoned the coaches of the big three—Harvard, Yale, and Princeton—to a White House discussion of the situation and insisted that they sign an accord "to carry out in letter and in spirit the rules of the game." Several weeks later, Reid learned that Charles Elliot, the President of Harvard, was urging his Board of Overseers to abolish football. Deciding that he needed to act, Reid gathered several supporters and drafted a public release to newspapers advocating that current rules of football be radically changed.

Reid was hoping that the season's end would quell these complaints and bring him a much needed rest, but it did not. Harvard lost its final game to Yale 6–0, the lone score coming late in the fourth quarter. This devastating loss infused a second quarter incident with a significance a Harvard victory would have trivialized. When a Harvard player fielded a punt, he was immediately hit high and low by two Yale tacklers, and fans attending the Cambridge event thought a penalty should have been called for unnecessary roughness. The Boston Globe exacerbated this belief with a front-page photograph of the controversial catch and an accompanying account which editorialized that the hit "was certainly an instance of unnecessary roughness," despite its accompanying interview of Paul Dashiell, the head referee, who explained that a fair catch had never been signaled. Also on its front page that same day, the Globe reported that a Union College player had been killed in another game.

=== Path to new rules ===
The overlap of these developments produced a full-blown storm. The president of Columbia and his faculty voted to end its football program. The Chancellor of New York University proposed a meeting of representatives from colleges excluded from the big three's Intercollegiate Football Association to discuss the future of football. Meanwhile, Roosevelt summoned Reid to Washington to update him on matters since their previous meeting. The coach informed the President that Walter Camp, the architect of Yale's indomitable teams, opposed change and maintained control over IFA's rule committee via an alliance with Dashiell, who was a prominent member of the rule committee and was then on the faculty of the U.S.Naval Academy. The pair roughed out a strategy whereby Reid would meet with Harvard colleagues to complete a set of new rules and Roosevelt would pressure Dashiell into supporting them. This strategy was successfully implemented at a momentous, unanticipated amalgamation of the IFA and the fledgling alternative, a consolidation that originated today's NCAA. Reid pressured this consolidation by threatening to defect from the IFA to the new organization in order to accomplish substantial rule change. Harvard's Board of Overseers, strongly influenced by President Eliot, supported Reid's agenda with a vote to abolish its football team unless major reform was achieved.

Ensuing approval of most of Reid's nineteen proposed changes included establishment of a "neutral zone" between the offensive and defensive lines. The offense was henceforth required to keep at least six men on the line of scrimmage and to make ten yards (rather than five) for a first down. The forward pass was legalized, though this revolutionary modification was delayed by an accompanying penalty for an incompletion.

=== Subsequent career ===
Reid craftily sought to confine his reform agenda to play itself. He especially did not want any alteration to the current eligibility of graduate students because he had been resourcefully capitalizing on Harvard's prestigious graduate schools to recruit older students whom he believed to be superior players. However, without apprising Reid of their intent, administrators from Harvard and Yale forged an agreement that banned graduate students from play. After all his work on behalf of reform, Reid felt betrayed and decided, even before it started, the following season would be his last. He produced another outstanding team that went undefeated until the final game against Yale and again lost 6–0. Afterward, Reid returned to teaching at his father's school. He soon moved back to Massachusetts to sell bonds for Dillon, Read & Co. He was active in local politics in Brookline, Massachusetts, serving on the town's school committee for many years including a stint as chairman from 1933 to 1936.

== Head coaching record ==
Year	Team	Overall	Conference	Standing	Bowl/playoffs
Harvard Crimson (Independent) (1901)
1901	Harvard	12–0			
Harvard Crimson (Independent) (1905–1906)
1905	Harvard	8–2–1			
1906	Harvard	10–1			
Harvard:		30–3–1			
Total:		30–3–1			
National championship Conference title Conference division title or championship game berth
