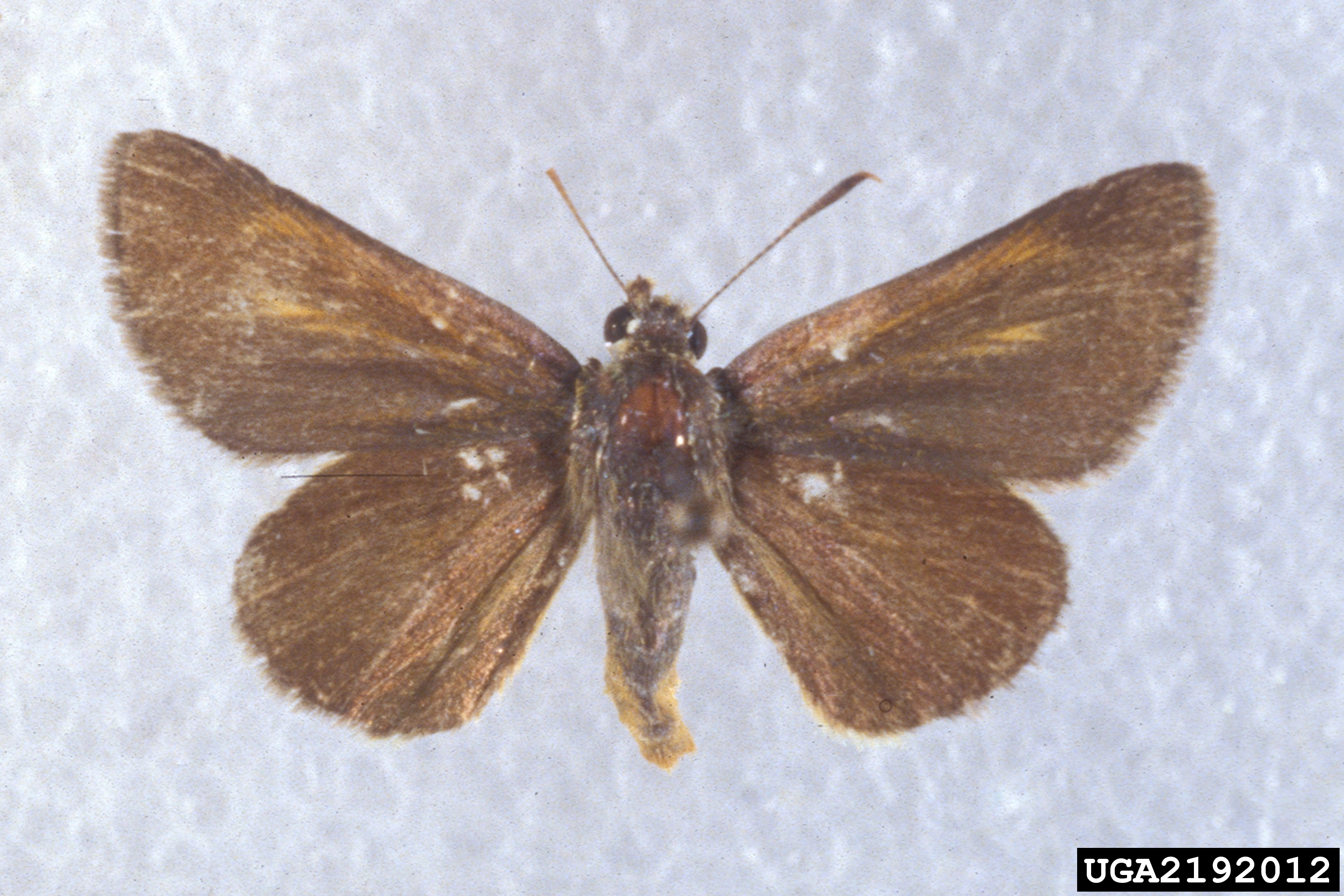
- Atrytone arogos

Scientific classification
- Kingdom: Animalia
- Phylum: Arthropoda
- Class: Insecta
- Order: Lepidoptera
- Family: Hesperiidae
- Tribe: Hesperiini
- Genus: Atrytone; Scudder, 1872

= Atrytone =

Genus of butterflies

Atrytone is a genus of skippers in the family Hesperiidae.

== Species ==
- Atrytone arogos (Boisduval & Le Conte, [1834])

=== Former species ===
- Atrytone monticola Godman, [1900] - transferred to Lon monticola (Godman, [1900])
- Atrytone potesta Bell, 1941 - transferred to Testia potesta (Bell, 1941)
