= NOAAS Rainier =

Medium survey ship based in Newport, Oregon (USA)

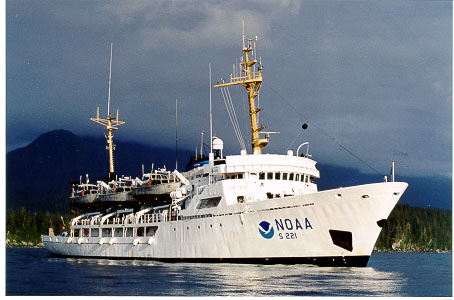
- NOAAS Rainier (S 221)

History

United States Coast and Geodetic Survey
- Name: USC&GS Rainier
- Namesake: Mount Rainier in Washington
- Builder: Aerojet-General Shipyards, Jacksonville, Florida
- Launched: March 1967
- Sponsored by: Mrs. Robert M. White
- Commissioned: 2 October 1968
- Identification: (MSS 21)
- Fate: Transferred to National Oceanic and Atmospheric Administration 3 October 1970

National Oceanic and Atmospheric Administration
- Name: NOAAS Rainier
- Namesake: Previous name retained
- Acquired: Transferred from U.S. Coast and Geodetic Survey 3 October 1970
- Home port: Newport, Oregon
- Identification: IMO number: 6711003; MMSI number: 303935000; Callsign: WTEF; Hull number: (S 221)
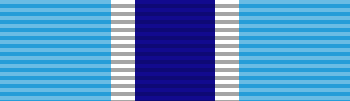
- Honors and awards: NOAA Unit Citation Award, 1977
- Status: Active

General characteristics
- Class & type: Fairweather-class hydrographic survey ship
- Tonnage: 1,591 GRT; 578 NRT
- Displacement: 1,800 tons
- Length: 231 ft (70 m)
- Beam: 42 ft (13 m) moulded
- Draft: 14.3 ft (4.4 m) maximum
- Installed power: 2,400 shp (1.8 MW)
- Propulsion: Two 1,200 hp (0.89 MW) General Motors 567C diesel engines
- Speed: 12 knots (22 km/h)
- Range: 5,898 nautical miles (10,923 km)
- Endurance: 22 days
- Boats & landing craft carried: Four survey launches, and four smaller boats
- Complement: Maximum of 55 crew and 8 scientists

NOAA Ship Rainier (S 221) is a survey vessel in commission with the National Oceanic and Atmospheric Administration (NOAA). Her primary mission is to chart all aspects of the ocean and sea floor, primarily in Alaska and the Pacific Northwest. The ship is home-ported at the NOAA Marine Operations Center–Pacific in Newport, Oregon. She is named for Mount Rainier in Washington State.

== Construction and characteristics ==
Rainier was designed as a "medium survey ship" (MSS) by the U.S. Maritime Administration. She was built for the United States Coast and Geodetic Survey at the Aerojet-General Shipyards in Jacksonville, Florida. She was launched on 15 March 1967 along with her sister ship USC&GS Fairweather. The principal speaker at the ceremony was Dr. J. Herbert Hollomon, acting United States Under Secretary of Commerce. The ship was christened by Mrs. Robert M. White, wife of the administrator of the Environmental Science Services Administration. The ship's original cost was reported to be US$4 million.

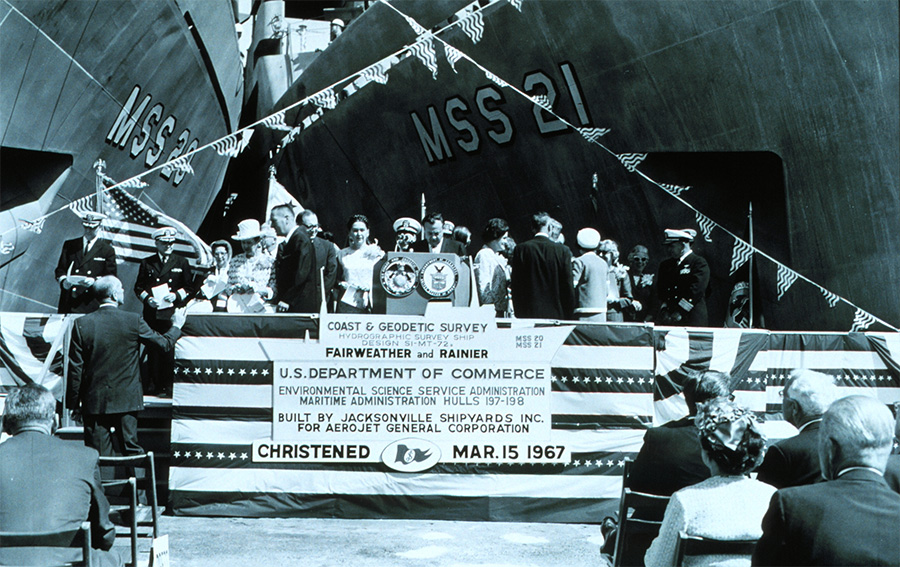
Christening of USC&GS Fairweather and Rainier in 1967

Rainier was delivered to the Coast and Geodetic Survey in April 1968, and commissioned on 2 October 1968 as USC&GS Rainier (MSS 21) in a joint ceremony with her sister ship USC&GS Fairweather at the Pacific Marine Center in Seattle, Washington. The principal speaker at the ceremony was Senator Warren G. Magnuson. When NOAA was formed on 3 October 1970 and took over the Coast and Geodetic Survey's assets, she became a part of the NOAA fleet as NOAAS Rainier (S 221).

Rainier's hull is constructed of welded steel plates. She is 231 feet (70 m) long, with a beam of 42 feet (13 m), and a draft of 14.3 feet (4.4 m) She displaces 1,800 tons. Her registered tonnage is 1,591 gross and 578 net. Her construction complies with the standards of the American Bureau of Shipping.

Rainier can cruise at 12 knots. She is propelled by two three-bladed controllable-pitch propellers which are 8.5 feet (2.6 m) in diameter. These are driven by two diesel engines. The two main propulsion engines are General Motors EMD LR-12-567-C, each of which produces 1,200 shaft horsepower. Electric power on board is provided by two diesel generators, each of which is capable of producing 300 kW. The generators are powered by MTU/Detroit Diesel 12V2000P82 engines. She also has a 75 kW emergency generator. The ship has a 200 horsepower bow thruster for improved maneuverability.

The ship's tanks hold 107,000 US gallons (410,000 L) for diesel fuel, giving Rainier an unrefueled range of 5,898 nautical miles.

Rainier has 14 single-person staterooms, 13 double staterooms, and 6 four-person bunk rooms, giving her a total berthing capacity of 64. The ship is equipped with an officers' wardroom, officer's mess, technician's mess, crew mess, galley, gym, laundry facilities, and an infirmary. Rainier has a laboratory of 240 square feet (22 m^{2}) to support oceanographic observations and diving operations.

The deck equipment features a large crane aft and two bow-mounted fixed cranes. This equipment gives Rainier a lifting capacity of up to 5,000 pounds (2,300 kg). She originally had an A-frame aft, but it was removed during a major refit in 2010 in favor of a Rolls-Royce Group ODIM Brooke Ocean MVP200 Moving Vessel Profiler for underway sound velocity determination during mapping missions.

She carries a Kongsberg hull-mounted EM2040 and EM304 multibeam sonar, and a variety of other conductivity, temperature, and water and bottom sampling instruments to map and characterize the ocean.

The ship carries four survey launches for shallow water work. They were built by All American Marine at its Bellingham, Washington shipyard. They are constructed of welded aluminum. The launches are 28 feet (8.5 m) long. They can cruise at 24 knots driven by a single propeller powered by a Cummins QSC 8.3 liter 490-hp Diesel engine. Each of these survey launches is equipped with a Kongsberg EM2040 multibeam sonar for mapping purposes. Rainier also carries four other smaller boats to support dive operations and shore operations.

Rainier's crew varies with her mission, but her maximum complement is 13 NOAA Corps commissioned officers/mates, 4 United States Coast Guard licensed engineers, 6 unlicensed engineers, 16 deckhands, 10 survey crew, 4 stewards, 1 electronics technician, and 1 maintenance person, plus up to 8 scientists.

== Operational history ==
Rainier's career began somewhat inauspiciously. While she was delivered to USC&GS in April 1968, she was not placed into commission until October because Congress had failed to appropriate funds to operate the ship. Since that time, however, she has been at sea almost every year. The table below, while incomplete, gives a sense of her work.

Year	Survey Area	Notes
1969	Caribbean Sea	Project BOMEX, the Barbados Oceanographic Meteorological Experiment, was an effort to characterize air-sea interaction.
1970	Bristol Bay	Rainier collected magnetic, gravity, and seismic data in a 24,000 square mile area south of the bay.
1973	Southeast Alaska	
1974	Strait of Juan de Fuca, Admiralty Inlet	
1997	Stevens Passage, Le Conte Bay, Prince William Sound	
1998	Prince William Sound, Lynn Canal	
1999	Prince William Sound, Lynn Canal, Kodiak, Cook Inlet, Yakutat	
2006	Shumagan Islands	
2011	Prince of Wales Island	
2012	Kodiak, Shumagan Islands, Chatham Strait	The Chatham Strait survey was the first since the USC&GS Carlile P. Patterson visited 116 years previously.
2013	Kodiak	
2014	Kodiak	
2015	Kodiak, Bering Strait, Kotzebue Sound	
2016	Kodiak	
2017	Channel Islands, California	
2018	California coast, Tracy Arm, Lisianski Inlet	The Tracy Arm survey included a mile of water that had been covered by the ice of the Sawyer Glacier at the last survey in 1974.
2019	Puna coast, Hawaii Island	Replacement for NOAAS Hi'ialakai . Surveyed changes to the seafloor caused by the eruption of Kilauea.
2021	Glacier Bay National Park	Surveyed 87 square miles of sea floor.
2022	Western Pacific	Conducted mapping and reef surveys around Guam and the Northern Marianas.
2023	Pacific	Conducted 2023 Rainier Integrates Charting, Hydrography, And Reef Demographics (RICHARD) mission off American Samoa and in the Pacific Remote Islands Marine National Monument.

== Significant incidents ==
The fishing vessel Cricket sank in southern Sitka Sound on 10 June 2008. Her two crewmen abandoned ship in survival suits. Rainier rescued them.

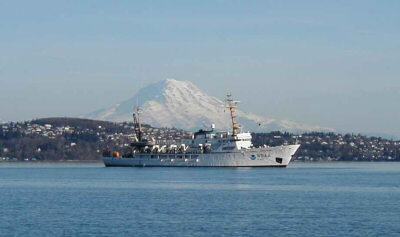
NOAAS Rainier with her namesake, Mount Rainier, in the background.

The ship underwent a service-life extension renovation during 2010. This work took place at the Vigor Marine shipyard in Portland, Oregon, under a $13.1 million contract. Among the work performed was the installation of the Kongsburg multibeam sonar system and the MVP200 Moving Vessel Profiler, replacement of davits and other deck machinery, refitting of living and berthing spaces, and upgrades to machinery control systems, power generation machinery, and the ship’s steering system. Rainier was originally expected to be retired in 2015, but with the additional investment in extending her life, she is now expected to serve until 2028, when she will be 60 years old.

While transiting the Montlake Cut in the Lake Washington Ship Canal in Seattle, Washington, on 16 April 2018, Rainier struck the bottom and a concrete wall. No injuries were reported, but the ship suffered damage to one of her propellers, dents in her hull, and paint scrapes.

During the summer surveying season in 2018, while Rainier was off the Southern California coast, the United States Coast Guard requested that she assist a disabled sailboat. Rainier successfully towed the boat to calm waters.

On 22 March 2018, NOAA hosted a ceremony in Newport, Oregon, to celebrate Rainier′s and her sister ship Fairweather′s 50 years of service.

While in transit to Honolulu, Hawaii, on 5 September 2023, Rainier experienced a fire on board when she was about 200 nautical miles (370 km; 230 mi) off Tutuila in American Samoa with 41 people on board. The fire was caused by a malfunctioning MSD ventilation booster fan in the exhaust stacks above the engine room and affected machinery spaces, the ship's machine shop, and a computer laboratory. The ship, in a remote part of the ocean and not in radio contact with other vessels, was left without propulsion and electrical power for about 23 hours before she was able to proceed under reduced power to Pago Pago, American Samoa, which was the nearest port. There were no reported injuries. After the ship arrived at Pago Pago on 7 September, an investigation into the cause of the fire and an assessment of the ship's condition began, and it became clear that Rainier′s damage was extensive and beyond the repair capability of facilities at Pago Pago. She was towed 2,500 nautical miles (4,630 km; 2,880 mi) to Honolulu, where she arrived on 28 October 2023 for repairs.

== Teacher at Sea Program ==
NOAA sponsors a Teacher at Sea program in its fleet, where primary and secondary school teachers go aboard to participate in the science undertaken by the ships. The intent of the program is to spread awareness of NOAA and ocean sciences generally to teachers who can use this knowledge in their classrooms. Rainier had a Teacher at Sea participant aboard in 2011, 2013, 2014, 2016, 2018, and 2019.

== Honors and awards ==
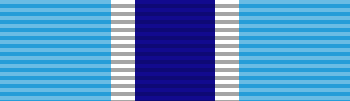
- NOAA Unit Citation Award (1977)
