= Woodmanston Site =

- U.S. National Register of Historic Places
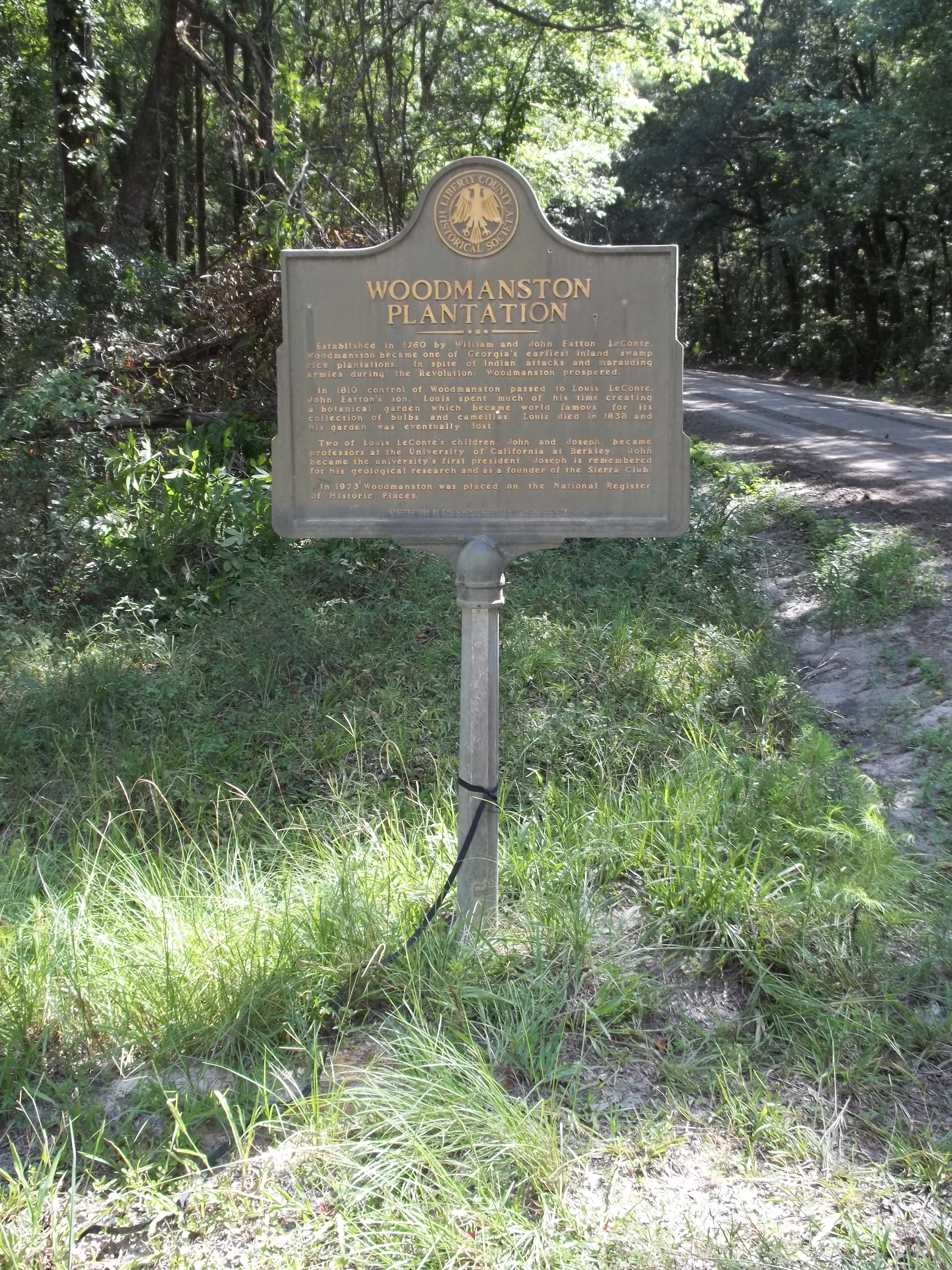

- Location within Georgia Location within the United States
- Location: Southwest of Riceboro, Georgia off Barrington Rd.
- Coordinates: 31.697778°N 81.473056°W
- Area: 93.2 acres (37.7 ha)
- Built: c.1810
- NRHP reference No.: 73000626
- Added to NRHP: June 18, 1973

The Woodmanston Site, located southwest of Riceboro, Georgia off Barrington Road, is a historic site which was listed on the National Register of Historic Places in 1973.

The site is gated but visitors may enter the site by appointment.

Woodmanston was the plantation house of the Le Conte Plantation, or Woodmanston Plantation, a rice plantation started by John Eatton LeConte Sr. The plantation was developed in Bull Town Swamp, a "typical backwater and cypress swamp" which is a tributary to the South Newport River which in turn opens into Sapelo Sound. The site of the house was on a knoll above the tidal area and was, in 1972, still identifiable by the presence of a "few remaining hardwoods, flowering bushes and two palms." LeConte Botanical Gardens were established on the property in 1812, developed by his son Louis, and became internationally known.
