= John LeConte =

American scientist and academic (1818-1891)

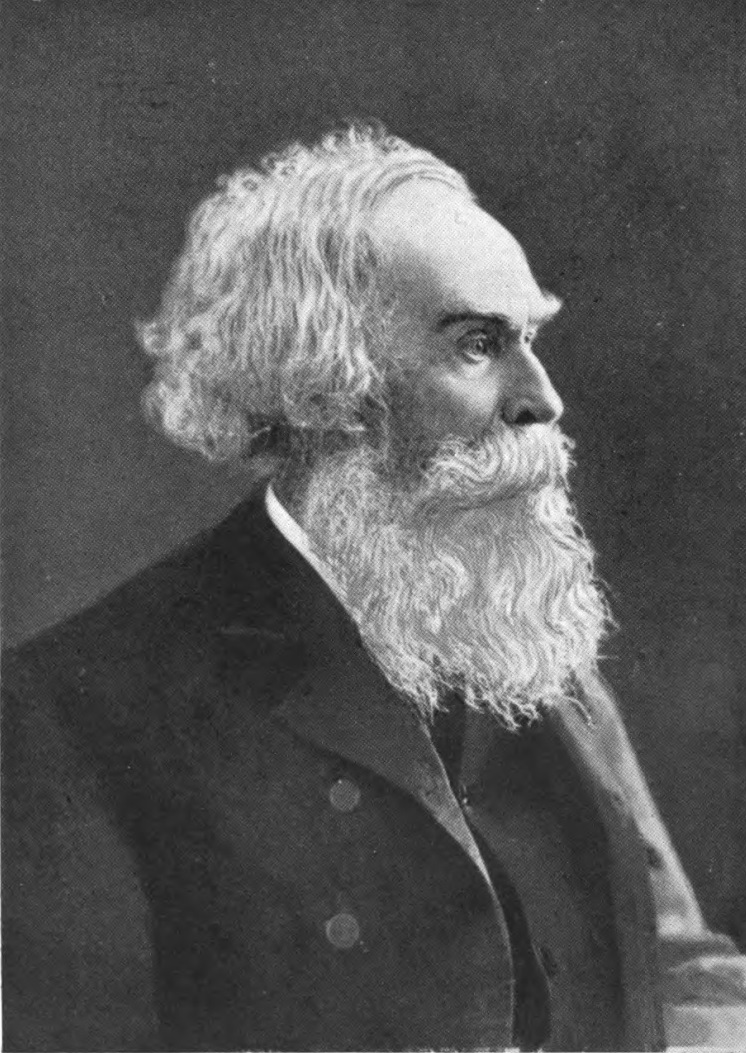
Professor John LeConte

John LeConte (December 4, 1818 – April 29, 1891) was an American scientist and academic. He served as president of the University of California from 1869 to 1870 and from 1875 to 1881.

== Biography ==
LeConte was born in Liberty County, Georgia, to Louis LeConte, patriarch of the noted LeConte family. He attended Franklin College at the University of Georgia where he was a member of the Phi Kappa Literary Society and graduated in 1838. His younger brother Joseph LeConte also attended the university.

Like many of his immediate relatives, LeConte studied medicine at the New York College of Physicians and Surgeons and earned his M.D. in 1842. During this time, LeConte married Eleanor Josephine Graham. He practiced medicine until 1846 when he returned to the University of Georgia as a professor of physics and chemistry and taught there until 1855. His next academic position was at the University of South Carolina as professor of physics and chemistry from 1856 until 1869.

In March 1869, he moved to Oakland, California, to join the faculty of the newly established University of California as a professor of physics. In June 1869, he was appointed acting president of the university, serving until Henry Durant became the president in 1870. In September 1869, his brother Joseph arrived in California to join the faculty of the university as a professor of geology. LeConte was elected as a member to the American Philosophical Society in 1873 and the National Academy of Sciences in 1878. LeConte was appointed acting president of the university a second time until June 1876, when he was elected president. In 1881 LeConte tendered his resignation as president of the university, asking to be returned to his faculty position.

LeConte died at his home in Berkeley on April 29, 1891, while still active as a professor of physics.

== Legacy ==
LeConte contributed major discoveries to physics throughout the 19th century. In 1858, he demonstrated that flames are sensitive to sound, and in 1864, LeConte successfully measured the speed of sound. LeConte began studying underwater vibrations in 1882.

LeConte's younger brother, Joseph, was a white supremacist, and a building named in their honour at UC Berkeley was renamed, as announced on July 7, 2020, because of Joseph's vigorous white supremacy writings in that regard.

LeConte Avenue in Westwood, Los Angeles, which is an east/west street, is located to the south entrance to the UCLA campus.

Academic offices
Preceded by Daniel Coit Gilman	President of the University of California; 1876–1881	Succeeded by W.T. Reid
