= Housekeeping Camp =

Coordinates: 37°44.485′N 119°34.805′W

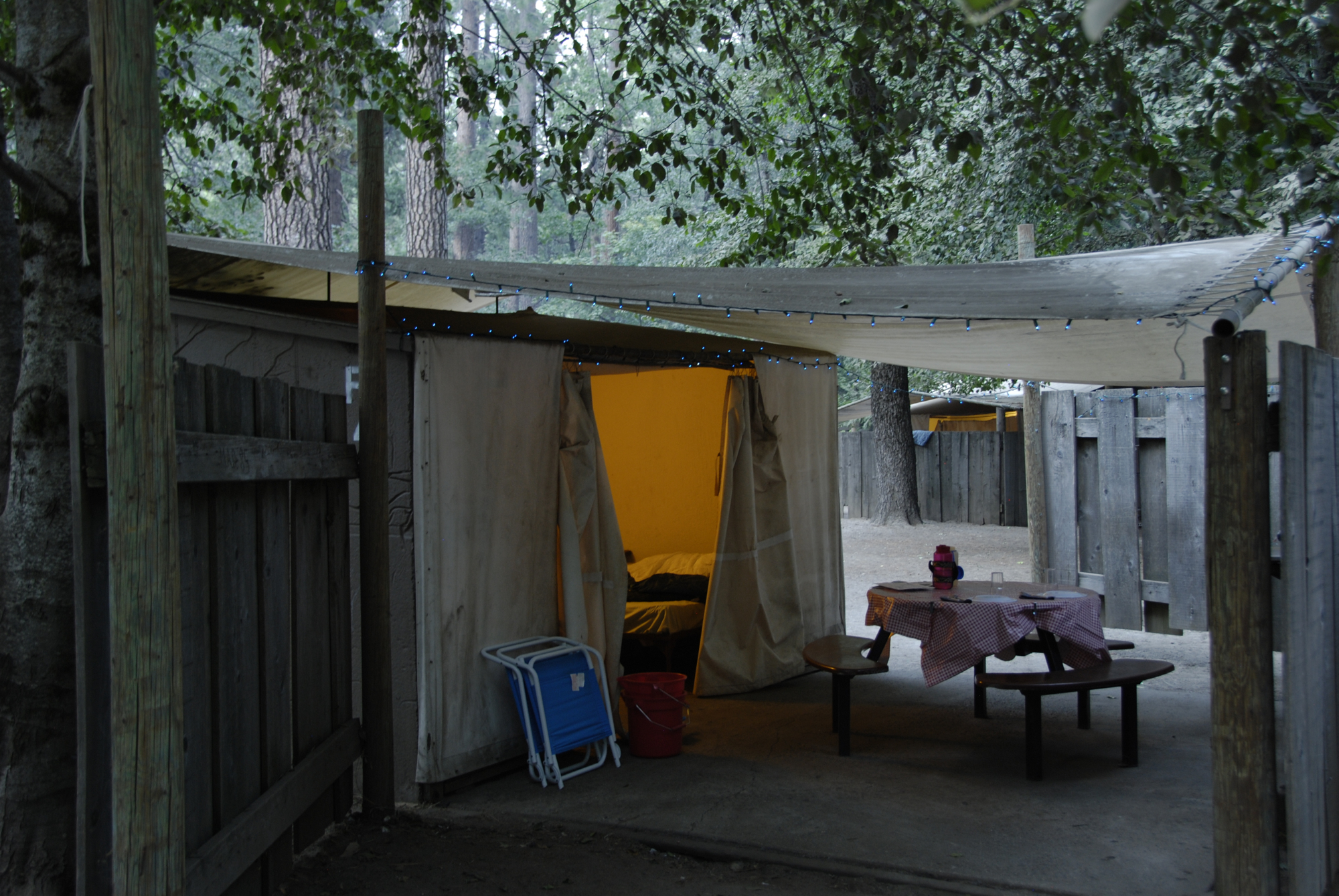
A Housekeeping Camp lodging unit.

Housekeeping Camp, located in the Yosemite Valley, is one of the more inexpensive lodging options for visitors to Yosemite National Park. The camp is open from April through October and is one of the most popular places to stay in the valley. Reservations typically fill up on the first day they become available. The original design of the camp was intended to provide a camping-like experience for visitors who did not want to have to provide their own equipment.

== History ==
Around 1920, the Housekeeping Camp was established in the form of an automobile camp. Later on, the camp provided the rental of camping equipment for visitors in addition to the housing of park housekeeping facilities. In the early 1960s, lodging units were added.

== Amenities ==
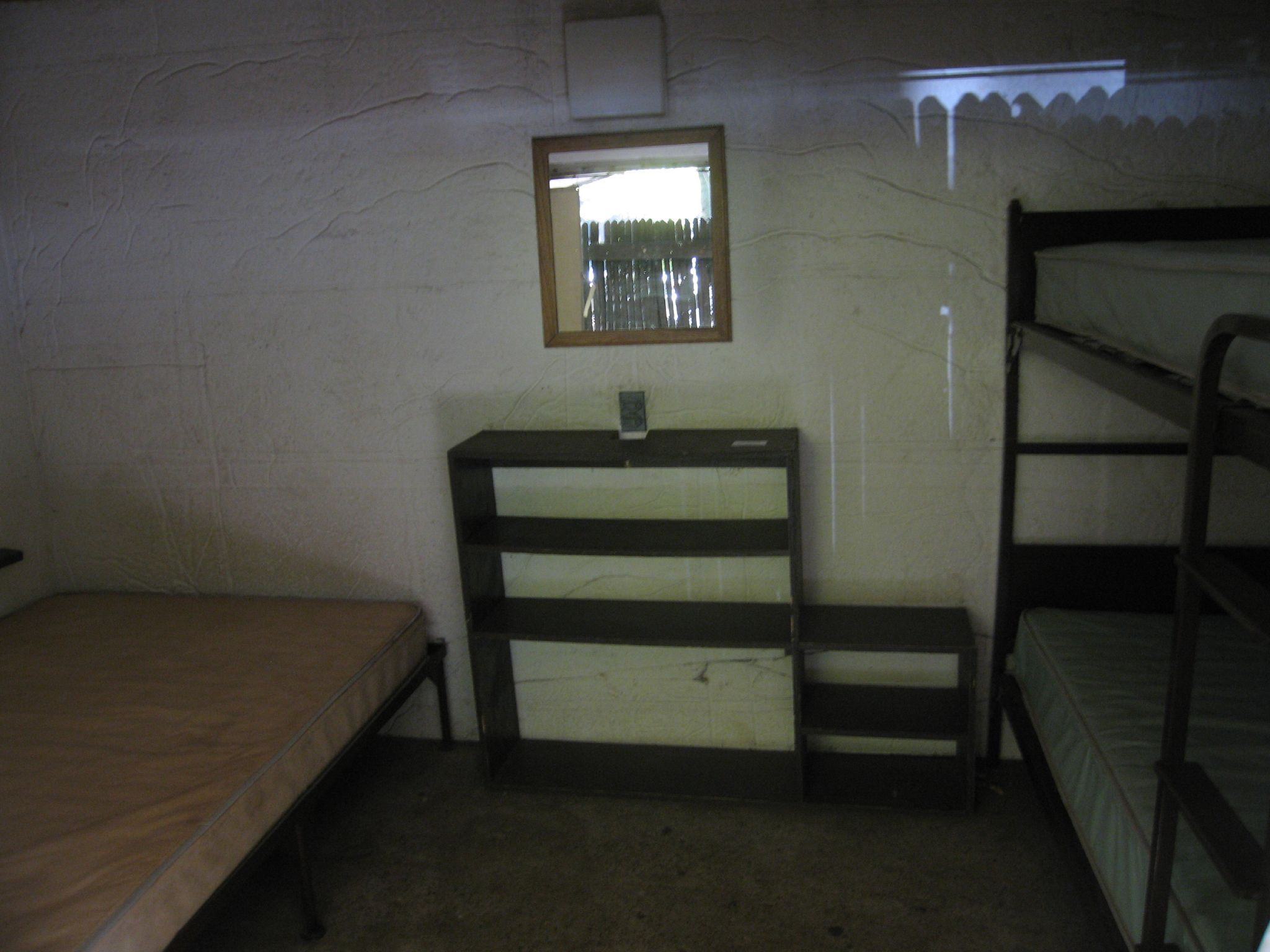
Lodging unit room interior.

The lodging is somewhere between camping and staying in a hotel where there are three concrete walls enclosing beds covered by canvas rooftops and one curtain wall. Outside there is a table and lounge area all covered by the rooftop along with a fire pit nearby. There are 266 total units that can sleep up to six people. Each unit is equipped with electricity. Housekeeping Camp contains its own beach along the Merced River, laundry facility, shower facility, bathrooms, and a grocery store. Guest must rent or otherwise provide their own sheets, pillows, and other bedding. Much like Curry Village, guests get a great view of Half Dome and Yosemite Falls. The environment is also shaded by the many trees in the area and cars are allowed to be parked next to the campsite.

Some of the downsides include noise and close proximity to neighbors. Campfires are only permitted from 5:00 p.m. to 10:00 p.m. during the months of May to October..
