= Le Conte pear =

Fruit hybrid

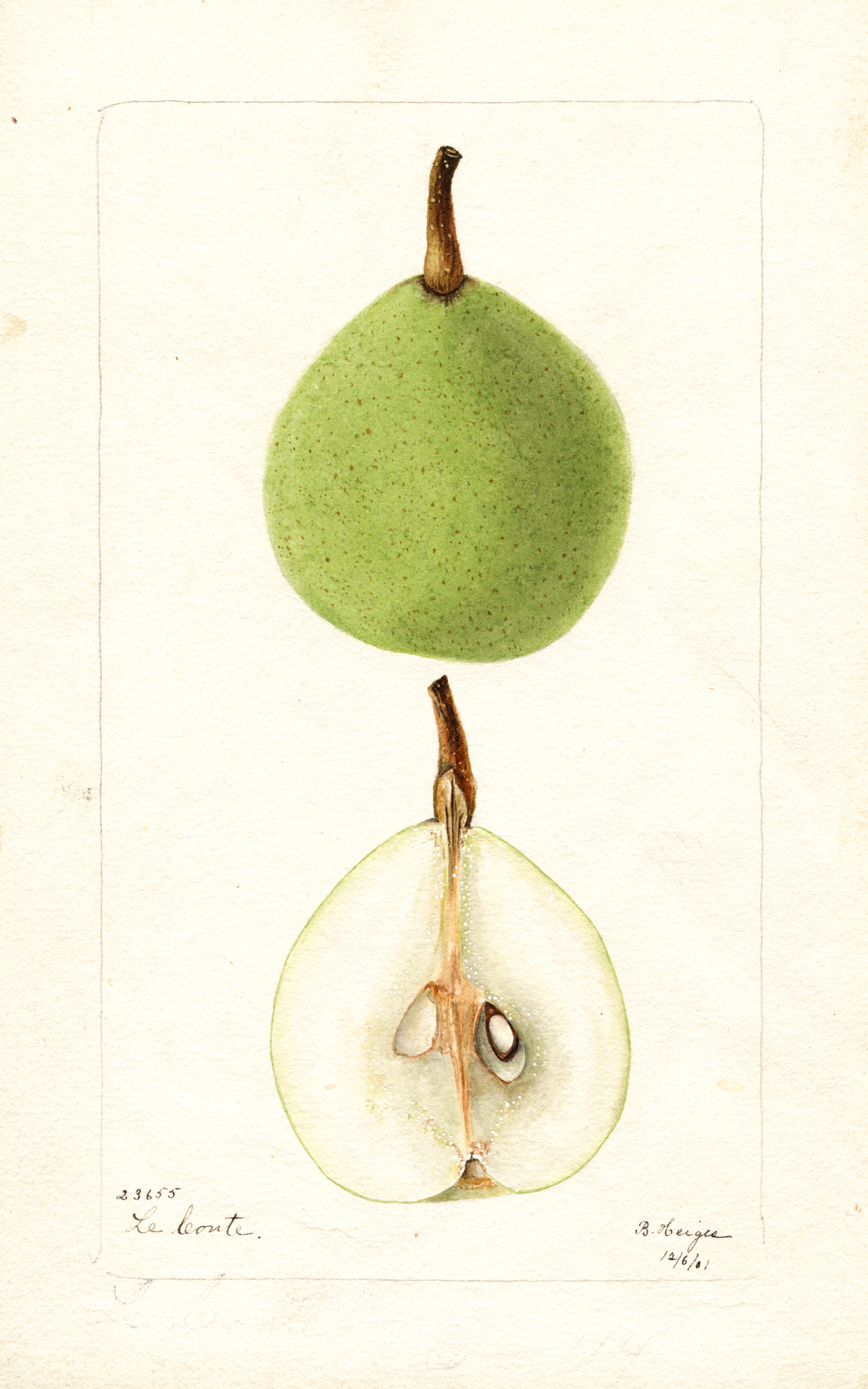
- Fruit of the Le Conte pear
- Hybrid parentage: Pyrus hybrid P. x lecontei P. communis x P. pyrifolia
- Cultivar: 'Le Conte'
- Origin: Georgia, 1856 (Rehder)

The Le Conte pear is a deciduous pear tree growing up to 8 metres. It is not frost tender. The flowers are hermaphrodite and are pollinated by insects. The fruit is edible raw or cooked. The flesh resembles that of the Asian pear. The fruit can be eaten as soon as it is picked, and can store for several days to several months. It is usually cooked in pies and preserves. The fruit is up to 8 cm long and 5 cm wide. The pear is named after John Eatton Le Conte, who introduced it to Georgia in 1856.

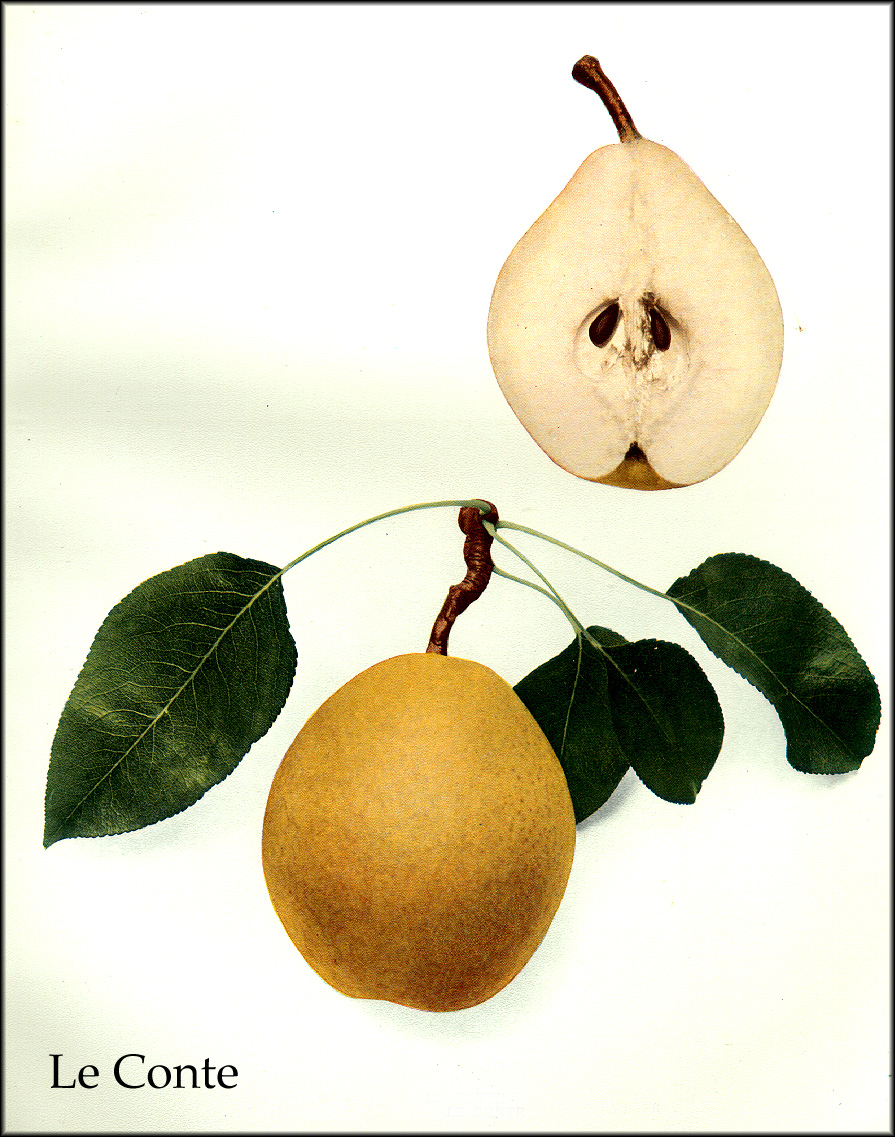
Le Conte pear, from The Pears of New York (1921) by Ulysses Prentiss Hedrick
