= LeConte Bay =

Coordinates: 56°44′29″N 132°30′57″W

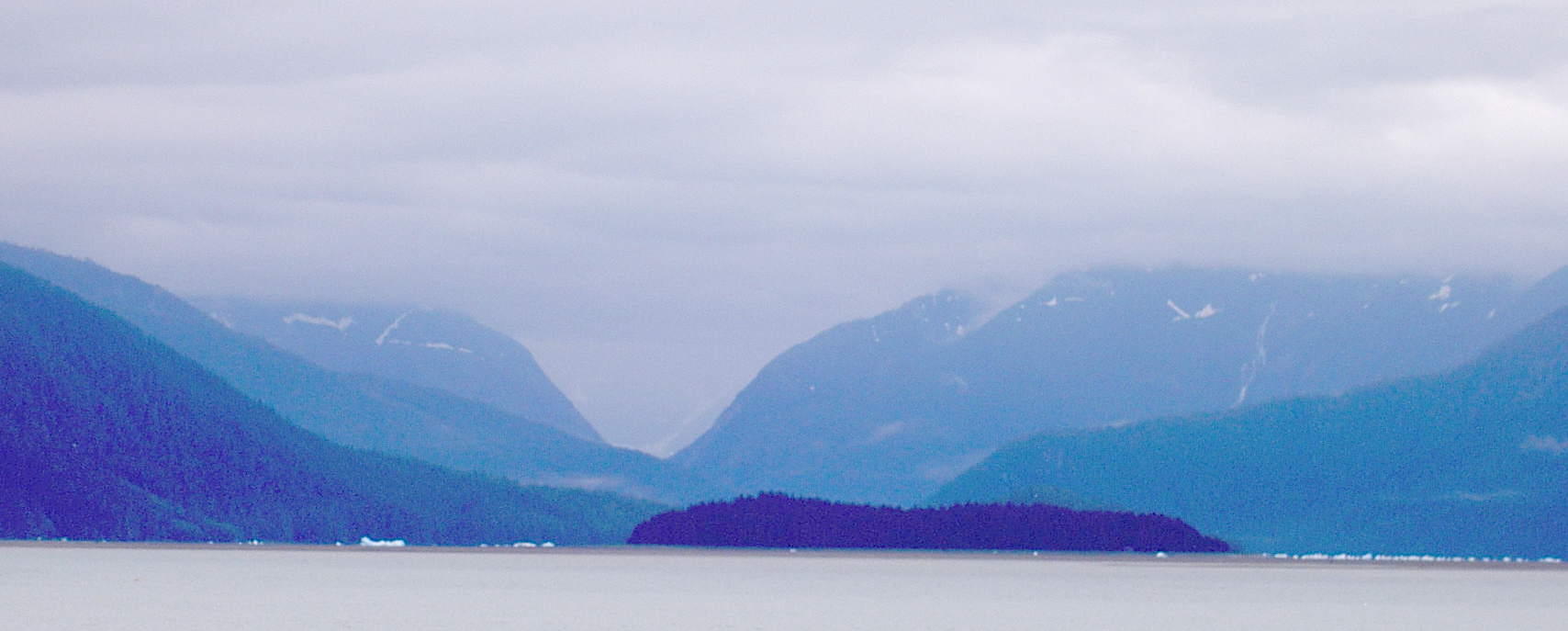
entrance to LeConte Bay in 2011

LeConte Bay is an 810-foot-deep (247 m), six-mile-long (10 km) bay in the southeastern region of the U.S. state of Alaska, located east of Frederick Sound.

The bay was named in 1887 for Joseph LeConte, then professor of geology at the University of California. According to John Muir, the local Tlingit name for the bay is Hutli, the mythical thunderbird.

LeConte Bay is a very steep-sided fjord that is home to a seal rookery and the terminus of LeConte Glacier.
