= Leconte Island =

Island in Nunavut, Canada

- Interactive map of Leconte Island

Geography
- Location: Northern Canada
- Coordinates: 78°35′N 74°46′W
- Archipelago: Arctic Archipelago

Administration
- Canada
- Nunavut: Nunavut
- Region: Qikiqtaaluk

Demographics
- Population: Uninhabited

Leconte Island is a small, uninhabited island in Qikiqtaaluk, Nunavut, Canada. It is located in the Labrador Sea off Baffin Island's Lefferts Glacier.
