= LeConte Falls =

- Interactive map of LeConte Falls
- Location: Yosemite Valley, Yosemite National Park, California, U.S.
- Coordinates: 37°55′24″N 119°27′06″W
- Type: Slide

LeConte Falls is a waterfall in the Sierra Nevada of California, in Yosemite National Park. It is a 229 ft. (69.8 m.) high cascade on the Tuolumne River and the second largest falls on this river. (The river's largest falls is Waterwheel Falls, which is about .6 miles (1 km.) distant following the river downstream along the Grand Canyon of the Tuolumne.) It was named in 1894 in honor of Professor Joseph LeConte by Robert M. Price; however, Price's original intent was to designate what is now called "Waterwheel Falls" as "LeConte Falls" but a mapmaker assigned the name to what was once called "California Falls" and the mapmaker's mistaken designation was adopted as the standard.

== See also ==
- List of waterfalls
- List of waterfalls in California
