= LeConte Glacier =

Alaskan Glacier

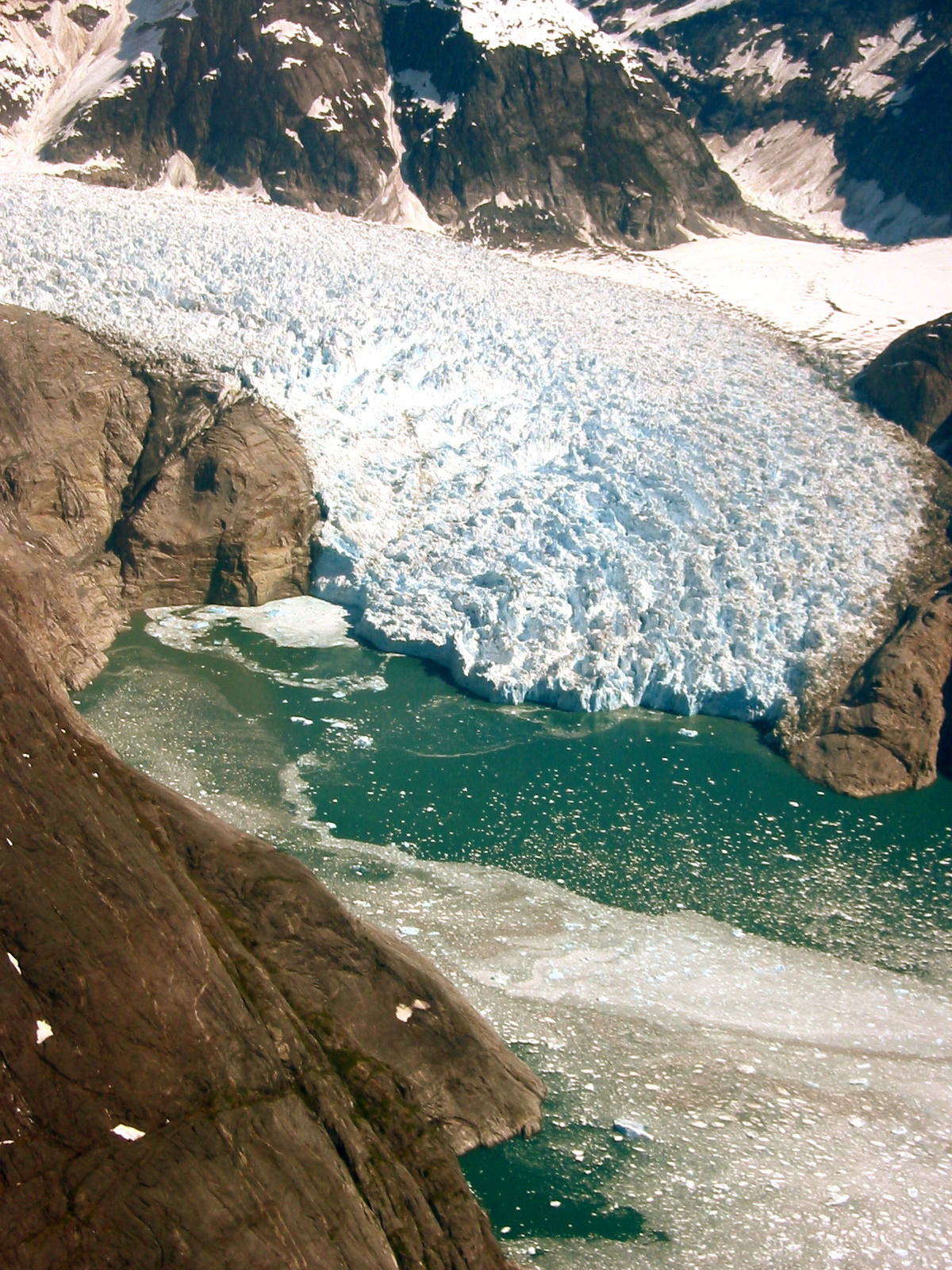
- LeConte Glacier terminus at LeConte Bay

- Location within Alaska
- Interactive map of LeConte Glacier
- Location: Petersburg Borough, Alaska, U.S.
- Coordinates: 56°56′46″N 132°19′46″W

LeConte Glacier is a 21-mile (34 km) long and 1-mile (1.6 km) wide glacier in Petersburg Borough, Alaska, United States. It flows southwest to the head of LeConte Bay. It was named in 1887 by U.S. Navy Lieutenant-Commander Charles M. Thomas in honor of a California geologist Joseph LeConte. According to John Muir's book about indigenous peoples of the area, the Tlingits called it “Huti [sic]” which he claimed derived from a mythical bird that produced sounds of thunder when it flapped its wings.

Since its discovery, the glacier has retreated nearly 2.5 miles (4.0 km), although it is considered to be in a stable position today . The glacier is known for its "shooter" icebergs which calve off underneath the water (LeConte Bay is 810 feet (250 m) deep) and shoot out of the water due to their buoyancy. In 2019 acoustic observations found that the submarine part of LeConte Glacier melts significantly faster than previously predicted by scientific theory.

Being south of the 57th parallel north, LeConte Glacier is the southernmost tidewater glacier of the Northern Hemisphere.

The glacier is a popular tourist destination, with operators from nearby Petersburg and Wrangell running excursions to its calving face. Students from Petersburg High School visiting also regularly to monitor its historical retreat.

Also of the same namesake and part of the Alaska Marine Highway is the ferry M/V LeConte.

== See also ==
- List of glaciers
