= Joseph LeConte =

American geologist and academic (1823–1901)

Joseph Le Conte
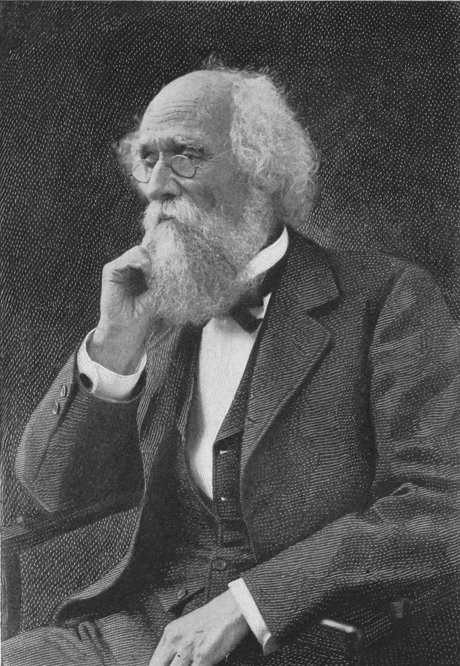
- Born: February 26, 1823; Liberty County, Georgia, US
- Died: July 6, 1901 (aged 78); Yosemite Valley, California, US
- Education: Franklin College (University of Georgia); New York College of Physicians and Surgeons; Harvard University
- Occupations: Physician, scholar, professor and conservationist
- Spouse: Caroline Nisbet

Joseph Le Conte (alternative spelling: Joseph LeConte) (February 26, 1823 – July 6, 1901) was a physician, geologist, professor at the University of California, Berkeley, early California conservationist, and eugenicist.

== Early life ==
Of Huguenot descent, he was born in Liberty County, Georgia, to Louis LeConte, patriarch of the noted LeConte family, and Ann Quarterman. He was educated at Franklin College in Athens, Georgia (now the Franklin College of Arts and Sciences at the University of Georgia), where he was a member of the Phi Kappa Literary Society. After graduation in 1841, he studied medicine and received his degree at the New York College of Physicians and Surgeons in 1845. (In 1844 he travelled with his cousin John Lawrence LeConte for over one thousand miles along the Upper Mississippi River in a birchbark canoe.) After practising for three or four years in Macon, Georgia, he entered Harvard University and studied natural history under Louis Agassiz. An excursion made with Professors J. Hall and Agassiz to the Helderberg mountains of New York developed a keen interest in geology.

== Career ==
After graduating from Harvard, Le Conte in 1851 accompanied Agassiz on an expedition to study the Florida Reef. On his return he became professor of natural science at Oglethorpe University, which was located in Midway, Georgia, at the time, and from December 1852 until 1856 professor of natural history and geology at Franklin College (the sole college at the University of Georgia at that time). From 1857 to 1869 he was a professor of chemistry and geology at South Carolina College, which is now the University of South Carolina.

On January 14, 1846, he married Caroline Nisbet, a niece of Eugenius A. Nisbet. The couple had four children grow to adulthood: Emma Florence Le Conte, Sarah Elizabeth Le Conte, Caroline Eaton Le Conte, and Joseph Nisbet Le Conte.

During the Civil War Le Conte continued to teach in South Carolina. He also produced medicine and was involved in research and development operations of the Confederate Nitre and Mining Bureau, associated with the Confederate Secret Service. In his autobiography he wrote that he found Reconstruction intolerable. He referred to "a carpet-bag governor, scalawag officials, and a negro legislature controlled by rascals" and stated that the "sudden enfranchisement of the negro without qualification was the greatest political crime ever perpetrated by any people".

Discouraged by unsettled postwar conditions at the University of South Carolina, in 1868 he accepted an offer of a professorship at the newly established University of California. In September 1869, he moved west to Berkeley, California. His older brother John had come to California in April 1869, also to join the faculty of the new university as a professor of physics. Joseph was appointed the first professor of geology and natural history and botany at the university, a post which he held until his death.

He was elected as a member of the American Philosophical Society in 1873.

He published a series of papers on monocular and binocular vision, and also on psychology. His chief contributions, however, related to geology. He described the fissure-eruptions in western America, discoursed on earth-crust movements and their causes and on the great features of the Earth's surface. As separate works he published Elements of Geology (1878, 5th edition 1889); Religion and Science (1874); and Evolution and its Relation to Religious Thought (1888). This last work anticipates in structure and argument Teilhard de Chardin's "Phenomenon of Man".(1955). LeConte endorsed theistic evolution.

== Legacy ==
In 1874, he was nominated to the National Academy of Sciences. He was president of the American Association for the Advancement of Science in 1892, and of the Geological Society of America in 1896. Le Conte is also noted for his exploration and preservation of the Sierra Nevada of California, United States. He first visited Yosemite Valley in 1870, where he became friends with John Muir and started exploring the Sierra. He became concerned that resource exploitation (such as sheepherding) would ruin the Sierra, so he co-founded the Sierra Club with Muir and others in 1892. He was a director of the Sierra Club from 1892 through 1898. His son, Joseph Nisbet LeConte, was also a noted professor and Sierra Club member.

He died of a heart attack in Yosemite Valley, California, on July 6, 1901, right before the Sierra Club's first High Trip. The Sierra Club built the LeConte Memorial Lodge in his honor in 1904. The Le Conte Glacier, Le Conte Divide, Le Conte Falls, Le Conte Mountain and Mount Le Conte were named after him. LeConte Hall, which houses the Department of History at the University of Georgia, was named for him and his brother. LeConte College, which houses the Department of Mathematics and Statistics near the Horseshoe at the University of South Carolina, Le Conte Middle School in Hollywood, and Le Conte Avenue in Berkeley also honor the two brothers.

Leconte and fellow Sierra Club founder Stanford President David Starr Jordan were advocates of white supremacy and supporters of the eugenics movement in the United States. In 2016 the Sierra Club renamed LeConte Memorial Lodge the "Yosemite Conservation Heritage Center" after considering LeConte's racist views. The elementary school at 2241 Russell Street in Berkeley was named for Joseph LeConte from 1892 until 2018, when it was renamed due to concerns regarding his views on race.

Another building at UC Berkeley was also renamed, as announced on July 7, 2020, due to the LeConte brothers' support of white supremacy and vigorous white supremacy writings in that regard.

== See also ==
- Neo-Lamarckism
