= John Eatton Le Conte =

American entomologist

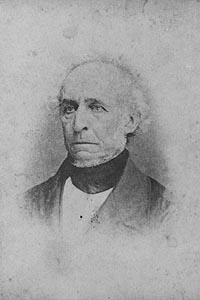
- Portrait of John Eatton Le Conte taken in 1860, the year of his death
- Born: February 22, 1784; Shrewsbury, New Jersey
- Died: November 21, 1860 (aged 76)
- Education: Columbia College of Columbia University
- Scientific career
- Fields: Natural history
- Workplaces: Linnean Society of London; New York Academy of Sciences; Academy of Natural Sciences

John Eatton Le Conte Jr. (sometimes John Eatton LeConte or John Eaton Leconte) (February 22, 1784 – November 21, 1860) was an American naturalist. He was born near Shrewsbury, New Jersey, the son of John Eatton Le Conte and Jane Sloane Le Conte. He graduated from Columbia College, where he showed an interest in science and was taught natural history by David Hosack, founder of Elgin Botanical Garden.

John Le Conte's older brother Louis inherited the family plantation, Woodmanston, near Midway in Georgia. Although John Le Conte usually lived in New York or New England, he spent his winters at Woodmanston. He suffered from rheumatism, and possibly other ailments, for most of his adult life.

In April 1818 Le Conte was appointed captain in the United States Army Corps of Topographical Engineers. His early assignments included surveying the vicinity of Norfolk, Virginia, the harbor at Savannah, Georgia and Ossabaw Sound, Georgia. LeConte was promoted to brevet major in April 1828, and resigned his commission in August 1831.

Early in 1821 John Le Conte approached John C. Calhoun, Secretary of War, to propose an exploration expedition to the newly acquired territory of Florida. Later in the year he again contacted Secretary Calhoun, noting that he was assigned to survey the harbor at Savannah that winter, and proposing that he undertake an expedition to Florida while in Georgia for the winter. He requested $970 for the expedition, including the cost of hiring a sloop and crew for one month. The War Department provided him with $600. In early 1822 he proceeded to Fernandina, Florida, carrying an order issued by Major General Winfield Scott that the commanding officer at Amelia Island provide eight men and a non-commissioned officer to accompany Le Conte on his expedition. A Lieutenant Edwin R. Alberti also joined Le Conte's expedition.

The Le Conte party explored up the St. Johns River. The St. Johns River had previously been explored by John and William Bartram in 1765-66 and again by William Bartram in 1773–77, but neither expedition had reached the source of the river. Le Conte also failed to find the headwaters of the river. He wrongly concluded that Lake Okeechobee (which was shown as the source for the St. Johns River on many maps) did not exist, and his description of the river upstream from Lake George is inaccurate.

His earliest publication (1811) was a Latin text catalogue of plants found on Manhattan Island. An early ambition to publish an American flora was partially pre-empted when Stephen Elliott began A Sketch of the Botany of South-Carolina and Georgia.

He then published a number of papers, each on a separate plant genus. In some, he was critical of Elliott's work although sharing his notes on Utricularia with Elliott. After Elliott's death, Le Conte published only occasional papers on plants.

Le Conte's primary interests were zoological, and he co-authored with Jean Baptiste Boisduval a book on insects, Histoire général et iconographie des lepidoptérès et des chenilles de l’Amerique septentrionale (that is, "General history and illustrations of the Lepidoptera and caterpillars of North{ern} America"), which was published at Paris. Many of the illustrations for this work were done by John Abbot.

He also wrote on frogs, toads, small mammals, reptiles, and crustaceans. Le Conte's color drawings of North American tortoises led to him being called The Audubon of Turtles. He described and named twenty-two species and sub-species of terrapins and tortoises in the southeastern United States.

John Eatton Le Conte was a fellow of the Linnean Society of London and served as vice-president of the Lyceum of Natural History of New York. When he moved to Philadelphia after 1841, he was elected vice-president of the Academy of Natural Sciences. In 1851, he was elected as a member of the American Philosophical Society.

John Eatton Le Conte married Mary Ann Hampton Lawrence on July 22, 1821, in New York. Their son John Lawrence Le Conte, who became one of the USA's most important early entomologists, was born on May 13, 1825, in New York. Mary Le Conte died November 19, 1825, while traveling to Georgia from New York. John Eatton Le Conte died on November 21, 1860.

== Sources ==
- Adicks, Richard, Ed. (1978) Le Conte's Report on East Florida. Orlando, Florida: The University Presses of Florida.
- Calhoun, J. (2004). Histoire Générale et Iconographie des Lépidoptères et des Chenilles de l’Amérique septentrionale by Boisduval and Le Conte (1829-[1837]): original drawings used for the engraved plates and the true identities of four figured taxa. Journal of the Lepidopterists' Society 58:143-168.
- Calhoun, J. (2005). A signature worth a thousand words [correct configuration of Le Conte's surname]. News of the Lepidopterists' Society 47:114.
- Calhoun, J. (2006). John Abbot's "lost" drawings for John Eatton Le Conte in the American Philosophical Society Library, Philadelphia. Journal of the Lepidopterists' Society 60:211-217.
- Rogers-Price, Vivian; Rogers, George A.; Frost, Cynthia J. (January 2004). "John Eaton LeConte (1784—1860) was born near Shrewsbury, NJ". Georgia Journal of Science. Archived from the original on November 9, 2005 – via FindArticles.
- Integrated Taxonmic Information System Search Results Taxon Author(s): LeConte (1830) - retrieved February 24, 2006
- The John Abbot Watercolors at the University of South Carolina - retrieved February 26, 2006
