= List of physiogeographic regions of British Columbia =

The following list comprises the physiogeographic regions of the Canadian province of British Columbia as defined by S.S. Holland in Bulletin 48 of the Ministry of Energy, Mines and Petroleum Resources' Landforms of British Columbia.

== Western Cordillera (Canadian Cordillera) ==
=== Western System ===
==== Outer Mountain Area ====
- Saint Elias Mountains
  - Fairweather Range
  - Duke Depression
  - Alsek Ranges
  - Icefield Ranges
- Insular Mountains
  - Queen Charlotte Mountains
    - Skidegate Plateau
    - Queen Charlotte Ranges
  - Vancouver Island Mountains
    - Vancouver Island Ranges
    - Alberni Basin
    - Estevan Lowland (a.k.a. Estevan Strandflat)

==== Coastal Trough ====
- Hecate Depression
  - Queen Charlotte Lowland
    - Argonaut Plain
  - Nahwitti Lowland
    - Suquash Basin
  - Hecate Lowland
    - Milbanke Strandflat
- Georgia Depression
  - Georgia Lowland
    - Fraser Lowland
  - Nanaimo Lowland

==== Coast Mountain Area ====
- Coast Mountains
  - Boundary Ranges
  - Kitimat Ranges
  - Fiord Ranges - Geophysical Survey of Canada designation for the Kitimat Ranges, plus the lower portion of the Pacific Ranges between the icefield-massifs at the core of the range and the coast. The latter are sometimes labelled the Front Ranges on some topographic maps but are not in evidence on modern versions.
  - Pacific Ranges
    - Chilcotin Ranges
- Cascade Mountains
  - Coquihalla Range
  - Skagit Range
  - Hozameen Range
  - Okanagan Range

=== Interior System ===
==== Northern Plateau and Mountain Area ====
- Yukon Plateau
  - Tagish Highland
  - Teslin Plateau
  - Nisutlin Plateau
- Liard Plain

==== Central Plateau and Mountain Area (Interior Mountains) ====
- Stikine Plateau
  - Tahltan Highland
  - Taku Plateau
  - Kawdy Plateau
    - Atsutla Range
  - Nahlin Plateau
  - Tanzilla Plateau
  - Klastline Plateau
  - Spatsizi Plateau
- Skeena Mountains
  - Kippan Range
  - Tatlatui Range
  - Eaglenest Range
  - Sicintine Range
  - Slamgeesh Range
- Nass Basin (Nass Depression)
- Hazelton Mountains
  - Nass Ranges
  - Kispiox Range
  - Bulkley Ranges
  - Tahtsa Ranges
- Cassiar Mountains
  - Dease Plateau
    - Horseranch Range
  - Stikine Ranges
  - Kechika Ranges
  - Sifton Ranges
- Omineca Mountains
  - Swannell Ranges
  - Finlay Ranges
  - Hogem Ranges

==== Southern Plateau and Mountain Area ====
- Interior Plateau
  - Fraser Basin
    - Nechako Plain
  - Nechako Plateau
    - McGregor Plateau
  - Fraser Plateau
    - Cariboo Plateau
    - Chilcotin Plateau
  - Thompson Plateau
  - Quesnel Highland
  - Shuswap Highland
  - Okanagan Highland
- Columbia Mountains
  - Cariboo Mountains
  - Monashee Mountains
  - Selkirk Mountains
  - Purcell Mountains

=== Eastern System ===
==== Mackenzie Mountain Area ====
- Liard Plateau

==== Rocky Mountain Area ====
- Rocky Mountains
  - Border Ranges
    - Galton Range
    - MacDonald Range
    - Clarke Range
  - Continental Ranges
    - Front Ranges
    - Kootenay Ranges
    - Park Ranges
  - Hart Ranges
    - Misinchinka Ranges
  - Muskwa Ranges
    - Rabbit Platuea
- Rocky Mountain Foothills
