= Interior Mountains =

Group of mountain ranges in British Columbia and Yukon

- Northern Interior Mountains
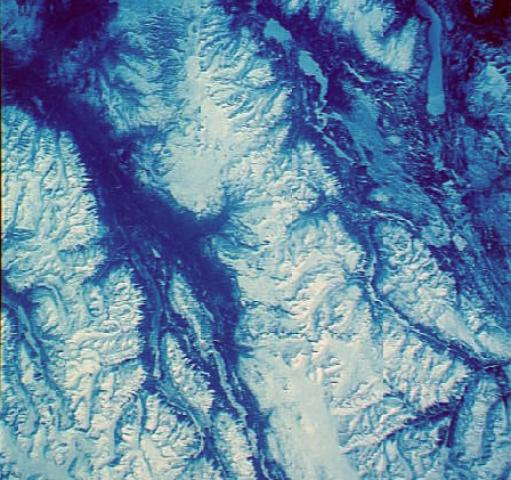
- Satellite photo of the Spectrum Range

Highest point
- Coordinates: 57°55′36.8″N 126°50′53.9″W

Dimensions
- Area: 221,310 km^{2} (85,450 mi^{2})

Geography
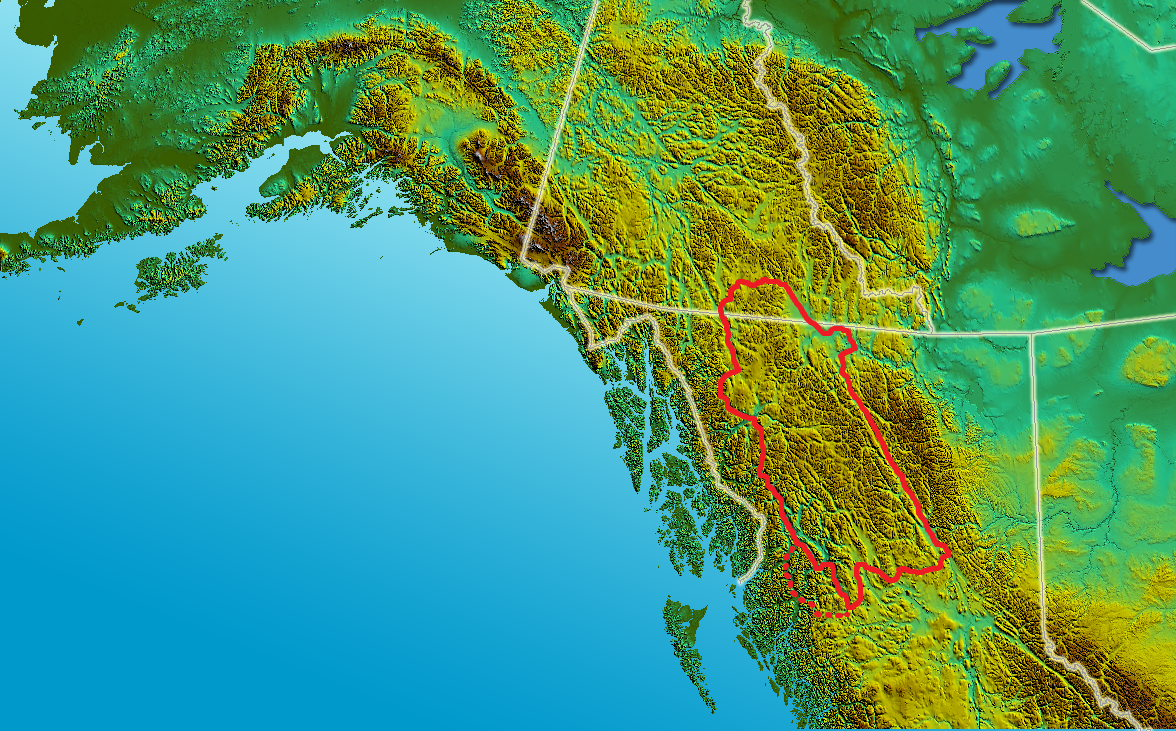
- Location map of the Interior Mountains
- Location: British Columbia and Yukon
- Parent range: Interior System

The Interior Mountains or Northern Interior Mountains are the semi-official names for an expansive collection of mountain ranges that comprises much of the northern half of the Canadian province of British Columbia and a large area of southern Yukon.

There are four main groupings, the Skeena, Cassiar and Omineca Mountains to the north of the Interior Plateau between the Coast Mountains to the west and the Rocky Mountains to the east, and the Hazelton Mountains along the Interior Plateau's northwestern flank against the Coast Mountains, extending from the Bulkley Ranges south to the Bella Coola River. Included within the Interior Mountains system is the Stikine Plateau, which contains a number of sub-plateaus and various mountain ranges and is located west of the Cassiars, north of the Skeenas, and to the east of the Boundary Ranges of the Coast Mountains.

Most of the thousands of summits in the Interior Mountains are unnamed, and they are mostly uninhabited and undeveloped.

== Etymology ==
The terms Interior Mountains and Northern Interior Mountains were coined by British Columbia government geographer Stuart Holland in the course of writing his Landforms of British Columbia, which is a definitive volume on the province's topography and toponymy written in 1964. This work is used as the basis for official toponymies such as those in the provincial gazette and the British Columbia Geographic Names Information System Database (BCGNIS), which is the official registry of the province's geographic names.

The term Interior Mountains, used by Holland throughout his work and as a chapter heading describing the mountain system in question, is not present in the Geographical Names Database despite being a chapter heading and appearing on Holland's map of the province's landform systems. He suggests, also, the term "Northern Interior Mountains", partly because the mountain system is in a region also known as the Northern Interior, but also to potentially distinguish this mountain system from mountain ranges farther south in the province's Interior, including those of the Interior Plateau. In his exegesis, he decided on "Interior Mountains" for reasons of brevity.

== Component ranges and plateaus ==
Major mountain ranges and plateaus that are considered part of the Interior Mountains are included.

=== Cassiar Mountains ===
- Dease Plateau
- Kechika Ranges
- Sifton Ranges
- Stikine Ranges

=== Hazelton Mountains ===
- Bulkley Ranges
- Kispiox Range
- Nass Ranges
- Pattullo Range
- Tahtsa Ranges

=== Omineca Mountains ===
- Finlay Ranges
- Hogem Ranges
- Metsantan Range
- Samuel Black Range
- Swannell Ranges
- Tatlatui Range

=== Skeena Mountains ===
- Atna Range
- Babine Range
- Bait Range
- Driftwood Range
- Klappan Range
- Oweegee Range
- Sicintine Range
- Slamgeesh Range
- Strata Range
- Takla Range

=== Stikine Plateau ===
- Kawdy Plateau
- Nahlin Plateau
- Spatsizi Plateau
- Tagish Highland (NB sometimes defined as part of the Coast Mountains)
- Tahltan Highland (NB sometimes defined as part of the Coast Mountains)
- Taku Plateau (NB sometimes defined as part of the Yukon Plateau)
- Tanzilla Plateau

== Parks and protected areas ==
- Boya Lake Provincial Park
- Dall River Old Growth Provincial Park
- Denetiah Provincial Park
- Dune Za Keyih Provincial Park and Protected Area
- Horneline Creek Provincial Park
- Hyland River Provincial Park
- Kinaskan Lake Provincial Park
- Mount Edziza Provincial Park
- Rainbow Alley Provincial Park
- Spatsizi Plateau Wilderness Provincial Park
- Stikine River Provincial Park
- Todagin South Slope Provincial Park
- Tuya Mountains Provincial Park

=== Proposed protected areas ===
- Sacred Headwaters

== See also ==
- Interior Plateau
