= Spatsizi Mountain =

Mountain in British Columbia, Canada

- Location within British Columbia

Highest point
- Elevation: 2,056 m (6,745 ft)
- Prominence: 139 m (456 ft)
- Listing: Mountains of British Columbia
- Coordinates: 57°31′45″N 128°38′00″W

Geography
- Location: British Columbia, Canada
- District: Cassiar Land District
- Parent range: Spatsizi Plateau
- Topo map: NTS 104H10 Cold Fish Lake

Spatsizi Mountain is a mountain in the Spatsizi Plateau, a sub-plateau of the Stikine Plateau in north-central British Columbia, Canada. The name "Spatsizi" derives from the Sekani language and means "red goat", as mountain goats in this region are known to roll on a particular red mountain, resulting in a red colour to their coats.

== See also ==
- Spatsizi Plateau Wilderness Provincial Park
- Spatsizi Headwaters Provincial Park
- Spatsizi River
