= Tsay Keh Dene =

Tsay Keh Dene, meaning "people of the rocks" in the Sekani language, may mean:

- Sekani people of northern British Columbia, Canada
- Tsay Keh Dene First Nation, the band government of the Sekani people
- Sekani language
