= Todagin Wildlife Management Area =

Canadian species management area

- IUCN category IV (habitat/species management area)
- Location within British Columbia
- Location: Kitimat–Stikine RD, British Columbia
- Nearest city: Iskut
- Coordinates: 57°32′00″N 129°47′43″W
- Area: 122,787 ha (474.08 sq mi)
- Established: 19 March 2001
- Governing body: FLNRORD
- Website: Todagin WMA

Todagin Wildlife Management Area is a wildlife management area located southeast of Iskut in northwestern British Columbia. It was established by the British Columbia Ministry of Forests, Lands, Natural Resource Operations and Rural Development (FLNRORD) on 19 March 2001 to conserve and manage critical habitat for stone sheep. It is the largest wildlife management area in British Columbia at 122,787 ha (303,410 acres).

== Geography ==
Todagin Wildlife Management Area covers a large area of the northern Klappan Range stretching from Maitland Creek to Ealue Lake between the Iskut and Klappan rivers. It surrounds the smaller, less strictly protected Todagin South Slope Provincial Park.

The wildlife management area also is home to Maitland Volcano, an extinct volcano that is located in the Klappan Range.

== Ecology ==
=== Flora ===
The highlands provide habitat for dwarf ericaceous shrubs, dwarf birch, willow, grass, and lichen. By contrast, the broad valley bottoms provide habitat for dense forests of black spruce, white spruce, and alpine fir.

=== Fauna ===
Resident mammal species include grizzly bear, wolf, moose, woodland caribou, mountain goat, stone sheep, and hoary marmot. Resident bird species include northern goshawk, great horned owl, yellow-bellied sapsucker, green-winged teal, blue-listed short-eared owl, and locally endangered Hudsonian godwit.

== See also ==
- Tahltan First Nation
- Sacred Headwaters
