= Metsantan =

Metsantan may refer to:

- Metsantan Pass, a mountain pass in British Columbia, Canada
- Metsantan Range, a mountain range in British Columbia, Canada
- Caribou Hide, a former settlement in British Columbia, Canada
