= Gladys Lake Ecological Reserve =

Protected area in British Columbia, Canada

- IUCN category Ia (strict nature reserve)
- Location within British Columbia
- Interactive map of Gladys Lake Ecological Reserve
- Location: British Columbia, Canada
- Coordinates: 57°35′17″N 128°51′26″W
- Area: 44,098 ha (170.26 sq mi)
- Designation: Ecological Reserve
- Established: 1975
- Governing body: BC Parks

Gladys Lake Ecological Reserve is an ecological reserve located in the Eaglenest Range of the Spatsizi Plateau in north-central British Columbia, Canada. It was established in 1975 under the Ecological Reserves Act to facilitate scientific research of the region's alpine-subalpine ecosystems while discouraging outdoor recreation use. The reserve protects 44,098 hectares (108,970 acres) of pristine wilderness and is the largest ecological reserve in British Columbia.

== Geography ==
The reserve is an enclave within the larger Spatsizi Plateau Wilderness Provincial Park, though with stricter protections and limited public access.

== See also ==
- Todagin Wildlife Management Area
