= Mount Gunanoot =

Mountain in British Columbia, Canada

Coordinates: 57°06′41″N 128°53′40″W

Mount Gunanoot is a mountain in the Spatsizi Plateau of the North-Central Interior of British Columbia, Canada, located just east of the headwaters of the Spatsizi River. It is named for Simon Gunanoot, a Gitxsan packer, entrepreneur and erstwhile fugitive who was hunted for several years before turning himself in for trial and being acquitted. Gunanoot is responsible for "opening up" most of the country in this region.

== See also ==
- Sacred Headwaters
- Spatsizi Headwaters Provincial Park
- Spatsizi Plateau Wilderness Provincial Park
- Gunanoot Lake
