= Simon Gunanoot =

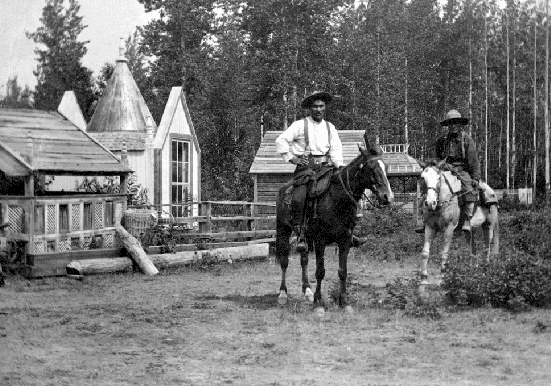
Simon Gunanoot (left) at the Hazelton Indian Cemetery

Simon Gunanoot (1874 – October 1933) was a prosperous Gitxsan man and a merchant in the Kispiox Valley region of Hazelton, British Columbia, Canada. He lived with his wife and children on a large ranch. A posse sought him after a murder but he escaped, retrieved his family and hid out. Eventually he surrendered and stood trial. He was found not guilty. The case garnered extensive media coverage and Gunanoot became a figure of legendary status.

== McIntosh/Leclair murder ==
Gunanoot's brother-in-law, Peter Himadam, his wife and their children also lived at the ranch.

One night, in June 1906, Gunanoot and Himadam were returning from Kitselas when they decided to stop in at the roadhouse at Two Mile, near Hazelton. There, Simon and Peter got into an argument with Hazelton dock worker Alec McIntosh and another man, packer and hunting guide Max Leclair. The argument led to physical blows and threats. Simon left, after commenting he was "going to get a gun and fix him". McIntosh also left for the Hazelton hospital to get his wounds from the fight bandaged.

McIntosh's body was found on the trail a few hours later; nearby was the body of Max Leclair. Both of the men had been shot.

== Manhunt and Trial ==
Based on the reports of the fight at the roadhouse, Constable James Kirby got a posse together and they went out to Gunanoot's ranch. The wives and children were at home, but Simon and Peter were gone. The posse then tracked them to Kitselas. But while they were occupied with questioning the residents of the fishing village, all of their horses either got loose or were set free. Kirby and his posse had to walk 25 miles (40 km) back to the ranch. Upon their arrival they found that Simon and Peter had doubled back, packed up their wives and children and had disappeared. A reward of a thousand dollars was offered for the capture of Gunanoot and Himadam and the search was on. A search that would last for thirteen years, cover thousands of square miles of wilderness and would cost the provincial government $100,000. No one ever claimed the reward although many tried. The Pinkerton Agency was hired, and they failed to find him. By 1914, local law enforcement, decided to just wait him out. Sperry Cline was the Chief at Old Hazelton by then and he took down the wanted poster in the police station and waited for Gunanoot to come into town and surrender.

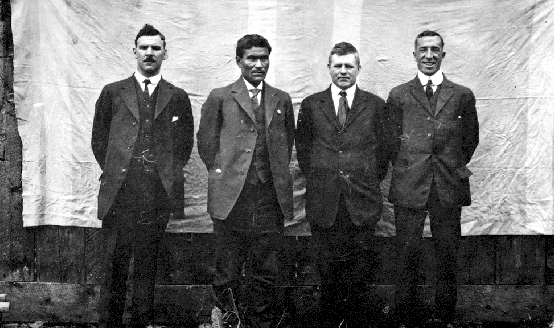
Chief Constable John Kelly, Simon Gunanoot, Constable Cline, Inspector Parsons 1919

In 1919, Gunanoot relayed a message to Cline through George Beirnes, a fellow Kispiox rancher. Gunanoot was ready to turn himself in and wanted a lawyer. Cline hired Stuart Henderson, one of the best criminal defense lawyers in British Columbia, on Gunanoot's behalf. Through Beirnes, a date for Gunanoot's surrender was set and he was met in Hazelton by Stuart Henderson. By the time the case came to trial in New Westminster, it had received national media coverage and Gunanoot's story of survival in the wilderness had become legendary. In the courtroom Henderson argued that the evidence was circumstantial. Gunanoot was found not guilty. After hearing the results of the case, Peter Himadam also surrendered and was given the same verdict.

== Legacy ==
- Mount Gunanoot, near the headwaters of the Spatsizi River, is named for Simon Gunanoot.
- Gunanoot Lake, near the confluence of the Babine and Shelagyote Rivers, is named for Simon Gunanoot.
