= Duncan (Amazay) Lake =

Duncan Lake
- Amazay (Sekani)
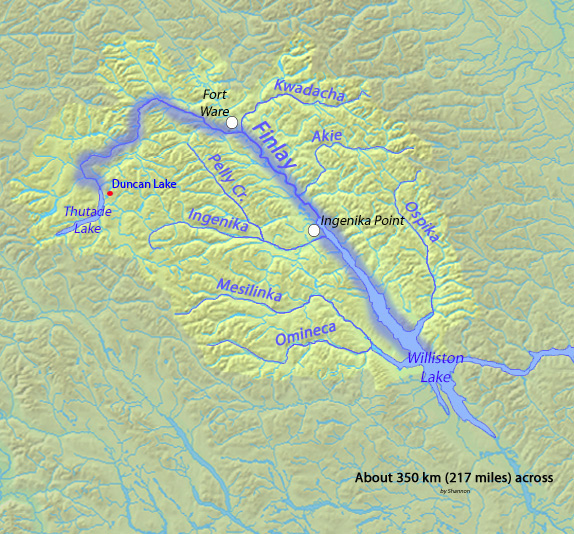
- Duncan Lake, Amazay Lake in Sekani located at the headwaters of the Findlay watershed. This lake is the centre of the traditional land of the Tsay Keh Dene and is part of the three lake rich resource area Amazay/Thutade/Kemess area

- Location within British Columbia
- Location: Northern Interior, British Columbia
- Coordinates: 57°04′N 126°48′W
- Type: lake
- Primary outflows: Finlay River
- Basin countries: Canada
- Max. length: 6 km (3.7 mi)

Duncan Lake – known as Amazay in Sekani– is a natural 6 km (3.7 mi)-long wilderness fish-bearing lake with rainbow trout and whitefish populations, located at the headwaters of the Findlay watershed. in the Omineca Mountains of the Northern Interior of British Columbia, Canada. The Finlay River

The Tse Keh Nay, formerly known as the Ingenika, live at the north end of the Williston Lake in the community of Tsay Keh Dene. They have lived in the Rocky Mountain Trench, also known as the Valley of a Thousand Peaks "for many generations." In 1824 Samuel Black (1780-1841), an early fur trader kept a journal describing his visited to the region with Tse Keh Nay Chief Methodiates and his followers. He described the historic use of the resource rich Amazay/Thutade/Kemess area.

"Amazay Lake is well known to the Tse Keh Nay, and like Thutade Lake, is a site for hunting, fishing and gathering that is rich in oral history. Amazay in Sekani means "little mother lake" or "very superior mother." It is, according to the Tse Keh Nay, "right in the centre of our Tse Keh Nay territory."

— Tse Keh Nay 2006

"According to a Tsay Keh Dene Elder, the English name for Duncan Lake is associated with the story of a young Yutuwichan boy named Duncan who walked from McLeod Lake to Duncan Lake to visit his family who were wintering around the Lake. Another explanation is given by Joe Bob Patrick, who says his father named the lake after his good friend Duncan Pierre from Ingenika (Jennifer Hill, 2005 cited in Dewhirst, 2006:54). Duncan Pierre's gravesite is reported to be at Amazay and that recent archaeological research by Frank Craig suggested that site HgSq-10 "may be the final resting place of Duncan Pierre"(Craig 2006)."

— CEAA 2007

Amazay Lake was the calving ground for caribou in the month of May.

"There was so much caribou up there. Amazay Lake they call it because there's lots of caribou around that area. They say about 300. Sometimes, they say they all go around it. Now there's nothing. You go there and nothing. They don't see nothing anywhere around that area."

— Tse Keh Nay 2006

== See also ==
- List of lakes of British Columbia
