= Mount Thomlinson =

Mountain in the country of Canada

- Location within British Columbia

Highest point
- Elevation: 2,451 m (8,041 ft)
- Prominence: 1,661 m (5,449 ft)
- Parent peak: Shelagyote Peak (2472 m)
- Isolation: 48.8 km (30.3 mi)
- Listing: Mountains of British Columbia; Canada prominent peaks 88th
- Coordinates: 55°32′36″N 127°29′12″W

Geography
- Location: British Columbia, Canada
- District: Cassiar Land District
- Parent range: Babine Range
- Topo map: NTS 93M11 Gunanoot Lake

Climbing
- First ascent: July 25, 1965 by George and Frances Whitmore

Mount Thomlinson is a mountain in the Babine Range of the Skeena Mountains in northern British Columbia, Canada, located at the head of Thomlinson Creek, southeast of the junction of Babine River and Skeena River and north of Hazelton. It has a prominence of 1,661 m (5,449 ft), created by the Babine-Stuart Pass, thus making it one of Canada's many Ultra peaks. Thomlinson is one of the most isolated mountains of Canada.
