= Skeena Mountains =

Mountains in British Columbia, Canada

- The Skeenas
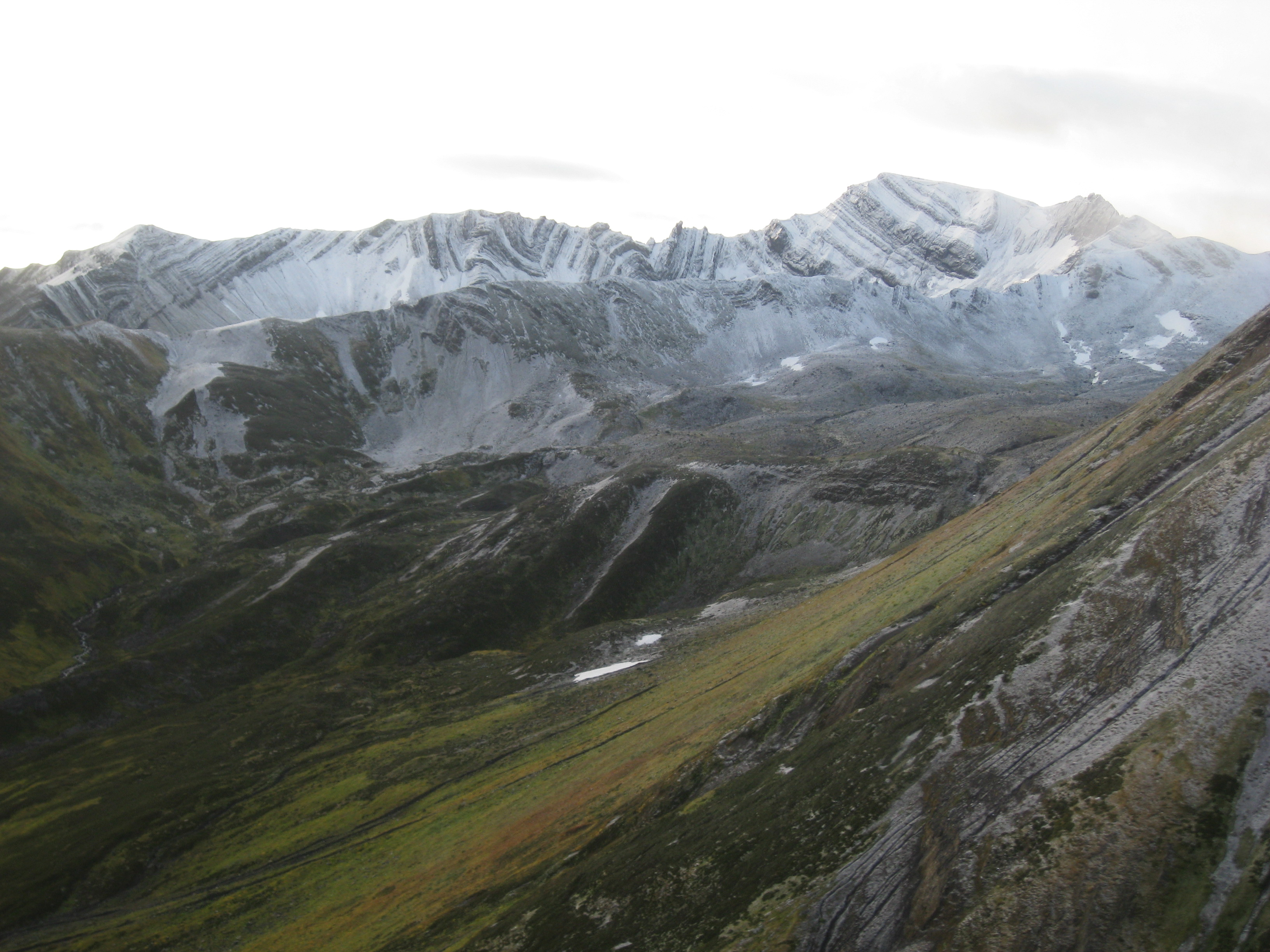

Highest point
- Peak: Shedin Peak
- Elevation: 2,579 m (8,461 ft)
- Coordinates: 55°56′21″N 127°28′48″W

Dimensions
- Area: 32,846 km^{2} (12,682 mi^{2})

Geography
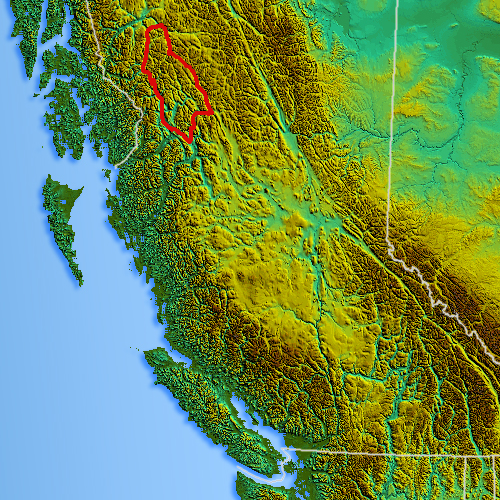
- Location map of the Skeena Mountains
- Country: Canada
- Province: British Columbia
- Parent range: Interior Mountains

The Skeena Mountains, also known as the Skeenas, are a subrange of the Interior Mountains of northern British Columbia, Canada, essentially flanking the upper basin of the Skeena River. They lie just inland from the southern end of the Boundary Ranges of the Coast Mountains, and from the northern end of the Kitimat Ranges, another subrange of the Coast Mountains. Their southern limit is described by the Bulkley River and the upper northwestern reaches of Babine and Takla Lakes. To the northeast, their boundary is marked by the upper reaches of the Omineca River.

To the north, the Skeenas abut the southern Tahltan Highland and Klastline Plateau, part of the southern reaches of the Stikine Plateau, and the Spatsizi Plateau, another subplateau of the Stikine. To the northwest, across the narrow confines of the Spatsizi Plateau, are the Stikine Ranges of the Cassiar Mountains, while to the east of the Skeenas are the Omineca Mountains. To the south lie the Hazelton Mountains.

== Sub-ranges and mountains ==
- Atna Range, bounded by Shedin Creek, Shelagyote Creek, and Babine River.
  - Shedin Peak, highest summit of the Atna Range, 2,588 m (8,491 ft).
- Babine Range, between Babine Lake, Babine River, Bulkley River and Skeena River.
  - Mount Thomlinson
  - Sidina Mountain
  - Mount Thoen
  - Nine Mile Mountain
  - Netalzul Mountain
  - Mount Seaton
  - Mount Cronin
- Bait Range, on the west side of northern Takla Lake.
  - Bait Peak, highest summit of the Bait Range, 2,286 m (7,500 ft).
  - Mount Lovel
  - Mount Teegee
  - Frypan Peak
  - Trail Peak
- Driftwood Range, between the headwaters of Driftwood River and Nilkitkwa River.
  - Driftwood Peak, highest summit of the Driftwood Range, 2,027 m (6,650 ft).
  - Skutsil Knob
- Klappan Range, between the Klappan River and Iskut River.
  - Maitland Volcano
  - Todagin Mountain
  - Tsatia Mountain
- Oweegee Range, on the east side of Bell-Irving River.
  - Mount Skowill
  - Delta Peak
  - Mount Klayduc
- Sicintine Range, south of the Skeena River between Sicintine River and Squingula River.
  - Shelagyote Peak, highest summit of the Sicintine Range, 2,472 m (8,110 ft).
  - Nilkitkwa Peak
  - Mount Horetzky
- Slamgeesh Range, between the Skeena River and Slamgeesh River.
  - Notchtop Peak
  - Stephen Peak
  - Foster Peak
- Strata Range, between the Bell-Irving River, Taylor River, Taft Creek and Nass River.
- Takla Range, bounded by Takla Lake and Northwest Arm.
  - Boling Peak
  - Base Peak
  - Spike Peak

== See also ==
- Sacred Headwaters
- Mosque River
