= Shedin Peak =

Mountain in British Columbia, Canada

- Location within British Columbia

Highest point
- Elevation: 2,588 m (8,491 ft)
- Prominence: 1,798 m (5,899 ft)
- Listing: Mountains of British Columbia; Canada prominent peaks 59th; Canada most isolated peaks 49th
- Coordinates: 55°56′21″N 127°28′48″W

Geography
- Location: British Columbia, Canada
- District: Cassiar Land District
- Parent range: Atna Range
- Topo map: NTS 93M14 Shelagyote Peak

Shedin Peak is the highest mountain in the Atna Range and in the Skeena Mountains of northern British Columbia, Canada, located 77 km (48 mi) north of Hazelton at the head of Rosenthal Creek. It has a prominence of 1,798 m (5,899 ft), created by the Bear-Driftwood Pass.

== See also ==
- List of Ultras of North America
- List of the most prominent summits of North America

== Sources ==
- "Shedin Peak". BC Geographical Names. Government of British Columbia – B.C. Geographical Names Office (BCGNO).
- Shedin Peak in the Canadian Mountain Encyclopedia
- "Shedin Peak, British Columbia" on Peakbagger
