= Caribou Hide, British Columbia =

Caribou Hide Metsantan
- Former location of Caribou Hide in British Columbia
- Coordinates: 57°27′00″N 127°33′00″W
- Country: Canada
- Province: British Columbia

Caribou Hide, also known as Metsantan, is a former community of the Sekani people in the Spatsizi Plateau region of the Stikine Country in northwestern British Columbia, Canada, just northwest of Metsantan Lake. The name derives from a "white man's" term for the Sekani, "the Caribou Hide people", with this place being named accordingly, because this was their first settlement in this region. The name was conferred on this place in 1944, first appearing on maps in 1933, and rescinded in 1982. Another designation for this place was Metsantan, which "Caribou Hide" replaced in 1952. The Sekani name is Wadzih Zùs, meaning "Caribou Hide (village)". By 1969, the remaining buildings were collapsing.

== See also ==
- Metsantan Range
- Metsantan Pass
