= Horseranch Range =

Mountain range in British Columbia, Canada

- Location within British Columbia

Highest point
- Coordinates: 59°22′00″N 128°49′00″W

Geography
- Location: British Columbia and Yukon
- Parent range: Dease Plateau

The Horseranch Range is a 40 km (25 mi) long north–south trending mountain range in northern British Columbia, Canada, located at the head of the Red River to the northwest of Deadwood Lake. Part of the Dease Plateau of either the Yukon Plateau or Cassiar Mountains system, it contains no glaciers and lies completely above tree line.

== See also ==
- Liard Plain
- Interior Mountains
