= Kispiox Mountain =

Mountain in British Columbia, Canada

- Location within British Columbia
- Interactive map of Kispiox Mountain

Highest point
- Elevation: 2,096 m (6,877 ft)
- Prominence: 1,561 m (5,121 ft)
- Listing: Mountains of British Columbia; Canada prominent peaks 117th
- Coordinates: 55°23′54.7″N 127°56′36.4″W

Geography
- Location: British Columbia, Canada
- District: Cassiar Land District
- Parent range: Kispiox Range
- Topo map: NTS 93M5 Hazelton

Kispiox Mountain is the highest mountain in the Kispiox Range of the Hazelton Mountains in northern British Columbia, Canada, located northwest of the junction of Kispiox River and Skeena River. It has a prominence of 1,561 m (5,121 ft), created by the Kispiox-Nass Pass, thus making it one of Canada's many ultra-prominent peaks.

== See also ==
- List of the most prominent summits of North America
