= Bell-Irving River =

River in British Columbia

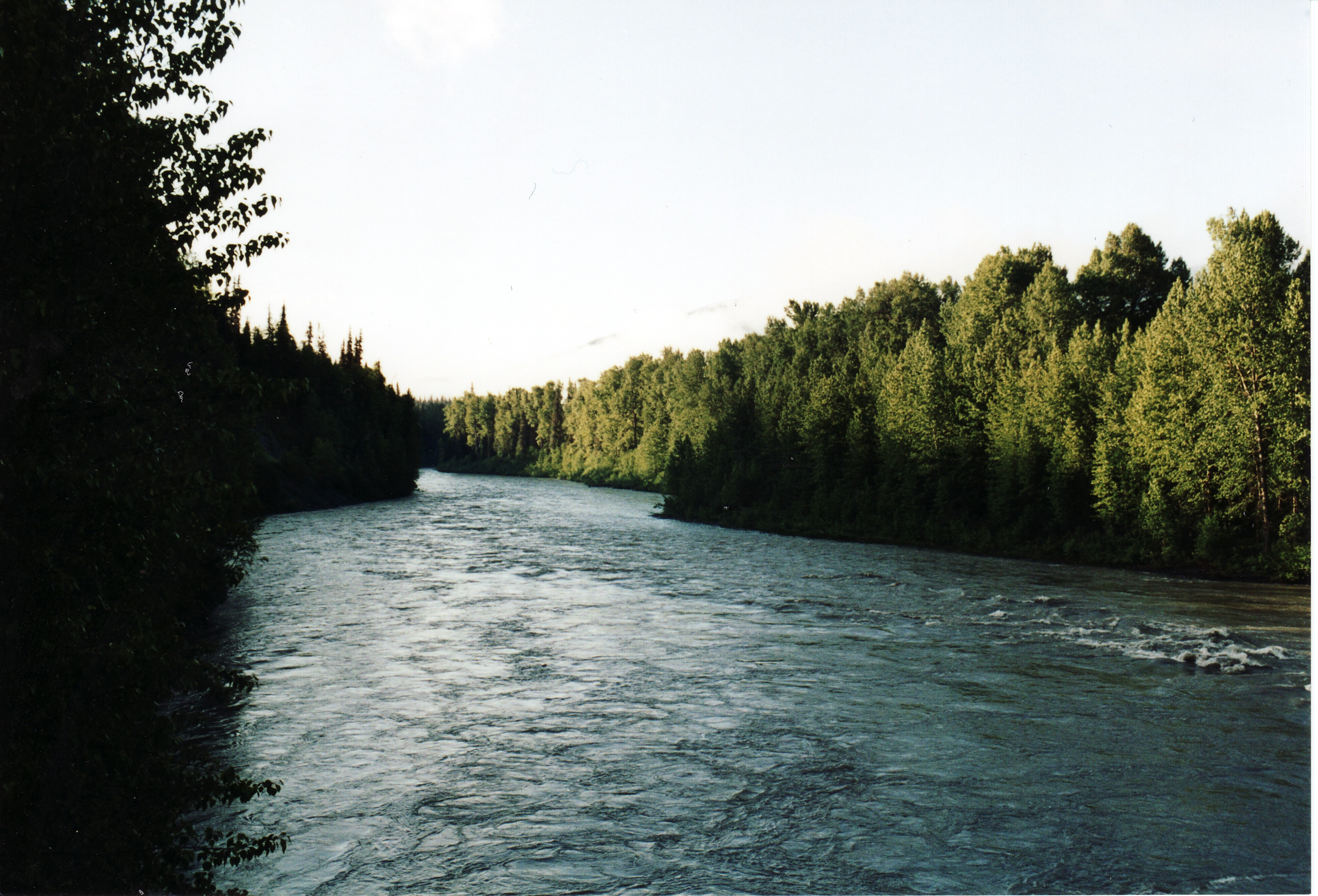

- Mouth of Bell-Irving River
- Etymology: Duncan Peter Bell-Irving

Location
- Country: Canada
- Province: British Columbia
- District: Cassiar Land District

Physical characteristics
- Source: Klappan Range
  - location: Cassiar Land District, British Columbia, Northern Interior
  - coordinates: 57°8′30″N 129°28′19″W
  - elevation: 1,800 m (5,900 ft)
- Mouth: Nass River
  - location: Cassiar Land District, British Columbia, Northern Interior
  - coordinates: 56°9′51″N 129°1′42″W
  - elevation: 267 m (876 ft)
- Length: 165 km (103 mi)

The Bell-Irving River is a tributary of the Nass River in northwestern British Columbia, Canada. It originates in the Sacred Headwaters region, and flows about 165 km (103 mi) south to the Nass River. It course lies between the Oweegee Range of the Skeena Mountains to the east and the Boundary Ranges of the Coast Mountains to the west.

The Bell-Irving River's watershed is within the traditional territory of several First Nations and there have been conflicting claims. The main peoples whose histories involve the Bell-Irving River are the Gitxsan (also spelled Gitksan), Gitanyow, Nisga'a, Tahltan, and Tsetsaut.

== Name ==
The river's name honors Canadian Army Lieutenant Duncan Peter Bell-Irving, BCLS, of Vancouver. Before World War I Bell-Irving was exploring and surveying the upper Nass River system. When war broke out he enlisted and served with the 2nd Field Company, Canadian Engineers. On February 25, 1915, in Belgium, he was shot and killed by a sniper.

There are various indigenous names for the Bell-Irving River. The Gitxsan name is Sto'ot Xsitxemsem. The Tahltan have been known to call the Bell-Irving River the West Nass River.

== Course ==
The Bell-Irving River originates in the Klappan Range and an area known as the Sacred Headwaters, which gives rise to not just the Bell-Irving, but also the Nass, Skeena, and Stikine Rivers, as well as numerous tributary streams such as the Klappan River, Tumeka Creek, and Sweeney Creek, tributaries of the Klappan River; and the Ningunsaw River, a tributary of the Iskut River. The source of the Unuk River is just southwest of the Sacred Headwaters area, rising near the source of Treaty Creek, a tributary of the Bell-Irving River. North of the Bell-Irving River lies the watersheds of the Stikine River and its largest tributary, the Iskut River. To the west of the Bell-Irving are the Coast Mountains and the headwaters of the Unuk River, which flows southwest to the sea near Ketchikan, Alaska, and the Bear River, which flows south to the head of Portland Canal at the community of Stewart, British Columbia.

From its source the Bell-Irving River flows generally south through mostly mountainous terrain. It is joined by Craven Creek, then Rochester Creek. The Yukon Telegraph Trail follows Rochester Creek and part of the Bell-Irving River. The Yukon Telegraph line, also called the Dominion Telegraph, grew out of part of the earlier, failed Russian–American Telegraph, and connected Ashcroft, BC, to Dawson City, Yukon. The telegraph trail was built during the Klondike Gold Rush and promoted as an All-Canadian Route to the Yukon gold fields.

Below Rochester Creek the Bell-Irving River flows southwest. Owl Creek, whose headwaters lie near Mount Alger, joins the Bell-Irving from the northwest. Hodder Creek joins near a locality called Bell II, where the Stewart–Cassiar Highway crosses the Bell-Irving River. Just downstream the Bell-Irving is joined by Teigen Creek from the west, whose source lies close to the source of the Unuk River. The Yukon Telegraph Trail and the Stewart–Cassiar Highway leave the Bell-Irving here and follow Teigen Creek and its tributary Snowbank Creek north to Ningunsaw Pass, then along Beaverpond Creek and the Ningunsaw River to Bob Quinn Lake and Bob Quinn Lake Airport.

Below Teigen Creek the Bell-Irving River turns south and southeast. This part of the river valley is used by the Stewart–Cassiar Highway, British Columbia Highway 37. Snowslide Range lies west of the river, between Teigen Creek and Treaty Creek. Oweegee Creek and Skowill Creek join from the east, then Treaty Creek joins from the west. Treaty Creek is so named because it marks the traditional boundary between Nisga'a and Tahltan territories, following a mid-19th century treaty made between these peoples.

Below Treaty Creek the Bell-Irving is joined by Deltaic Creek from the east, then Wildfire Creek from the west, then Taft Creek from the northeast. Continuing south, the Bell-Irving is flanked on the west by Wildfire Ridge, which separates it from Bowser Lake. Ritchie Creek and Cousins Creek, flowing down from Mount Ritchie, join the Bell-Irving from the east. A few kilometers south the Bell-Irving River is joined by the Bowser River from the west. The Bowser River flows from Summit Lake and through Bowser Lake, and collects water from many large glaciers.

South of the Bowser River confluence the Stewart–Cassiar Highway crosses the Bell-Irving River again and leaves the river valley, heading south while the river bends to the southeast, around the east side of Mount Bell-Irving. Irving Creek joins the river from the northeast, after which the Bell-Irving River heads south to its confluence with the Nass River, a few kilometers east of Meziadin Junction.

== Wildlife ==
The Bell-Irving River and its tributaries support diverse fish communities. They are used for spawning by Chinook salmon, Coho salmon, and Sockeye salmon, and by summer-run anadromous (sea-run) Steelhead trout and Cutthroat trout. They also provide habitat for resident (non-anadromous) Rainbow trout and Cutthroat trout, Dolly Varden trout, Bull trout, and Mountain whitefish.

Eulachon, a small anadromous fish, was historically extremely important to the indigenous people of the Pacific Northwest Coast, and the Nass River was particularly famous for its eulachon runs. However, eulachon distribution is primarily restricted to the lower reaches of the Nass River and does not extend to the Bell-Irving River.

Some terrestrial species of the Bell-Irving River watershed include marten, moose, mountain goat, grizzly bear, western toad, and wetland birds including waterfowl and wading birds such as dabbling duckss, geese, common goldeneye, and harlequin duck.

== History ==
The Bell-Irving River's watershed is within the traditional territory of several First Nations and there have been conflicting claims. The main peoples whose histories involve the Bell-Irving River are the Gitxsan (also spelled Gitksan), Gitanyow, Nisga'a, Tahltan, and Tsetsaut.

The Gitxsan adaawk, a type of oral history, describe thousands of years of history. Migrations into the postglacial Nass River basin occurred from three main settlements, including one, called Ts'im'anluuskeexs, on the Bell-Irving River between the Bowser River and Treaty Creek. Some of the Ts'im'anluuskeexs migrated south, establishing the Houses of the Gitanyou. Others remained and established the Houses of the Galdo'o.

Starting about 200–300 years ago a series of conflicts occurred between the Gitxsan and groups of Tsetsaut, Tahltan, and others. These conflicts were long and complicated, and occurred in several distinct phases over a large area, including the Bell-Irving River watershed. Some of the conflicts related to geopolitical changes caused by the increasing presence of European and American maritime fur traders on the coast.

One conflict between the Gitanyow and Tsetsaut resulted in the defeat of the Tsetsaut and a formal transfer of territory including most of the Bell-Irving River and its tributaries, as well as the upper Nass River and other areas. By around 1860 the Eastern Tsetsaut had established a village called Awiijii (or Oweegee) on the Bell-Irving River near Bowser Lake. Gitxsan adaawk describe an accidental killing of the Gitxsan chief Xskiigmlaxha, which resulted in the Eastern Tsetsaut of Awiijii having to forfeit a large part of their territory in the area to the nephews of the dead Gitxsan chief. In this way much of the Bell-Irving River watershed became Gitxsan territory, according to Gitxsan adaawk. The name of Treaty Creek, near Awiijii, comes from this event. By the time Franz Boas wrote about the Eastern Tsetsaut in the 1890s they had relocated to the upper Stikeen River.

This transfer of territory is particularly well documented and important for the Gitxsan and Gitanyow's efforts to acquire aboriginal title to their lands. However, the Skii km Lax Ha, present-day descendants of the Raven Clan of the Laxwiiyip Tsetsaut who have not been amalgamated with the Nisga'a like many other Tsetsaut, claim the entire Bell-Irving River watershed along with the upper Nass River and other areas.

Land claim disagreement between the Gitxsan and Nisga'a led to the Gitxsan and their neighbors, the Wet'suwet'en, to take the issue of territorial ownership to court in the case of Delgamuukw v British Columbia. This case began in 1984 and continued until 1997. Although the Supreme Court of Canada declined to make any definitive statement on aboriginal title a vast amount of research was conducted and documented and it was ruled that oral histories were just as important as written testimony. The case also played an important role in the Nisga'a Treaty, which came into effect on May 11, 2000, and affirmed Nisga'a ownership of lands focused along the lower Nass River.

As of 2017, neither the Gitxsan nor the Gitanyow have not reached final treaty agreements. Their claims include much of the Bell-Irving River watershed.

== Geology ==
The Bell-Irving volcanic district is located in the upper Bell-Irving River watershed. It is considered part of the Northern Cordilleran Volcanic Province.

Between 1992 and 2004 fourteen previously undescribed volcanic occurrences were found, documented, and assigned to the Bell-Irving volcanic district. All fourteen have pillow lava deposits and/or volcaniclastic rocks, and were probably created by Pleistocene alpine glaciovolcanic eruptions.

== See also ==
- List of rivers of British Columbia
