= Klappan Mountain =

Mountain in British Columbia, Canada

Coordinates: 57°12′33″N 128°50′04″W

Klappan Mountain, 2019m (6624ft), prominence 414m, is a mountain of the Klappan Range in northwestern British Columbia, Canada.

== See also ==
- Sacred Headwaters
- Klappan Coalbed Methane Project
- Klappan River
- Klappan Range
