= Ahtna (disambiguation) =

The Ahtna are an Alaska Native Athabaskan people of Alaska.

Ahtna or Atna may also refer to:

== Places ==
- Atna Range, a small sub-range of the Skeena Mountains in northern British Columbia, Canada
- Atna, Norway, a village in the municipality of Stor-Elvdal in Innlandet county, Norway
- Atna Peaks, an eroded shield volcano in the Wrangell Mountains of eastern Alaska
- Copper River (Alaska), also known as the Ahtna River
- Lake Atna, a proglacial lake that was in the Copper River Basin

== Other ==
- Ahtna language, the indigenous language of the Ahtna people
- Ahtna, Incorporated, an Alaska Native Regional Corporation created under the Alaska Native Claims Settlement Act of 1971
