= Driftwood Range =

Mountain range in British Columbia, Canada

- Location within British Columbia

Highest point
- Peak: Unnamed peak; unofficially Driftwood Peak
- Elevation: 2,027 m (6,650 ft)
- Coordinates: 55°54′06.8″N 126°40′23.9″W

Geography
- Country: Canada
- Province: British Columbia
- Parent range: Skeena Mountains

The Driftwood Range is a small subrange of the Skeena Mountains of the Interior Mountains, located between the headwaters of Driftwood River and Nilkitkwa River in northern British Columbia, Canada.

== Mountains ==
Mountains within the Driftwood Range include:

- Driftwood Peak
- Skutsil Knob
