= Mount Cronin =

Mountain in the country of Canada

- Location within British Columbia
- Interactive map of Mount Cronin

Highest point
- Elevation: 2,396 m (7,861 ft)
- Prominence: 1,571 m (5,154 ft)
- Parent peak: Mount Thomlinson (2451 m)
- Listing: Mountains of British Columbia; Canada prominent peaks 114th
- Coordinates: 54°55′48″N 126°51′50″W

Geography
- Location: British Columbia, Canada
- District: Range 5 Coast Land District
- Parent range: Babine Range
- Topo map: NTS 93L15 Driftwood Creek

Mount Cronin is a mountain in the Babine Range of the Skeena Mountains in northern British Columbia, Canada, located at the head of Cronin Creek in Babine Mountains Provincial Park just northeast of Smithers. It has a prominence of 1,571 m (5,154 ft), created by the Harold Price-Fulton Pass, making it one of Canada's Ultra peaks. The mountain was named after James Cronin, who operated a mine on this mountain in the 19th century.
