= Strata Range =

Mountain range in British Columbia, Canada

- Location within British Columbia

Geography
- Country: Canada
- Province: British Columbia
- Range coordinates: 56°24′N 129°05′W
- Parent range: Skeena Mountains

The Strata Range is a subrange of the Skeena Mountains located between the Bell-Irving River and the Taylor River in northern British Columbia, Canada.
