= Babine Range =

Mountain range in the country of Canada

- Location within British Columbia

Dimensions
- Area: 4,076 km^{2} (1,574 mi^{2})

Geography
- Country: Canada
- Province: British Columbia
- Range coordinates: 55°16′N 127°15′W
- Parent range: Skeena Mountains
- Topo map: NTS 93M6 Suskwa River

The Babine Range is a small subrange of the Skeena Mountains of the Interior Mountains, located between Babine Lake, Babine River, Bulkey River and Skeena River in northern British Columbia, Canada. The name, Babine, is of French origin.

== Mountains ==
Mountains within the Babine Range include:

- Mount Thomlinson
- Sidina Mountain
- Mount Thoen
- Nine Mile Mountain
- Netalzul Mountain
- Mount Seaton
- Mount Cronin
