= The Scattering of Man =

- Athapascan languages: DƏNE YI’INJETL
- Directed by: Luke Gleeson
- Written by: Luke Gleeson
- Produced by: Luke Gleeson
- Cinematography: Yves Gründler; Tim Loubier
- Edited by: Yves Gründler; Tim Loubier
- Music by: David James McLeod
- Production company: Mesilinka Films
- Release date: October 25, 2021 (Paradise Theatre)
- Running time: 75 minutes
- Country: Canada
- Languages: English, Sekani

The Scattering of Man (Sekani: DƏNE YI’INJETL) is a Canadian documentary film, directed by Luke Gleeson and released in 2021. The film profiles the Tsay Keh Dene First Nation, centring on the destruction of their traditional community following the construction of the W. A. C. Bennett Dam in the 1960s.

It was produced by Mesilinka Films, a co-operative film studio launched by Gleeson and his colleagues, and funded entirely by the Tsay Keh Dene.

The film premiered on October 25, 2021, in a screening at the Paradise Theatre in Toronto, and was later screened at documentary film festivals including the 2021 Montreal International Documentary Festival (RIDM) and the 2022 DOXA Documentary Film Festival.

At DOXA, the film received an honorable mention from the Colin Low Award jury.

The film was added to the CBC Gem streaming platform in 2023.
