= Liard Plateau =

Coordinates: 59°40′00″N 125°30′00″W

The Liard Plateau is a plateau in far northern British Columbia, Canada, located between the Smith and Liard Rivers, and extending north into the Yukon.

== See also ==
- List of physiogeographic regions of British Columbia
- Geography of British Columbia
- Liard Plain
