= Taylor River =

Taylor River may refer to:

- Taylor River (Colorado), United States
- Taylor River (New Hampshire), United States
- Taylor River, New Zealand
- Taylor River (Washington), United States
- Taylor River (British Columbia), Canada
