= Red River (British Columbia) =

Coordinates: 59°28′00″N 127°40′00″W

The Red River is a tributary of the Kechika River in the far north of British Columbia, Canada, flowing east to meet the Kechika from headwaters in the Cassiar Mountains. In its middle reaches it forms the boundary between the Dease Plateau (N) and the Cassiar Mountains (S) and for its final stretch it crosses part of the Liard Plain. It is crossed by an unnamed road about 17.5 kilometres (10.9 mi) upstream from its confluence with the Kechika, and is just to the north of Aeroplane Lake.

== See also ==
- List of rivers in British Columbia
