= Maitland Volcano =

Extinct volcano in British Columbia, Canada

Coordinates: 57°24′N 129°42′W

- Location within British Columbia
- Interactive map of Maitland Volcano

Geography
- Country: Canada
- Province: British Columbia
- District: Cassiar Land District
- Parent range: Klappan Range

Geology
- Rock age: 5.2 to 4.7 million years old
- Mountain type: Shield volcano
- Volcanic zone: Northern Cordilleran Volcanic Province
- Last eruption: 4.6 million years ago

Maitland Volcano is a heavily eroded shield volcano in the Northern Interior of British Columbia, Canada. It is 83 km (52 mi) southeast of the small community of Telegraph Creek in what is now the Klappan Range of the northern Skeena Mountains. This multi-vent volcano covered a remarkably large area and was topped by a younger volcanic edifice. Little remains of Maitland Volcano today, limited only to eroded lava flows and distinctive upstanding landforms created when magma hardened within the vents of the volcano.

The shield is associated with an extensive group of related volcanoes called the Northern Cordilleran Volcanic Province (NCVP). This forms part of the much larger Ring of Fire, which surrounds most of the Pacific Ocean basin. Geologic studies have shown that Maitland was a comparatively short-lived volcano. It had volcanic activity for less than a million years, a time span unique from other massive NCVP shields. The volcano is known to have produced at least four types of lava, namely alkali basalt, hawaiite, trachyte and trachybasalt. These have been studied by scientists since the 1950s.

== Geology ==
Maitland Volcano was one of the most voluminous shield volcanoes in the Northern Cordilleran Volcanic Province along with Heart Peaks, Level Mountain and the Mount Edziza volcanic complex. Its structure was about 50 km (31 mi) long and 40 km (25 mi) wide, covering an area of at least 1,000 km^{2} (390 mi^{2}). This is similar in size to the Mount Edziza complex approximately 40 km (25 mi) west of Maitland Volcano. Like most shields, Maitland consisted of several basaltic lava flows which have low viscosity. This gave the volcano its massive profile and consequently Maitland might have had a broad lava plateau like other large NCVP shields.

Like other Northern Cordilleran volcanoes, Maitland Volcano had its origins in continental rifting—a long rupture in the Earth's crust where the lithosphere is being pulled apart. This incipient rifting formed as a result of the Pacific Plate sliding northward along the Queen Charlotte Fault, on its way to the Aleutian Trench. As the continental crust stretched, the near surface rocks fractured along steeply dipping cracks parallel to the rift known as faults. Basaltic magma rose along these fractures to create effusive eruptions. The rift zone has existed for at least 14.9 million years and has created the Northern Cordilleran Volcanic Province. This geologic province forms part of the Ring of Fire, an area where large numbers of earthquakes and volcanic eruptions occur along the Pacific Ocean.

=== Volcanic history ===
Maitland's volcanic history is poorly known since only isolated remnants of the volcano remain. What is known, however, is that it formed during a pulse of NCVP magmatism that began with the eruption of Edziza about seven million years ago. The eruption rate of this period was much greater than what is observed for the Northern Cordilleran Volcanic Province today. Following the onset of activity at Edziza, Maitland volcanism commenced 5.2 million years ago with the outpouring of alkali basalt and hawaiite lava on a broad, late Tertiary, low-relief surface. This resulted in the creation of a broad shield volcano. Subsequent volcanic activity created a complex edifice of trachyte and trachybasalt that formerly overlain the central part of the basaltic shield. Magmatism at Maitland continued until about 4.6 million years ago when the volcano went extinct.

Volcanic activity at Maitland Volcano was consistent with extensional stresses across the northern Canadian Cordillera that began around 10 million years ago as a result of new plate motions between the Pacific and North American plates. This contributed to lithospheric thinning and decompression melting of OIB-like mantle to produce alkaline Neogene magmatism. The time span of 600,000 years for magmatism at Maitland Volcano is relatively small compared to other large NCVP shield volcanoes. This supports field evidence for rapid, relatively uninterrupted growth of the volcanic edifice. The suspension of Maitland volcanism corresponds with changes in regional tectonics about four million years ago.

=== Erosion and dissection ===
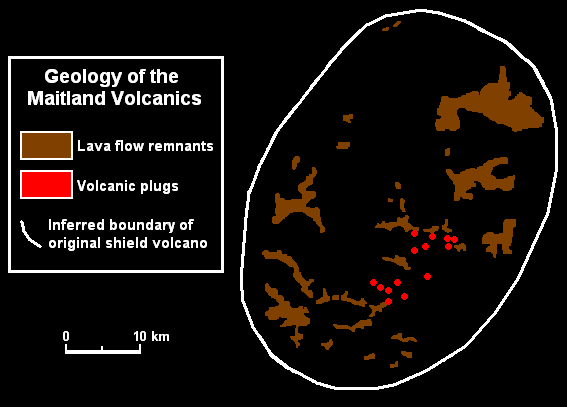
Diagram of the remains of Maitland Volcano

After Maitland Volcano became extinct, prolonged erosion destroyed the volcanic edifice. The reason why Maitland eroded away while its neighbour, Edziza, did not is twofold. With the cessation of volcanic activity, Maitland Volcano was unable to protect itself from erosion by providing a cover of younger lavas on top of the older shield. Another factor is that Maitland's basement was built entirely of soft, friable sedimentary rocks of the Bowser Lake Group. Such rocks are more vulnerable to erosion than igneous rocks. The Bowser Lake Group sedimentary rocks are shale, sandstone, conglomerate and siltstone, which were deposited in marine and non-marine environments during the Jurassic and Cretaceous periods. Intervening valleys, deeply incised into the Jurassic shale and sandstone, are as much as 600 m (2,000 ft) below the base of the now deeply eroded Maitland shield volcano. Most of the rugged topography of the Klappan Range formed after Maitland Volcano was built.

Erosional remnants of lava flows from Maitland Volcano are present as scattered, cliff-bounded cappings on higher mountains of the Klappan Range. These flat-lying lava caps are up to 400 m (1,300 ft) thick and contain as much as 20 separate lava flow units, each commonly 2 to 20 m (6.6 to 65.6 ft) thick. Aphyric to slightly feldspar-phyric basalt is the primary volcanic rock, although greenish-grey trachybasalt and pale green trachyte form the uppermost flows of thick sections. The highest remnant of Maitland Volcano has an elevation of 2,514 m (8,248 ft).

A cluster of 14 volcanic plugs are exposed that were originally under the central part of Maitland Volcano. These form steep-sided, isolated monoliths that reach heights of 150 m (490 ft) above the surrounding eroded terrain. They are circular to elliptical in shape, ranging in diameter from 100 to 250 m (330 to 820 ft). The plugs represent the principal feeders through which the Maitland lavas reached the surface. Red oxidized pyroclastic blocks surround some plugs protruding through the remaining lava flows. These probably formed not far below the surface where eruption was accompanied by vent-clearing explosions.

== Human history ==
=== Geological studies ===
The remains of Maitland Volcano were first mapped and described by the Geological Survey of Canada in 1956 as part of Operation Stikine. They recognized the volcanic rocks capping the Klappan Range as remnants of once-extensive lava flows but noted the remnants may differ in elevation by 305 m (1,001 ft) or more. As a result, they speculated that the remnants were not the remains of a continuous blanket of basaltic lava but fragments of individual flows poured out on a surface of considerable relief. These lava flow remnants were subsequently mapped in greater detail by Jack Souther in 1972 and later by Hu Gabrielse and Howard Tipper in 1984.

=== Naming ===
Maitland Volcano is the namesake for Maitland Creek, a tributary of the Klappan River that flows from the eroded basement of Maitland Volcano. Maitland Creek was in turn named on May 6, 1975 for William John Maitland of Vancouver who served as flight lieutenant in the Royal Canadian Air Force during World War II. Maitland was killed in action on December 16, 1943 while serving with 208 squadron on operations over Europe; he was 22 years old.

In 1990, Canadian volcanologist Jack Souther gave the informal name Maitland volcanics for the remaining lava flows and volcanic plugs of Maitland Volcano. Evenchick et al. (2005) proposed Maitland Volcanics as a formal name for these volcanic rocks.

== See also ==
- List of volcanoes in Canada
- Volcanology of Western Canada
