= Bell-Irving volcanic district =

The Bell-Irving volcanic district is a volcanic field in the upper Bell-Irving River watershed of northern British Columbia, Canada. It is considered part of the Northern Cordilleran Volcanic Province, consisting of 14 volcanic centres. They comprise pillow lava and/or volcaniclastic rocks, which were possibly emplaced by alpine glaciovolcanic eruptions during the Pleistocene. The volcanic deposits were discovered between 1992 and 2004 but remained undescribed until 2006.

== Occurrences ==
The Bell-Irving volcanic district includes the following:

- Adzich volcanic centre
- Owl Creek South volcanic deposits
- Owl Creek North volcanic deposits
- Rochester Creek Southwest volcanic centre
- Rochester Creek Southeast volcanic centre
- Upper Rochester Creek volcanic deposits
- Rochester Creek Northeast-South volcanic deposits
- Rochester Creek Northeast-North volcanic deposits
- Bell-Irving River East South volcanic deposit
- Bell-Irving River East North volcanic deposit
- Bell-Irving River volcanic centre
- Bell-Irving Northeast volcanic deposits
- Icefield Ridge volcanic deposit
- Craven Lake volcanic centre
