= Takla Range =

Mountain range in British Columbia, Canada

Coordinates: 55°17′00″N 125°53′00″W

- Location within British Columbia

Highest point
- Elevation: 1,654 m (5,427 ft)

Geography
- Country: Canada
- Province: British Columbia
- Parent range: Skeena Mountains

The Takla Range is a small subrange of the Skeena Mountains of the Interior Mountains, bounded by Takla Lake and Northwest Arm in northern British Columbia, Canada.
