= Gunanoot Lake =

Lake in British Columbia, Canada

- Location within British Columbia
- Location: Skeena Country, British Columbia
- Coordinates: 55°42′41″N 127°07′58″W
- Basin countries: Canada

Gunanoot Lake is a lake in the Skeena Country of the Northern Interior of British Columbia, Canada, located northeast of the town of Hazelton near the confluence of the Babine and Shelagyote Rivers. It is named for Simon Gunanoot, a Gitxsan packer, guide-outfitter and storekeeper who was accused of murder, living as a fugitive in the mountains for many years until turning himself in and being acquitted.

== See also ==
- List of lakes of British Columbia
- Mount Gunanoot
