= Kwadacha =

Kwadacha Fort Ware
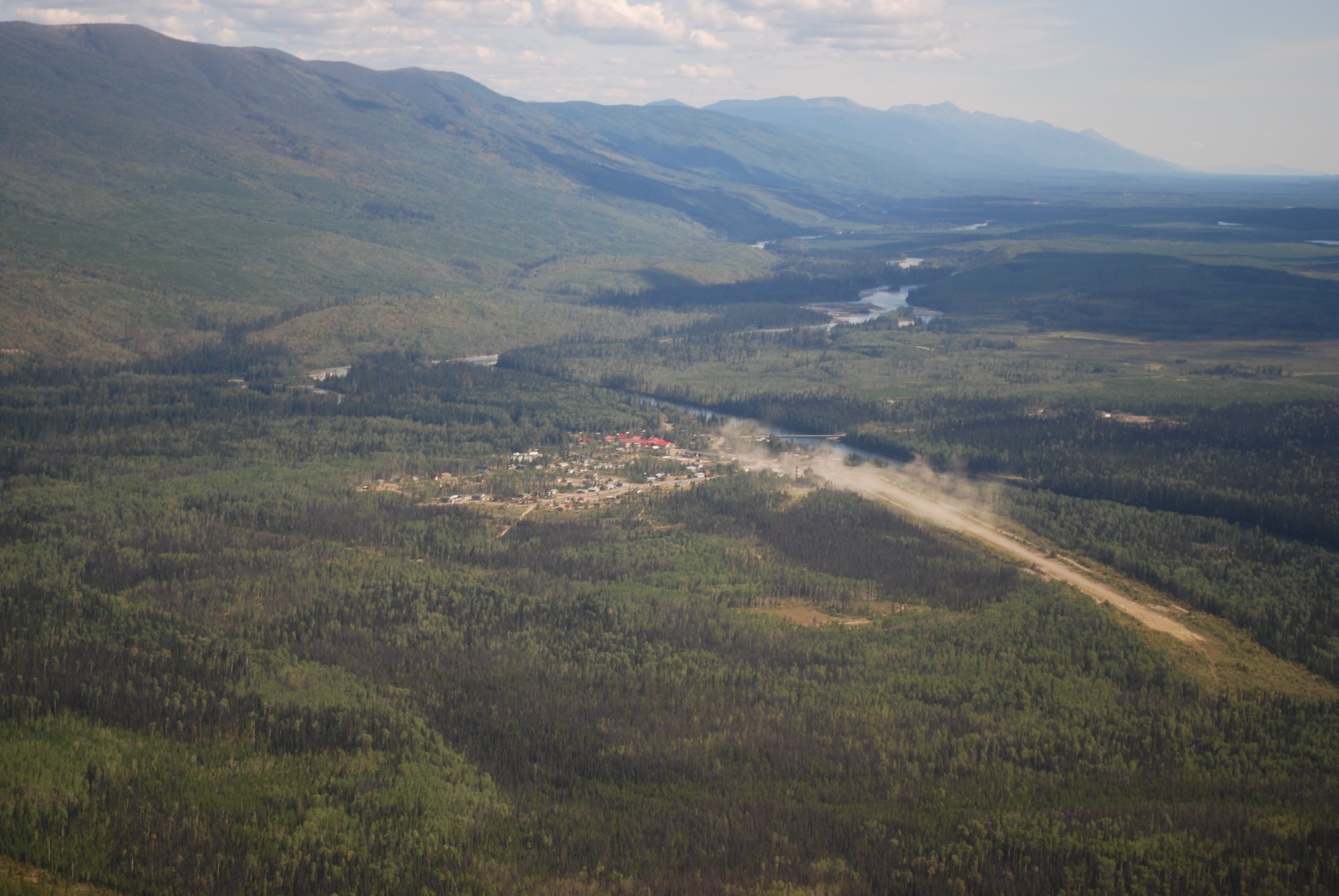
- View of Kwadacha from above looking Southeast

- Location of Kwadacha in British Columbia Kwadacha (Canada) Kwadacha (North America)
- Coordinates: 57°25′15″N 125°37′20″W
- Country: Canada
- Province: British Columbia

Population
  - Total: 350
- Area codes: 250, 778

Kwadacha, also known as Fort Ware or simply Ware, is an aboriginal community in northern British Columbia, Canada, located in the Rocky Mountain Trench at the confluence of the Finlay, Kwadacha and Fox Rivers, in the Rocky Mountain Trench upstream from the end of the Finlay Reach (north arm) of Williston Lake. The population is about 350. It is in the federal electoral riding of Prince George-Peace River.

The community is home to Kwadacha First Nation, a Sekani First Nation. Many members also have Kaska ancestry, and Kwadacha is a recognized Kaska Dena community.

== History ==
The area is part of the traditional territory of the Sekani-speaking people, the Kwadacha, and called Tahche in their language.

In 1927, the Hudson's Bay Company (HBC) established an outpost of Fort Grahame, naming it the Whitewater trading post. It was first built in Deserters Canyon farther along Finlay River, but was later relocated near the meeting of Fox, Kwadacha and Finlay Rivers. It became a "full-fledged" post in 1929. The fort introduced the local Kwadacha people to its wares as well as commercial trapping, still a mainstay of life in the region and for the Kwadacha First Nation. .

In 1938, the fort was renamed Fort Ware after William Ware (1872-1957). Ware had worked for HBC since 1895, rising from Chief Factor company store at Telegraph Creek in 1911 to the District Manager of Fur Trade (1927-1932). William reportedly portaged across Canada to set up Telegraph Creek Trading Post, meeting and hunting with Louis Riel along the way.

The HBC post was closed on 31 May 1953.

=== Flooding from Bennett Dam ===
The community of Fort Ware was relocated from its original location due to the flooding of the lower Finlay Valley by Lake Williston in the late 1960s.

Some current inhabitants of Fort Ware are relocatees (and their descendants) who formerly lived at locations (such as Finlay Forks, located at the confluence of the Finlay and Parsnip Rivers). Before the Bennett Dam was completed on the Peace River in 1967, the combined flow of the Finlay and Parsnip were the beginning of the Peace River, but which itself is now the Peace Arm of Lake Williston. Finlay Forks was one of several native communities that were flooded out during the creation of Lake Williston (British Columbia's largest lake and one of the world's largest man-made lakes).

== Infrastructure ==
=== Transportation ===
No provincial highways reach the community, but a logging road extends north from the Prince George region. A 70 km logging road connects the community with the Tsay Keh Dene village, whose people are closely related. Additionally there are a series of horse trails following the rocky mountain trench north, ending at the Alaska highway. These trails are not accessible by vehicle and thus is said to take around two weeks to traverse.

A bridge has been completed across the river that lies on the south side of the village.

The community has a small public airport known as Fort Ware Airport.

=== Communication ===
Telephone service was installed in the community by Northwestel in early 1986, connected by satellite to the long-distance network. Dial-up internet was provisioned circa 2005. There is no cellular service. Most air service and call traffic is exchanged southward to Mackenzie and Prince George.

== Geography ==
The mountains which flank the western side of the Trench northwest from Fort Ware are the Omineca Mountains, vast subgroup of the Stikine Ranges. The nearby Muskwa-Kechika Management Area and Kwadacha Wilderness Provincial Park comprise a vast and rugged alpine region spanning the northern Rockies to the north and east of Fort Ware, which are for the most part even more inaccessible than Fort Ware, as are the Omineca Ranges.

== Climate ==
Climate data for Kwadacha (Fort Ware), elevation 777 m (2,549 ft)
Month	Jan	Feb	Mar	Apr	May	Jun	Jul	Aug	Sep	Oct	Nov	Dec	Year
Record high °C (°F)	3.9 (39.0)	5.6 (42.1)	11.1 (52.0)	22.8 (73.0)	27.8 (82.0)	33.3 (91.9)	30.0 (86.0)	31.0 (87.8)	27.2 (81.0)	16.7 (62.1)	10.6 (51.1)	2.8 (37.0)	33.3 (91.9)
Mean daily maximum °C (°F)	−15.2 (4.6)	−6.4 (20.5)	1.0 (33.8)	7.8 (46.0)	14.7 (58.5)	19.4 (66.9)	21.0 (69.8)	20.1 (68.2)	14.3 (57.7)	6.0 (42.8)	−4.8 (23.4)	−11.3 (11.7)	5.6 (42.0)
Daily mean °C (°F)	−19.9 (−3.8)	−12.1 (10.2)	−6.0 (21.2)	1.3 (34.3)	6.7 (44.1)	11.4 (52.5)	13.6 (56.5)	12.8 (55.0)	7.8 (46.0)	1.1 (34.0)	−8.4 (16.9)	−15.2 (4.6)	−0.6 (31.0)
Mean daily minimum °C (°F)	−24.4 (−11.9)	−17.8 (0.0)	−13.0 (8.6)	−5.3 (22.5)	−1.4 (29.5)	3.4 (38.1)	6.2 (43.2)	5.4 (41.7)	1.2 (34.2)	−3.7 (25.3)	−12.0 (10.4)	−19.0 (−2.2)	−6.7 (20.0)
Record low °C (°F)	−48.3 (−54.9)	−44.0 (−47.2)	−39.5 (−39.1)	−20.6 (−5.1)	−8.3 (17.1)	−4.4 (24.1)	−6.1 (21.0)	−3.5 (25.7)	−10.0 (14.0)	−21.7 (−7.1)	−35.6 (−32.1)	−45.6 (−50.1)	−48.3 (−54.9)
Average precipitation mm (inches)	49.7 (1.96)	38.1 (1.50)	18.0 (0.71)	14.7 (0.58)	32.9 (1.30)	44.3 (1.74)	68.8 (2.71)	48.5 (1.91)	43.2 (1.70)	27.9 (1.10)	46.8 (1.84)	60.3 (2.37)	493.2 (19.42)
Average snowfall cm (inches)	42.1 (16.6)	30.3 (11.9)	13.7 (5.4)	6.9 (2.7)	0.1 (0.0)	0.0 (0.0)	0.0 (0.0)	0.0 (0.0)	1.2 (0.5)	9.2 (3.6)	36.0 (14.2)	47.0 (18.5)	186.5 (73.4)
Average precipitation days	10	9	5	4	7	9	13	10	10	10	10	13	110
Average snowy days	9	8	5	2	0	0	0	0	0	2	9	12	47
Source: Environment and Climate Change Canada

== See also ==
- Fort Ware Airport (CAJ9)
- Fort Ware Water Aerodrome (CAW6)
