= Deadwood River =

River in British Columbia, Canada

Coordinates: 59°24′00″N 128°13′00″W

The Deadwood River is a tributary of the Dease River in the far north of British Columbia, Canada. It forms the southeastern boundary of the Dease Plateau, which extends northward to the Yukon-British Columbia boundary and beyond.
