= Spatsizi Headwaters Provincial Park =

Provincial park in the Stikine Region of British Columbia, Canada

- IUCN category III (natural monument or feature)
- Location within British Columbia
- Interactive map of Spatsizi Headwaters Provincial Park
- Location: Stikine Region, British Columbia, Canada
- Coordinates: 57°06′00″N 128°45′00″W
- Area: 427 ha (1,060 acres)
- Established: January 25, 2001
- Governing body: BC Parks

Spatsizi Headwaters Provincial Park is a provincial park in the Stikine Region of British Columbia, Canada. It was established on January 25, 2001, to protect the headwaters of the Spatsizi River while providing recreational facilities for visitors.

== Geography ==
The park is located just east of Mount Gunanoot in the Skeena Mountains of north-central British Columbia. Here the river emerges out from the mountains to flow north through the park and on toward Spatsizi Plateau Wilderness Provincial Park.

The headwaters of the Spatsizi River is located in the traditional territory of the Tahltan First Nation.

== See also ==
- Sacred Headwaters
