= Oweegee Range =

Mountain in Canada

Coordinates: 56°40′N 129°30′W

- Location within British Columbia

Geography
- Country: Canada
- Province: British Columbia
- Parent range: Skeena Mountains

The Oweegee Range is a small subrange of the Skeena Mountains of the Interior Mountains, located on the east side of Bell-Irving River in northern British Columbia, Canada.

== Mountains ==
Mountains within the Oweegee Range include:

- Mount Skowill
- Delta Peak
- Mount Klayduc
