= Bait Range =

Mountain range in British Columbia, Canada

- Location within British Columbia

Highest point
- Peak: Unnamed peak; unofficially Bait Peak
- Elevation: 2,286 m (7,500 ft)
- Coordinates: 55°40′59.0″N 126°37′32.0″W

Dimensions
- Area: 1,710 km^{2} (660 mi^{2})

Geography
- Country: Canada
- Province: British Columbia
- Parent range: Skeena Mountains

The Bait Range is a small subrange of the Skeena Mountains of the Interior Mountains, located on the west side of northern Takla Lake in northern British Columbia, Canada.

== Mountains ==
Mountains within the Bait Range include:

- Bait Peak
- Mount Lovel
- Mount Teegee
- Frypan Peak
- Trail Peak
