= Eaglenest Range =

Mountain range in British Columbia, Canada

- Location within British Columbia

Dimensions
- Area: 2,448 km^{2} (945 mi^{2})

Geography
- Country: Canada
- Region: British Columbia
- Range coordinates: 57°35′N 129°0′W
- Parent range: Spatsizi Plateau

The Eaglenest Range is a mountain range on the west side of the Spatsizi Plateau in northern British Columbia, Canada. It has an area of 2448 km^{2} and is a subrange of the Interior Mountains which in turn form part of the Pacific Cordillera mountain system.
