= Klappan Coalbed Methane Project =

Canadian gas project

The Klappan Coalbed Methane Project is a gas project owned by Shell Canada (a subsidiary company of Royal Dutch Shell) that looks to develop the coalbed methane from an area in northern British Columbia, near the source of three rivers: the Skeena River, Nass River, and Stikine River, and also the namesake Klappan River. The area is known in environmental politics and native lore as the Sacred Headwaters, or Kablona. The project is the source of controversy and is opposed by First Nations groups and non-governmental organizations. If developed, the project will include a network of gas wells connected by roads and pipelines, as well as a pipeline to deliver the gas to market.

The British Columbia Ministry of Energy, Mines and Petroleum Resources estimates that the Klappan coal deposit could contain as much as 8.1 trillion cubic feet (230 km^{3}) of coalbed methane gas.

== History ==
=== 2004-2005 ===
In 2004, the government of British Columbia granted Shell Canada a 400,000 hectare (4,000 km2) tenure of land for coalbed methane development. In June 2004, Shell signed a Memorandum of Understanding with the Tahltan Central Council, the Chief of the Tahltan Band and the Chief of the Iskut First Nation, for coalbed methane development of the Klappan Coalbed Methane Project. In the winter of 2004, Shell drilleds three exploration wells, and detected the presence of coalbed methane gas. The company also conducted a seismic survey over an 84 kilometres (52 mi) stretch of existing railway bed.

== Opposition ==
=== 2006 ===
Shell canceled its 2006 drilling program in response to opposition from First Nations groups. In April 2007, Royal Dutch Shell acquired Shell Canada making it a wholly owned subsidiary. Tahltan elders from Iskut and Telegraph Creek blockaded Shell's road access to the area. Shell would unsuccessfully seek a court injunction that would allow them to have the Royal Canadian Mounted Police arrest the blockaders. Shell's crews manage to access the area and begin road repairs.

=== 2007 ===
On July 27, 2007, a group of 13 environmental non-governmental organizations wrote a letter to Shell's executives in the Hague, urging them to suspend drilling plans in the Sacred Headwaters. Signatories to the letter include Natural Resources Defense Council, Greenpeace, Friends of the Earth International, ForestEthics, Sierra Club, and the David Suzuki Foundation. On August 31, 2007, rallies were held across British Columbia, including one outside the Vancouver Courthouse, where Tahltan blockaders and Shell were scheduled to appear at an injunction hearing, with David Suzuki speaking at the rally. In September, Friends of the Earth International, Greenpeace and other non-governmental organizations ran advertisements in the Financial Times with the headline "This Time It's Canada", and a photo of the Tahltan road blockade.

=== 2008 ===
The Chiefs of the Gitxsan Nation, located downstream in the Skeena watershed, called for the immediate suspension of coalbed methane exploration in the Sacred Headwaters. In April, the Outdoor Recreation Council of BC included the Sacred Headwaters in its annual listing of British Columbia's most threatened rivers. In May 2008, the Sacred Headwaters Summit attendees pledge to stand together to stop Shell's project and concerned citizens from British Columbia traveled to Shell's Annual General Meeting in the Hague to protest the company's activities in the Sacred Headwaters. A resolution opposing Shell's drilling plans was officially endorsed by the Kitimat-Stikine Regional District, Skeena Queen Charlotte Regional District, United Fishermen and Allied Workers' Union, the village of Hazelton, British Columbia, the Town of Smithers and more than half a dozen First Nations band councils. A four-year exploration moratorium was imposed by the province in 2008, to be reviewed in 2012.

=== 2012 ===
On December 13, the government of British Columbia ended the prospect of natural gas development in the region as part of a tripartite agreement with the Tahltan and Shell. It acknowledged that the Klappan has been identified by the Tahltan as having significant cultural, spiritual and social values, and also includes the vital salmon-bearing Skeena, Nass and Stikine rivers.

Shell Canada president Lorraine Mitchelmore said the company would be focusing its B.C. development strategy in the province's northeast.
