= Slamgeesh Range =

Mountain range in British Columbia, Canada

- Location within British Columbia

Geography
- Country: Canada
- Province: British Columbia
- Range coordinates: 56°25′N 127°45′W
- Parent range: Skeena Mountains

The Slamgeesh Range is a small subrange of the Skeena Mountains of the Interior Mountains, located between the Skeena River and Slamgeesh River in northern British Columbia, Canada. The Mosque River, a tributary of the Skeena, flows through the Slamgeesh Range.
