= Shelagyote Peak =

Mountain peak in British Columbia, Canada

- Location within British Columbia

Highest point
- Elevation: 2,472 m (8,110 ft)
- Prominence: 1,467 m (4,813 ft)
- Listing: Mountains of British Columbia
- Coordinates: 55°57′18″N 127°12′22″W

Geography
- Location: British Columbia, Canada
- District: Cassiar Land District
- Parent range: Sicintine Range
- Topo map: NTS 93M14 Shelagyote Peak

Shelagyote Peak is the highest mountain in the Sicintine Range of the Skeena Mountains in northern British Columbia, Canada, located at the head of Barger Creek. It has a very large prominence of 1,467 m (4,813 ft), created by the Shelagyote Pass.
