= Klappan Range =

Mountain range in British Columbia, Canada

- Location within British Columbia
- Interactive map of Klappan Range

Geography
- Country: Canada
- Province: British Columbia
- Range coordinates: 57°15′N 129°45′W
- Parent range: Skeena Mountains

The Klappan Range is a small subrange of the Skeena Mountains of the Interior Mountains, located between Klappan River and Iskut River in northern British Columbia, Canada.

== Mountains ==
Mountains within the Klappan Range include:

- Todagin Mountain
- Tsatia Mountain
- Klappan Mountain

== Protected areas ==
- Todagin South Slope Provincial Park
- Todagin Wildlife Management Area

== See also ==
- Tahltan First Nation
- Sacred Headwaters
