= Nilkitkwa River =

Northern British Columbian river in Canada

Coordinates: 55.6660°N 126.7701°W

The Nilkitkwa River is a river in northern British Columbia, Canada. It flows south into the Babine River north of Nilkitkwa Lake.

== See also ==
- List of rivers of British Columbia
