= Spatsizi Plateau Wilderness Provincial Park =

Provincial park in British Columbia, Canada

- IUCN category Ib (wilderness area)
- Location within British Columbia
- Interactive map of Spatsizi Plateau Wilderness Provincial Park
- Location: Kitimat-Stikine and Stikine Region, British Columbia, Canada
- Nearest town: Iskut
- Coordinates: 57°25′00″N 128°30′00″W
- Area: 698,659 ha (2,697.54 sq mi)
- Established: December 3, 1975
- Governing body: BC Parks

Spatsizi Plateau Wilderness Provincial Park is located in the northern portion of British Columbia, Canada, approximately 698, 659 hectares and encompasses the Spatsizi River and Gladys Lake Ecological Reserve. The park is a designated protected area that is intended for the conservation and research on caribou, grizzly bears, fish, and other wildlife species populations. Before the provincial park's establishment in 1975, the area was a historical hunting ground for local Indigenous communities like the Tahltan First Nations. It is the second largest provincial park in British Columbia.

== History ==
Spatsizi is derived from the Sekani phrase (Tahltan First Nation/Dene Language), meaning the "red goat" since the mountain goats that reside in the area roll in iron-oxide dust, colouring them in an earthy red tone. During the early 18th to late 19th century, there were two known early explorations of Spatsizi conducted by Samuel Black and P. M. Monkton. Samuel Black, the chief trader for the Hudson Bay Company, crossed the Finlay-Stikine divide in 1824, and in 1935, the B.C. Government surveyor P. M. Monkton explored and analyzed the upper Stikine. After the late 19th century, individuals like prospectors, hunters, and trappers explored the area for resources, and the Hyland Brothers established a post by the Spatsizi River. The trading post is known as the Hyland Post, and it was used to trade with native Indigenous trappers, but it was later abandoned in a few years.

In 1948, Tommy Walker built a camp at the northwest end of Coldfish Lake, purchasing property at the lake and the Hyland Post. Furthermore, Walker recruited the services of the Caribou Hide to act as hunting guides starting in 1949 all the way to 1968 due to Walker's departure.

With Walker's departure, the outfitter guide operation was sold to a group that included L. Perry, but in 1975, the license was transferred to Howard Paish. On November 27, 1975, the Spatsizi Wilderness Provincial Park was established by Order-in-Council No. 3756/75 with the express purpose of the reserve is to protect wildlife habitat and preserve the alpine landscape. What was unique about the creation of this park at the time is the lack of mention of harvesting or exploiting in its policy statement. The park sits at a combined size of 6,783 km^{2} including the Gladys Lake Ecological Reserve, but a later revision of the area is estimated to be 698,659 hectares (excluding the reserve), making it the second largest provincial park in British Columbia. In 2001, the provincial park added more parkland following the Cassiar Iskut Stikine Land and Resource Management Plan (CIS LRMP), altering the Gladys Lake Ecological Reserve Boundary.

== Ecology ==
The Spatsizi Plateau Wilderness Provincial Park is under the Stikine Country Protected Area. The protected area is composed of different provincial parks like Mount Edziza Provincial Park, Stikine River Provincial Park, Gladys Lake Ecological Reserve, Pitman River Protected Area, Chukachida Protected Area, and Tatlatui Provincial Park.

The Stikine Country Protected Area System is composed of two major ecosections: the Southern Boreal Plateau and Stikine Plateau. Other ecosections include the Cassiar Ranges, Tahltan Highlands, Northern Skeena Mountains, and Eastern Skeena Mountains, but these areas have minor influence so they are underrepresented.

Other notable regions include the Spatsizi River stream, located an estimated 300 km north of Terrace. The sub-region features a high elevation range of up to 2800m to extreme lows of less than 750m. The river flows downstream from the south of and into Spatsizi Headwaters Provincial Park.

Biogeoclimatic zones and subzones of the protected area include five different types and they include: Alpine Tundra (AT), Spruce-Willow-Birch (SWB), Boreal White and Black Spruce (BWBSdk1), Engelmann Spruce-Subalpine Fir (ESSFwv), and Sub-Boreal Spruce (SBS). For Spatsizi Plateau Wilderness Park, it falls within the alpine zone and upper limit ranges of the subalpine zone from 1500 to 1700 metres.

Weather is commonly cloudy, with low temperatures and high humidity despite low precipitation. Temperatures generally remain freezing between October and April followed by cool summers. Recorded temperatures at the center of the park hold a mean maximum of 16.4C and a mean minimum of -24.7C.

=== Conservation ===
The Stikine Country Protected Area has an important conservation role in maintaining two natural ecosystem functions: the environment's absoprtive capacity to natural disturbances and predator-prey systems. In the protected area, there are many large mammal predatory-prey relations that include wildlife such as grizzly/black bears (Ursus arctos & Ursus americanus), caribou (Rangifer tarandus caribou), moose (Alces alces), wolves (Canis lupus), mountain goats (Oreamnos americanus), and Stone's sheep (Ovis dallis stonei).

Moreover, the Stikine Country Protected Area is also primarily protecting the biodiversity that it contains by preserving 27 plant species, 11 plant communities, and 15 animals species that are at risk. Animal species include caribou, grizzly bear, bull trout (Salvalinus confluentus), wolverine (Gulo gulo), and 11 bird species. Spatsizi Plateau is home to approximately 2000-2500 woodland caribou. Caribou in the area tend to winter along the Stikine River, and in general were found in higher concentrations in the northern portion of the park all year.

=== Gladys Lake Ecological Reserve ===
Gladys Lake Ecological Reserve, a 40,541 hectare area within Spatsizi Plateau Wilderness Provincial Park, contains twenty known subalpine ecological communities and thirteen known alpine ecological communities. White spruce (Picea glauca), subalpine fir (Abies lasiocarpa), and the American dwarf shrub (Betula glandulosa) are the primary woody vegetation found in lower subalpine areas. Many of the alpine areas in the Gladys Lake Ecological Reserve are Tundra.

Gladys Lake Ecological Reserve was created simultaneously and lies within the park, with the express purpose of studying Stone sheep and mountain goats, though in the modern day the scope of research in the area has expanded, most notably to include caribou and moose.

== First Nations cultural heritage ==
The Stikine Country Protected Area contains four cultural heritage roles for Mount Edziza Provincial Park, Spatsizi Plateau Wilderness Provincial Park, Stikine River Provincial Park, and Tatlatui Provincial Park. The cultural heritage role is to protect sites and key Aboriginal landmarks like Cold Fish Lake, obsidian quarry sites, and parts of the Dominion Telegraph Trail and Tahltan Eagle.

For the Spatsizi Plateau Wilderness Provincial Park, the cultural heritage role assigned to the area has protected village sites of the Caribou Hide and Metsantan First Nations. Also, historical and traditional trails, and various legend, archaeological, non-Aboriginal fur trade sites have been conserved.

In Spatsizi Plateau Wilderness Provincial Park, the Tahltan First Nation has used the area in the past for many generations, holding cultural significance to them as the land contains a rich history because of how the traditional ceremonies and practices conducted are essential for identity. The Tahltan First Nation has extensively used the land, emphasizing inter-community trade with nearby Indigenous communities like the Tlingit, Kaska, and Sekani people and Aboriginal subsistence through hunting and fishing. Hunting has been conducted in groups, where a wide range of wildlife such as rodents (squirrels, marmots, and beavers), to larger game like mountain goats/sheep, caribou, moose, and bears are hunted during the summer and continuing all the way through winter.

== Recreation ==
Recreation in the Spatsizi Plateau is a topic of significance in the remote wilderness of northern British Columbia, Canada. The Spatsizi Plateau, encompassing a vast expanse of pristine wilderness, is renowned for its outstanding recreational opportunities and natural beauty.

The Spatsizi Plateau in northern British Columbia offers recreational opportunities within its remote wilderness. Visitors take part in hiking, wildlife viewing, canoeing, fishing, camping, photography, stargazing, and guided nature interpretation. The park's environment and landscapes provide outdoor experiences, and responsible tourism practices are encouraged to protect its natural beauty.

== See also ==
- Spatsizi Headwaters Provincial Park
