= Babine River Corridor Provincial Park =

Provincial park in British Columbia

- IUCN category II (national park)
- Location within British Columbia
- Interactive map of Babine River Corridor Provincial Park
- Location: Cassiar Land District, British Columbia, Canada
- Nearest city: Hazelton, BC
- Coordinates: 55°36′59″N 127°06′44″W
- Area: 15,339 ha (37,900 acres)
- Established: June 28, 1999
- Governing body: BC Parks

Babine River Corridor Provincial Park is a provincial park in British Columbia, Canada, located to the north of Hazelton. The park was established by Order-in-Council in 1999 and is approximately 15,339 hectares in area.
