= Spatsizi River =

River in British Columbia, Canada

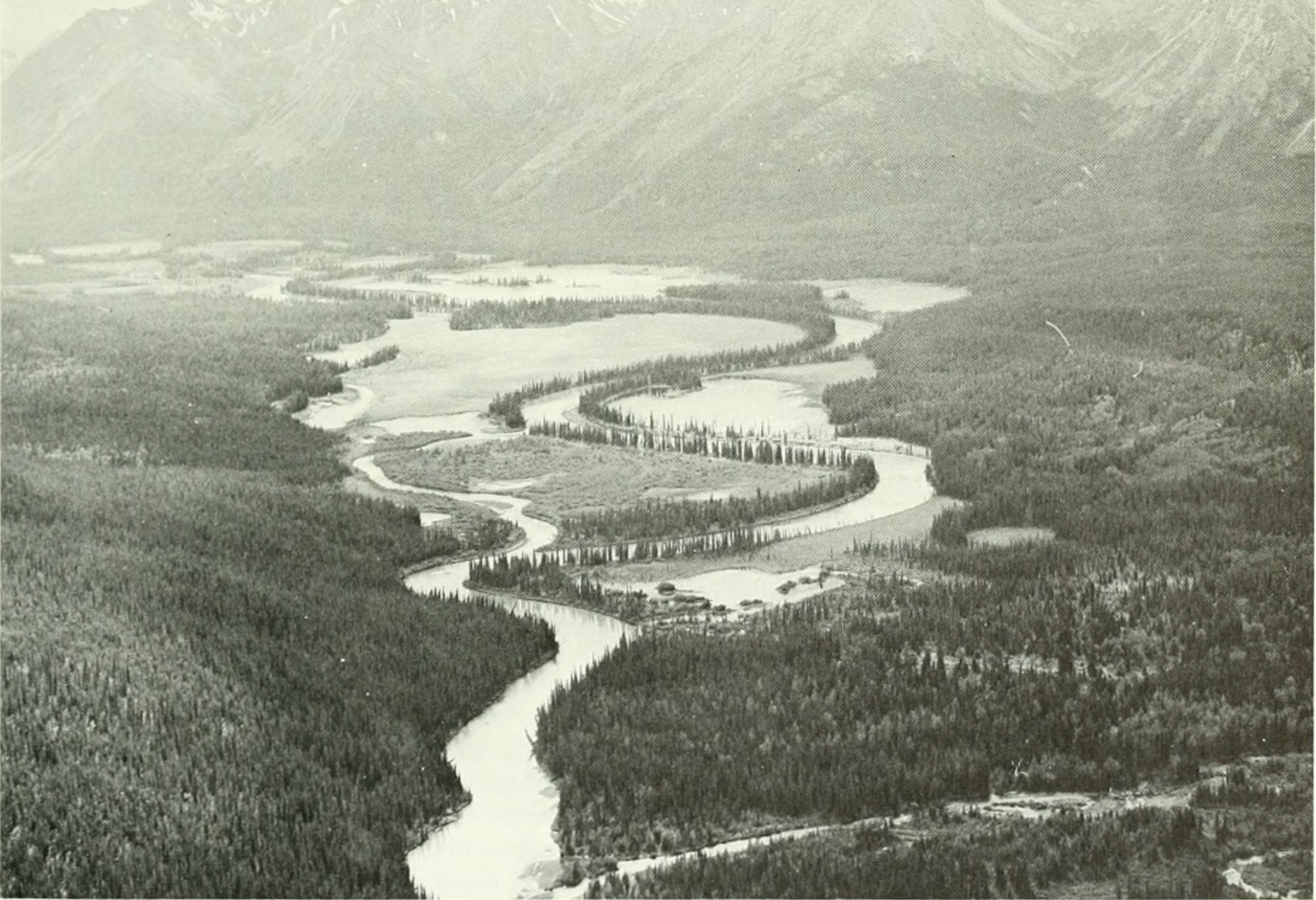

- Location of the mouth of the Spatsizi River in BC

Physical characteristics
- Source: Mount Gunanoot
  - location: Near Spatsizi Headwaters Provincial Park
  - elevation: 1,900 m (6,200 ft)
- Mouth: Stikine River
  - location: Hyland Post
  - coordinates: 57°42′27″N 128°06′11″W
- Length: 132 km (82 mi)
- Basin size: 3,516 km^{2} (1,358 mi^{2})
- Discharge
  - average: 60.8 m^{3}/s (2,150 cu ft/s)

The Spatsizi River is a tributary of the Stikine River, rising near Mount Gunanoot in the southeastern Spatsizi Plateau, British Columbia.

== Etymology ==
"Spatsizi" is a phrase from the Sekani language meaning "red goat", a reference to the habit of mountain goats in the region of rolling in the red dust of a particular mountain, making their coat-hair red.

== Geography ==
The Spatsizi River emerges near the foot of Mount Gunanoot in the Skeena Mountains of north-central British Columbia. It then flows downslope and enters Spatsizi Headwaters Provincial Park from the south. The river continues north, leaving the park to enter a broad valley in the heart of the Spatsizi Plateau. The flat-bottomed topography of the valley allows the river to meander considerably along much of its northwestward flow until it reaches the Stikine River in Stikine River Provincial Park.

== See also ==
- List of rivers of British Columbia
- Spatsizi Mountain
