= Sicintine Range =

Mountain range in British Columbia, Canada

- Location within British Columbia

Geography
- Country: Canada
- Province: British Columbia
- Range coordinates: 56°07′30″N 127°20′0″W
- Parent range: Skeena Mountains

The Sicintine Range is a small subrange of the Skeena Mountains of the Interior Mountains, located south of the Skeena River and between the Sicintine River and Squingula River in northern British Columbia, Canada.
