= Liard Plain =

Geographic region in British Columbia, Canada

Coordinates: 59°45′00″N 127°50′00″W

The Liard Plain is a landform in far northern British Columbia, Canada. It is located between the Smith River and the Dease Plateau.

== See also ==
- Geography of British Columbia
- List of physiogeographic regions of British Columbia
