= Klappan River =

Coordinates: 57°57′00″N 129°40′00″W

The Klappan River is a major tributary of the Stikine River in northwestern British Columbia, Canada. It flows north from an area known as the Sacred Headwaters, which is the source not only of this river but also of the Nass, Skeena, Spatsizi and Stikine Rivers. The headwaters region is the site of a controversial coal-bed methane project.

== See also ==
- List of rivers of British Columbia
- Klappan Range
- Klappan Mountain
