= Metsantan Pass =

Mountain pass in British Columbia, Canada

- Location within British Columbia
- Elevation: 1,270 m (4,170 ft)

Third Approach
- Location: British Columbia, Canada
- Range: Metsantan Range
- Coordinates: 57°25′00″N 127°23′00″W
- Topo map: NTS 94E6 Moosehorn Creek

Metsantan Pass, 1,270 metres (4,167 ft), is a mountain pass in the Metsantan Range of the Omineca Mountains in the Northern Interior of British Columbia, Canada. It is located between Metsantan Lake, in the drainage basin of the Stikine River (NW) and the headwaters of the Toodoggone River (SE), a tributary of the Finlay River which is part of the Peace-Mackenzie River drainage area, and therefore is located along the Continental Divide.

== See also ==
- Metsantan Peak
