= Kispiox River =

River in British Columbia, Canada

Coordinates: 55°20′33″N 127°41′36″W

The Kispiox River is a river in the Skeena Country of British Columbia, Canada. It is a tributary of the Skeena River, flowing southeast to meet that river above its confluence with the Bulkley near Hazelton. It forms the eastern boundary of the Kispiox Range subdivision of the Hazelton Mountains.

== See also ==
- List of rivers of British Columbia
- Kispiox
