= Tsay Keh Dene First Nation =

One of the Sekani bands of the Northern Interior of British Columbia, Canada

Tsay Keh Dene
- Band No. 609
- People: Sekani
- Headquarters: Prince George
- Province: British Columbia

Land
- Other reserves: Police Meadow 2; Tutu Creek 4; Parsnip 5; Finlay River 6; Mesilinka 7; Ingenika 8
- Land area: 14.42 km^{2} (5.57 sq mi)

Population (2025)
- On reserve: 15
- On other land: 221
- Off reserve: 287
- Total population: 5

Government
- Chief: Johnny Pierre
- Council: Sabrina Dulude; Rowena Izony; Brigam Miller; Daniel Pierre

Website
- tsaykeh.com

Tsay Keh Dene First Nation is one of the Sekani bands of the Northern Interior of British Columbia. The territories, settlements, and reserves surround Williston Lake in the Omineca region of central British Columbia. The locations range from about 155 kilometres (96 mi) north of Prince George to 495 kilometres (308 mi) northwest of the city.

== Identity ==
Tsay Keh Nay (Tsek'ehne) means "People of the Mountain".

While navigating the Parsnip River in 1793, Alexander MacKenzie of the North West Company (NWC) made the first European contact with the Tsek'ehne. In 1824, Samuel Black of the Hudson's Bay Company (HBC), who made the first European exploration of the Finlay River headwaters, encountered three Tse Keh Nay groups.

During the early fur trade, the Tse Keh Nay went from being the unnamed Indians of MacKenzie's journal to the Sicannies and Thecannies of Harmon's, Black's and Stuart's journals.

Now known as the Sekani, the Tse Keh Nay are currently subdivided into the four First Nations and corresponding communities of Kwadacha/Fort Ware, McLeod Lake, Takla Lake and Tsay Keh Dene. The respective traditional territories overlap.

Tsay Keh Dene have chosen to pursue the treaty process independent of the others. However, while seeking to save the Amazay Lake from Northgate Minerals, the three northern communities (Kwadacha, Tsay Keh Dene, and Takla Lake) presented themselves as a single Tse Keh Nay First Nation.

== Earlier presence ==
Inhabiting the Rocky Mountain Trench, the Tse Keh Nay faced periodic attacks from the east by the Dane-zaa and Rocky Mountain Indians.

In 1870, the HBC established the Fort Grahame fur trading post on the east bank 105 kilometres (65 mi) north of Finlay Forks. The nearby Tsek'ehne community may have predated the fort. In 1915, three houses existed, which were only occupied when residents were not out on the land. Factor Ross, on the west bank opposite, was the more important settlement site, but the Fort Grahame area name often applied to both sides of the river. The First Nations became known by this name.

The 68-hectare (168-acre) Fort Grahame reserve (called Finlay Forks 1) was allotted in 1916, surveyed in 1926, and transferred to the federal government in 1938.

In 1949, the HBC closed the trading post.

By the early 1960s, few people lived on the reserve. The reservoir, which began filling in 1968, reached optimum level in 1973. Seymour Isaac was elected band chief in 1971.

Williston Lake, created as part of the W. A. C. Bennett Dam project, flooded a large part of the band territory with devastating effects on the people and their way of life.

The ultimate destination of all the remains in the three flooded Fort Grahame cemeteries is unclear. Those in the Factor Ross cemetery across the river sloughed into the reservoir in 1983.

Census population: Tsay Keh Dene (Finlay River 6)
Year	Pop.	±%
2016	230	—
2021	228	−0.9%

== Later reserves and settlements ==
The people became known as the Ingenika Band, which was renamed the Tsay Keh Dene Band around 1993.

By 1978, Ingenika Point, Ingenika Mine/Grassy Bluff, and Tucha Lake were the three main off-reserve communities. However, individuals were also living at 8 Mile Creek, Davis Creek, Eagle Rock, Horn Creek, Mesilinka, and Tobin Lake. Ingenika Mine/Grassy Bluff, which was inhabited prior to the reservoir, had about 50 residents by 1980.

In 1989, the band reached an agreement with the provincial and federal governments to create the 810-hectare (2,000-acre) Tsay Keh Dene reserve at the northern tip of the lake, the 400-hectare (1,000-acre) Mesilinka reserve on the Mesilinka River near Blackpine Lake, and a non-residential plot at Ingenika Point. In exchange, the band would surrender Tutu Creek 4 and Parsnip 5. Subsequent amendments resulted in the present configuration.

Tsay Keh Dene village

Served by a central office in Prince George, the present reserves and settlements under the jurisdiction of the Tsay Keh Dene First Nation are as follows:

- Tsay Keh Dene (Finlay River 6) of 852.8 hectares (2,107 acres)
- Ingenika Point (Ingenika 8?) of 2 hectares (5 acres)
- Mesilinka 7 (Mesilinka River north of Blackpine Lake) of 387 hectares (956 acres)
- Parsnip 5 of 34.2 hectares (85 acres)
- Police Meadow 2 of 129.5 hectares (320 acres)
- TuTu Creek 4 of 37.3 hectares (92 acres)

=== Tsay Keh Dene ===
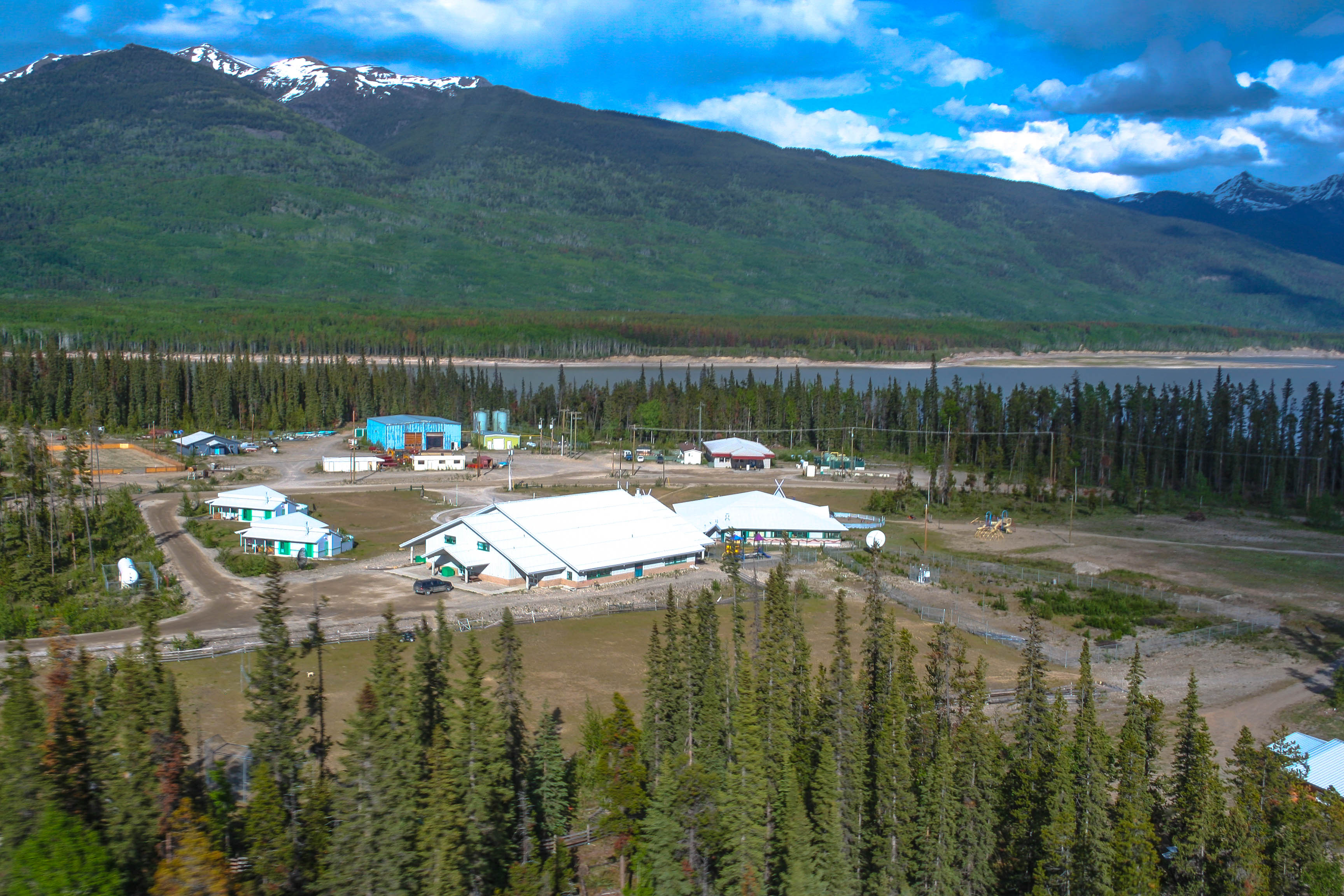
Village of Tsay Keh Dene, 2008.

In April 1990, construction began on the new community, reducing the band unemployment rate. That winter, the Ingenika Point residents began relocating to the partially completed village. The climate created by the reservoir was the main reason for the move. Strong winds and sandstorms occur at Ingenika. The calmest areas of the lake are at the ends of Parsnip and Finlay reaches, whereas in the deeper parts, waves can reach 12 metres (40 ft). Partially and completely submerged logs are hazardous even in good weather.

Over the following years, the population gradually moved from Ingenika Point, which would have involved the relocation of the school. In 1995, a satellite RCMP station opened.

The Band operated school (K–12), with about 60 students, and RCMP post, operate currently.

=== Ingenika Point/Old Ingenika ===
When the HBC closed Fort Grahame in 1949, Frank (Shorty) Webber already ran a trading post at Old Ingenika. On Webber's death in 1952, Ben Corke took over, operating the store on regular visits. River freighters Art and Jim Van Somer replaced him in 1963. A Roman Catholic church was built in 1959. The population was about 25 in 1961. The store closed in 1968.

After the dam reservoir had consumed the Old Ingenika settlement, all that remained was a BC Forest Service runway on the bluff above. The location was preferred to the new reserves, because the hunting was better, their ancestors were buried there, and child protective services were less likely to visit.

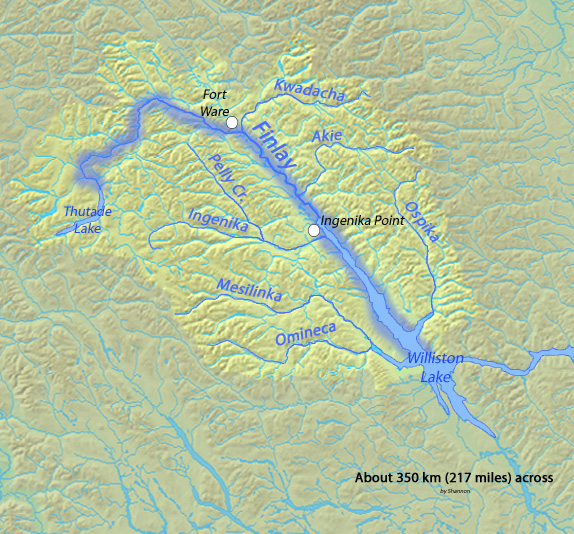
Map of the Finlay River.

In 1971, band members began returning from the forestry camps to the locality to pursue a traditional lifestyle by squatting on Crown land. By September, 52 people had arrived. By December, Indian Affairs had erected 11 cabins, despite the non-reserve status. Trapper and guide Harvey Sims, who stayed at the Point as the water rose, opened a store and also hired local Tsek'ehne to work for his guiding outfit.

By mid-1973, the population was 56. That year, the band built a school, which opened in October. In 1975, a new band office was built, and the band rejected the offer of a 200-hectare (500-acre) onsite reserve as inadequate. When all the school teachers resigned in fall 1978, owing to safety concerns, Indian Affairs, which had previously provided limited funding to the school, resolved the matter.

In 1980, the school transitioned to the Accelerated Christian Education curriculum. When Harvey Sims planned to leave the community, he sold his supplies at cost to the band, which took over the store in mid-1984. The store soon experienced operational difficulties. In 1987, despite the squatter community status, the provincial and federal governments took steps to resolve housing, water, sewage, supply, education, and employment issues in the village.

Until 1988 there was no road northward to Ingenika and the only way to easily enter into the area was by air or barge during the summer.

The cemetery at the Point remains in use.

=== Mesilinka 7 ===
Ray Izony, who became band chief in 1975, lived at Grassy Bluff by 1977. When Gordon Pierre was elected chief in 1986, Ray Izony and about 40 band members relocated to Blackpine Lake. This group eventually formed into a de facto band known as the Mesilinka Band led by Ray, which existed until the early 1990s. In 1989, agreement was reached to create a new reserve in the vicinity.

=== Parnsip 5 ===
During the early 1910s, Indian Agent William McAllan recommended the creation of reserves within 10 kilometres (6 mi) of this location but was overruled by the McKenna–McBride Commission.

The reserve announced in 1966 was projected to cover 35.6 hectares (88 acres). In March 1967, BC Hydro informed Indian Affairs that the reserve overlapped with provincial reserves for town site purposes, but the province lifted those encumbrances in May. The province transferred ownership of the land to the federal government in June 1969, which created the new reserves in October.

Indian Affairs assumed the new reserves would provide the best of both worlds, allowing residents to remain isolated from wider Euro-Canadian society but have access to the waterways for transportation, while benefitting from social services and job opportunities. However, band members were concerned the new reserves were outside their traditional territory. On surveying, the size changed to 34.1 hectares (84.3 acres).

During summer and fall 1971, five prefabricated houses were erected. However, the series of delays in relocating the first five families from the forestry camps to the Parsnip River reserve, which did not occur until that October, dissuaded others. The benefits of access to clean water, the electrical grid, the Hart Highway, and services, were only partially available. The houses lacked proper insulation and venting and running water was not installed until 1973. When the Finlay Forks school closed in December 1971, education became another issue.

In 1972, Chief Isaac relocated to Parsnip 5. By mid-1973, the population was 48. In 1974, only two families remained, who also left the next year. The reserve was too small, had poor soil and was too close to Mackenzie. Since then, Parsnip 5 has become a ghost town, which comprises a cemetery, building foundations, and a dump for domestic waste.

=== Police Meadow 2 ===
Around 1905, a NWMP presence resulted in the naming of a meadow north of Fort Grahame as Police Meadows.

The 130-hectare (320-acre) Police Meadows 2 reserve was allotted in 1916, surveyed in 1926, and transferred to the federal government in 1938.

The lowering of the dam height from an earlier proposal meant the reservoir did not submerge the reserve, which was uninhabited and purely a meadow in a mountain valley.

During the 1970s, no interest emerged to populate this reserve, beyond a recommendation by Chief Isaac. In 1974, the band resolved that Police Meadows should remain for agriculture.

Currently the community uses the reserve as a farm and they have even reintroduced bison into their traditional territory.

=== TuTu Creek 4 ===
The reserve is about 15 kilometres (9 mi) north of Mackenzie. Announced in 1966, the projected footprint was 32.4 hectares (80 acres). On surveying, the size increased to 37.4 hectares (92.3 acres).

Most of the shortcomings of Parson 5 equally applied to TuTu Creek 4, such as the multiple delays in availability. In fact, the latter was even less popular than the former. In 1970, only two families expressed any interest in relocating to the reserve, whereas Indian Affairs claimed families wanted to move there.

The reserve infringed upon another band's traditional territory, namely the McLeod Lake Tsek'ehne and was the location of a McLeod Lake camp.

No candidates appear to have ever moved to the reserve. Over the passage of time, Tutu Creek 4 became overgrown and bears no evidence of its former existence.

== Film media ==
The Scattering of Man (Dəne Yi'Injetl), a 2021 documentary film by Luke Gleeson, profiled the effects on the community of the dam construction.
