= Metsantan Range =

Mountain range in British Columbia, Canada

- Location within British Columbia

Geography
- Country: Canada
- Region: British Columbia
- Range coordinates: 57°33′N 127°16′W
- Parent range: Omineca Mountains

The Metsantan Range are a mountain range between the upper Stikine and the Finlay River drainages in northern British Columbia, Canada. It has an area of 1116 km^{2} and is a subrange of the Omineca Mountains which in turn form part of the Interior Mountains.

== See also ==
- Metsantan Pass
- Metsantan Peak
- Metsantan Lake
- Toodoggone River
