= Sekani =

First Nations people of British Columbia, Canada

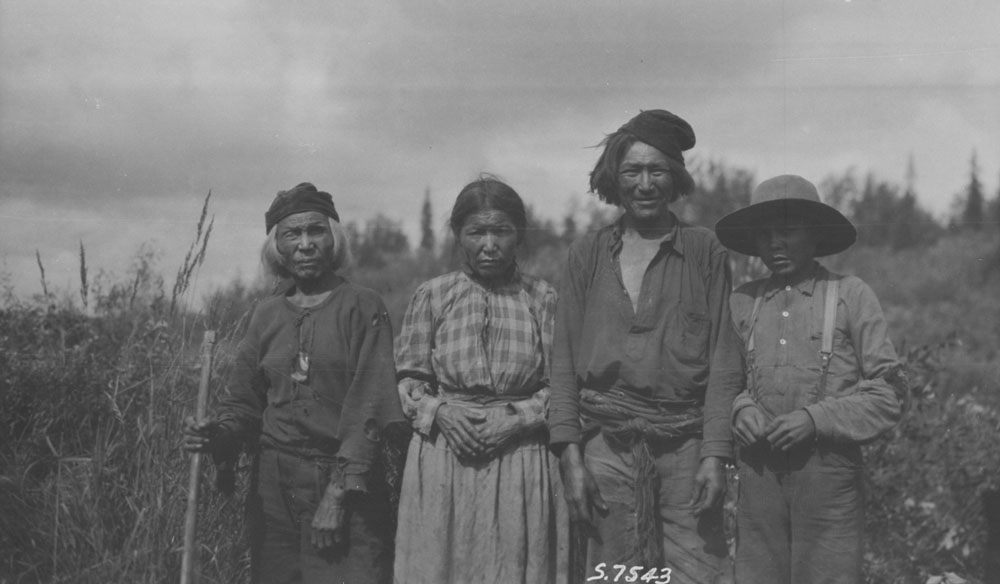
- Group of Sekani people at Fort Nelson, British Columbia

Regions with significant populations
- Canada (British Columbia)

Languages
- English, Sekani

Religion
- Christianity; animism

Related ethnic groups
- Tagish; Tahltan; Kaska; Carrier; Beaver

Sekani or Tseʼkhene are a First Nations people of the Athabaskan-speaking ethnolinguistic group in the northern interior of British Columbia. Their territory includes the Finlay and Parsnip River drainages of the Rocky Mountain Trench. The neighbours of the Sekani are the Babine to the west, Dakelh to the south, Dunneza (Beaver) to the east, and Kaska and Tahltan to the north—all Athabaskan peoples. In addition, due to the westward spread of the Plains Cree in recent centuries, their neighbours to the east now include Cree communities.

Sekani people call their language [tsekʼene] or [tθekʼene], depending on dialect, which, appended with Dene (meaning people), means "people on the rocks"; Sekani is an anglicization of this term. Other forms occasionally found, especially in older sources, are Secunnie, Siccanie, Sikani, and the French Sékanais.

== History ==
The Sekani and Dunneza historically shared a very similar culture and probably diverged by the 18th century. Around the late 18th century, the Sekani were forced to move westward due to encroachments from the Plains Cree. Contact with Whites began around the 1820s and North West Company trading posts were built soon after though the Sekani maintained trading contacts with neighboring tribes to obtain European goods.

A gold rush during the 1870's led to an influx of White settlers establishing themselves in the region. This caused not only social disruption of the Sekani's way of life but also introduced diseases that reduced the population. The total population of the Sekani was estimated at nearly 700 in the late 1980s.

== Culture ==
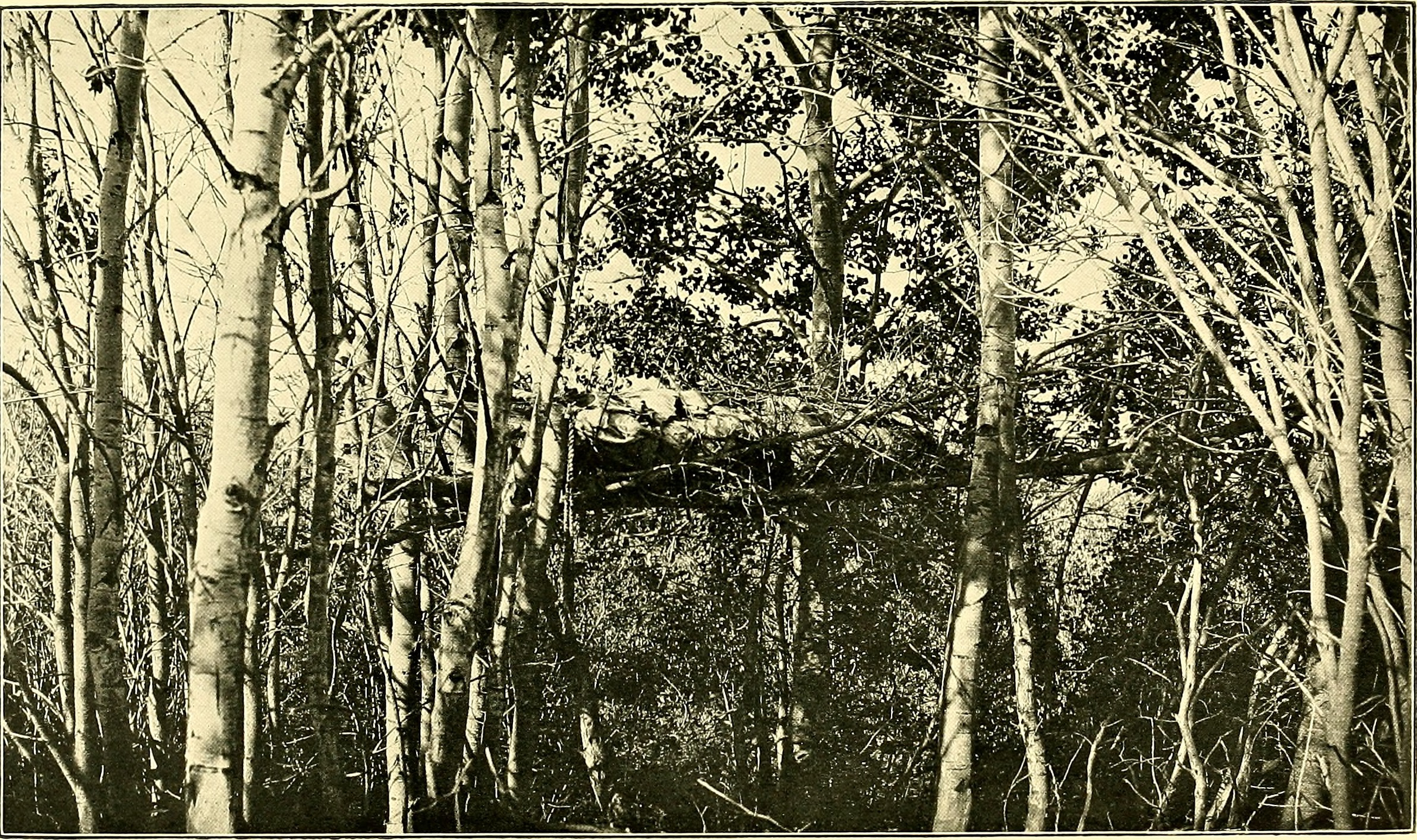
Sekani tree burial

The traditional Sekani way of life was based on hunting and gathering. Although fish formed part of the diet, the Sekani relied more heavily on game, in contrast to their Carrier and Babine neighbors. Plant food consisted largely of berries, especially of blueberries.

The Sekani traditionally cremated their deceased. After cremation was discontinued, the Sekani revived an old custom, probably never entirely abandoned, of covering the dead man with the brush hut that had sheltered him during his last days and then deserting the locality for a period. Persons of influence were buried in coffins raised on platforms or trees.

They were said to have practiced polyandry before large scale conversion to Catholicism.

== Today's Sekani First Nations ==
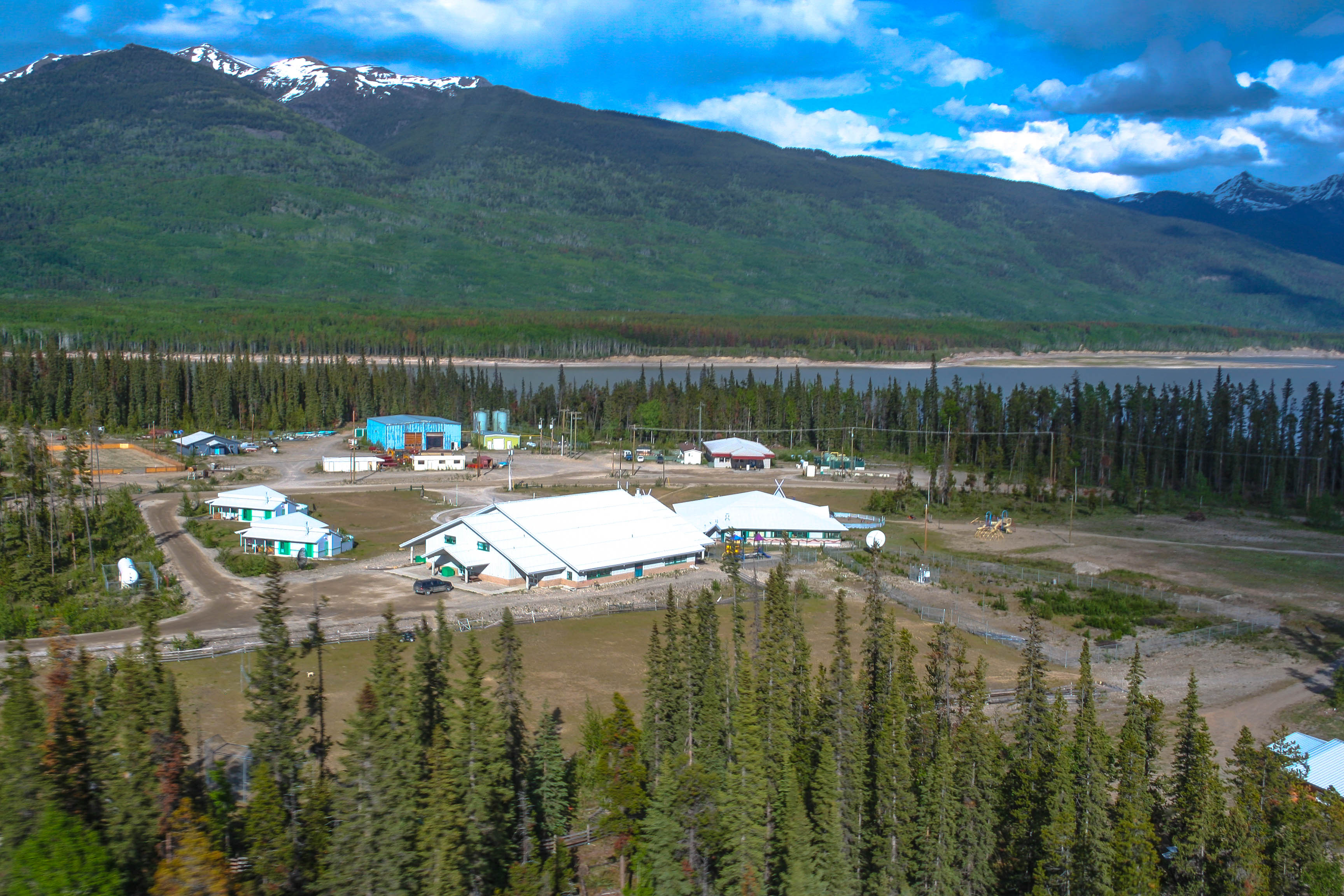
Tsay Keh Dene

Three bands identify as Sekani: Kwadacha, McLeod Lake, and Tsay-Keh Dene. In addition, the Takla Lake First Nation, which identifies as Carrier, includes many people of Sekani descent and until recently many of its members spoke the Sekani language.

- Kwadacha First Nation (formerly called ‘Fort Ware Indian Band’, the First Nation are Sekani and Kaska Dena. The main community is located at Fort Ware (now called Kwadacha), approximately 570 km north of Prince George in British Columbia, at the confluence of the Fox, the Kwadacha, and Finley rivers in the Rocky Mountain Trench, Reserves: Fort Ware #1, Sucker Lake #2, Weissener Lake #3, ca. 4 km^{2}, Population: 425)
- McLeod Lake Indian Band (also known as ‘McLeod Lake Tse'Khene First Nation’, the main community is McLeod Lake on the most populous IR McLeod Lake #1, on the north end of McLeod Lake, ca. 150 km north of Prince George, Reserves: Arctic Lake #10, Blue Lake #24, Bear Lake #32, Carp Lake #3, Davie Lake #28, Finlay Bay #21, Hominka #11, Kerry Lake East #9, Kerry Lake West #8, Mackenzie #19, McIntyre Lake #23, McLeod Lake #1, McLeod Lake #5, Pack River #2, Quaw Island #25, Sas Mighe Indian #32, Tacheeda Lake #14, Tom Cook #26, War Lake #4, Weedon Carp #6, Weedon Lake #27, Weston Bay #20, ca. 160 km^{2}, Population: 618)
- Tsay Keh Dene First Nation (also known as ‘Tsay Keh Dene Band’, formerly known as ‘Ingenika Indian Band’, Tsay Keh's traditional territory spans north to Mt. Trace, west to South Pass Peak, south to the Nation River, and east to Mount Laurier, while their offices are located in the City of Prince George, their territories, settlements, and Indian Reserves are all to the north, in the area of Lake Williston, Reserves: Ingenika Settlement, Mesilinka, Parsnip #5 (on the left bank of the Parsnip River at Fort Grahame), Police Meadow #2 (6,5 east of the Finlay River, 24 km northwest of Fort Grahame), Tutu Creek #4 (on left bank of the Parsnip River at Fort Grahame), ca. 2 km^{2}, Population: 431)
- Takla Lake First Nation (the Takla Lake Nation is an amalgamation of the North Takla Band and the Fort Connelly Band in 1959, the main community is at Takla Landing lies within IR #7 and #7A, which lies 320 km north of Prince George, B.C, situated on the eastern shore of Tatl'ah Bun (Takla Lake), The Takla Lake people currently speak predominantly Canadian English and the Babine dialect of Babine-Witsuwit'en, until recently, many people also spoke Sekani, and some spoke Gitxsan, some people also speak the Stuart Lake dialect of Carrier, the overall identification of the community is as Carrier, Reserves: Driftwood River #1, Bear Lake (Upper Driftwood River) #1A, Bear Lake (Tsaytut Bay) #1B, Bear Lake (Tsaytut Island) #1C, Bear Lake (Kotsine) #2, Bear Lake (Sustut River) #3, Bear River (Fort Connelly) #4, Tsupmeet (Patcha Creek) #5, Klewaduska (Cataract) #6, North Takla Lake #7, North Takla Lake #7A, North Takla Lake (West Landing) #8, Takla Lake (Ferry Landing) #9, North Takla Lake (Bates Creek) #10, Cheztainya Lake #11, North Takla Lake #11A, North Takla Lake #12, Population: 703)

== See also ==
- Caribou Hide, British Columbia

== Bibliography ==
- Lanoue, Guy (1992). Brothers: the politics of violence among the Sekani of northern British Columbia. Explorations in anthropology. New York: Berg. ISBN 978-0-85496-746-9.
