= Atna Range =

Mountain range in British Columbia, Canada

- Location within British Columbia

Highest point
- Peak: Shedin Peak
- Elevation: 2,588 m (8,491 ft)
- Coordinates: 55°56′21.1″N 127°28′48.0″W

Dimensions
- Area: 1,418 km^{2} (547 mi^{2})

Geography
- Country: Canada
- Province: British Columbia
- Parent range: Skeena Mountains

The Atna Range is a small subrange of the Skeena Mountains of the Interior Mountains, located in northern British Columbia, Canada. The range's elevation is between 371 and 2466 meters, and it is bound by both Shedin and Shelagyote Creeks. Atna Range can also be referred to as the Atna Mountains.
