= Kispiox Range =

Mountain range in British Columbia, Canada

- Location within British Columbia

Highest point
- Peak: Kispiox Mountain
- Elevation: 2,096 m (6,877 ft)
- Coordinates: 55°23′54.7″N 127°56′36.4″W

Geography
- Country: Canada
- Province: British Columbia
- Parent range: Hazelton Mountains

The Kispiox Range is a subrange of the Hazelton Mountains, located between the Kispiox and Kitwanga Rivers in northern British Columbia, Canada. The range is about 18 miles (29 km) long by 8 miles (13 km) wide.
