= Todagin South Slope Provincial Park =

Provincial park in British Columbia, Canada

- IUCN category II (national park)
- Location within British Columbia
- Interactive map of Todagin South Slope Provincial Park
- Location: British Columbia, Canada
- Nearest city: Prince Rupert
- Coordinates: 57°36′59″N 129°54′55″W
- Area: 35.57 km^{2} (13.73 sq mi)
- Established: April 11, 2001
- Governing body: BC Parks

Todagin South Slope Provincial Park is a provincial park in British Columbia, Canada, located on the west side of Todagin Creek to the east of Kinaskan Lake in the Stikine Country, to the south of the community of Dease Lake. Created in 2001, it contains c. 3557 ha.
