= Taylor River (British Columbia) =

Coordinates: 49°17′10″N 125°12′36″W

Taylor River is located on Vancouver Island in the province of British Columbia, Canada. It has an elevation of 53 metres.

The river is the main tributary of Sproat Lake, which is linked to the Alberni Inlet – one of British Columbia’s most famous historic salmon runs. It is 29 kilometres (18 mi) in length, drains an area of 65 square kilometres (25 sq mi), and supports critical spawning channels for cutthroat and steelhead trout, plus coho and sockeye salmon. The river is flanked by Highway 4, a major highway, on one side, and a logging road on the other.

The area around the Taylor River is very sparsely populated, and consists mainly of coniferous forest. Oceanic climate prevails in the area.

== See also ==
- List of rivers of British Columbia
