= Spatsizi Plateau =

Plateau in British Columbia, Canada

- Plateau
- Location within British Columbia
- Coordinates: 57°50′00″N 128°29′00″W
- Location: British Columbia, Canada
- Part of: Stikine Plateau
- Geology: Flood basalt

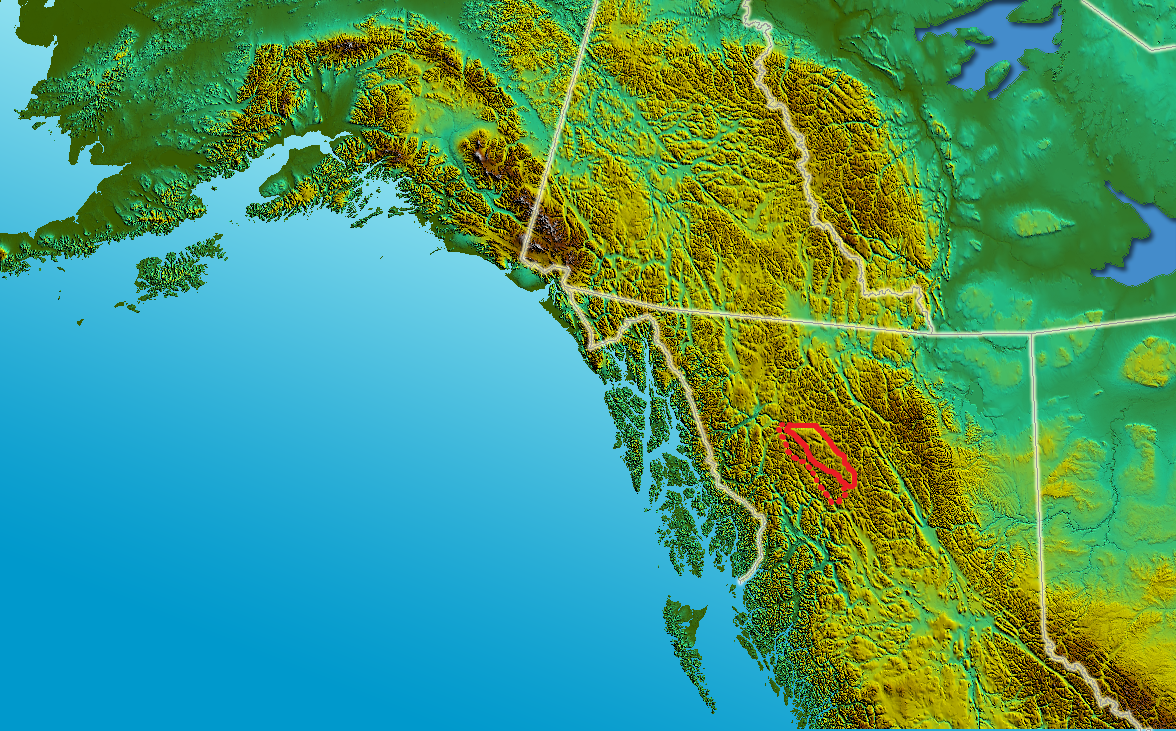

The Spatsizi Plateau is a plateau in the upper basin of the Stikine River in north-central British Columbia, Canada. Most of the plateau, which is a sub-plateau of the Stikine Plateau, is enshrined in either Spatsizi Plateau Wilderness Provincial Park or Spatsizi Headwaters Provincial Park. It is flanked on the south and southwest by the Skeena Mountains, on the southeast by the Omineca Mountains, on the northeast by the Stikine Ranges of the Cassiar Mountains, and on the west by the Klastline Plateau (another subplateau of the Stikine Plateau).

== Name ==
The name is an adaptation of a phrase in the Sekani language meaning "red goat", a reference to the habit of mountain goats in the area rolling on a particular red-coloured mountain, turning their coats red (tspah=goat, tsije=red).

== Geology and terrain ==
The plateau is a large lava plateau, dissected by river valleys, and contains various small mountain ranges. Both the Stikine and Spatsizi Rivers have their sources in the plateau.

== Climate ==
The climate of the plateau, which is of high altitude, is sub-arctic in nature. Isolated from the moisture of the Pacific Ocean by successive walls of mountains and other plateaus, the Spatsizi is semi-arid in many areas.

== Fauna ==
The Spatsizi Plateau is the range of the largest remaining herd of woodland caribou in British Columbia. Other fauna in the area include mountain goats, moose, grizzlies and wolves.
