= Dease Plateau =

Sub-plateau in British Columbia, Canada

- Plateau
- Location within British Columbia
- Coordinates: 59°35′00″N 129°30′00″W
- Location: British Columbia and Yukon
- Part of: Yukon Plateau or Cassiar Mountains

The Dease Plateau is a sub-plateau of the larger Yukon Plateau, and is located in far northern British Columbia, Canada, northwest from the Deadwood River to and beyond the Yukon-British Columbia boundary. The plateau is named in association with Dease Lake and the Dease River. Very mountainous in some of its vast area, it is in some classification systems it is included as a subarea of the Cassiar Mountains.

== Subranges ==
- Horseranch Range
