= Babine River =

- Location of mouth

Location
- Country: Canada
- Province: British Columbia
- District: Cassiar Land District

Physical characteristics
- Mouth
  - coordinates: 55°40′59″N 127°42′0″W
- Length: about 97 km (60 mi)

Babine River is a river in central British Columbia, Canada. It drains Babine Lake and is a tributary of the Skeena River, and is about 97 kilometres (60 mi) long.

Babine River is considered one of the last unspoiled and pristine rivers in British Columbia. Through most of its course it is enclosed by the Babine River Corridor Provincial Park which abounds in black bears and grizzly bears. It is famous in fishing circles as the home of some of the largest rainbow trout and steelhead in the world. Babine River is a famous whitewater run for kayakers, canoeists and rafters.

== See also ==
- List of rivers of British Columbia
