= Sacred Headwaters =

Drainage basin and source of three rivers

Sacred Headwaters Klabona (Tahltan)
- Drainage basin
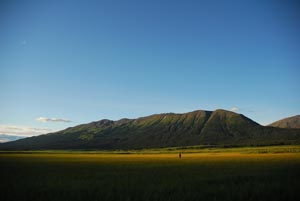
- Sacred Headwaters

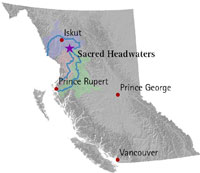
- Location in British Columbia
- Coordinates: 57°13′00″N 129°01′00″W
- Location: Kitimat-Stikine RD and Stikine Region, British Columbia

The Sacred Headwaters is a large subalpine drainage basin centred around Klappan Mountain of the Klappan Range in northern British Columbia. It is the source of three wild salmon rivers: the Skeena River, Nass River, and Stikine River. It is also referred to as the Klappan Valley, although the Klappan—a tributary of the Stikine River—is only one of the area's watersheds. Local Tahltan people call the area Klabona, which is loosely translated as "headwaters".

== Ecology ==
Contains eight different biogeoclimatic zones, ranging from near-desert to temperate and boreal forest ecosystems. The area has a significant population of grizzly bears, stone sheep, caribou, wolves, and mountain goats. Salmon swim over 400 kilometres from the Pacific Ocean to spawn in the upper reaches of the river.

== Cultural significance ==
Tahltan Nation has a culture that is intricately woven into all aspects of their language, art, governance, and everyday life. The Tahltan Nation is divided into two clans, Crow and Wolf; each clan is further divided into several smaller family groups. In 1910, they signed the Declaration of the Tàłtàn Tribe, stressing the cultural significance of preserving their heritage, language, and lands. The area is of significant cultural, traditional, spiritual and environmental value to the Tahltan Nation, using it as a ceremonial and cultural event grounds.

The Sacred Headwaters are located right in the middle of the Tahltan's territory. The Sacred Headwaters have been a part of the Tahltan Nation's territory for thousands of years, and they had been struggling for decades to have access to the waters and preserve the land for future generations. On 27 August 2019, the Tahltan Nation and the Government of British Columbia signed the Klappan Plan, an agreement intended to protect and manage the Sacred Headwaters.

== Industrial development ==
The Sacred Headwaters is rich in mineral and energy resources, particularly coal and coalbed methane. There are three major zones that are being heavily affected by major industrial activity: Zone A has been under major industrial activity for a minimum of 20 years; Zone B, an area with high concentration of Tahltan values, is under economic development; and Zone C is proposed for economic development that is environmentally and culturally responsible, and conforms to regulatory processes and agreements between the Tahltan Nation and the BC government.

Several industrial development projects were planned for the area, including Fortune Minerals' open-pit Klappan Coal Mine and Royal Dutch Shell's Klappan Coalbed Methane Project. Kathy Penney, Klappan Commercial Mgr, stated that in 2004 Shell Canada drilled three exploratory wells. The British Columbia Ministry of Energy, Mines and Petroleum Resources estimates the Klappan coal deposit could contain as much as 8.1 trillion cubic feet (230 km^{3}) of coalbed methane gas.

=== Klappan Coal Mine ===
Fortune Coal Limited (FCL) entered on 13 July 2011 into an unincorporated joint venture with Posco Canada (POSCAN). The venture, an 80–20 split, was based on mineral rights held by FCL and finances provided by POSCAN. FCL was 100% controlled by Fortune Minerals Limited, an Ontario-based company that traded on the TSX Venture Exchange. POSCAN, which contributed $30 million to the project, was a subsidiary of one of the world's largest steel producers, and had strong ties to the Government of South Korea. The financial resources of the FML were not sufficient to bring any of its properties into commercial production as of 2012. The Klappan project was estimated to need $789 million to begin production, and to generate substantially less than 1,000 jobs. FML called this the "Arctos Anthracite Project".

The government of British Columbia, in whose jurisdiction the mineral rights are held, planned on 20 September 2013 to dispatch a minister to deal with the First Nations' blockade of the project. Some First Nations groups committed to defending the Sacred Headwaters. "We dare Fortune to get us arrested," said group spokesperson Rhoda Quock. “We have cameras here. We will make sure the world knows what’s going on.” On 23 September Quock was interviewed on CBC's As It Happens, and asked Fortune to obtain an injunction. The CEO of FML said on 24 September that the company would not seek an injunction, and that they would let the BC government mediate a settlement instead.

=== Klappan Coalbed Methane Project ===
The Klappan Coalbed Methane Project was a proposal by Shell Canada to develop a coalbed methane project in the Sacred Headwaters. In 2004, the British Columbia government granted Royal Dutch Shell a 400,000-hectare (4,000 km^{2}) tenure for coalbed methane development. It was accessed by road via the abandoned BC Rail grade, which intersects British Columbia Highway 37 south of Iskut. As of summer 2008, Shell's project was in the exploration phase. Shell drilled three exploratory wells in 2004 and was preparing to drill 14 additional wells in 2008, 8 of which were proposed for the headwaters of the Skeena River. If developed, Shell's project would have entailed a network of gas wells connected by roads and pipelines, as well as a pipeline to deliver the gas to market. Shell disclosed neither how many wells would have been necessary to make the project economically viable nor route options for the delivery pipeline. The Klappan Coalbed Methane Project was opposed by both First Nations groups and non-governmental organizations. The Pembina Institute, an environmentalist think-tank, released a report on the potential impacts of the Klappan Coalbed Methane Project on wild salmon, calling it a "risky experiment" as commercial coalbed methane production had never been attempted in a salmon-bearing watershed. On December 18, 2012, the B.C. government announced that Shell Canada would relinquish its tenure on the land, and that oil and gas development would be banned in the Sacred Headwaters.

=== Developments since 2015 ===
In April 2015, the Government of British Columbia bought all coal licences in the area around Mount Klappan, halting development for the foreseeable future. At the same time, the Tahltan First Nation and provincial government began working on a long-term plan for the Sacred Headwaters.

The campaign to protect the Sacred Headwaters from industrial development is profiled in a 2022 documentary film, The Klabona Keepers.
