= Sekani language =

Indigenous language of British Columbia, Canada

Sekani
- Tse'khene
- Native to: Canada
- Region: British Columbia
- Ethnicity: 1,410 Sekani people (2014, FPCC)
- Native speakers: 65 (2021 census); 135 with knowledge (2021)
- Language family: Na-Dené: Athabaskan; Northern Athabaskan; Sekani
- Writing system: Latin script Canadian Aboriginal syllabics

Language codes
- ISO 639-3: sek
- Glottolog: seka1250
- ELP: Tse'khene (Sekani)
- Sekani is classified as Critically Endangered by the UNESCO Atlas of the World's Languages in Danger.

Sekani or Tse’khene is the indigenous language of the Sekani of the British Columbia Interior. It is spoken primarily in communities located along the upper Peace, Parsnip, and Finlay river systems, including areas around Kwadacha, Tsay Keh Dene First Nation, and McLeod Lake. The language historically reflects the people's mobility across a vast boreal and mountainous landscape, with different bands occupying distinct territories while maintaining close linguistic ties.

Most are only semispeakers, and the language is considered critically endangered. English predominates in education, government, wage labor, and interactions with outsiders, while Sekani is spoken more frequently by older generations and in family or ceremonial contexts. Many younger Sekani understand some of the language but have limited fluency, reflecting the effects of residential schools, language shift, and changing economic and social structure. As a result, English often serves economic functions, whereas Sekani remains closely associated with cultural knowledge and traditional ways of life.

== Phonology ==
=== Consonants ===
Sekani has 33 consonants:

		Bilabial	Alveolar			Post- Alveolar	Velar		Glottal
		Bilabial	plain	sibilant	lateral	Post- Alveolar	plain	labial	Glottal
Stop	voiceless	p	t	ts	tɬ	tʃ	k	kʷ	
Stop	aspirated	(pʰ)	tʰ	tsʰ	tɬʰ	tʃʰ	kʰ	kʷʰ	
Stop	ejective		tʼ	tsʼ	tɬʼ	tʃʼ	kʼ	kʼʷ	ʔ
Nasal		m	n						
Fricative- Approximant (Note: Sekani, like other Athabaskan languages, does not contrast fricatives with approximants.)	voiceless			s	ɬ	ç	x	xʷ	h
Fricative- Approximant	voiced			z	l	j	ɣ	w	

=== Vowels ===
	Front	Central	Back
High	i		u
Mid	e	ə	o
Low		a	

=== Tone ===
Sekani has two tones: low and high. High tone is the more common tone. Syllables phonologically marked for tone are low. For example, tsun means 'dirt', while tsùn means 'meat'.

=== Nasalization ===
Nasalization of vowels is phonemic. The root *ghèl means 'scrape', while the root *ghę̀l means 'roll'. Nasal vowels also contrast with vowels followed by /n/.

== Orthography ==
The orthography of the Kwadcha Tsek'ene dictionary uses the following letters.

Kwadacha Tsek'ene alphabet
Letter	IPA	
Letter	Syll. init.	Syll. final
’	ʔ	
a	ɑ	
à	ɑ˩	
ą	ɑ̃	
ą̀	ɑ̃˩	
b	p	-
ch	t͡ʃʰ	-
ch’	t͡ʃ’	-
d	d	-
dl	tɬ	-
dz	ts	-
e	e	
ę	ẽ	
è	e˩	
ę̀	ẽ˩	
g	k	-
gw	kʷ	-
h	h	
i	ɪ	-
į	ɪ̃	-
ì	ɪ˩	-
į̀	ɪ̃˩	-
j	tʃ	-
ii	i	
įį	ĩ	
ìì	i˩	
į̀į̀	ĩ˩	
k	kʰ	k
k’	k’	-
kh	x	
gh	ɣ	
kw	kʷ	-
kw’	kʷ’	-
l	l	
lh	ɬ	
m	m	
n	n	
o	o	
ǫ	õ	
ò	o˩	
ǫ̀	õ˩	
oo	u	
ǫǫ	ũ	
òò	u˩	
ǫ̀ǫ̀	ũ˩	
p	pʰ	p
s	s	
z	z	
sh	ʃ	
t	tʰ	t
t’	t’	-
tl	tɬ	
tl’	tɬ’	-
ts	tsʰ	ts
ts’	ts’	-
u	ɐ	-
ų	ɐ̃	-
ù	ɐ˩	-
ų̀	ɐ̃˩	-
w	w	
yh	ç	-
y	j	
zh	ʒ	-

In addition, ⟨wu⟩ represents /ʊ/, ⟨iii⟩ represents /iː/, ⟨ee⟩ represents /eː/, and ⟨aa⟩ represents /ɑː/.

== Vocabulary ==
These words are from the FirstVoices dictionary for Kwadacha Tsek'ene dialect.

Kwadacha Tsek'ene	English
dune	man, person
tlįį	dog
wudzįįh	caribou
yus	snow
chǫ	rain
k’wus	cloud
kwùn	fire (n)
’įįbèh	summer
too	water
mun	lake
nun	land
tselh	axe
ʼukèʼ	foot
’àtse	my grandfather
’àtsǫǫ	my grandmother
lhìghè’	one
lhèkwudut’e	two
tadut’e	three
dįįdut’e	four
ǫ	yes
Tlįį duchę̀’ ’ehdasde	January
Dahyusè’ nùkehde wìlę	February
’Iihts’ii nùtsudawit’į̀į̀h	March
Nùts’iide	March
Dasè’	April
’Ut’ǫ̀’ kùlhaghnukehde wìlę	May
’Ut’ǫ̀’ kùnuyehde	May
Jìje dinììdulh	July
Yhììh nunutsunde wìlę	August
Yhììh ukudeh’àsde	September
’Udììtl’ǫh ’uwit’į̀į̀h	October
Yus ’ut’į̀į̀h	November
Khuye ’uwììjàh	December

== Bibliography ==
- Hargus, Sharon (1988). The Lexical Phonology of Sekani. Outstanding Dissertations in Linguistics. New York: Garland. ISBN 0-8240-5187-4.
  - Original dissertation: Hargus, Sharon Louise (1985). The Lexical Phonology of Sekani (PhD dissertation). Los Angeles: University of California.
- Mithun, Marianne (1999). The Languages of Native North America. Cambridge: Cambridge University Press. ISBN 9780521298759.

=== Articles ===
- Hargus, Sharon (26 June 2010). Effects on consonant duration in Fort Ware Tsek'ene (PDF). Athabaskan/Dene Languages Conference. Eugene, OR. Archived from the original (PDF) on 3 March 2016.
  - "References" (PDF). Archived from the original (PDF) on 3 March 2016.
- Hargus, Sharon (2009). Causatives and transitionals in Kwadacha Tsek'ene (PDF). Athabaskan Languages Conference. Berkeley, CA. Archived from the original (PDF) on 4 March 2016.
- Hargus, Sharon (10 July 2010). Phonetic vs. phonological rounding in Athabaskan languages (PDF). LabPhon 12. Albuquerque, NM.
  - References: "References" (PDF). Archived from the original (PDF) on 4 March 2016.
  - Journal article: Hargus, Sharon (2012). "Deg Xinag Rounding Assimilation: A case study in phonologization". Journal of Laboratory Phonology. 3 (1): 163–193. doi:10.1515/lp-2012-0010.
