= The Thumb (Omineca) =

Mountain in British Columbia, Canada

- Location within British Columbia
- Interactive map of The Thumb

Highest point
- Elevation: 1,854 m (6,083 ft)
- Prominence: 189 m (620 ft)
- Coordinates: 56°09′47.2″N 126°44′48.8″W

Geography
- Location: British Columbia, Canada
- District: Cassiar Land District
- Parent range: Connelly Range; Hogem Ranges; Omineca Mountains
- Topo map: NTS 94D2 Salix Creek

Geology
- Mountain type: Volcanic plug
- Last eruption: Unknown; Quaternary age

The Thumb is a mountain located 7 km (4 mi) south of Sitchiada Mountain on the east side of Bear Lake, on the divide between the upper Omineca River and the basin of the Bear River in the Omineca Country of the Central-North Interior of British Columbia, Canada. As the Omineca is part of the Arctic Ocean drainage, via the Peace and Mackenzie Rivers, and the Bear is in the basin of the Skeena River, which drains to the Pacific, The Thumb is located on the Continental Divide.

== Geology ==
The Thumb is the largest in a cluster of roughly seven volcanic plugs. They are surrounded by the remains of eroded cinder cones, lava flows and dikes. Although the plugs have not been radiometrically dated, the existence of loose scoria and related intravalley lava flows to the current topography indicates they formed in the last 2.5 million years of the Quaternary period.

The vertical structure of The Thumb develops a prominent monument rising approximately 189 m (620 ft) above smoothly rising landscape along the ridge of the Connelly Range. The Thumb is largely made of columnar basalt bounded by pockets of breccia comprising clasts of the basal sandstone that formed during the Paleocene period.

The Thumb consists of alkali olivine basalt along with other Quaternary volcanic plugs in the Omineca Mountains. The basalt comprises phenocrysts of clinopyroxene and labradorite. Volcanic plugs in the Omineca Mountains, such as The Thumb, are located at the outermost boundary of all major volcanic belts in British Columbia, and their origins are not well-defined.

== See also ==
- List of volcanoes in Canada
- List of Northern Cordilleran volcanoes
- Volcanism of Canada
- Volcanism of Western Canada
