= Omineca Provincial Park and Protected Area =

Provincial park

- IUCN category II (national park)
- Location within British Columbia
- Interactive map of Omineca Provincial Park and Protected Area
- Location: Bulkley-Nechako RD, British Columbia, Canada
- Nearest city: Mackenzie
- Coordinates: 55°51′50″N 124°37′56″W
- Area: 135,434 ha (522.91 sq mi)
- Established: 11 April 2001
- Governing body: BC Parks

Omineca Provincial Park and Protected Area is a provincial park and protected area located in the north-central interior of British Columbia, Canada. It was established on 11 April 2001 by BC Parks to protect provincially significant riparian and wetland habitats along the Omineca River.

The community of Germansen Landing and North Takla Reserve #12 are enclaves within the park and protected area.

== History ==
The Takla Lake First Nation have inhabited the region around the Omineca River since time immemorial.

In 1869, the discovery of gold in nearby Vital Creek brought thousands of miners to the region. In 1870, the community of Germansen Landing was founded and was a major hub of mining activities along the Omineca River.

== Geography ==
The park is centred around the Omineca River Valley, a broad flat-bottomed valley located within the Swannell Ranges through which the Omineca River meanders from the west to the east. Here, the river creates a vast wetland corridor interspersed with dense forest growth that extends down from the surrounding mountains. The river then turns north at the foot of the Wolverine Range before emptying into the Omineca Arm of Williston Lake.

The park also protects Germansen Lake, a large alpine lake located just south of the Omineca River Valley.

== Ecology ==
The forests and wetlands of the Omineca River Valley provide critical habitat for mammal species such as wolverine, moose, and blue-listed boreal woodland caribou.

== See also ==
- Muscovite Lakes Provincial Park – a nearby provincial park
