= Nation (disambiguation) =

A nation is a unified social community.

Nation or Nations may also refer to:

== Geography ==
- Nation Peak, British Columbia, Canada
- The Nation, Ontario - a municipality in Eastern Ontario, Canada
- Nation River (British Columbia), Canada
  - Nation Lakes, four lakes along that river
  - Nation Mountain, a mountain to the north of one of those lakes
- Nation station, a station of the Paris Metro and commuter rail service

== People ==
- Nation (surname)
- Nation (wrestler), ring name of American professional wrestler Sesugh Uhaa

== Newspapers ==
- Nation (Australian periodical) (1958–1972), fortnightly
- The Nation, American progressive magazine
- Daily Nation, Kenyan daily newspaper
- The Nation (Nigeria), Nigerian daily newspaper
- The Nation Barbados, daily newspaper

== Music ==
- Nation Records, a record label

=== Albums ===
- N.A.T.I.O.N. (2019), an album by Bad Wolves
- Nation (Dr. Acula album) (2012)
- Nation (Sepultura album) (2001)

=== Songs ===
- "Nations", a song by Angels of Light from Everything Is Good Here/Please Come Home (2003)

== Other uses ==
- In the Hebrew Bible, "the nations" generally refers to the gentiles, the nations which are not Jewish
- Nation (nightclub), a nightclub in Washington, D.C.
- Nation (novel), by Terry Pratchett, first published 2008
- Nation (university), a historical association of students based on their birthplace or ethnicity
- Nation Alliance (Turkey), an electoral and political alliance in Turkey
- Nation Broadcasting Corporation, a broadcasting network in the Philippines
- Nation, a nightclub in Liverpool, England, which hosted Cream (nightclub)
- Nation, a series of Singapore public gay parties

== See also ==
- The Nation (disambiguation)
- Nation's Giant Hamburgers, a restaurant chain in California
- Nation state, a geopolitical entity
- National (disambiguation)
- The National (disambiguation)
- Nationality (disambiguation)
