= Sustut Peak =

Mountain in British Columbia, Canada

Coordinates: 56°35′11″N 126°34′53″W

Sustut Peak, 2,481 m (8,140 ft), prominence: 1,231 m (4,039 ft), is the highest summit in the drainage of the Sustut River in British Columbia, Canada. Located in the Hogem Ranges west of Sustut Lake, which is at the Sustut River's headwaters, it is 8 km (5 mi) southwest of the road to the Kemess Mine.

== See also ==
- Sustut Park and Protected Area
