= Deserters Canyon =

Canyon in British Columbia, Canada

Geography
- Location: Fraser-Fort George, Omineca, British Columbia
- Coordinates: 56°55′59″N 124°57′05″W
- River: Finlay River

Location
- Interactive map of Deserters Canyon

Deserters Canyon is on the Finlay River in the Omineca region of central British Columbia, Canada. The canyon is just upstream (north) from the tip of the Finlay Arm on Lake Williston, the reservoir created by the W. A. C. Bennett Dam. By road along the west shore of the waterways, the locality is about 162 kilometres (101 mi) northwest of Finlay Forks and 523 kilometres (325 mi) northwest of Prince George.

== Name origin ==
In May 1824, Samuel Black of the Hudson's Bay Company (HBC) made the first European exploration of the Finlay headwaters. While camping at the lower end of the canyon, Black observed what would become known as Deserters Peak, but grossly underestimated its height. That night, the two members of the party assigned to keep first watch deserted with a small canoe loaded with provisions. Their decision was likely motivated by the anticipated toil of carrying the baggage and canoe over the steep hill to reach the upper canyon and the roar of the rapids, which suggested the more difficult parts of the expedition lay ahead. After completing the portage northward, the remainder rejoined the river. Over the following weeks, Black's drive and energy propelled the party whenever morale was low.

The starving deserters surrendered on finally reaching the HBC Île-à-la-Crosse post in July. The men were taken to York Factory, found guilty, publicly humiliated, jailed for a week, and sent to remote posts. Another account mentions Norway House, before the assigning to outposts for a further three years service. Indigenous desertions from the expedition were the interpreter and his wife in July, and a week later, the guide in August, leaving only six of the original party. The guide had openly talked about personally deserting during the days preceding the May desertions, and the interpreter had done likewise in mid-June. In mid-September, on the return journey, the expedition reached the place Black named Rascals Portage in his notebooks, which he revised to Deserters Portage in his journals. Their canoes successfully negotiated the rapids and camp was made 6 to 8 kilometres (4 to 5 mi) downstream.

== Geology ==
The Finlay is part of the Rocky Mountain Trench, where glacial and alluvial deposits make up the riverbed. Setbacks in the cliff face at up to 60 metres (200 ft) above the canyon floor indicate a higher base existed, probably before Deserters Canyon was created. Titled the "Deserters Canyon" advance, an earlier theory stated a separate glacial advance reached the lower Finlay. However, the canyon till has since been identified as resedimented diamicton from an earlier advance.

Very little bedrock is visible along the river except at the canyon, where the river has carved through a belt of hard conglomerate and sandstone for about 800 metres (0.50 mi), creating low walls. At the head of the canyon, the river narrows from between 180 and 230 metres (600 and 750 ft) to 49 metres (160 ft).

== Passaging ==
When R.G. McConnell led an expedition up the Finlay in 1893, the party passed through the canyon. This was the first exploration beyond the location of Fort Grahame since Black's visit in 1824.

Passaging the canyon was dangerous at high water. In the late 1890s, prospectors followed the portage track on the west bank, which First Nations had developed in the distant past. A canoe travelling upriver would access the portage via a wide sandbar, which lay just inside the lower canyon. The trail rose about 90 metres (300 ft) from this point.

In 1908, an 5.5-metre (18 ft) flat bottomed boat travelling downstream was unloaded, before being guided by ropes over the first rapids and paddled through second.

The Finlay was navigable by light draught steamboats at medium stages of water as far north as the canyon. By the 1910s, it was surmised if the canyon was cleared of debris, steamboats could pass through and reach Long Canyon, because Deserters Canyon (the only difficult section) was no worse than the Fort George Canyon on the Fraser River.

In 1930, hazardous rocks were removed to facilitate the passage of boats, and the portage trail, used during impassable water, was upgraded.

By 1940, river freighters with large powerful engines could easily negotiate the canyon, except in extreme high water.

By the 1960s, a small inboard motor could power a boat upstream. On a downstream run, a boat could pass through the canyon in three minutes.

== Crime ==
A police sergeant claimed a double homicide occurred in a cabin at the canyon around 1920. According to the anecdote, one victim was left lying on the cabin floor. Six years later, a second victim was discovered beneath the floorboards after an individual allegedly confessed to his crimes, before committing suicide. Accounts in 1926 mentioned both bodies were discovered in 1920, possibly dying in a duel, and the 1926 death was deemed an unrelated suicide.

In 1940, a resident, who had deserted his wife in Alberta, received an 18-month prison sentence for bigamy.

In February 1944, when a resident trapper was fatally shot, his cabin roommate pursued the killer but suffered the same fate. In November 1945, the Court of Appeal endorsed the lower court verdict, and the murderer was hanged that month.

By 1980, graffiti on the rockfaces had become a concern.

== Commerce ==
By the mid-1920s, John H. Weisner operated a general store at Whitewater, a short distance upriver of Deserters Canyon. In spring 1928, Elizabeth Overn purchased the store and a freighting outfit from Weisner. However, he failed to apply the proceeds toward a $2,280 debt owed to John Strand. After Strand obtained a writ, the sheriff seized the store and contents during fall 1928 (which largely included new merchandise bought by Overn) and sold the lot to the HBC. The subsequent action by Overn against the sheriff, the HBC, and Wilson & Wilson was successful and the court awarded her $10,000 for the merchandise and $1,000 in general damages.

The HBC relocated the store to the junction of the Fox, Kwadacha and Finlay rivers, renaming the post Fort Ware in 1938. Placer mining in the canyon occurred at least during that decade.

In 1960, Fletcher Challenge Canada built a bridge over the Finlay and 4 kilometres (2 mi) of forestry service road for logging trucks.

== Nearby locations ==
=== Barge camp ===
Barge Camp was about 8 kilometres (5 mi) upstream. The site was a camping spot for large parties in 1897 during the Klondike Gold Rush. The name came from the large barge, which ferried prospectors across the Finlay. A decade later, the abandoned barge lay upon the river bank.

=== Ed Bird – Estella Lakes Provincial Park ===
In 2001, the Ed Bird – Estella Lakes Provincial Park was established due west on the opposite side of the canyon.

=== Tsay Keh Dene ===
Tsay Keh Dene is a significant First Nations reserve about 3 kilometres (2 mi) south of Deserters Canyon but 16 kilometres (10 mi) by road.

=== Ingenika Point ===
Ingenika Point is a small non-residential reserve about 15 kilometres (9 mi) south of the canyon but 27 kilometres (17 mi) by road. In the early 1970s, a 13-kilometre (8 mi) road was built northward from the Point so that the cartage of freight could avoid the canyon.

== Maps ==
- "Finlay River map". archive.org. 1895.
- "Omineca and Finlay River Basins map". arcabc.ca. 1917.
- "Northern British Columbia map". arcabc.ca. 1933.
