= Deserters Peak =

Mountain summit in British Columbia, Canada

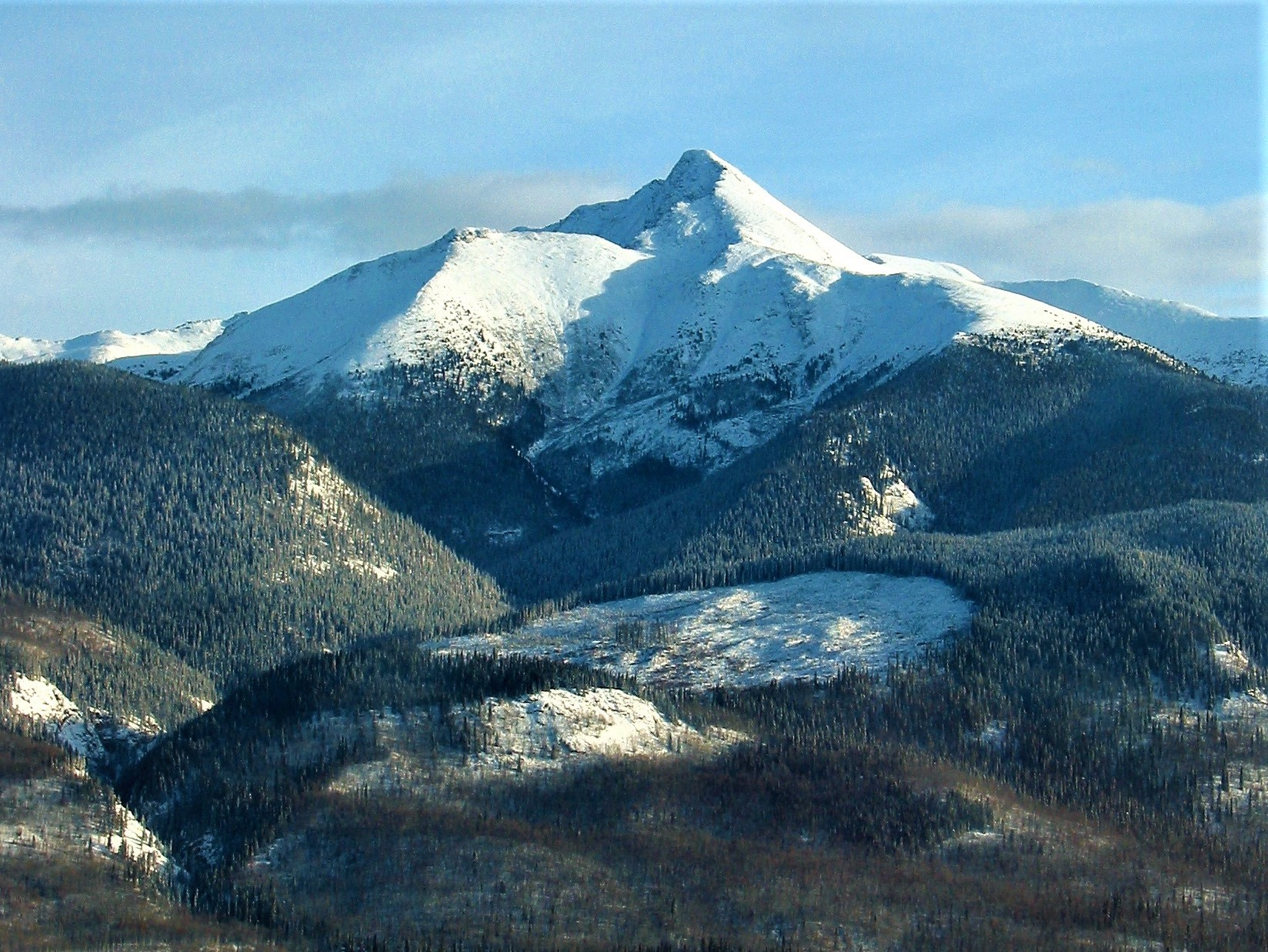
- West aspect

Highest point
- Elevation: 2,274 m (7,461 ft)
- Prominence: 1,325 m (4,347 ft)
- Parent peak: Mount Ulysses (3,024 m)
- Isolation: 25.1 km (15.6 mi)
- Listing: Mountains of British Columbia
- Coordinates: 56°58′05″N 124°54′19″W

Geography
- Location within British Columbia Location within Canada
- Interactive map of Deserters Peak
- Country: Canada
- Province: British Columbia
- District: Cassiar Land District
- Parent range: Deserters Range; Muskwa Ranges; Northern Rocky Mountains
- Topo map: NTS 94C15 Chowika Creek

Deserters Peak is a mountain summit in British Columbia, Canada.

== Description ==
Deserters Peak, elevation 2,274-meters (7,461-feet), is the highest point of the Deserters Range, which is a subrange of the Muskwa Ranges of the Northern Rocky Mountains. It is situated along the east side of the Rocky Mountain Trench near the northern end of Williston Lake. Precipitation runoff from the peak drains into Deserters Creek and Rubyred Creek which are both tributaries of the Finlay River. Topographic relief is significant as the summit rises approximately 1,600 meters (5,250 ft) above the Finlay River in 5.5 km (3.4 mi).

== Etymology ==
The mountain's toponym was officially adopted June 4, 1953, by the Geographical Names Board of Canada. The mountain and Deserters Creek are named in association with Deserters Canyon which is immediately west of the mountain where the creek flows into Finlay River. The canyon's name refers to two men in Samuel Black's 1824 exploration party who decamped (deserted) at this location on May 28 during an expedition to find the headwaters of the Finlay River.

== Climate ==
Based on the Köppen climate classification, Deserters Peak is located in a subarctic climate zone with cold, snowy winters, and mild summers. Winter temperatures can drop below −20 °C with wind chill factors below −30 °C.

== Gallery ==
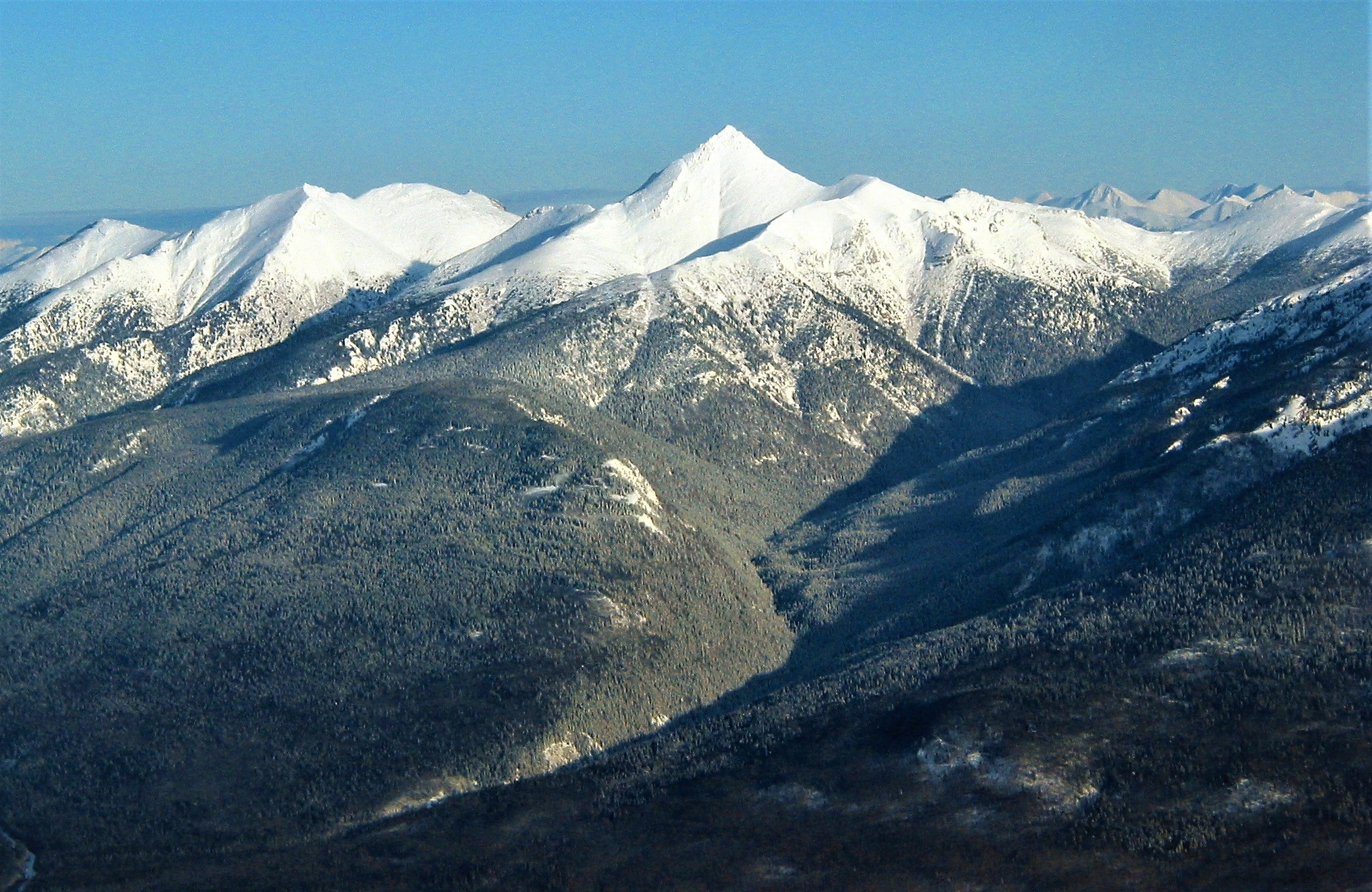
South aspect

== See also ==
- Geography of British Columbia
