= Tatlatui Lake =

Lake in British Columbia, Canada

- Location within British Columbia
- Location: Tatlatui Provincial Park, Northern Interior of British Columbia
- Coordinates: 56°55′30″N 127°18′58″W
- Primary outflows: Firesteel River
- Basin countries: Canada

Tatlatui Lake is a lake in the Tatlatui Range of the Omineca Mountains of the Northern Interior of British Columbia, Canada. It is the source of the Firesteel River, the uppermost left tributary of the Finlay River, which begins just southeast at Thutade Lake, which is considered the ultimate source of the Mackenzie River. The lake and adjoining summits are part of Tatlatui Provincial Park.

== See also ==
- List of lakes of British Columbia
