= Pelly Peak =

Mountain in British Columbia, Canada

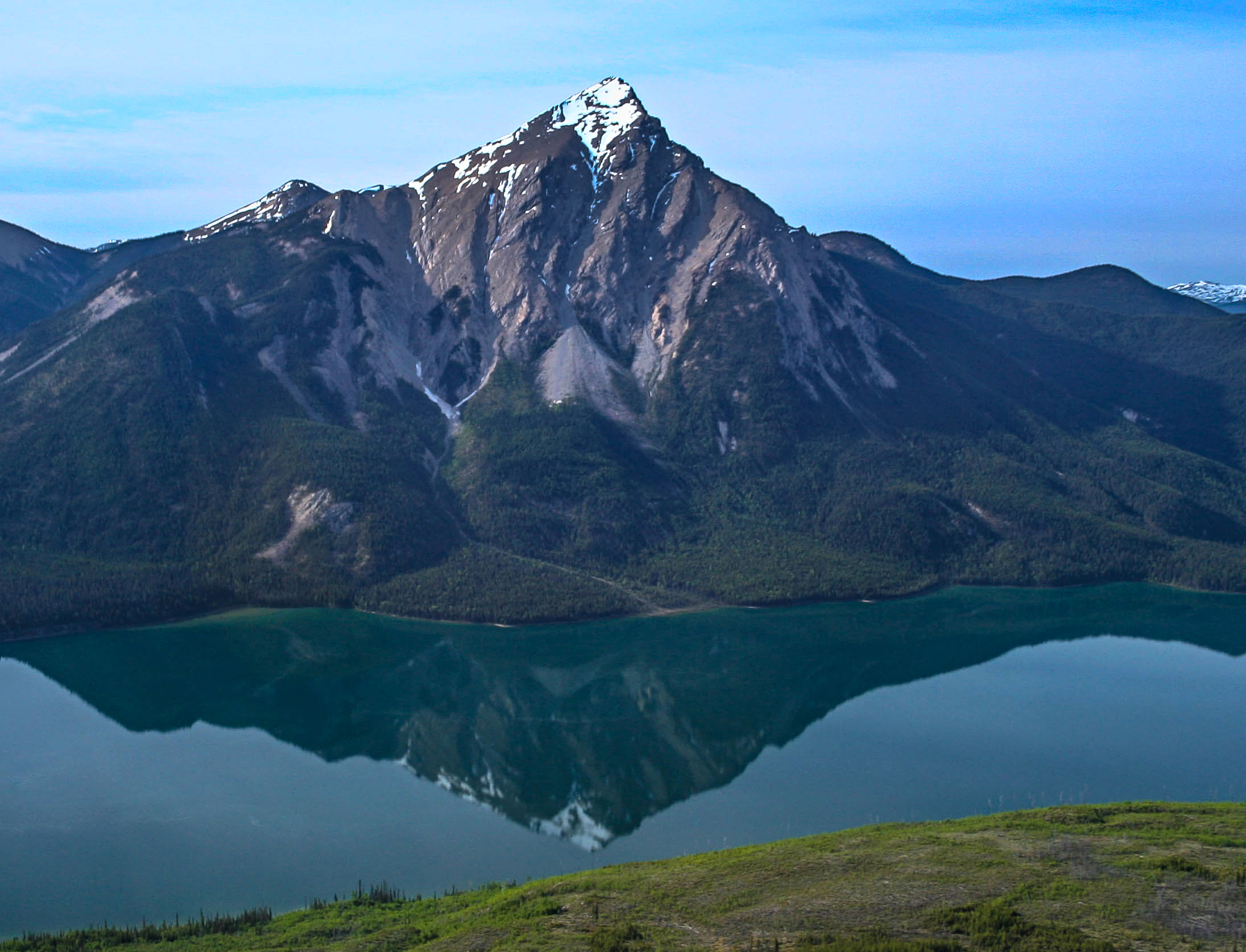
- Pelly Peak reflected in Pelly Lake

Highest point
- Elevation: 2,048 m (6,719 ft)
- Prominence: 592 m (1,942 ft)
- Parent peak: Barrier Peak (2106 m)
- Listing: Mountains of British Columbia
- Coordinates: 56°50′09″N 125°23′04″W

Geography
- Location within British Columbia Location within Canada
- Location: British Columbia, Canada
- District: Cassiar Land District
- Parent range: Omineca Mountains; Russel Range
- Topo map: NTS 94C14 Ed Bird Creek

Pelly Peak, is a 2,048-metre (6,719-foot) mountain summit in the Russel Range of the Omineca Mountains in northern British Columbia, Canada. The mountain is situated west of the head of Finlay Reach of Williston Lake, and a remote 67 km (42 mi) south of Fort Ware in the Cassiar Land District. It rises 1,250 m (4,100 ft) above the south shore of Pelly Lake. Its nearest higher peak is Barrier Peak, 5.0 km (3.1 mi) to the east. Precipitation runoff from the mountain drains into Pelly Creek, a tributary of the Ingenika River. Sir John Pelly (1777–1852) served as Governor of Hudson's Bay Company for three decades, and his name is attached to many geographic features in Canada, including but not limited to Pelly River, Pelly Mountains, Pelly Island, Pelly Bay, Mount Pelly, and Fort Pelly. The peak's name was officially adopted June 4, 1953, by the Geographical Names Board of Canada. Based on the Köppen climate classification, Pelly Peak is located in a subarctic climate zone with cold, snowy winters, and mild summers. Temperatures can drop below −20 °C with wind chill factors below −30 °C.

== See also ==
- Geography of British Columbia
