= Samuel Black =

Scottish explorer of western Canada

Samuel Black (May 3, 1780 – February 8, 1841) was a Scottish fur trader and explorer, a clerk in the New North West Company (XYC) and Wintering Partner in the North West Company (NWC), and later clerk, chief trader, and chief factor in the Hudson's Bay Company (HBC) for the Columbia District. In 1824, he explored the Finlay River and its tributaries in present-day north-central British Columbia, Canada, including the Muskwa, Omineca and Stikine for the HBC. His journals were published by the Hudson's Bay Record Society in 1955.

== Early life and career ==
Black was born in Tyrie, Aberdeenshire, Scotland, the oldest child and only son to John Black, from the parish on Tyrie, and Mary Leith, from the parish of Bodichell. Black also had two sisters, Ann and Mary. His baptism was witnessed by George Leith and Janet Black. It is noted in the baptism record that Black was "illegitimate," though, on June 24, 1781, John Black and Mary Leith are noted in the parish marriage records in Pitsligo as "having been contracted and claimed were married" prior to the birth of Samuel. Black's father died four years after Black's birth.

Black came to Lower Canada (present day Quebec) in 1802 in the service of the XY Company as a clerk, perhaps encouraged by his maternal uncle and fur trader, George Leith, and probably joined the firm of Leith, Jamieson and Company, part of the XYC. He already had relatives living in Canada at the time of his arrival. At the joining of the XYC and NWC in 1804, Black "passed with the Company's organisation," and went to work for the North West Company, headquartered in Montreal. Assigned to work in the Athabasca Department (mostly in present-day Alberta) in 1805, Black served as a clerk there for fifteen years. For much of this time, he took an active role in the sometimes violent competition between the NWC and the HBC. In 1816, Black was made a NWC Wintering Partner.

By 1820, Black's violent activities against Hudson's Bay Company employees had so imperiled his safety that he withdrew across the Rockies to the North West Company fort at McLeod Lake in New Caledonia, as an arrest had been sworn out for him.

At the merger of the NWC and HBC in 1821, Black violent opposition against the HBC caused him to be one of the few NWC men, along with Peter Skene Ogden, not included in the merger. But in 1823, Black was appointed as a clerk and then Chief Trader to the post at Fort St. John.

== Explorations ==
In the summer of 1824, at the behest of Sir George Simpson, governor of the Hudson's Bay Company, Black was assigned to set out with a crew of ten from Rocky Mountain Portage (now Hudson's Hope) "to the Sources of Finlay's Branch [the Finlay River] and Northwest Ward." The purpose of the expedition was to assess the region's suitability for extension of the fur trade, and to check the advance of the Russian fur trade from the west.

The river had been partially explored by John Finlay, a colleague of Alexander Mackenzie, in 1797. In 1793, Mackenzie had ascended the Peace River to the point where it is formed by the Finlay flowing from the north, and the Parsnip River from the south. Mackenzie had taken the Parsnip, and from there completed a complicated route to the Pacific Ocean. It is thought that Finlay may have decided to probe the northern branch of the Peace in order to determine if it afforded a better route to the Pacific than the one taken by Mackenzie. Nonetheless, it would appear from the information Black had that Finlay had only made it as far as the Ingenika River, about 130 km north of the Finlay River's confluence with the Parsnip (where the Peace begins).

The journey up the Finlay River's 450 km length and up its tributaries, the Toodoggone River and the Firesteel River, took Black and his men to what is considered the ultimate source of the Mackenzie River at Thutade Lake (at the head of the Firesteel). Proceeding sometimes on foot, sometimes by raft, Black and a smaller crew explored the region of the Spatsizi Plateau, there finding one of the sources of the Stikine River and so reaching the boundary between the Arctic and Pacific drainages. Journeying north-eastward, Black crossed another divide — this time between the Stikine and Liard Rivers — and rafted some way down the Kechika by way of its tributary, the Turnagain River, before returning again down the Finlay.

Black's vivid journal account of the expedition conveys the extreme hardships faced by the crew, and what Black believed was the general privation of the country — both as a source of food and of furs. Two of his men deserted in the course of the expedition, giving Deserters Canyon its name. The river proved to be a rough and difficult to traverse, and Black's assessment was that this fact — coupled with what he perceived to be the general absence of marketable furs or a healthy First Nations population — made the territory impracticable for the extension of the fur trade or as a northern route to the Pacific. Nonetheless, Black and his crew had completed an extraordinarily extensive survey of what is now north-central British Columbia. They had not only journeyed to the source of the Mackenzie River, but had travelled over the Arctic-Pacific divide, and to the sources of two major watersheds — the Stikine and Liard Rivers.

== Later career ==
After an interval at Fort Dunvegan and York Factory, Black was appointed Chief Factor of Fort Nez Percés (near present-day Wallula, Washington) in 1825. This posting allowed Black to exercise his renowned vigour in opposing competition, in this instance from American traders. His difficulties in maintaining a good relationship with the local Nez Perce clients led to Black's transfer to the company's Thompson's River Post (now Kamloops) in 1830. In 1837, Black was appointed as Chief Factor in charge of the inland posts of the Columbia. Here Black was murdered on February 8, 1841, shot by a nephew of Chief Tranquille of the local group of Secwepemc (Shuswap) following a minor quarrel. He is interred near Kamloops.

== Places named for Black ==
- The Finlay River was locally called Black's River by early fur traders, but the Hudson's Bay Company had inadvertently filed Black's journals under John Finlay's name, fixing his name as the name of the river Black traversed.
- The fur trader and explorer, John McLeod, re-located the river that Black discovered (the Kechika) and named it Black's River; however, the Canadian government officially recorded the name as the Kechika.
- The Samuel Black Range lies between the Toodoggone and Firesteel Rivers.
- Black Lake is a small lake on the south-western side of the Samuel Black Range.
