= Finlay Forks =

Finlay Forks, British Columbia
- Former settlement
- Location of Finlay Forks in British Columbia
- Coordinates: 55°59′00″N 123°50′00″W
- Country: Canada
- Province: British Columbia
- Land District: Cariboo
- Regional District: Fraser-Fort George
- Geographic Region: Omineca Mountains
- Area codes: 250, 778

Finlay Forks (also called Finlay Junction and sometimes misspelt Findlay), is the confluence of the Finlay River and Parsnip River in British Columbia, Canada. The Finlay Bay Recreation Site, on the southeast bank, is about three kilometres (1.9 mi) southeast of the former settlement (on the earlier southeast bank) that is now submerged beneath Williston Lake. Like the river, it was named after explorer John Finlay. The access road from Mackenzie is called the Parsnip West FSR (formerly Finlay Forks Road and Parsnip Forest Road).

== History ==
=== Waterways & Trails ===
The first European explorers travelling through the Forks were Alexander Mackenzie in 1793, and Simon Fraser in 1805.

Aboriginal trails laced the valleys for thousands of years. With the Klondike Gold Rush, the Canadian government sought to identify safe overland routes for prospectors to reach the Yukon from Edmonton. As water transport could be expensive, these were intended as wagon trails. The initial NWMP Trail, surveyed during 1897–98 by Inspector J.D. Moodie with First Nations guides, passed along the northeast bank of the Forks. Hordes coming from the south would join the trail here. Prospectors also passed through the vicinity on their way to gold rushes at Barkerville (1860s), Omineca (1871–72), and McConnell Creek (1907–08).

During the ice-free months, passenger and freight vessels regularly ran between Summit Lake and Hudson's Hope via the Crooked River, the Parsnip River, Finlay Forks, and the Peace River. However, low water levels would shorten the navigation season.

Four of the potential sites for the W. A. C. Bennett Dam were at the western end of the Peace River canyon near the Forks. Originally, the dam and powerhouse were planned for the Finlay Forks-Wicked River junction seven miles (11 km) east. On drilling down 400 feet in the middle of the Peace River, the failure to reach solid rock identified an unbridgeable crevice.

By the summer of 1969, the T-shaped reservoir was 80-percent full. The combination of high waves and floating logs could make Williston Lake treacherous, with at least eight persons missing and believed drowned in the lake during 1970–1985. The worst area is at Finlay Forks, where the wind can come from north, south, east or west.

When his 15-tonne logging truck broke through the ice in the vicinity, Brian Wykes (1956–83) drowned.

=== Road & Rail Proposals ===
The joint Peace Pass/Finlay Forks proposals form part of the Pine Pass highway and railway developments.

In 1913, Premier McBride envisaged a PGE Alaskan rail route passing through the Forks.

In the late 1920s, Mr. Armishaw sought to establish a trail southwest to Manson Creek. A rail line from the Forks to the Ferguson mine in the Ingenika was proposed. Charter flights from Prince George to this mine were taking less than two hours to what had previously been a week by water and land.

The 1930s survey for Route B of the proposed Alaska Highway, which was promoted as the Canadian preference, was via this locality. By 1935, the leaning was for a Prince George-Finlay Forks road via Summit Lake rather than Manson Creek, however this choice was not universal, and further surveys ensued. The latter, known as the Turgeon Highway, did not reach Manson Creek until 1939. The project required a further 40 miles of heavy construction if extended to Finlay Forks, and progress was long delayed.

A PGE link to a possible Alaskan rail route continued to include Finlay Forks. In 1965, an access road north from Highway 97 reached the settlement and construction commenced on the Manson Creek link. A three-times-weekly road freight service with Prince George was soon implemented. The 1966 PGE spur covered only the 23 miles (37 km) to Mackenzie.

=== Community ===
Established in 1813, the location was an important Hudson's Bay Company fur trading post and settlement.

Two general stores opened in 1913. That year, the residents formed a community association and petitioned the postal authorities to rename the location as 'Finparpea', compiled from the first three letters of the three rivers. World War I superseded any action, and few returned to their holdings after the conflict. In 1915, there were about 35 settlers, and the following year, the Fort Grahame band of Sekani established a reserve nearby. William Fox, the Hudson's Bay factor (mercantile agent), was the inaugural postmaster 1916–18, with mail deliveries 6–8 times each year.

During the 1920s, The Northern Trading Co. also operated a post, Hugh M. Gibson was a storeowner, and the population was about 12. The nucleus of a potential town comprised a few scattered cabins, with Ole Johnson offering visitor accommodation. In 1912, Louis Peterson (c.1852–1933) who took up the first pre-emption at the Forks, was postmaster 1926–29, and ran a trading store until his death. The remaining storekeeper, Alan (alternatively Alex) McKinnon, was also a fur trader, postmaster 1920–25 and 1930–43, and a mine owner. Replenishing his supplies in the summer of 1940, he trucked the 50-ton load from Prince George to Summit Lake, from where it was boated to the Forks. The annual fur auction held at Finlay Forks, comprised many trappers and drew in commercial buyers.

By the 1950s, the Caucasian population numbered four, two of whom were Roy (1889–1984) & Marge (1900–80) McDougall, who ran the trading post and provided visitor accommodation. Marge was also the volunteer first aid attendant for the Sekani and passing itinerants. Arriving in the 1920s, the couple farmed, and Marge served as postmaster 1943–46 and 1948–58. They sold up in 1957, the post-office closed in 1959, and they left 1960/61.

The school was a challenge for maintenance crews, being at the northern tip of School District 57. Catering to logging crews and Sekani, the two classrooms comprised an Atco-style singlewide structure for the primary grades, and a doublewide for the intermediate ones. The Carrier Lumber campsite provided water, power and sewer connections for the classrooms and teacherage. Operating 1968–1971, student enrolments ranged 20–27. On closure, the three portable buildings were removed.

During the 1968 summer, Bud Stuart operated a coffee shop and general store from a tent that evolved into permanent premises. By 1973, Bill Bloor ran the general store. The Finlay Bay Cabins, operated by Kelly Brothers, no longer exist.

=== Communications & Air Services ===
Communications with Prince George were slow, because mail travelled a circuitous route east via Hudson's Hope, Edmonton, and west toward Prince George. The residents appealed for a direct route through Summit Lake, at least during the summer months.

The rivers covered with floating ice, the ballot box for an election was parachuted from a plane. The mere 13 names on the electoral roll signified an expensive exercise in democracy. The locked ballot box took 15 days to reach Hudson's Hope, from where the mail would take a further 10 days to reach Prince George. By the 1950s, the arrival of the ballot box, containing two votes, delayed the final count.

In 1936, a shortwave radiotelephone station opened, which operated in conjunction with a series of similar stations in northern BC and the Yukon. The following year, United Air Transport (UAT) inaugurated a scheduled monthly passenger/freight/mail service for nine months of the year. A half-gallon ice cream consignment was the first occasion it was served in the community. By 1938, the dominion postal inspector's annual visit to Finlay Forks and the surrounding post-offices took five days by air, compared with the previous 40 days by boat. UAT, renamed Yukon Southern Air Transport (YSAT), scheduled a Christmas 1940 mail run. Moving under the joint control of YSAT and Canadian Airways in 1941, the passenger/mail runs continued monthly.

By the 1950s, Central B.C. Airways carried the nine mail deliveries for the year, the radiotelephone station had become redundant and closed, and the community's two-way radio was dependent upon weather conditions. When a plane crashed on making an emergency landing near Finlay Forks in 1950, the pilot and the three passengers survived. Santa would come by plane, but sometimes the weather delayed the event until after Christmas. With flight cancellations, several months of newspapers might arrive together.

The Pacific Western Airlines Prince George-Fort St. John run, which commenced in 1957, provided the irregular passenger, freight and mail service to the Forks. Months later, the ballot box travelled by helicopter.

In 1995, when an amphibian plane crashed shortly after takeoff from Finlay Bay, the three occupants escaped uninjured. The Finlay Bay Water Aerodrome (CAK8) was later abandoned.

=== Law Enforcement ===
In 1924, Constable Muirhead became the inaugural provincial police constable in residence, and mushed over 500 miles to spend Christmas in Prince George. Although federal police questioned the adequacy of provincial policing in the area, a permanent police presence was limited to the 1920s.

In 1930, Alfred (Alf) Jank (1897–1989) was appointed game warden for the Finlay River district, with his headquarters in the forestry cabin at Finlay Forks. Vic Williams replaced him the following year. Vic and a colleague rescued two men from a capsized boat in the Finlay Rapids, but a third person drowned. In 1933, he was appointed coroner in conjunction with his ten-month-each-year game warden role. During the late 1930s, Alf, and Sidney G. Copeland, held the game warden position. In 1940, Sidney apprehended Edward Bird (alias Byrde) at Deserter's Canyon on a charge of bigamy and surrendered him to a police constable for escorting to Prince George.

In 1944, after a social confrontation, Alex Prince (1921–45) murdered trappers Eugene Messmer, 33, and then Hans Pfeuffer, 43, at their cabin in the vicinity. Found in Prince's cabin were Messmer's gold watch, handmade briefcase, rifle, valuable cameras, film, stolen furs and fur stretchers. Based on this evidence, Game Warden Jank executed an arrest on separate charges. The coroner's court reached an open verdict. Alex Prince, Sekani First Nations, stood trial, but damaging inadmissible statements made by a witness prompted a mistrial. At his retrial, Prince was found guilty of murdering Messmer and a stay of proceedings was entered in a second murder charge in the death of Pfeuffer. After an unsuccessful appeal on the grounds of diminished capacity, he was hanged.

In 1964 and 1965, rifle shots wounded separate members of the Poole family on the Finlay Forks reserve. In another shooting incident at a family reunion, May Egnell (1929–68) died, and another woman and boy were injured. The incident arose after a verbal exchange during an intoxicated episode. While Joe Egnell, husband of the deceased was in a physical altercation with Murphy Porter, their wives May and Mary, and Bessie Tomah, were fighting. Although May had pulled a knife, Bessie, 26, was found guilty of manslaughter and received a three-year sentence.

In 1948, Joe Egnell's father, McDonald, and youngest brother, Tony, died, the former of exposure and the latter of pneumonia. His mother trekked 80 miles in cold winter weather to bring her two children to safety. Game Warden Jank and Const. Lyle Oleson conducted the investigation, and Frank identified his father's body. Frank Egnell, 43, shot to death Keon Pierre (1914–71) following an argument at Finlay Forks. Convicted of manslaughter, he was sentenced to two years less a day.

=== Mining & Farming ===
A great deal of mining occurred in the surrounding mountains, rivers and creeks. The increasing market for produce was anticipated to expand farming in the immediate area. Larry Canty acquired 20,000 acres in 1929 for agricultural development. However, the lack of rail lines and roads hampered mining activities. The 1957 site selection for the W. A. C. Bennett Dam confirmed the flooding would submerge many mining and industrial development properties.

=== Forestry ===
By the mid-1910s, the BC forestry department maintained a headquarters at Finlay Forks, which in due course served a fire ranger role. The forest ranger station operated after World War II, and an assistant ranger station was built in 1964. In the mid-1960s, logging contracts were let for those valleys north, south and east of the Forks, which would be flooded by the dam. Donald Adems (Adams alternate spelling), a forestry service engineer on the project, had been the first Caucasian child to live at Finlay Forks.

Further contracts were let for the clearing and burning of inferior timber. Several portable sawmills began operations. Carrier Lumber and Cattermole Timber adopted new ideas such as felling on the ice and sorting later. The latter was located on the west bank of the Parsnip River, two miles south, and was accessed by an ice-bridge. Fires completely gutted its 50,000-foot capacity McLean Lake Mill, and the Courhon Sawmill on Scott Creek at mile 56 of the access road. A forest fire at Mile 43 threatened another mill. Temporary work camps were at Miles 49 and 73.

The forest service established a centre of operations at Finlay Forks. Rising faster than anticipated, the dammed waters created vast logjams and half-submerged trees. In this environment, two tugboat companies and about 25 private logging contractors conducted one of the largest timber salvage operations in North America. At the Forks, Finlay Navigation operated a dispatch base, and Carrier Lumber a sawmill. Sheriffs' sales of assets occurred to settle unpaid wages of Yarkon Industries and workers compensation liabilities of Ashlea Timber at Mile 74½. In 1969, the bush mills disappeared from the pondage area and the first log boom reached Mackenzie from the Finlay drainage. By 1971, further timber salvaging became uneconomical, and Carrier relocated all its operations from Finlay Forks to Mackenzie. On rolling his skidder, operator Vincent Broad was fatally crushed (1951–73).
