= Sustut Lake =

- Bear Wallow Lake
- Location within British Columbia
- Location: Omineca Mountains, British Columbia Interior, British Columbia, Canada
- Coordinates: 56°35′00″N 126°27′00″W
- Type: lake
- River sources: Sustut River
- Primary outflows: Sustut River

Sustut Lake is a lake in the Omineca Mountains of the Northern Interior of British Columbia, Canada, located northwest of Germansen Landing in the Cassiar Land District. It is the source of the Sustut River, which flows roughly west and is a major tributary of the Skeena River. The lake's old, or alternate, name is Bear Wallow Lake. Sustut Peak is located to the west of the lake.

== See also ==
- List of lakes of British Columbia
- Sustut Provincial Park and Protected Area
