= Tenakihi Range =

Mountain range in British Columbia, Canada

- Location within British Columbia

Highest point
- Elevation: 970 m (3,180 ft)
- Coordinates: 56°13′00″N 125°15′00″W

Dimensions
- Area: 1,040 km^{2} (400 mi^{2})

Geography
- Country: Canada
- Province: British Columbia
- Parent range: Swannell Ranges

The Tenakihi Range is a small subrange of the Swannell Ranges of the Omineca Mountains, located between Mesilinka River and Osilinka River in northern British Columbia, Canada.
