= Cascadero Falls =

Waterfall on the Finlay River in British Columbia, Canada

Coordinates: 57°05′53″N 126°54′28″W

Cascadero Falls is a waterfall on the Finlay River in the Northern Interior of British Columbia, Canada, located just below that river's head at the outlet of Thutade Lake. The height of the falls is 180 ft and below it there are numerous cascades or rapids in a twisting course prior to the river's general northeastward trend from this area. The falls are slated for hydroelectric development in connection with the area's mines, the largest of which is the Kemess Mine owned by Northgate Minerals Inc., located just east of the foot of Thutade Lake in the valley of Kemess Creek.

== See also ==
- List of waterfalls
- List of waterfalls in British Columbia
