= Germansen River =

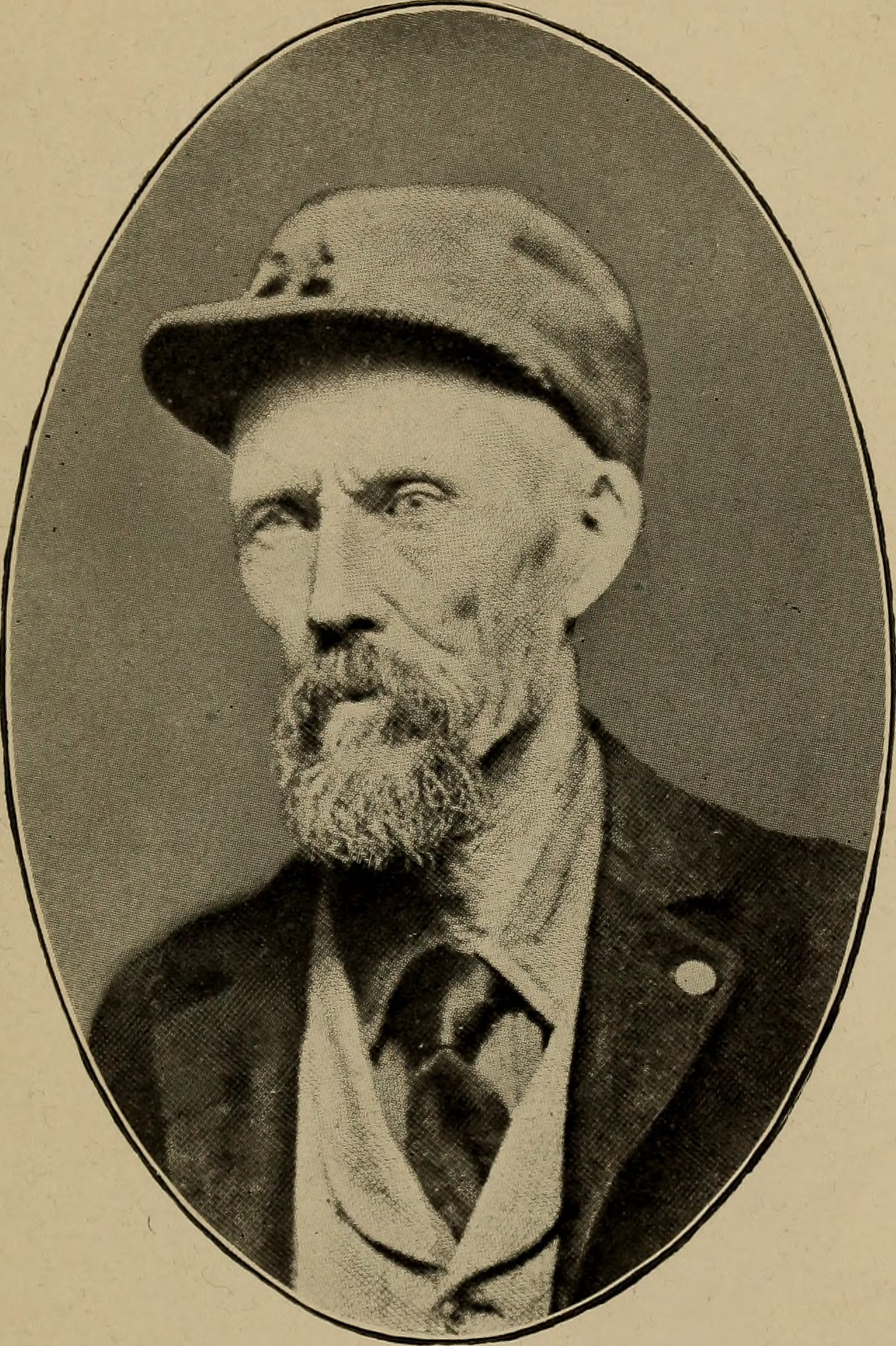
- James Germansen, 1909

- Location within British Columbia

Location
- Country: Canada
- Province: British Columbia
- Region: Omineca
- Regional district: Bulkley–Nechako

Physical characteristics
- Source
  - location: Rocky Mountain Trench
- Mouth: Omineca River
  - coordinates: 55°47′13″N 124°41′59″W
  - elevation: 690 m (2,260 ft)

The Germansen River (formerly a.k.a. Germansen Creek) is in the Omineca region of central British Columbia, Canada. Flowing through Germansen Lake, the river is a major tributary of the Omenica River, which in turn enters Williston Lake. Surrounded by the spread of the Swannell Ranges, the lake is south of Plughat Mountain and north of the Germansen Range, which contains Mount Germansen.

== Name origin ==
In July 1870, James Germansen discovered gold on the creek/river. The earliest newspaper mention of the creek name is October 1870.

During the Omineca Gold Rush of the 1860s, James was known as Old Hogem, which gave the name to a mining camp on the Omineca River, where he charged exorbitant prices at his general store. In 1868, he was the first to travel from that part of the interior to Fort Simpson.

== River course ==
The Germansen River is part of the Rocky Mountain Trench, where glacial and alluvial deposits make up riverbeds. Multiple till units in this river suggest that several oscillations of the ice front occurred in this region during the advance phase of the LGP. Some of the low lying benches and bars possess no overlaying boulder clay, whereas other bedrock benches are overlain with up to 3 metres (10 ft) of auriferous glacial gravels, topped by up to 23 metres (75 ft) of boulder clay. Rock outcrops are greenschist, silicified sericite, thinly bedded argillites, and serpentinite.

The significant tributaries are the South Germansen River, Horseshoe Creek, Little Slate Creek, Goodasany Creek (formerly Mill Creek), Ah Lock Creek, and Plug Hat Creek. The watershed of the river encompasses 22,918 hectares (56,630 acres).

For the most part, the valley is about 76 metres (250 ft) deep and well timbered. The 3-kilometre (2 mi) southeasterly section downriver from the lake outlet is a wide valley in the mature stage of the cycle of erosion. The channel then turns sharply northeast to enter a rock canyon. Exiting the canyon, the river continues 7 kilometres (4.5 mi), before turning northwesterly to flow 13 kilometres (8 mi) to the mouth. After passing through another mature stage valley, a 4-kilometre (2.5 mi) canyon exists at Mill Creek. Beyond is the wide valley of the Omineca River.

== Rock canyon at the forks ==
Cutting in parallel through separate high walled canyons, the Germansen and South Germansen rivers join after covering 1,200 metres (0.75 mi) and 800 metres (0.50 mi) respectively.

In the 1870s, a sawmill operated at the lower end of the canyon.

In 1934, a dirt road was built northward from Fort St. James, which divided nearby into northwestward to the canyon area and southeastward to Manson Creek. The road was graded in 1939, in preparation for gravelling the next year. A passenger transit service operated on the Fort St. James–Germansen Landing route during the early 1940s, mid-1950s, and around 2000. No public transit provider currently exists in the area.

== Germansen Lake ==
The shore length is 43 kilometres (27 mi), the surface area is about 1,800 hectares (4,400 acres), and the elevation is 957 metres (3,140 ft) above sea level. The Germansen Narrows (a.k.a. Gebhardt Arm) is at the western end of the lake.

In 1949, the trail along the north side of the lake was upgraded to a road.

In 1956, the operator of an IH TD-18 drowned when his caterpillar plunged into the lake.

Four camping areas are found along the lakeshore, and Rainbow Cove (on the east side of the narrows) has a combination of open field sites and a few semi-private ones.

== Ferries and bridges ==
A passenger would pull the unattended log raft ferry by rope across the Germansen Narrows. In some form or other, the ferry existed over many decades at the western end of the lake.

In 1948–49, a large scow was placed on the lake to move mining equipment from the east to west end of the lake. About this time, a rock-filled crib replaced the narrows ferry, which in turn was replaced by a king truss bridge in 1954–55.

At one time, a bridge existed over the river at the lake outlet.

== Mining ==
The reported mining earnings for the 1871 season were $400,000, which had fallen to $32,000 for the general area in 1875. By the next year, the mining district was almost deserted. Placer mining for gold has taken place almost continuously since that time by individuals and intermittently by companies. Some hard-rock mining has also occurred. Germansen Placers, established in 1931 and renamed as Germansen Mines in 1934, undertook hydraulic mining about 11 kilometres (7 mi) from the river mouth until 1943. Flumes and a ditches supplied water from the South Germansen River. Another account mentions the source as 3 kilometres (2 mi) downstream from the lake, then along flumes over the South Germansen, before entering a ditch line excavated in 1901.

Downstream and on Plughat Creek, Germansen Ventures, which operated 1937–1942, obtained water from the lake, 24 kilometres (15 mi) away. During 1946–1961, various individuals worked these pits. Prior to 1950, the estimated gold production for the entire Germansen River system totalled 515,851 to 750,776 grams (18,196 to 26,483 oz). In 1966, Grizzly Gold Mines operated a dredge on the river. In 2010, Westwing Enterprises conducted seismic surveys.

== Old Germansen ==
In 1871, a new town being constructed 5 kilometres (3 mi) southeast from the river mouth was to be called Omineca. Instead, the place became known as Germansen. The 12–20 wooden cabins rested on the lower steep sides of the valley, which had been denuded by clearing, burning, and/or flushing.

By 1927, only one couple inhabited the place.

By 1937, a footbridge spanned the river just upstream.

== Germansen Landing ==
Germansen Landing lies at the confluence into the Omineca River.

== South Germansen River ==
From headwaters in the Germansen Range, the river flows northeastward to its mouth. The watershed is 18,426 hectares (45,530 acres).

Geological mapping was conducted on this river by Taiga Consultants in 1980 and Anaconda Canada Exploration in 1982. Angel Jade Mines surveyed hard-rock prospects in 2017.

== Maps ==
- Omineca Mining Division. 1924.
- Germansen River. 1936.
- "Standard Oil BC map". www.davidrumsey.com. 1937.
- Manson Creek Area. 1938.
- "Shell BC map". www.davidrumsey.com. 1956.
