= Peak Range =

Mountain range in British Columbia, Canada

Coordinates: 57°32′00″N 126°47′00″W

- Location within British Columbia

Highest point
- Elevation: 2,500 m (8,200 ft)

Dimensions
- Area: 705 km^{2} (272 mi^{2})

Geography
- Country: Canada
- Province: British Columbia
- Parent range: Swannell Ranges

The Peak Range is a small subrange of the Swannell Ranges of the Omineca Mountains, located on the northwest side of the junction of Toodoggone River and Finlay River in northern British Columbia, Canada.

There is also a Peak Range in Central Queensland.
