= Samuel Black Range =

Mountain range in British Columbia, Canada

- Location within British Columbia

Highest point
- Peak: Samuel Black SW13
- Elevation: 2,120 m (6,960 ft)
- Coordinates: 57°19′40.1″N 127°04′12.0″W

Geography
- Country: Canada
- Region: British Columbia
- Parent range: Omineca Mountains

The Samuel Black Range is a mountain range in the angle of the upper Toodoggone and the Finlay Rivers in northern British Columbia, Canada. It has an area of 808 km^{2} and is a subrange of the Omineca Mountains which in turn form part of the Interior Mountains. The range is named for Samuel Black, the first European to explore the area.

The highest mountain in the Samuel Black Range is the unofficially named Samuel Black SW13 at 2,120 m (6,955 ft).
