= Mosque River =

- Location of mouth of Mosque River

Location
- Country: Canada
- Province: British Columbia

Physical characteristics
- Source: Diagonal Mountain
  - location: Omineca Mountains
  - coordinates: 56°45′9″N 127°16′50″W
  - elevation: 1,700 m (5,600 ft)
- Mouth: Skeena River
  - location: Skeena Mountains
  - coordinates: 56°31′2″N 127°33′28″W
  - elevation: 673 m (2,208 ft)
- Length: 50 km (31 mi)
- Basin size: 499 km^{2} (193 sq mi)
- Discharge
  - average: 15.4 m^{3}/s (540 cu ft/s)

The Mosque River is a tributary of the Skeena River in the Stikine Region of the province of British Columbia, Canada. It originates in the Tatlatui Range of the Skeena Mountains, and flows southwest about 50 km (31 mi) to the Skeena River, about 140 km (87 mi) north of Hazelton and about 160 km (99 mi) east of Stewart. Its watershed covers about 148 km^{2} (57 sq mi), and its mean annual discharge is 15.4 m^{3}/s (540 cu ft/s).

The river's entire watershed is within the traditional territory of the Gitxsan First Nation and is part of the lands currently under negotiation for aboriginal title according to the British Columbia Treaty Process.

The Mosque River was named in 1940, in association with Mosque Mountain.

== Geography ==
The Mosque River originates on the east side of Diagonal Mountain. The continental divide runs along the east and north sides of the Mosque River's watershed. About 5 km (3.1 mi) northeast of the source of the Mosque River, across the continental divide, lies Thutade Lake, the source of the Finlay River.

The Mosque River generally flows southwest, collecting a number of unnamed tributaries before emptying into the Skeena River. Its watershed is located partly in the Skeena Mountains and partly in the Omineca Mountains.

Significant mountains in and around the river's watershed include Fort Mountain (2,030 m (6,660 ft)), Diagonal Mountain (2,210 m (7,250 ft)), South Pass Peak (1,896 m (6,220 ft)), Bird Hill (1,870 m (6,140 ft)), and Mosque Mountain (2,026 m (6,647 ft)). Subranges of the Skeena and Omineca Mountains in the Mosque River's watershed include the Tatlatui Range, Hogem Ranges, and Slamgeesh Range.

== History ==
The Mosque River is in the territory of the Gitxsan First Nation. Gitxsan salmon fishing sites are located at numerous places along the Skeena River, including at the confluence of the Skeena and Mosque Rivers.

The Mosque River was named in 1940, in association with Mosque Mountain, which is located on the southern edge of the river's watershed. At least two other streams are named in association with Mosque Mountain: Islam Creek and Minaret Creek, both of which flow south from Mosque Mountain to the Sustut River. Mosque Mountain was named in 1940, for its dome shape which was thought to resemble a mosque.

The Mosque River watershed is part of the lands currently under negotiation for Gitxsan aboriginal title according to the British Columbia Treaty Process. As of August 2021 the treaty negotiations are in the fourth stage of the process. The Mosque River watershed falls under two of the treaty process's Strategic Engagement Agreements. The northern part of the watershed is included in the Upper Skeena Laxyip Strategic Engagement Agreement. The southern part is included in the Sustut Laxyip Strategic Engagement Agreement.

== See also ==
- List of rivers of British Columbia
