= Swannell Ranges =

Mountain range in British Columbia, Canada

- Location within British Columbia

Highest point
- Elevation: 1,032 m (3,386 ft)

Geography
- Country: Canada
- Region: British Columbia
- Range coordinates: 56°25′N 125°40′W
- Parent range: Omineca Mountains

The Swannell Ranges are a mountain range between the Finlay and Nation Rivers and between the Hogem Ranges and the Finlay Ranges of northern British Columbia, Canada. It has an area of 22932 km^{2} and is a subrange of the Omineca Mountains which in turn form part of the Interior Mountains. They are named in honour of legendary surveyor/explorer Frank Swannell.

== Sub-ranges ==
- Espee Range
- Fishing Range
- Germansen Range
- Ingenika Range
- Kwanika Range
- Kwun Yotasi Range
- Lay Range
- McConnell Range
- Osilinka Ranges
- Peak Range
- Tenakihi Range
- Tucha Range
- Wolverine Range
- Wrede Range
