= Nation Mountain =

Mountain in British Columbia, Canada

Coordinates: 55°16′45″N 125°06′15″W

Nation Mountain, 1884 m / 6181 ft, prominence 764 m, originally Mount Nation, is a mountain in the Omineca Country in the Central Interior of British Columbia, located northwest of Fort St. James. Its name derives from that of the Nation River, whose course is to its south; its summit overlooks Tchentlo Lake, one of four comprising a group known as the Nation Lakes.

== See also ==
- Nation Peak
- Nation (disambiguation)
