= Kwun Yótasi Range =

- Location within British Columbia

Geography
- Country: Canada
- Province: British Columbia
- Range coordinates: 55°16′45″N 125°05′25″W
- Parent range: Swannell Ranges

The Kwun Yótasi Range is a small subrange of the Swannell Ranges of the Omineca Mountains, located north of Tchentlo Lake and Nation Lakes in northern British Columbia, Canada.
