= Tatlatui Range =

Mountain range in British Columbia, Canada

- Location within British Columbia

Geography
- Country: Canada
- Region: British Columbia
- Range coordinates: 56°46′N 127°30′W
- Parent range: Omineca Mountains

The Tatlatui Range is a large and very alpine mountain range on the east flank of the upper Skeena River in northern British Columbia, Canada. It has an area of 2307 km^{2} and is a subrange of the Omineca Mountains which in turn form part of the Interior Mountains. The range features several lakes, the largest of which, Thutade Lake, is at the head of the Finlay River, and is considered the ultimate source of the Mackenzie River. Tatlatui Lake, the next largest lake in the range, to the northwest of Thutade Lake, is at the head of the Firesteel River, a tributary of the Finlay. Various summits of the range, which as described separates the Pacific and Arctic drainages, form part of the Continental Divide. Most of the range and its lakes are in Tatlatui Provincial Park.

A number of rivers flow through the Tatlatui Range, including the Mosque River.
