= Thutade Lake =

Lake in British Columbia, Canada

- Location within British Columbia
- Location: British Columbia
- Coordinates: 56°53′N 127°00′W
- Primary inflows: Thutade Creek (Originating from Alma Peak, it is the most distant headwater of the Mackenzie River system)
- Primary outflows: Finlay River
- Basin countries: Canada
- Max. length: 40 km (25 mi)
- Max. width: 2 km (1.2 mi)
- Surface elevation: 1,200 metres (3,900 ft)

Thutade Lake is a natural alpine lake in the Omineca Mountains of the Northern Interior of British Columbia, Canada. About 40 km (25 mi) in length, but no more than about 2 km (1.2 mi) wide, the lake is at the head of the Finlay River, which joins the Peace River via Williston Lake. Thus the lake is primarily significant as the ultimate source of the Mackenzie River.

The area is very remote, being located about 260 km (160 mi) north of Smithers, although several mining operations for ores containing copper, lead, zinc and silver have occurred around the lake. The largest of these is the Kemess Mine, an iron and copper property originally owned by Royal Oak Mines and now by Northgate Minerals, located in the valley of Kemess Creek, which is off the northeast end of Thutade Lake. The mine is accessed by the Omineca Resource Road and other resource routes, and is 400 km (250 mi) by road from Prince George. Just downstream from the outlet of Thutade Lake, the Finlay plunges over the 180-foot (55 m) Cascadero Falls and then through a series of cataracts in a twisting course until it begins its main northeastward trend. Cascadero Falls is slated for hydroelectric development in connection with the power needs of the area's mines.

South and west of Thutade Lake lies the continental divide, across which is the watershed of the Mosque River, a tributary of the Skeena River.

== History ==
The first European to explore the lake and its surrounding area was Samuel Black in 1824. The upper end of the lake is the Tatlatui Range, which is astride the Continental Divide of the Americas, and which with the adjoining valley of Tatlatui Lake forms Tatlatui Provincial Park.

== See also ==
- List of lakes of British Columbia
