= El Nacional =

El Nacional may refer to:

== Newspapers ==
- El Nacional (Argentina), a newspaper in Argentina
- El Nacional (Catalonia), an online newspaper in Catalonia
- El Nacional (Bolivia), a newspaper in Bolivia
- El Nacional (Mexico), a newspaper in Mexico
- El Nacional (Paraguay), a newspaper in Paraguay
- El Nacional (Santo Domingo), a newspaper in the Dominican Republic
- El Nacional (Venezuela), a newspaper in Venezuela

== Other ==
- Club Deportivo El Nacional, an association football team in Ecuador

== See also ==
- Nacional (disambiguation)
