= Connelly Range =

Mountain range in British Columbia, Canada

- Location within British Columbia

Highest point
- Elevation: 1,626 m (5,335 ft)

Geography
- Country: Canada
- Province: British Columbia
- Range coordinates: 56°15′N 126°45′W
- Parent range: Hogem Ranges, Omineca Mountains

The Connelly Range is a subrange of the Hogem Ranges of the Omineca Mountains, located between Bear Lake and the headwaters of the Omineca River in northern British Columbia, Canada. As the Omineca is in the Arctic Ocean drainage and Bear Lake that of the Pacific, the range is part of the Continental Divide. It includes a group of volcanic plugs, the largest of which is The Thumb.

The range's named derived from that of Fort Connelly, a Hudson's Bay Company outpost founded by James Douglas, later Governor of Vancouver Island and British Columbia, during his tenure with the North West Company in New Caledonia, of which Fort Connelly was at the northwestern edge of. Sources vary as to where it was, either at the outlet of the Bear Lake (i.e. at its northern end) or on an island along the eastern shore near Tsaytut Bay. The name Fort Connelly today is associated with the settlement of Bear Lake.
