= Wrede Range =

Mountain range in British Columbia, Canada

Coordinates: 56°47′45″N 126°11′10″W

- Location within British Columbia

Highest point
- Elevation: 1,614 m (5,295 ft)

Dimensions
- Area: 420 km^{2} (160 mi^{2})

Geography
- Country: Canada
- Province: British Columbia
- Parent range: Swannell Ranges

The Wrede Range is a small subrange of the Swannell Ranges of the Omineca Mountains, located between Ingenika River and Wrede Creek in northern British Columbia, Canada.
