= Sustut Provincial Park and Protected Area =

Provincial park in British Columbia, Canada

- IUCN category Ib (wilderness area)
- Location within British Columbia
- Interactive map of Sustut Provincial Park and Protected Area
- Location: Stikine Region, British Columbia, Canada
- Coordinates: 56°23′00″N 126°40′00″W
- Area: 77,279 ha (298.38 sq mi)
- Established: January 25, 2001
- Governing body: BC Parks

Sustut Provincial Park and Protected Area is a provincial park in British Columbia, Canada, located on the east side of the Sustut River and above the Bear River. Established by order-in-council in 2001, the park has an area of 75,037 ha. The park protects the Hogem Ranges and the Connelly Range and is in the traditional territories of the Tsay Keh Dene First Nation and the Gitxsan First Nation.
