= Mitchell Range =

Mountain range in British Columbia, Canada

- Location within British Columbia

Highest point
- Elevation: 1,487 m (4,879 ft)

Geography
- Country: Canada
- Province: British Columbia
- Range coordinates: 55°19′59″N 125°31′59″W
- Parent range: Hogem Ranges
- Topo map: NTS 93N5 Takla Landing

The Mitchell Range is a subrange of the Hogem Ranges of the Omineca Mountains, bounded by Takla Lake and the Nation River in northern British Columbia, Canada.
