= Nation River =

Nation River may refer to:

- South Nation River in Ontario
- Petite-Nation River in Quebec
- Nation River (British Columbia), a river in the Peace River watershed in British Columbia
