= Fishing Range =

Mountain range in British Columbia, Canada

- Location within British Columbia

Highest point
- Elevation: 1,937 m (6,355 ft)

Geography
- Country: Canada
- Province: British Columbia
- Range coordinates: 57°30′N 126°25′W
- Parent range: Swannell Ranges

The Fishing Range is a subrange of the Swannell Ranges of the Omineca Mountains, located on the east side of Fishing Lakes and on the upper Finlay River in northern British Columbia, Canada.
