= Grand National (disambiguation) =

The Grand National is an English horse race.

Grand National may also refer to:

== Sports ==
- AMA Grand National Championship, a US motorcycle racing series
- Grand National (English greyhound race), an English greyhound race for hurdlers
- Grand National (Irish greyhound race), an Irish greyhound race for hurdlers
- Grand National Championships, a high school marching band competition hosted by Bands of America
- Grand National Handicap, a horse race run at Jerome Park Racetrack, New York, from 1866 to 1889
- Grand National Hurdle Stakes, an American horse race
- Grand National Rodeo, run by the California Department of Food and Agriculture in the Cow Palace
- Irish Grand National, an Irish horse race
- Scottish Grand National, a Scottish horse race
- The second name of NASCAR's Cup Series, which was known as the Grand National from 1950 to 1971
- NASCAR's second-tier series known as the Xfinity Series was once called the Busch Grand National series
- Welsh Grand National, a Welsh horse race

== Entertainment ==
- Grand National (album), a 2007 album by the John Butler Trio
- Grand National (band), British dance band from London
- Grand National, a 1983 computer game for ZX Spectrum published by CRL Group
- Grand National (video game), a 1985 computer game for ZX Spectrum published by Elite
- Grand National (roller coaster), a racing-themed roller coaster
- Grand National Pictures, a film production company
- Grand National Tour, a concert tour by Kendrick Lamar and SZA

== Other ==
- Grand National Party, a political party in South Korea
- Grand National Teams, American national bridge championship
- Grand National Consolidated Trades Union
- Buick Grand National, American coupe

== See also ==
- The National (disambiguation)
- National (disambiguation)
- Grand (disambiguation)
