= Atlético Nacional (disambiguation) =

Atlético Nacional or Atlético National S. A., is a Colombian professional football team based in Medellín, Colombia

Atlético Nacional can also refer to:

- Atlético Nacional (Honduras), Honduran football club based in Villanueva, Honduras
- Atletico Nacional (Panama), earlier Panamanian football team founded in 1995 and disbanded in 2001
- Atlético Nacional Emilio Alave, Bolivian football club based in Potosí, Potosí
- Sociedad Deportiva Atlético Nacional, or S.D. Atlético Nacional, Panamanian football team who currently play in the top tier Liga Panameña de Fútbol

== See also ==
- Club Nacional de Football, or C.N. de F., Uruguayan sports institution founded 1899 in Montevideo, as a result of the fusion between Uruguay Athletic Club and Montevideo Fútbol Club. Although its main focus is football, the club hosts many other activities including basketball, futsal, tennis, cycling, volleyball, and chess.
- Nacional (disambiguation) § Sports, disambiguation of many clubs carrying the name Nacional
