= Osilinka Ranges =

Mountain range in British Columbia, Canada

- Location within British Columbia

Highest point
- Elevation: 1,850 m (6,070 ft)

Dimensions
- Area: 1,757 km^{2} (678 mi^{2})

Geography
- Country: Canada
- Province: British Columbia
- Range coordinates: 56°15′N 125°41′W
- Parent range: Swannell Ranges

The Osilinka Ranges are a small subrange of the Swannell Ranges of the Omineca Mountains, located between Osilinka River and Lay Creek in northern British Columbia, Canada.
