= Omineca Cablevision =

- Company type: Company
- Industry: Media and Communications
- Headquarters: Vanderhoof, British Columbia
- Products: Cable TV, Internet, Telecommunications, Broadcasting
- Parent: YourLink
- Website: omineca.com

Omineca Cablevision was a cable television and internet service provider in Omineca Country, near Prince George, British Columbia. The company served the communities of Vanderhoof, Fraser Lake, and Burns Lake. The company takes its name from Omineca Country and the Omineca Mountains in the area. Omineca offered cable television and internet access in the area. The company was a division of YourLink Inc., and was sold in October 2016 as part of Telus's purchase of YourLink's BC operations.
