= Germansen Range =

Mountain range in British Columbia, Canada

- Location within British Columbia

Highest point
- Elevation: 1,644 m (5,394 ft)

Geography
- Country: Canada
- Province: British Columbia
- Range coordinates: 55°37′N 124°53′W
- Parent range: Swannell Ranges (Omineca Mountains)

The Germansen Range is a small subrange of the Swannell Ranges of the Omineca Mountains, bounded by Germansen Lake and South Germansen River northern British Columbia, Canada.

== See also ==
- Germansen River
- Germansen Landing
