= Tucha Range =

Mountain range in British Columbia, Canada

- Location within British Columbia

Highest point
- Elevation: 1,601 m (5,253 ft)

Dimensions
- Area: 527 km^{2} (203 mi^{2})

Geography
- Country: Canada
- Province: British Columbia
- Range coordinates: 56°53′N 125°53′W
- Parent range: Swannell Ranges

The Tucha Range is a small subrange of the Swannell Ranges of the Omineca Mountains, located north of Ingenika River and south of Tucha Creek in northern British Columbia, Canada.
