= Slate Creek (British Columbia) =

Coordinates: 55°40′11″N 124°29′05″W

Slate Creek is a creek located in the Omineca Country region of British Columbia. This creek is a tributary of the Manson River and flows into that river from the west. Slate Creek was discovered in 1871. The creek has been mined using wing-damming and hand-mining.
