= Bear Lake (Fort Connelly) =

- Unincorporated place
- Location of Bear Lake in British Columbia
- Coordinates: 56°12′00″N 126°51′00″W
- Country: Canada
- Province: British Columbia
- Elevation: 794 m (2,604 ft)

Bear Lake, formerly known as Fort Connelly or Fort Connolly, or Connolly's Lake, is an unincorporated settlement located on the northeast side of the lake of the same name, which lies to the north of Babine Lake and Takla Lake in the northwestern end of the Omineca Country in the North-Central Interior of British Columbia, Canada. At the same location is Takla Lake First Nation's Bear Lake Indian Reserve No. 4.

== History ==
Fort Connelly, also spelled Fort Connolly was founded in 1826 by James Douglas as a fur trade post in the New Caledonia fur district of the Hudson's Bay Company, and was named by him in honour of his father-in-law, William Connolly. Along with the posts of Fort Babine and Fort Chilcotin, Fort Connelly was established in accordance with the HBC's decision to extend New Caledonia's trade northward and westward in an attempt to intercept or stem the flow of furs from the interior to the coast, where American maritime fur traders bought them at high prices. The HBC post (also called Connelly, Connolly Lake, Fort Connolly, Bear Lake, and Little Bear Lake) was abandoned in 1878 due to the little trade. In 1887, it was reopened but closed permanently in the summer of 1892.

The Connelly Range in the same area was named for the fort, which may not have been at the location of the present-day settlement, but may have been either at the north end of the lake, or on an island in Tsaytut Bay. Nothing remains of the original fort, except its name which was applied to this settlement on April 23, 1940 as "Bear Lake (Fort Connelly)", a designation which lasted until November 2, 1964 when it was simplified to "Bear Lake (Settlement)"; it has since been further re-designated as "Bear Lake (Community)".
