= Manson River =

Coordinates: 55°43′N 123°53′W

Manson River is a river located in the Omineca Country region of British Columbia. It flows north into Manson Arm, Williston Lake. The river is located south of Germansen Landing. It was first known as Manson Creek and was discovered in 1871 by Robert Howell. The river has been mined using wing-damming, drifting and hydraulicking. Manson River has been mined by Europeans and Chinese.

== See also ==
- List of rivers of British Columbia
