= Kwanika Range =

Mountain range in British Columbia, Canada

- Location within British Columbia

Highest point
- Elevation: 899 m (2,949 ft)

Geography
- Country: Canada
- Province: British Columbia
- Range coordinates: 55°28′N 125°08′W
- Parent range: Swannell Ranges

The Kwanika Range is a small subrange of the Swannell Ranges of the Omineca Mountains, bounded by Kwanika Creek, Klawli River and Nation River in northern British Columbia, Canada.
