= The National =

The National may refer to:

== Arts and entertainment ==
- The National (art exhibition), a biennial exhibition of contemporary Australian art held by several museums in Sydney
- The National (band), an American indie rock band
  - The National (album), an album by the band of the same name

== Buildings ==
- The National (theater), a historic theater in Virginia, US
- The National, Chicago, a high-rise building in Chicago

== News media ==
- The National (TV program), a Canadian Broadcasting Corporation television news program
- The National (Abu Dhabi), a newspaper published in the United Arab Emirates
- The National (Papua New Guinea), a newspaper in Papua New Guinea
- The National (Scotland), a newspaper in Scotland
- The National (Wales), a defunct newspaper in Wales
- The National (Paris), a defunct French newspaper
- The National Sports Daily, a defunct U.S. sports newspaper

== Sports ==
- The National (curling), a curling tournament
- The National (golf), a golf tournament
- National Football Scouting, an NFL scouting organization
- National Golf Links of America, a golf course in Southampton, New York

== See also ==
- Grand National (disambiguation)
- Le National (disambiguation)
- National (disambiguation)
- The Nation (disambiguation)
