= Russel Range =

Mountain range

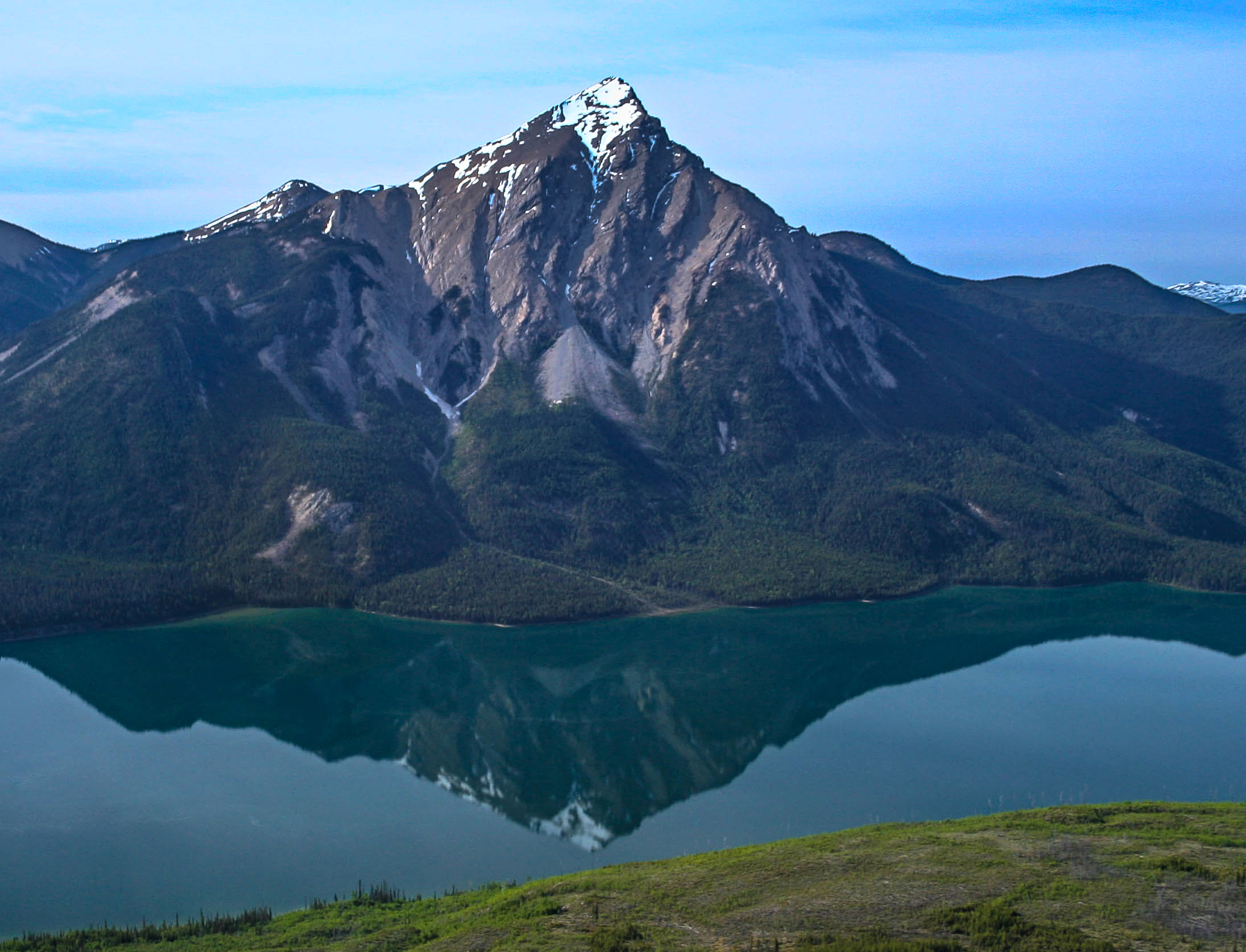
- Pelly Peak overlooking Pelly Lake

Highest point
- Elevation: 1,621 m (5,318 ft)
- Coordinates: 57°10′N 125°50′W

Geography
- Location within British Columbia
- Country: Canada
- Province: British Columbia
- Parent range: Finlay Ranges

The Russel Range is a subrange of the Finlay Ranges of the Omineca Mountains, located between Finlay River and Pelly Creek in northern British Columbia, Canada.

Geologist R.G. McConnell named Russel Range after his assistant, H. Y. Russel.
