= Lay Range =

Mountain range in British Columbia, Canada

- Location within British Columbia

Highest point
- Elevation: 1,531 m (5,023 ft)
- Coordinates: 56°31′N 125°45′W

Geography
- Country: Canada
- Province: British Columbia
- Parent range: Swannell Ranges

The Lay Range is a small subrange of the Swannell Ranges of the Omineca Mountains, located between Lay Creek and Swannell River in northern British Columbia, Canada.
