= Axelgold Range =

Mountain range in British Columbia, Canada

- Location within British Columbia

Highest point
- Elevation: 1,635 m (5,364 ft)

Geography
- Country: Canada
- Province: British Columbia
- Range coordinates: 56°02′N 126°05′W
- Parent range: Hogem Ranges

The Axelgold Range is a subrange of the Hogem Ranges of the Omineca Mountains, located between Ominicetla Creek and upper Omineca River in northern British Columbia, Canada.
