= Kemess Mine =

Mine in British Columbia, Canada

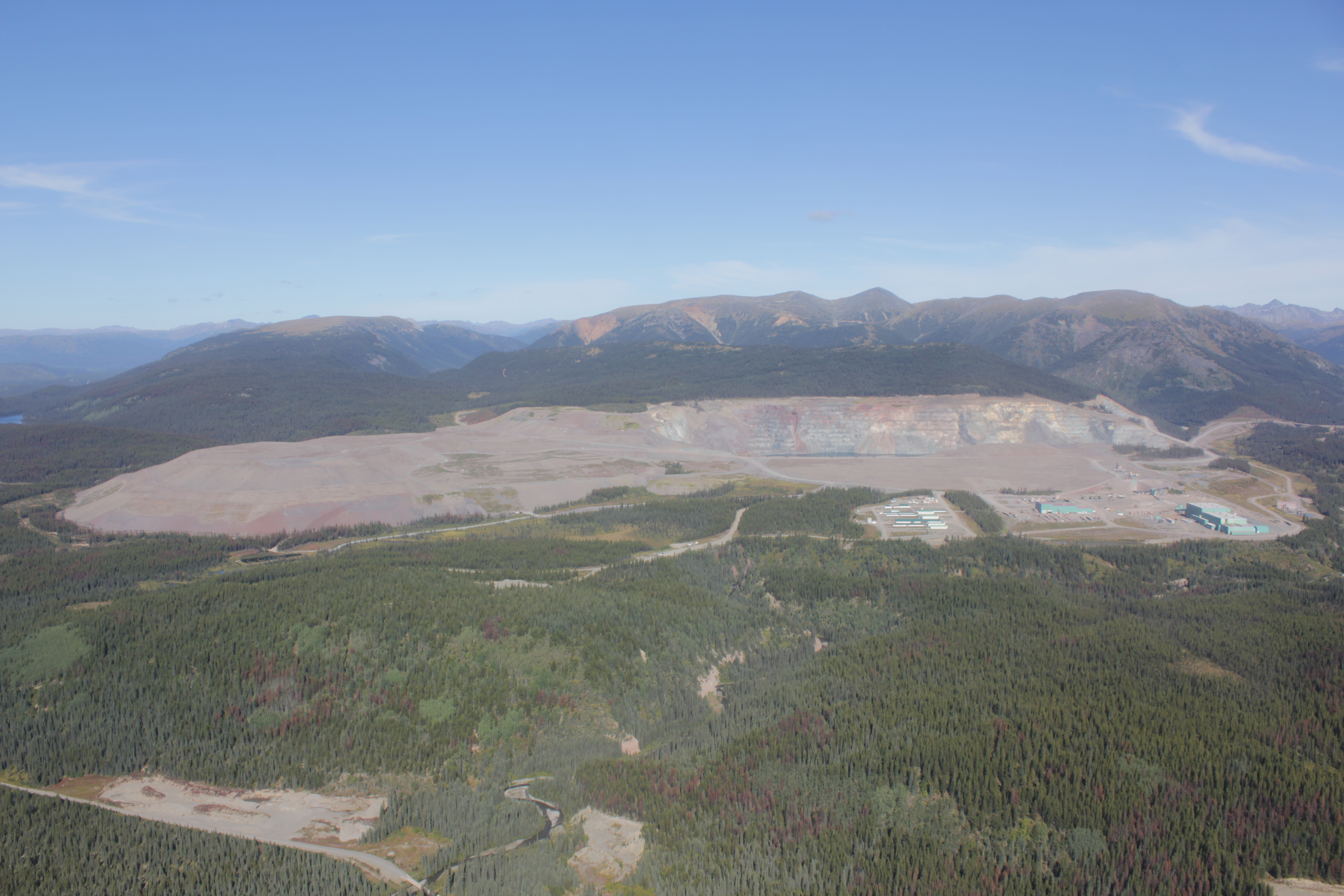
- Kemess Mine in 2012

- Location in Canada
- Location: Thutade Lake, British Columbia, Canada; 57°0′17″N 126°45′31″W
- Products: Copper, Gold,
- Opened: 1998
- Closed: 2011
- Company: Centerra Gold
- Acquired: 2018

The Kemess Mine was an open-pit copper and gold mine, located just northeast of the foot of Thutade Lake, at the head of the Finlay River, in the Omineca Mountains of the Northern Interior of British Columbia, Canada. It was operated by Royal Oak Mines from 1998 to 1999, when it was bought by Northgate Minerals. Northgate operated the mine until its closure in 2011; that year Northgate was taken over by AuRico Gold. In 2014 AuRico Gold partitioned off its portion of Kemess Mine ownership creating a new company called AuRico Metals.

AuRico Metals was acquired by Centerra Gold in January 2018.

The deposit mined was a copper-gold porphyry. Over its life the mine produced approximately 3 million ounces of gold and 800 million pounds of copper.

The mine is serviced by Kemess Creek Airport and the Omineca Resource Road from Prince George. Air distance from Smithers is 280 km, approximately due north; road distance from Prince George is approximately 550 km.

Near the mine is the Kemess Underground Project, also owned by Centerra Gold. This separate deposit is currently in the development stage, and has not been approved for production.
