= National =

National or Nationals may refer to:

== Places in the United States ==
- National, Maryland, a census-designated place
- National, Nevada, a ghost town
- National, Utah, a ghost town
- National, West Virginia, an unincorporated community

== Commerce ==
- National (brand), a brand name of electronic goods from Panasonic
- National Benzole (or simply National), former petrol station chain in the UK, merged with BP
- National Book Store, a bookstore and office supplies chain in the Philippines
- National Car Rental, an American rental car company
- National Energy Systems, a former name of Eco Marine Power
- National Entertainment Commission, a former name of the Media Rating Council
- National Motor Vehicle Company, Indianapolis, Indiana, United States (1900–1924)
- National Radio Company, Malden, Massachusetts, United States (1914–1991)
- National Supermarkets, a defunct American grocery store chain
- National String Instrument Corporation, a guitar company formed to manufacture the first resonator guitars
  - Their successor companies:
    - National Dobro Corporation
    - National Reso-Phonic Guitars

== Sports ==
- Washington Nationals (disambiguation), various baseball teams
  - Washington Nationals, a Major League Baseball team based in Washington, DC
- Fredericksburg Nationals, a minor league baseball team in Fredericksburg, Virginia
- Montreal Le National or Montreal Nationals, a Canadian senior-level men's hockey team from 1895 to 1926
- Montreal Nationals, a Canadian team in the Ontario Rugby Football Union in 1938
  - CNR Nationals, a Canadian team in the Quebec Rugby Football Union in 1937; see above article
- Potomac Nationals, a former minor league baseball team in Woodbridge, Virginia
- Syracuse Nationals, a 1946-1963 professional basketball team
- Championnat National, also known as National, a French football league competition
- National (curling), an annual curling bonspiel
- SK Nationalkameratene, a Norwegian sports club
- TIL National, a Norwegian sports club
- The Nationals (eSports), an eSports league based in the Philippines

== Other uses ==
- National Party (disambiguation)
- "Nationals" (Glee), an episode of Glee
- The National (band), an indy band from Ohio

== See also ==
- Le National (disambiguation), various newspapers and a television program
- The National (disambiguation)
- Nacional (disambiguation)
- Young Nationals (disambiguation)
