= Wolverine Range =

Mountain range in British Columbia, Canada

- Location within British Columbia

Highest point
- Elevation: 1,482 m (4,862 ft)
- Coordinates: 55°46′00″N 124°19′00″W

Dimensions
- Area: 2,492 km^{2} (962 mi^{2})

Geography
- Country: Canada
- Province: British Columbia
- Parent range: Swannell Ranges

The Wolverine Range is a small subrange of the Swannell Ranges of the Omineca Mountains, located west of Williston Lake and south of Omineca Arm in northern British Columbia, Canada.
