= Nationality (disambiguation) =

Nationality is a legal affiliation with a state.

Nationality may also refer to:

- Multiple nationality, legal affiliation with more than one civic nationality, or citizenship
- Nationality law, law that regulates issues related to civic nationality, or citizenship
- Ethnic nationality, affiliation with an ethnic group, through the concept of an ethnic nation
  - Nationality in ethnopolitics, affiliation of an ethnic nationality with a particular ethnopolitical program
- Nationality in religious nationalism, a specific concept of nationality, in religious nationalism

== See also ==
- Nation (disambiguation)
