= Bear Lake (Bear River) =

Lake in British Columbia, Canada

- Location within British Columbia
- Location: North-Central Interior British Columbia
- Coordinates: 56°06′N 126°49′W
- Primary outflows: Bear River
- Basin countries: Canada
- Settlements: Bear Lake

Bear Lake is a large lake in the northwestern Omineca Country of the North-Central Interior of British Columbia, Canada, located north of Babine and Takla Lakes. Takla Lake, is part of the Fraser River drainage, while Bear Lake, like Babine Lake, is a tributary to the Skeena River via the Bear River, which runs from its northern end. The community of Bear Lake, also known as Fort Connelly, is located on the lake's northeast side. The original Fort Connelly may have been, however, at the lake's northern end or on an island in Tsaytut Bay.

== See also ==
- List of lakes of British Columbia
