= Nacional Atlético Clube =

Nacional Atlético Clube may refer to:

- Nacional Atlético Clube (SP), Brazilian football club from São Paulo
- Nacional Atlético Clube (MG), Brazilian football club from Muriaé, Minas Gerais, (not to be confused with other Minas Gerais football club named "Nacional")
- Nacional Atlético Clube (Cabedelo), Brazilian football club from Cabedelo, Paraíba
- Nacional Atlético Clube (Patos), Brazilian football club from Patos, Paraíba
- Nacional Atlético Clube Sociedade Civil Ltda., Brazilian football club from Rolândia

== See also ==
- Atlético Nacional, a Colombian professional football team based in Medellín
- Nacional (disambiguation), for other football clubs named Nacional
