= Lost Creek (British Columbia) =

Coordinates: 55°39′58″N 124°27′35″W

Lost Creek is a creek located in the Omineca Country region of British Columbia. The creek flows into the Manson River from the south and was discovered in 1871. Lost Creek has been mined by Europeans and Chinese miners.
