= McConnell Range =

Mountain range in British Columbia, Canada

- Location within British Columbia

Highest point
- Elevation: 1,903 m (6,243 ft)

Dimensions
- Area: 387 km^{2} (149 mi^{2})

Geography
- Country: Canada
- Province: British Columbia
- Range coordinates: 56°48′N 126°35′W
- Parent range: Swannell Ranges

The McConnell Range is a small subrange of the Swannell Ranges of the Omineca Mountains, located east of Moose Valley and west of McConnell Creek in northern British Columbia, Canada.
