= Ospika River =

Coordinates: 56°19′00″N 123°57′00″W

The Ospika River is a river in the Northern Interior of British Columbia, Canada, rising in the Northern Rocky Mountains to the north of Lake Williston and flowing south to join that lake in the lower end of its Finlay Reach. Before the creation of that lake by the building of WAC Bennett Dam, it was a tributary of the Finlay River.

== See also ==
- List of rivers of British Columbia
