= Butler Range (Canada) =

Mountain range in British Columbia, Canada

- Location within British Columbia

Geography
- Country: Canada
- Province: British Columbia
- Range coordinates: 56°27′N 124°45′W
- Parent range: Finlay Ranges

The Butler Range is a subrange of the Finlay Ranges of the Omineca Mountains, located on the west side of Finlay Reach in northern British Columbia, Canada.

Butler Range was named for Captain W.F. Butler who ascended the Peace Range in 1872.
