= Sitlika Range =

Mountain range in British Columbia, Canada

- Location within British Columbia

Geography
- Country: Canada
- Province: British Columbia
- Range coordinates: 55°46′30″N 125°58′10″W
- Parent range: Hogem Ranges

The Sitlika Range is a subrange of the Hogem Ranges of the Omineca Mountains, bounded by both the Fall River and Ogden Creek in northern British Columbia, Canada.
