= Sikanni Range =

Mountain range in British Columbia, Canada

Coordinates: 56°15′00″N 126°25′00″W

The Sikanni Range is a subrange of the Omineca Mountains in the Northern Interior of British Columbia, located between the Omineca and Atsika Rivers.

== See also ==
- Sikanni (disambiguation)
- Sekani
