= Espee Range =

Mountain range in British Columbia, Canada

- Location within British Columbia

Highest point
- Elevation: 1,686 m (5,531 ft)

Geography
- Country: Canada
- Province: British Columbia
- Range coordinates: 56°57′30″N 125°43′0″W
- Parent range: Swannell Ranges

The Espee Range is a subrange of the Swannell Ranges of the Omineca Mountains, located between Pelly Creek and Tucha Creek in northern British Columbia, Canada.
