= Vital Range =

Canadian mountain range

- Location within British Columbia

Geography
- Country: Canada
- Province: British Columbia
- Range coordinates: 55°40′05″N 125°44′0″W
- Parent range: Hogem Ranges

The Vital Range is a subrange of the Hogem Ranges of the Omineca Mountains, bounded by Fall Creek, Silver Creek and Kenny Creek in northern British Columbia, Canada.
