= Sikanni Chief Lake =

Lake in British Columbia, Canada

- Location within British Columbia
- Location: Northern Rocky Mountains, British Columbia
- Coordinates: 57°16′00″N 124°08′00″W
- Basin countries: Canada

Sikanni Chief Lake is a lake at the headwaters of the Sikanni Chief River in the Northern Rocky Mountains region of British Columbia, Canada.

== See also ==
- List of lakes of British Columbia
- Sikanni (disambiguation)
- Sekani
