= Sikanni =

Sikanni is a variant spelling of Sekani, the name of an Athapaskan people of northern British Columbia, Canada. It is found in various placenames and related uses:

- Sikanni Chief, British Columbia, an unincorporated settlement in British Columbia
- Sikanni Chief River, a tributary of the Fort Nelson River in British Columbia
- Sikanni Chief Lake, a lake near the headwaters of that river
- Sikanni Old Growth Provincial Park, a provincial park in British Columbia
- the Sikanni Range, a subrange of the Omineca Mountains of British Columbia
- CFAV Sikanni (YPT 611), a torpedo and sound ranging vessel of the Canadian Forces, named after the river
