= Hogem Ranges =

Mountain range in British Columbia, Canada

- Location within British Columbia

Highest point
- Elevation: 1,075 m (3,527 ft)
- Coordinates: 55°50′00″N 126°00′00″W

Geography
- Country: Canada
- Region: British Columbia
- Parent range: Omineca Mountains

The Hogem Ranges are a group of mountain ranges in the northwest part of the Omineca Country of the North-Central Interior of British Columbia, Canada, located between Takla Lake (W) and the Omineca River (E) and from the Nation Lakes (SE) to the Sustut River (NW). The ranges have a collective area of 8868 km^{2} and is a subgrouping of the Omineca Mountains which in turn form part of the Interior Mountains.

Rivers of the Hogem Ranges include the Sustut River and Mosque River.

== Sub-ranges ==
- Axelgold Range
- Cariboo Heart Range
- Connelly Range
- Mitchell Range
- Sikanni Range
- Sitlika Range
- Vital Range
