= John Finlay (fur trader) =

John Finlay (c. 1774 – December 19, 1833) was a fur trader and explorer with the North West Company. He is best remembered for establishing the first fur trading post in what is now British Columbia, Canada and for his exploration of the Finlay River, one of the two major rivers forming the Peace River.

Finlay was born in Montreal, the son of James Finlay, who himself was a significant player in the western Canadian fur trade. Finlay was apprenticed as a clerk in the North West Company in 1789 at the age of 15. He accompanied Alexander Mackenzie on his historic trip across the Rocky Mountains to the Pacific Ocean in 1792-93 becoming, with him, the first European to traverse North America. He was placed in charge of the North West Company's Athabasca Department in 1794, and the same year established a trading post at present-day Fort St. John, called Rocky Mountain Fort. This was the first European community established in present-day British Columbia and is the province's oldest continuously inhabited European-founded settlement.

In 1797, Finlay revisited Mackenzie's excursion to the Pacific, with a view to taking the north branch of the Peace rather than the southern branch (the Parsnip River) taken by Mackenzie. This northern branch would come to be known as the Finlay River. Finlay perhaps thought that this route might present a less complicated conduit to the Pacific. No record remains of the expedition except in the writings of Samuel Black, who ascended to the source of the Finlay in 1824, noting that "he had studied Finlay’s chart." Nonetheless, it would appear from the information Black had that Finlay had only made it as far as the Ingenika River, about 130 km north of the Finlay River's confluence with the Peace. Indeed, Black's journal makes clear that the northern branch, far from being less complicated, was all but impassable in many parts, perhaps explaining Finlay's reluctance to travel more than about one-quarter of the river's actual length.

Finlay remained in the North West Company's Athabasca Department, becoming a partner of the company in 1799. He retired from the fur trade in 1804 and returned to Montreal. Little is known of his life there, except that he obtained an appointment as deputy commissary-general.
