= Cariboo Heart Range =

Mountain range in British Columbia, Canada

- Location within British Columbia

Highest point
- Elevation: 1,416 m (4,646 ft)

Geography
- Country: Canada
- Province: British Columbia
- Range coordinates: 56°03′N 126°15′W
- Parent range: Hogem Ranges

The Cariboo Heart Range is a subrange of the Hogem Ranges of the Omineca Mountains, located between Ominicetla Creek and Lion Creek in northern British Columbia, Canada.
