= Ingenika Range =

Mountain range in British Columbia, Canada

- Location within British Columbia

Highest point
- Elevation: 1,859 m (6,099 ft)

Geography
- Country: Canada
- Province: British Columbia
- Range coordinates: 56°41′0″N 125°42′40″W
- Parent range: Swannell Ranges

The Ingenika Range is a small subrange of the Swannell Ranges of the Omineca Mountains, located south of Ingenika River above Swannell River in northern British Columbia, Canada.
