= Nation (surname) =

Nation or Nations is a surname. Notable people with the surname include:

- Bill Nation (1925–2022), American politician
- Bill Nations (1942–2025), American dentist and politician in Oklahoma
- Carrie Nation (1846–1911), American activist
- Cynthia Nations, American politician
- Gilbert Nations, American lawyer
- Greggory Nations, American screenwriter
- James Nation (born 1976), New Zealand field hockey player
- James Nation (born 1985), American attorney
- Paul Nation (born 1944), American-New Zealander lexicologist
- Terry Nation (1930–1997), British screenwriter
- Harold Turton Nation (1876–1967), assistant provincial mineralogist, namesake of Nation Peak, British Columbia
- Opal Louis Nations (born 1941), British-American-Canadian musician
