= Omineca Mountains =

Group of mountain ranges in British Columbia, Canada

- The Ominecas
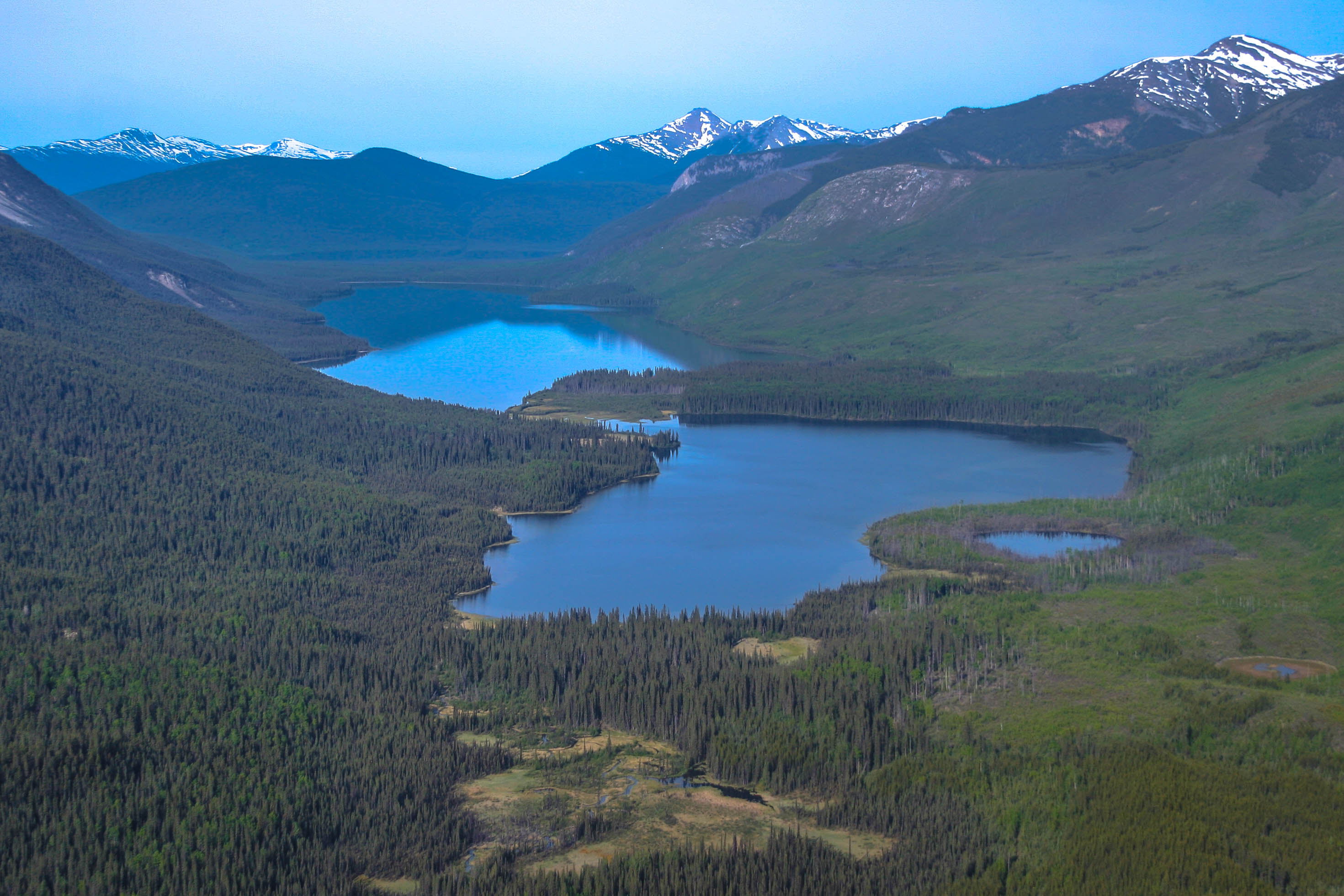
- The Ingenika, Tucha, and Russel ranges overlooking Pelly Lake

Highest point
- Elevation: 2,400 m (7,900 ft)

Dimensions
- Area: 47,901 km^{2} (18,495 mi^{2})

Geography
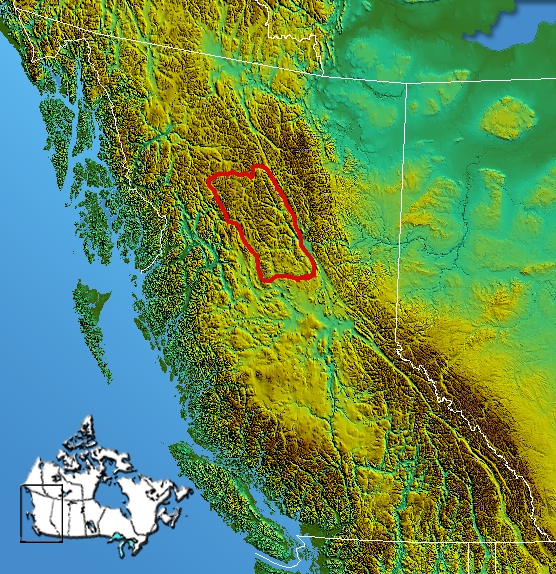
- Location map of the Omineca Mountains
- Country: Canada
- Region: British Columbia
- Range coordinates: 56°30.0′N 125°30.2′W
- Parent range: Interior Mountains

The Omineca Mountains, also known as "the Ominecas", are a group of remote mountain ranges in the Boreal Cordillera of north-central British Columbia, Canada. They are bounded by the Finlay River on the north, the Rocky Mountain Trench (here filled by Williston Lake) on the east, the Nation Lakes on the south, and the upper reaches of the Omineca River on the west. They form a section of the Continental Divide, that, in this region, separates water drainage between the Arctic and Pacific Oceans. The lower course of the Omineca River flows through the heart of the range. To the south of the Ominecas is the Nechako Plateau, to the west the Skeena Mountains and Hazelton Mountains, to the north the Spatsizi Plateau and the Stikine Ranges, while east across the Rocky Mountain Trench are the Muskwa Ranges.

"The Omineca" or "the Omineca Country" is the entire area plus some of the northern Nechako Plateau adjacent to the Ominecas, where there has been more settlement and, in the past, extensive gold-mining exploration and prospecting (in the same period as the Omineca, Fraser Canyon and Cariboo Gold Rushes, i.e. 1860s).

== Sub-ranges ==
- Finlay Ranges
  - Butler Range
  - Russel Range
- Hogem Ranges
  - Axelgold Range
  - Cariboo Heart Range
  - Connelly Range
  - Mitchell Range
  - Sikanni Range
  - Sitlika Range
  - Vital Range
- Metsantan Range
- Samuel Black Range
- Swannell Ranges
  - Espee Range
  - Fishing Range
  - Germansen Range
  - Ingenika Range
  - Kwanika Range
  - Kwun Yótasi Range
  - Lay Range
  - McConnell Range
  - Osilinka Ranges
  - Peak Range
  - Tenakihi Range
  - Tucha Range
  - Wolverine Range
  - Wrede Range
- Tatlatui Range

== Rivers ==
- Finlay River
- Firesteel River
- Germansen River
- Mosque River
- Omineca River
- Toodoggone River

== See also ==
- Omineca Country
- Omineca Gold Rush
- Omineca Cablevision
- Prince George-Omineca
- Omineca (electoral district)
