= El Nacional (Bolivia) =

Bolivian newspaper

El Nacional is a newspaper published in Tarija, Bolivia.
