= Nacional =

Nacional, the Portuguese and Spanish word for "national", may refer to:

== Airlines ==
- Nacional Transportes Aéreos, a Brazilian airline defunct in 2002
- Transportes Aéreos Nacional, a Brazilian airline defunct in 1961

== Bank ==
- Banco Nacional, a former Brazilian bank

== Music ==
- Discos Nacional (Nacional-Glücksmann, later Nacional-Odeon), an Argentine record label run by Max Glücksmann
- Nacional Records, a record label

== Mass media ==
- Nacional (newspaper), a defunct Serbian daily newspaper published 2001–2003
- Nacional (weekly), a Croatian weekly magazine
- TV Nacional, a defunct television station in Brasília, Brazil

== Sports ==
- Clube Desportivo Nacional popularly known as "Nacional da Madeira", a football club from Madeira, Portugal
- Club Nacional de Football, from Montevideo, Uruguay
- Atlético Nacional, the football club from Medellín, Colombia
- Club Deportivo El Nacional, a football club from Quito, the capital of Ecuador
- Club Nacional, a Paraguayan football club
- Nacional de Guadalajara, a football club from Guadalajara, Mexico
- Nacional Fast Clube, a Brazilian football club
- Nacional Futebol Clube, a Brazilian football club
- Nacional Futebol Clube (MG), a Brazilian football club from Uberaba, Minas Gerais
- Nacional Atlético Clube (MG), a Brazilian football club
- Nacional Atlético Clube (SP), a Brazilian football club
- Nacional Atlético Clube Sociedade Civil Ltda., a Brazilian football club
- Nacional Atlético Clube (Cabedelo), a Brazilian football club
- Nacional Atlético Clube (Patos), a Brazilian football club
- Nacional Esporte Clube (MG), a Brazilian football club from Nova Serrana
- Esporte Clube Nacional, a Brazilian football club
- Sociedade Esportiva Nacional, a Brazilian football club
- S.D. Atlético Nacional, a Panamanian second-tier football club
- F.C. Nacional, a Croatian futsal club
- FCS Nacional, a Surinamese football club
- Nacional championship, one of the tournaments in Primera División Argentina from 1967 to 1985

== Other uses ==
- Nacional (cocoa bean)

== See also ==
- National (disambiguation)
- Nacional Atlético Clube (disambiguation)
- El Nacional (disambiguation)
