= Finlay Ranges =

Mountain range in northern British Columbia, Canada

- Location within British Columbia

Geography
- Country: Canada
- Region: British Columbia
- Range coordinates: 56°20′30″N 124°38′30″W
- Parent range: Omineca Mountains

The Finlay Ranges are a mountain range in northern British Columbia, Canada. It has an area of 4818 km^{2} and is a subrange of the Omineca Mountains which in turn form part of the Interior Mountains.

== Sub-ranges ==
- Butler Range
- Russel Range

== See also ==
- Interior Mountains
