= Nation Peak =

Mountain in British Columbia, Canada

Coordinates: 57°39′01″N 128°55′19″W

Nation Peak, 2376 m / 7795 ft, prominence 806 m, is the second-highest mountain summit on the Spatsizi Plateau in northwestern British Columbia, Canada. It is southeast from the community of Telegraph Creek and is just west of Cold Fish Lake.

== Name origin ==
The peak was named for an assistant to the provincial mineralogist, Harold Turton Nation, born at Dunedin, New Zealand in 1876. He arrived in British Columbia in 1897 and joined the BC Department of Mines in 1906, serving with them for over 30 years. In 1912, prepared maps of the area between Telegraph Creek and Hazelton after travelling that area. Nation travelled all over the province, preparing maps and reports on many previously-unexplored areas.

== See also ==
- Nation Mountain
- Nation (disambiguation)
