= National, Nevada =

- Ghost town
- Location within Nevada Location within the United States
- Country: United States
- State: Nevada
- County: Humboldt
- Named for: Humboldt National Forest
- Elevation: 6,100 ft (1,860 m)

National is an extinct town in Humboldt County, in the United States state of Nevada.

== History ==
There are at least two stories about why the place is named "National". The Works Progress Administration states that the original town site was within the borders of Humboldt National Forest, hence the name. Paher and Carlson state that the name came from the National brand automobile that was driven by J. L. Workman, who discovered the mining district in 1907.

A post office was established at National in 1908, and remained in operation until 1919.

In 1911–1912, addition to a post office, National had a two-story hotel, stores, saloons, a weekly newspaper (The Miner), a dentist and a doctor.

By 1915, the town was greatly diminished.
