= Firesteel River (British Columbia) =

River in British Columbia, Canada

Coordinates: 57°08′00″N 126°55′00″W

The Firesteel River is the uppermost left tributary of the Finlay River in the Northern Interior of British Columbia, Canada. The river originates at Tatlatui Lake, while the Finlay originates at the outlet of Thutade Lake, to the southeast, which is considered the ultimate source of the Mackenzie River.

== See also ==
- Tatlatui Range
- Tatlatui Provincial Park
- List of rivers of British Columbia
