= The Nation (disambiguation) =

The Nation is an American magazine founded in 1865.

The Nation may also refer to:

== Newspapers ==
- The Nation (Irish newspaper), a former Irish nationalist newspaper founded in the 1840s
- The Nation (Malawi), a daily paper print and online from Malawi
- The Nation (Nigeria), a Nigerian newspaper
- The Nation (Pakistan), an English-language newspaper in Pakistan
- The Nation (Sri Lanka), an English-language weekly newspaper in Sri Lanka
- The Nation (Thailand), an English-language newspaper in Thailand
- The Nation and Athenaeum, a former weekly paper in the UK, merged into the New Statesman in 1931
- The Nation Barbados, a daily newspaper established in 1973

== Other uses ==
- The Nation (TV series), an Australian comedy series
- The Nation with David Speers, a defunct Australian news program
- The Nation, Ontario, Canada, a municipality

== See also ==
- Nation (disambiguation)
