= Muscovite Lakes Provincial Park =

Provincial park in British Columbia, Canada

- IUCN category II (national park)
- Location within British Columbia
- Interactive map of Muscovite Lakes Provincial Park
- Location: British Columbia, Canada
- Nearest city: Mackenzie
- Coordinates: 55°58′39″N 124°08′44″W
- Area: 57.08 km^{2} (22.04 sq mi)
- Established: April 11, 2001
- Governing body: BC Parks

Muscovite Lakes Provincial Park is a provincial park in British Columbia, Canada. It is located on the western shore of Lake Williston, about 125 kilometres (78 mi) north of Mackenzie.
