= Silver Creek (Omineca River tributary) =

Watercourse in British Columbia, Canada

Coordinates: 55°45′28″N 125°25′14″W

Silver Creek is a creek located in the Omineca Country region of British Columbia. The creek flows from the south into the Omineca River approximately 35 miles west of Germansen Landing. The creek was discovered by Byrnes' "Peace River Prospecting Party" in 1869. Gold and silver have been recovered from the creek. The creek has been mined by Europeans and Chinese Miners.
