= Sustut River =

The Sustut River is a major tributary of the Skeena River in the north-central Interior of British Columbia, Canada. It forms the northwest boundary of the Hogem Ranges and flows southwest to meet the Skeena, north of Hazelton. Originally named the Bear Wallow River, its headwaters are at Sustut Lake, northwest of Germansen Landing (at 56°35′N 126°27′W; Sustut Lake was similarly named Bear Wallow Lake).

== See also ==
- List of rivers of British Columbia
- Sustut Provincial Park
