= Tatlatui Provincial Park =

Provincial park in British Columbia, Canada

- IUCN category Ib (wilderness area)
- Location within British Columbia
- Interactive map of Tatlatui Provincial Park
- Location: Peace River RD, British Columbia, Canada
- Coordinates: 56°58′00″N 127°23′00″W
- Area: 105,829 ha (408.61 sq mi)
- Established: May 18, 1973
- Governing body: BC Parks

Tatlatui Provincial Park is a provincial park in British Columbia, Canada, located at the southern end of the Spatsizi Plateau and around the headwaters of the Firesteel River, part of the Finlay-Peace River basin and therefore in the Arctic drainage. Thutade Lake, at the head of the Firesteel and to the southeast of the park, is considered the ultimate source of the Mackenzie River (via the Finlay and Peace Rivers).
