= Lay Creek =

Stream in Colorado, U.S.

Coordinates: 40°29′45″N 108°00′52″W

Lay Creek is a stream in the U.S. state of Colorado.

Some say Lay Creek has the name of a pioneer settler named Lay, while others believe the creek took its name from the nearby military command known as Camp Lay.

== See also ==
- List of rivers of Colorado
