= Bear River (Sustut River tributary) =

River in Canada

Coordinates: 56°17′00″N 126°58′00″W

The Bear River is a river in northwestern British Columbia, Canada. It flows northwest into the Sustut River, which flows southwest into the upper Skeena River.

== See also ==
- List of rivers of British Columbia
