= Le National =

Le National may refer to:

== Newspapers ==
- Le National (Paris), France, 1830–1851
- Le National (Québec), Canada
- Le National (Abidjan), Côte d'Ivoire
- Le National (Port-au-Prince), Haiti, weekly 1953–
- Le National (Lubumbashi), Democratic Republic of the Congo, weekly 1960–

== Other ==
- Le National (TV series), Canadian
- Le National (theater), venue in Montreal
