= Ed Bird – Estella Lakes Provincial Park =

Provincial park in British Columbia

- IUCN category II (national park)
- Location within British Columbia
- Interactive map of Ed Bird – Estella Lakes Provincial Park
- Location: Cassiar Land District, British Columbia, Canada
- Nearest city: Mackenzie, BC
- Coordinates: 56°55′59″N 125°05′59″W
- Area: 5,578 ha (13,780 acres)
- Established: April 11, 2001
- Governing body: BC Parks

Ed Bird – Estella Lakes Provincial Park is a provincial park in British Columbia, Canada.

== History and conservation ==
This park was traditionally used by First Nations people.

Before becoming a provincial park on April 11, 2001, it was a forest recreation site and was later made into a protected area.

== Recreation ==
Hunting, fishing, and snowmobiling are allowed within the park grounds.

== Location ==
Located 67 km south of Fort Ware, British Columbia on the Russel Forestry Service Road. The closest community is Mackenzie, British Columbia.

== Size ==
The park is 55.87 square kilometres in size.
