= Nation River (British Columbia) =

Coordinates: 55°29′09″N 123°31′27″W

The Nation River, formerly known as the Tribe River and originally in French as the Rivière au Nation, is a river in the Northern Interior of British Columbia, Canada. Originally a tributary of the Parsnip River, it now feeds Lake Williston via the Nation Arm of that lake, which is the reservoir formed by WAC Bennett Dam. The town of Mackenzie is to the southeast of the river's terminus at the lake.

The river's course drains from the southern Omineca Mountains and its history is closely tied to that of the exploration and trade in the Omineca Country region. Along its course are the Nation Lakes, which are protected by Nation Lakes Provincial Park. The Nation Lakes comprise four lakes on the river's course, Tsayta, Indata, Tchentlo and Chuchi Lakes. The provincial park is in the upper reaches of the river, and incorporates a main parcel around Tsayta and Indata Lakes, and four small parcels on Techntlo and Chuchi Lakes. Nation Mountain, named for the river, stands to the north of Tchento Lake.

== See also ==
- List of rivers of British Columbia
- Nation (disambiguation)
