= Nation Lakes =

Coordinates: 55°12′00″N 124°45′00″W

The Nation Lakes are a series of four lakes in the Nation River system of the Omineca Country of the Central Interior of British Columbia, Canada. The four lakes are, from west to east (downstream), Tsayta, Indata, Tchentlo, and Chuchi Lakes. Nation Lakes Park was established in 2004 as a result of the Fort St. James Land Resource Management Plan and is a popular canoeing destination.

== See also ==
- List of lakes of British Columbia
