= Germansen Landing =

- Location of Germansen Landing in British Columbia
- Coordinates: 55°47′00″N 124°42′00″W
- Country: Canada
- Province: British Columbia
- Area codes: 250, 778, 236

Germansen Landing is an unincorporated settlement on the Omineca River, at the confluence of that river and its tributary the Germansen, in the Northern Interior of British Columbia, Canada. The settlement was a focus of the Omineca Gold Rush of the 1860s.

== Climate ==
Climate data for Germansen Landing
Month	Jan	Feb	Mar	Apr	May	Jun	Jul	Aug	Sep	Oct	Nov	Dec	Year
Record high humidex	11.1	10.8	15.0	26.1	31.2	32.1	34.1	32.5	28.3	20.2	11.7	5.6	34.1
Record high °C (°F)	11.7 (53.1)	11.7 (53.1)	15.6 (60.1)	27.0 (80.6)	34.5 (94.1)	32.2 (90.0)	33.0 (91.4)	33.0 (91.4)	29.5 (85.1)	23.0 (73.4)	11.7 (53.1)	9.7 (49.5)	34.5 (94.1)
Mean daily maximum °C (°F)	−8.7 (16.3)	−3.5 (25.7)	3.1 (37.6)	9.3 (48.7)	15.0 (59.0)	18.9 (66.0)	21.2 (70.2)	20.5 (68.9)	14.9 (58.8)	6.2 (43.2)	−3.0 (26.6)	−7.9 (17.8)	7.2 (45.0)
Daily mean °C (°F)	−13.1 (8.4)	−9.0 (15.8)	−3.4 (25.9)	2.8 (37.0)	7.9 (46.2)	12.2 (54.0)	14.3 (57.7)	13.3 (55.9)	8.6 (47.5)	2.1 (35.8)	−6.4 (20.5)	−11.9 (10.6)	1.5 (34.7)
Mean daily minimum °C (°F)	−17.4 (0.7)	−14.5 (5.9)	−9.9 (14.2)	−3.7 (25.3)	0.8 (33.4)	5.3 (41.5)	7.4 (45.3)	6.0 (42.8)	2.2 (36.0)	−2.1 (28.2)	−9.8 (14.4)	−15.9 (3.4)	−4.3 (24.3)
Record low °C (°F)	−48.8 (−55.8)	−44.4 (−47.9)	−41.1 (−42.0)	−26.7 (−16.1)	−12.8 (9.0)	−3.5 (25.7)	−2.2 (28.0)	−3.9 (25.0)	−12.5 (9.5)	−30.0 (−22.0)	−39.5 (−39.1)	−47.0 (−52.6)	−48.8 (−55.8)
Record low wind chill	−51.8	−42.5	−40.1	−26.1	−8.0	−3.3	−0.6	−2.7	−7.7	−20.0	−41.8	−47.5	−51.8
Average precipitation mm (inches)	50.2 (1.98)	30.1 (1.19)	28.9 (1.14)	25.9 (1.02)	47.5 (1.87)	67.7 (2.67)	58.2 (2.29)	46.8 (1.84)	46.6 (1.83)	50.9 (2.00)	52.1 (2.05)	48.4 (1.91)	553.2 (21.78)
Average rainfall mm (inches)	2.9 (0.11)	1.5 (0.06)	4.7 (0.19)	16.5 (0.65)	44.6 (1.76)	67.4 (2.65)	58.2 (2.29)	46.8 (1.84)	45.4 (1.79)	34.1 (1.34)	7.5 (0.30)	2.2 (0.09)	331.7 (13.06)
Average snowfall cm (inches)	48.4 (19.1)	30.1 (11.9)	25.9 (10.2)	9.6 (3.8)	3.2 (1.3)	0.4 (0.2)	0.0 (0.0)	0.0 (0.0)	1.2 (0.5)	17.5 (6.9)	47.0 (18.5)	47.9 (18.9)	231.2 (91.0)
Average precipitation days (≥ 0.2 mm)	16.6	11.8	11.0	10.3	14.7	15.0	14.8	14.5	13.9	17.0	17.7	17.0	174.3
Average rainy days (≥ 0.2 mm)	1.3	1.3	3.1	7.0	14.1	15.0	14.8	14.5	13.5	12.9	3.4	1.2	102.1
Average snowy days (≥ 0.2 cm)	15.8	11.0	9.4	4.7	1.2	0.1	0.0	0.0	0.7	5.9	15.7	16.2	80.5
Mean monthly sunshine hours	33.7	67.1	121.2	183.0	226.5	218.8	243.3	232.6	147.2	73.3	30.5	23.5	1,600.7
Percentage possible sunshine	14.1	24.8	33.1	43.1	45.0	41.8	46.4	49.9	38.3	22.6	12.2	10.7	31.8
