= Osilinka River =

- Location in Canada

Location
- Country: Canada
- Provins: British Columbia
- District: Cassiar Land District

Osilinka River is a river in the Canadian boreal forest. It is located in the province of British Columbia, approximately 3,500 km west of the national capital, Ottawa, and about 900 km north of the provincial capital, Victoria. The area around the river is heavily pine forested and is almost uninhabited, with less than two inhabitants per square kilometre. It is part of the boreal climate zones, with annual average temperatures of approximately -2 °C. The warmest month is July, when the average temperature is 12 °C, and the coldest is January,-14 °C.

== See also ==
- List of rivers of British Columbia
