= Toodoggone River =

Coordinates: 57°24′00″N 126°33′00″W

The Toodoggone River is a tributary of the Finlay River in the Northern Interior of British Columbia, Canada, flowing east into the upper reaches of the Finlay just south of the Fishing Lakes. At the head of the Toodoggone is Metsantan Pass, which is at the divide with the Stikine River basin and also on the spine of the Continental Divide.

== Name origin ==
The name is an English adaptation of the older, more aboriginal name Thudegane, which is an adaptation of the Sekani language term Tuhda Ughane, meaning "Two Brothers River" or "eagles nest".

== See also ==
- List of rivers of British Columbia
- List of aboriginal placenames in Canada
