= Williston Lake =

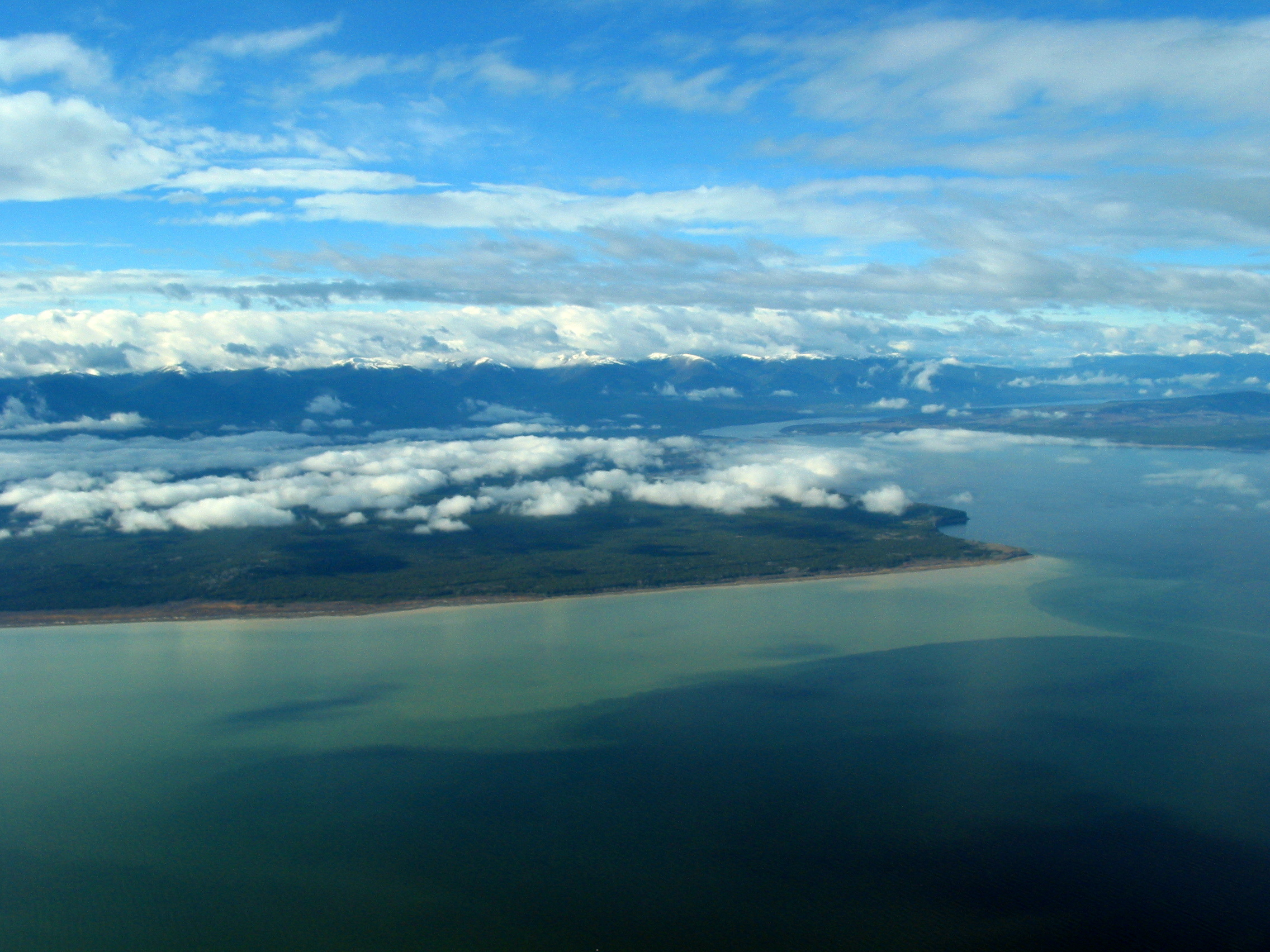

- Location within British Columbia
- Location: British Columbia
- Coordinates: 56°N 124°W
- Type: Reservoir
- Primary inflows: Peace River
- Primary outflows: Peace River
- Basin countries: Canada
- Max. length: 251 km (156 mi)
- Max. width: 155 km (96 mi)
- Surface area: 1,761 km^{2} (680 sq mi)
- Average depth: 42 m (138 ft)
- Water volume: 74 cubic kilometres (60,000,000 acre⋅ft)
- Surface elevation: 671 m (2,201 ft) (level varies by 18 m)

Williston Lake is a reservoir created by the W. A. C. Bennett Dam which is located in the Northern Interior of British Columbia, Canada.

== Geography ==
The lake fills the basin of the upper Peace River, backing into the Rocky Mountain Trench which is where the Parsnip and Finlay met at Finlay Forks to form the Peace. The lake includes three reaches, the Peace Reach (formerly the Peace Canyon), and the Parsnip and Finlay Reaches, which are the lowermost basins of those rivers, and covers a total area of 1,761 km^{2} (680 sq mi), being the largest lake in British Columbia and the seventh largest reservoir (by volume) in the world.

The reservoir is fed by the Finlay, Omineca, Ingenika, Ospika, Parsnip, Manson, Nation and Nabesche rivers and by Clearwater Creek, Carbon Creek, and other smaller creeks.

Several provincial parks are maintained on the shore of the lake, including Muscovite Lakes Provincial Park, Butler Ridge Provincial Park, Heather-Dina Lakes Provincial Park and Ed Bird-Estella Provincial Park.

A floating island was discovered on the Reservoir in 2026.

=== Tributaries ===
The following rivers empty into the Williston Reservoir, in clockwise order from the Peace River outlet:

- Parsnip River
- Pack River
- Nation River
- Manson River
- Omineca River
- Osilinka River
- Mesilinka River
- Ingenika River
- Finlay River
- Davis River
- Ospika River
- Wicked River
- West Nabesche River
- Nabesche River

Additionally, the following creeks empty into Williston Reservoir, in clockwise order from the Peace River outlet (this list is not comprehensive):

- Carbon Creek
- Ducette Creek
- Clearwater Creek
- Point Creek
- Selwyn Creek
- Weston Creek
- Scott Creek
- Patsuk Creek
- Cutthumb Creek
- Tony Creek
- Tutu Creek
- Mugaha Creek
- Chichouyenily Creek
- Gagnon Creek
- Mischinsinlika Creek
- Lignite Creek
- Scovil Creek
- Tsedeka Creek
- Dastaiga Creek
- Blackwater Creek
- Eklund Creek
- Fries Creek
- Strandberg Creek
- Chunamon Creek
- Tear Creek
- Pete Toy Creek
- Lorimer Creek
- Ole Creek
- Mica Creek
- Factor Ross Creek
- Frank Creek
- Isola Creek
- Ruby Red Creek
- Ivor Creek
- Police Creek
- Chowika Creek
- Shovel Creek
- Brain Creek
- Collins Creek
- Lafferty Creek
- Bevel Creek
- Lost Cabin Creek
- Bernard Creek
- Weasel Creek
- Schooler Creek
- Dunlevy Creek
- Cust Creek

== History ==
Williston Lake was created in 1968 by the building of the W. A. C. Bennett Dam on the Peace River, which flooded the territory and homes of the Tsay Keh Dene First Nation.

The reservoir was named after the Honourable Ray Gillis Williston, at the time the Minister of Lands, Forests and Water Resources.

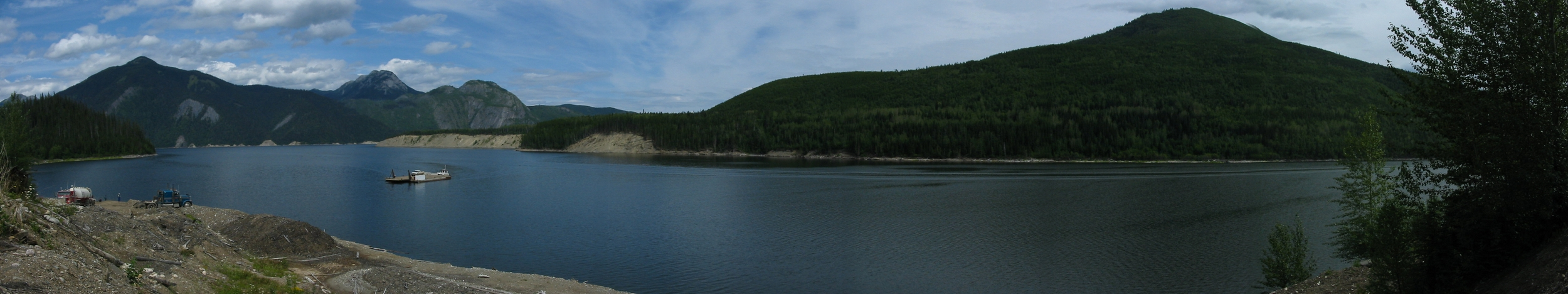
Barge on Williston Lake

== See also ==
- List of lakes of British Columbia
- List of rivers of British Columbia
