= Omineca River =

River in British Columbia, Canada

Coordinates: 56°07′N 124°29′W

Omineca River is a river of the North American boreal forest, in northern British Columbia, Canada. It flows into Williston Lake, and is part of the Peace River basin. Before the creation of Williston Lake, the Omineca was a tributary of the Finlay River. According to Father Adrien-Gabriel Morice the name is derived from a Sekani word meaning 'lake-like or sluggish river'.

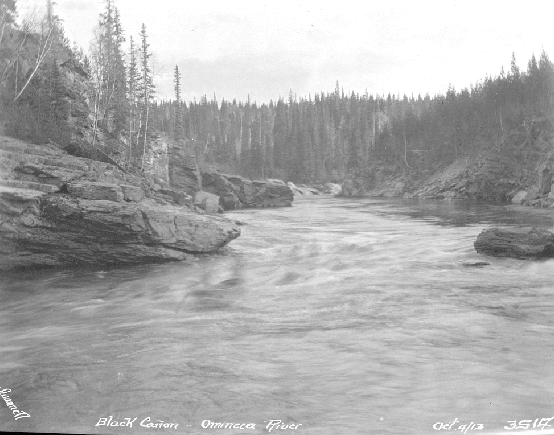
Omineca River circa 1913

== Tributaries ==
- Ominicetla Creek
- Germansen River
- Osilinka River
- Mesilinka River
- Silver Creek (Omineca River tributary)

== See also ==
- List of rivers of British Columbia
