= Ingenika River =

Location
- Country: Canada
- Province: British Columbia
- District: Cassiar Land District

Physical characteristics
- Mouth
  - location: Williston Lake
  - coordinates: 56°44′18″N 125°02′13″W
  - elevation: 690 metres (2,260 ft)

Basin features
- River system: Mackenzie River

The Ingenika River is a river located in the Canadian boreal forest, in the province of British Columbia.

The surroundings of the Ingenika River are mainly coniferous forest. The area around the river is almost uninhabited, with fewer than two inhabitants per square kilometre. The area is part of the boreal climate zone. The mean annual temperature is −3 °C. The warmest month is July, when the average temperature is 10 °C, and the coldest is December, with −14 °C.

Ingenika River

Climate chart (precipitation, max. and min. temperature)
J	F	M	A	M	J	J	A	S	O	N	D
0 −13 −15	0 −12 −17	0 −9 −14	0 1 −8	0 8 −2	0 14 5	0 15 6	0 14 6	0 8 0	0 0 −6	0 −10 −13	0 −14 −15
- █ Average max. and min. temperatures in °C
- █ Precipitation totals in mm
Imperial conversion
J	F	M	A	M	J	J	A	S	O	N	D
0 9 5	0 10 1	0 16 7	0 34 18	0 46 28	0 57 41	0 59 43	0 57 43	0 46 32	0 32 21	0 14 9	0 7 5
- █ Average max. and min. temperatures in °F
- █ Precipitation totals in inches

== See also ==
- List of rivers of British Columbia
