= Finlay River =

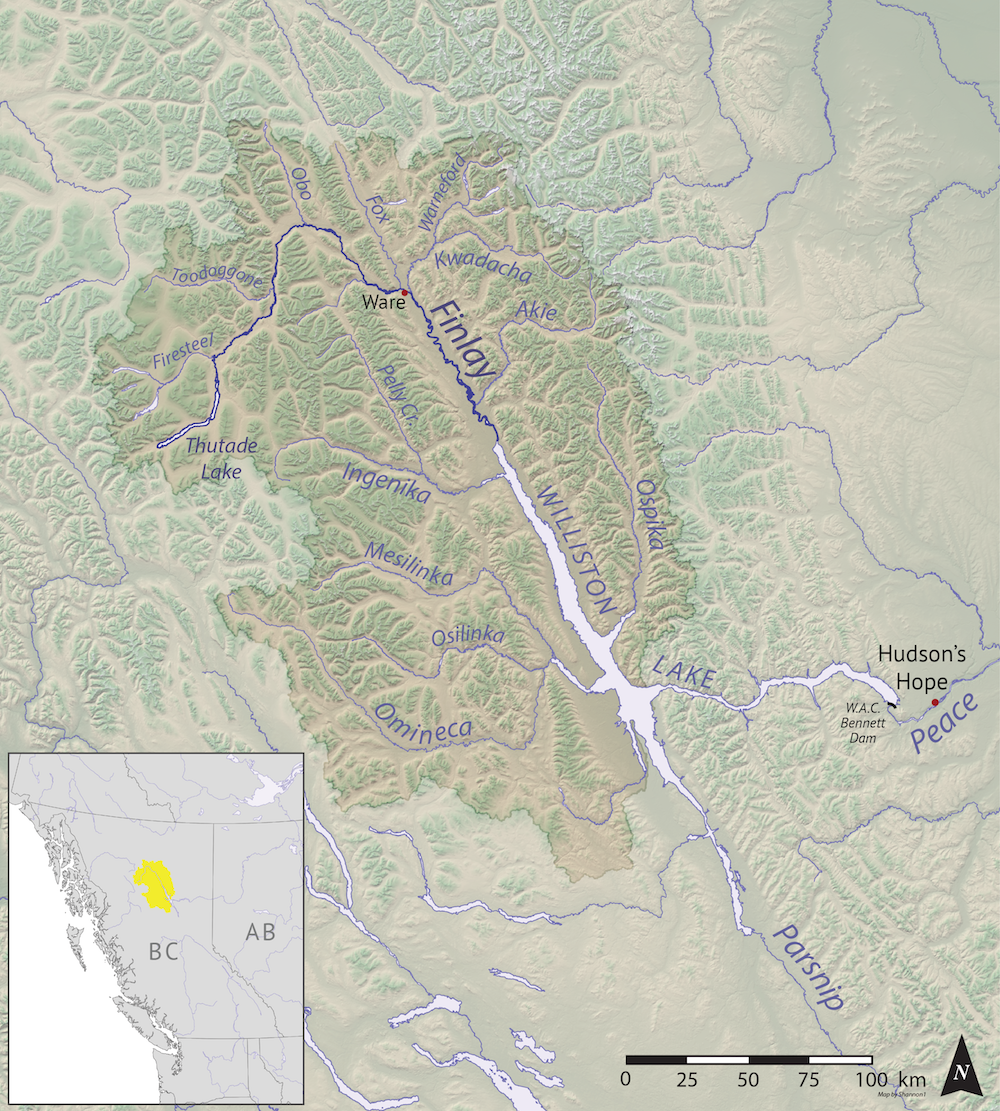
- Map of the Finlay River

Location
- Country: Canada
- Province: British Columbia
- District: Cassiar Land District

Physical characteristics
- Source
  - location: Thutade Lake
  - coordinates: 57.07513°N 126.89063°W
  - elevation: 1,200 metres (3,900 ft)
- Mouth
  - location: Williston Lake
  - coordinates: 56.89397°N 124.95057°W
  - elevation: 700 metres (2,300 ft)
- Length: 420 km (260 mi)
- Basin size: 43,000 km^{2} (17,000 sq mi)
- Discharge
  - average: 680 cubic metres per second (24,000 cu ft/s)

The Finlay River is a 402 km long river in north-central British Columbia flowing north and thence south from Thutade Lake in the Omineca Mountains to Williston Lake, the impounded waters of the Peace River formed by the completion of the W.A.C. Bennett Dam in 1968. Prior to this, the Finlay joined with the Parsnip River to form the Peace. The headwaters of the Finlay at Thutade Lake are considered the ultimate source of the Mackenzie River. Deserters Canyon is located just north of Williston Lake.

The Finlay drains an area of 43,000 square kilometres and discharges at a mean rate of 600 cubic metres per second. Major tributaries of the Finlay include the Ospika, Ingenika, Warneford, Fox, Toodoggone, and Firesteel Rivers (the Ospika now enters Lake Williston directly, however). Located in a remote part of the province, there are no population centres along the river, however, there is a small First Nations community, Fort Ware, located at the junction of the Finlay and Warneford. Tatlatui Provincial Park protects the area of the Tatlatui Range, where Thutade Lake is located.

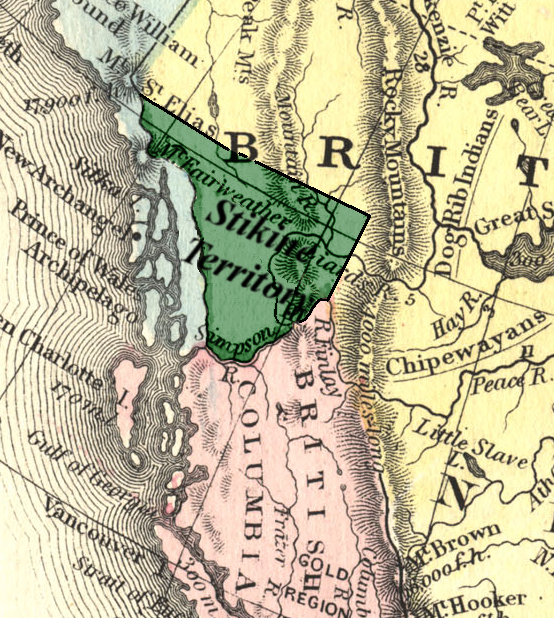
Map of the Stikine Territory. The line of the Finlay River is the southeast boundary of the territory, which was absorbed into the Colony of British Columbia in 1863.

The Finlay River is named for the explorer John Finlay, who travelled a short way up the river in 1797. The first European to journey its length to its source was the fur trader and explorer Samuel Black in 1824. The river was the eastern half of the northern boundary of the Colony of British Columbia at the time of its creation in 1858, north of which was the North-Western Territory; the western half of the boundary was the Nass River and from 1862 to 1863 it was briefly the southern boundary of the Stickeen Territories (Stikine Territory) which had been formed from the North-Western Territory in response to the Peace and Stikine Gold Rushes and which was amalgamated with the Colony of British Columbia in the following year.

== Tributaries ==
- Firesteel River
- Toodoggone River
- Fox River
- Kwadacha River
- Paul River
- Akie River
- Ingenika River
- Davis River
- Mesilinka River
- Osilinka River

== See also ==
- List of rivers of British Columbia
