= Omineca Country =

Historical geographic region of the Northern Interior of British Columbia

The Omineca Country, also called the Omineca District or the Omineca, is a historical geographic region in the Northern Interior of British Columbia, roughly defined by the basin of the Omineca River but including areas to the south which allowed access to the region during the Omineca Gold Rush of the 1860s. The term Omineca District also refers to the Omineca Mining District which referred to the same area but was a government administrative division. Today the name loosely refers to the region northwest of Prince George and north of Hwy 16 (the Yellowhead Highway) and occurs in the names of such entities as electoral districts, e.g. Prince George-Omineca.

== See also ==
- Cariboo
- Chilcotin District
- Lost Creek
- Peace River Block
- Silver Creek
- Slate Creek
- Stikine Country
