= Kaska (disambiguation) =

Kaska may refer to:

== Ethnology ==
Canada

- Kaska Dena (the Kaskas), a Canadian First Nations people of Northern B.C. and Southern Yukon, one of the aboriginal peoples of northwest North America
- Kaska language (Kaska), a Northern Athabaskan language spoken, the language of the Kaska Dena
- Kaska Nation, a tribal nation in Northern B.C., Southern Yukon, and Western N.W.T.
- Kaska Tribal Council, a tribal council in northern B.C., southern Yukon, and western N.W.T.

Ancient Anatolia

- Kaskians (the Kaska), an Anatolian people, the inveterate enemies of the Hittites
- Kaskian language (Kaska), the language of the Anatolian people

== People ==
Surnamed

- Olaf Kaska (born 1973), German coxswain
- Pavel Kaška (born 1988), Czech figure skater
- Tony Kaska (1911–1994), American football player

Given named

- Kaśka Rogulska (born 1968), a Polish-Dutch longtrack speedskater

== Places ==
- Kaska Lake, Nelson Island, South Shetland Islands, Antarctica; a lake

== Other uses ==
- the Kaska tribe, a fictional people from the Japanese comic book Red River (manga)

== See also ==
- Cassiar (disambiguation), a term derived from the Dene term Kaska
- Kaskas (disambiguation)
- Kaskaskia (disambiguation)
- Kaskian (disambiguation)
