= Horneline Creek Provincial Park =

Provincial park in British Columbia, Canada

Horenline Creek Provincial Park
- IUCN category II (national park)
- Location within British Columbia
- Interactive map of Horenline Creek Provincial Park
- Location: Cassiar Land District, British Columbia, Canada
- Nearest city: Liard River, BC
- Coordinates: 59°00′04″N 127°17′09″W
- Area: 298 ha (740 acres)
- Established: June 28, 1999
- Governing body: BC Parks

Horneline Creek Provincial Park is a provincial park in far northern British Columbia, Canada. It is located west of the Kechika River about 130 km south of Lower Post and 30 km north of Denetiah Provincial Park and southwest of the community of Liard River. It can be accessed via river boat or by foot.

The park protects mountain goat habitat, namely a canyon formed by Horneline Creek cutting through a glacial terrace, and is accessed via the Kechika River, with a 250 km boat trip from Fireside. The Davie Trail, a historic trail from Fort Ware to Lower Post, traverses part of the Kechika River next to the Rocky Mountain Trench.

== Flora and fauna ==
The steep-walled canyon formed by Horneline Creek's course through the glacial terrace has exposed a natural mineral lick, attracting 60 to 75 goats at a time. Grasslands and groups of aspen line the canyon's rim.

== See also ==
- List of British Columbia provincial parks
