= Nahani =

Term describing First Nations in Western Canada

Nahani (Nahane, Nahanni) is an Athabaskan word used to designate First Nations groups located in British Columbia, the Northwest Territories and Yukon between the upper Liard River and the 64th parallel north latitude. Nahane translates as "people of the west."

While these Native groups do not necessarily have anything in common, the Canadian government used the term "Nahani" until the 1970s to refer to them collectively. It has largely been replaced by more specific terms.

The group term applied to several distinct tribes:

- Kaska Dena, located between the Dease River and the Beaver River, divided into two main regional groupings, and further divided into bands:
  - Titshotina or Hés tʼat gudene - ″Among the Mountain People″ to the east, between the Cassiar Mountains and Liard and Dease Rivers, in British Columbia.
  - Tsezotine (″Big Water People″), to the west of the Titshotina / Hés tʼat gudene.
  - Takutine, a Kaska band on Teslin River and Teslin Lake, and upper Taku River.
  - Pelly River Indians: The Pelly and Ross River tribes were destroyed in 1884, likely by a band of Sahtu (also known as North Slavey and formerly as Hare Indians). A band consisting of two survivors as well as members from surrounding tribes reformed in the same area under this name.
  - Esbataottine (″Goat People″) (also: Espatodena, (E)spa’totena, Espa tah dena, located north and west of the Kaska along the Beaver River, South Nahanni River, and North Nahanni River.
- Dahotena, Etagottine (″Air People″), in the valleys of Gravel and Dahachuni rivers.
- Achetotena, or Etchareottine
- Tagish, about Tagish Lake and Marsh Lake.
- Tahltan were sometimes considered a Nahani tribe.
- Abbatotine ("Bighorn People") (Note: Also Abbato-Tena, Abbatotena, Abbatotenah, Abbatotinneh, Abbatotinney.)

Most of these First Nations are speakers of Southern Tutchone and Kaska languages.

The term Nahani came into use by Anglo-Canadians in the early 19th century and described these Western Indigenous nations who weren't directly involved in the fur trade.

== See also ==
- Liard First Nation
