= Kaskian =

Kaskian may refer to:

- Kaskians, an ancient Anatolian ethnic group
- Kaskian language, spoken by these Anatolian people
- Kaska Dena, a Canadian First Nations people
- Kaska language, the language of the Kaska Dena

== See also ==
- Cassiar (disambiguation)
- Kaska (disambiguation)
- Kaskas (disambiguation)
- Kaskaskia (disambiguation)
