= Tintina Trench =

Valley in Yukon, Canada

Coordinates: 63°25′0″N 137°0′0″W

The Tintina Trench is a roughly 970-kilometre-long (600-mile) valley extending from southwestern Yukon, Canada to the Yukon Flats in the central portion of the U.S. state of Alaska. It is a prominent topographic lineament along the northern extension of the Northern Rocky Mountain Trench in British Columbia and it has its origin from the Tintina Fault.

It was named by R.G. McConnell of the Geological Survey of Canada in 1904 after an indigenous word for “chief.”

The Tintina Trench crosses the Continental Divide between the Pacific Ocean and the Arctic Ocean near Finlayson Lake, between Ross River and Watson Lake. The northwestern part of the valley is occupied by the Yukon River before it flows northwestward into Alaska. The central part of the valley is occupied by the Pelly River before its confluence with the Yukon River at Fort Selkirk. The southern Tintina Trench is drained by the Liard River which first flows south-eastward, then eastward and finally merges into the Mackenzie River at Fort Simpson, NWT where the combined waters turn back north for the Mackenzie's long flow to the Arctic Ocean.

Communities and features of the Trench include the following:

- Lower Post, BC on the Liard Plain, see 'last outpost of civilization' by George Mercer Dawson.
- Watson Lake, Yukon on the Liard Plain, but a waypoint for travel up the Tintina
- Ross River, Yukon
- Faro, Yukon
- Stewart Crossing, Yukon
- Dawson City, Yukon lying just west of and outside the actual Tintina Trench
- Forty Mile, Yukon
- Eagle, Alaska
- Robert Campbell Highway

== Geology ==
The location of the Tintina Trench corresponds with recessive weathering rocks which have been deformed by 450 km of right lateral faulting along the Tintina Fault.
