= McDame (disambiguation) =

McDame is an abandoned settlement in British Columbia, Canada.

McDame may also refer to:

- McDame Creek, a creek in British Columbia
- McDames Creek Indian Reserve No. 2

== People with the surname ==
- Harry McDame, Canadian prospector
