= Sharktooth Mountain =

Mountain in British Columbia, Canada

- Location within British Columbia

Highest point
- Elevation: 2,668 m (8,753 ft)
- Prominence: 1,653 m (5,423 ft)
- Listing: Mountains of British Columbia; Canada prominent peaks 92nd
- Coordinates: 58°35′15″N 127°57′44″W

Geography
- Location: British Columbia, Canada
- District: Cassiar Land District
- Parent range: Stikine Ranges, Cassiar Mountains
- Topo map: NTS 94L12 Sharktooth Mountain

Sharktooth Mountain is a 2,668-metre (8,753 ft) mountain in the Stikine Ranges of the Northern Interior of British Columbia, Canada, located between the Cassiar and Dall Rivers. It has a prominence of 1,653 m, created by the pass at the Frog Lakes between the Pitman River, a tributary of the Stikine and the Frog River, a tributary of the Kechika.
