= Dall River =

Coordinates: 58°46′25″N 127°50′34″W

The Dall River is a river in northern British Columbia, Canada, flowing northwest into the Turnagain River, a tributary of the Kechika, to the west of Mount Skook Davidson. Originally named the Cold Fish River, it was renamed in 1944 to avoid confusion with another river of that name that is a tributary of the Spatsizi, and because of the presence of Dall's sheep in the area. Dall Lake is along its course, south of Dall River Old Growth Provincial Park, which lies between the lake and the confluence with the Turnagain. Denetiah Provincial Park, on the river's upper course, includes Dall Lake.

== See also ==
- List of rivers of British Columbia
