= McDame =

- Location of McDame in British Columbia McDame (Canada)
- Coordinates: 59°11′00″N 129°14′00″W
- Country: Canada
- Province: British Columbia

McDame, also known originally as McDame Post or McDames Creek Post and also known as Fort McDame is an abandoned settlement in the Cassiar Country of the Northern Interior of British Columbia,

McDame got its name from McDame Creek, which had been prospected in 1874 by Harry McDame (originally from the Bahamas, by way of California) and his partner John Giscome (originally from Jamaica; see Giscome Portage). McDame Creek was the site of an 1877 find of a 72-ounce gold nugget worth $1,300 (c.%52,000 today), which was the largest in British Columbia's history. A trading post located at the creek's confluence with the Dease River, owned by Robert Sylvester, was sold to the Hudson's Bay Company in 1875 and remained in operation until closing in 1943, with the locality being abandoned by 1960. McDames Creek Indian Reserve No. 2 is nearby.
