= Dune Za Keyih Provincial Park and Protected Area =

Provincial park of British Columbia, Canada

- IUCN category Ib (wilderness area)
- Location within British Columbia
- Interactive map of Dune Za Keyih Provincial Park and Protected Area
- Location: Stikine Region, British Columbia, Canada
- Coordinates: 58°23′59″N 126°18′00″W
- Area: 346,833 ha (1,339.13 sq mi)
- Established: April 5, 2001
- Governing body: BC Parks

Dune Za Keyih Provincial Park and Protected Area, also known as the Frog-Gataga Provincial Park, is a provincial park in British Columbia, Canada. It is part of the larger Muskwa-Kechika Management Area and is located in the area of the Gataga River, between Denetiah Provincial Park, which lies west across the Kechika River, and Kwadacha Wilderness Provincial Park to its east.

Established in 2001 as Frog-Gataga, the park is 346,833 hectares in area; its newer name is a Kaska Dena translation of Frog-Gataga.

== Geography ==
The park itself is centered in the Rocky Mountain Trench in British Columbia. It encompasses a large area around the Gataga River, making it the largest unlogged portion of any watershed in British Columbia. This also means that it is far away from the impact of humans, allowing for wildlife to live and hunt safely. The plant and animal communities are also free from pollution, which has resulted in both being intact.

== Accessibility ==
Due to the isolated nature of the park and the difficulty of the surrounding mountainous terrain, access to the Dune Za Keyih is best done via floatplane or helicopter. Occasionally, jet boats can access the park through the Kechika River, but there is often log jams, making it impassible.

== See also ==
- Dane-zaa
