= Major Hart River =

River in British Columbia, Canada

Coordinates: 59°00′51″N 127°51′27″W

The Major Hart River (Ts'íhe Tú in Kaska) is a river in northern British Columbia, Canada, flowing north-east into the Turnagain River, a tributary of the Kechika, south-west of the community of Liard River.

== Name origin ==
The river is named for E.B. Hart, FRGS, who was the first to map this river and conducted the first survey of the area in 1913–14. Major Hart was a member of the Royal North-West Mounted Police who explored the area between Dease Lake and Fort Nelson.

== See also ==
- List of rivers of British Columbia
