= Ross River =

Ross River may refer to the following:

== Rivers ==
- Ross River (Queensland), the main river that flows through Townsville, Queensland, Australia
- Ross River (Eastmain River), a tributary of the Eastmain River, in Nord-du-Québec, Québec, Canada
- Ross River (Yukon), one of the main tributaries of the Pelly River, Canada

== Other uses ==
- Ross River, Yukon, an unincorporated community located where the Ross River meets the Pelly
- Ross River Dena Council, a First Nations group in Ross River
- Ross River Airport, the airport that serves the community

== See also ==
- Ross River Dam, located at the end of Riverway Drive in the City of Townsville
- Ross Creek (North Queensland), a tributary of the Ross River, near Townsville
- Jos-Ross River, a river of Quebec
- Ross River virus, an arbovirus of the genus Alphavirus
- Ross River Fever, a mosquito-transmitted Alphavirus
