= Dall River Old Growth Provincial Park =

Provincial park in the Stikine Region of British Columbia, Canada

- IUCN category II (national park)
- Location within British Columbia
- Interactive map of Dall River Old Growth Provincial Park
- Location: Cassiar Land District, British Columbia, Canada
- Nearest city: Fort St. John, BC
- Coordinates: 58°39′34″N 127°42′30″W
- Area: 642 ha (1,590 acres)
- Established: June 28, 1999
- Governing body: BC Parks

Dall River Old Growth Provincial Park is a provincial park in British Columbia, Canada. It is part of the larger Muskwa-Kechika Management Area and is located immediately northwest of Denetiah Provincial Park, northwest of the junction of the Gataga and Kechika Rivers. Established in 1999, the park is 642 ha. in area. The park protects areas of white spruce old growth.

== Recreation ==
The park has various trail systems, as there are hiking, canoeing, and horseback options available.
