= Big Blue (disambiguation) =

Big Blue is a nickname for IBM, an American multinational technology and consulting company.

Big Blue or big blue may also refer to:

== Arts and entertainment ==
- "Big Blue" (song), a 2019 song by Vampire Weekend from the album Father of the Bride
- Big Blue (TV series), a Canadian animated television series
- The Big Blue, a 1988 film by director Luc Besson
- A legendary lake monster in The X-Files episode "Quagmire"
- A recurring location in the F-Zero series
- A fictional blue whale in Ecco the Dolphin
- A nickname for Superman, short for "Big Blue Boy Scout"
- A nickname for the blue whale.

== Sports ==
- IBM Big Blue (rugby union), a Japanese rugby union team founded by IBM
- The Big Blue (A-Leagues), a football rivalry between A-League sides Sydney FC and Melbourne Victory, Australia
- Big Blue (mascot), the mascot of Old Dominion University, Virginia, US
- Big Blue Nation, the fan base of the athletics programs at the University of Kentucky, US
- New York Giants, an American football team based in New Jersey, US
- Bob Pettit (1932–2026), former NBA player
- Millikin University, Illinois, US
- The mascot of Utah State University, US
- The mascot of the Pingry School, New Jersey, US
- The sports teams at Phillips Academy, Massachusetts, US
- Toronto Varsity Blues ("The Big Blue"), the sports teams of the University of Toronto
- A large type of American handball

== Other uses ==
- Big Blue (crane), a crane that collapsed during the construction of Miller Park
- Big Blue (drink), a soft drink
- Big Blue Bus, Santa Monican bus service
- Conrail, the primary Class I railroad in the Northeast U.S. between 1976 and 1999
- The Big Blue Hotel, a hotel at Blackpool Pleasure Beach, UK
- A nickname for the Church of Scientology's Pacific Area Command Base

== See also ==
- Big Blue River (disambiguation), several rivers
