= Blue River =

Blue River may refer to:

== Rivers ==
=== Canada ===
- Blue River (North Thompson River tributary), British Columbia
- Blue River (Dease River tributary), British Columbia

=== China ===
- Yangtze River, sometimes referred to as the Blue River in older English sources

=== New Zealand ===
- Blue River (New Zealand), South Island

=== United States ===
- Blue River (Arizona), a tributary of the San Francisco River
- Blue River (Colorado), a tributary of the Colorado River
- Blue River (Indiana), a tributary of the Ohio River
- Blue River (Missouri River tributary), in Missouri
- Blue River (Oklahoma), a tributary of the Red River
- Blue River (Oregon), a tributary of the McKenzie River
- Blue River (Wisconsin), a river of Wisconsin, a tributary of the Wisconsin River

== Communities ==
=== Canada ===
- Blue River, British Columbia, an unincorporated settlement
  - Blue River station, a Canadian National Railway station
- Blue River Indian Reserve No. 1, in British Columbia

=== United States ===
- Blue River, Colorado
- Blue River, Indiana
- Blue River, Kentucky
- Blue River, Oregon
- Blue River, Wisconsin

== Other uses ==
- Blue River (film), a 1995 television film
- Blue River (album), by Eric Andersen, 1972
- "Blue River" (song), by Elvis Presley, 1965
- Blue River, a 1992 novel by Ethan Canin, basis for the film
- "Blue River", a 1920s piano roll cut by Dagmar Nordstrom

== See also ==
- Big Blue River (disambiguation)
- Little Blue River (disambiguation)
- Blue River Township (disambiguation)
- Río Azul (Spanish for Blue River), a Mayan archaeological site
