= Kaskas =

Kaskas may refer to:

- Kaska Dena, a North American First Nations people
- Kaskians, a Bronze Age people also called Kaska
- Poppy seeds, also called kas-kas
- Qashqai people, a primarily Turkic people in Iran
- Saki Kaskas (1971-2016), a Greek-Canadian music producer.

== See also ==
- Gas Gas, a Spanish motorcycle manufacturer
- Kaskian (disambiguation)
- Kaskaskia (disambiguation)
- Kaska (disambiguation)
- Kas (disambiguation)
- Cassiar (disambiguation), a term derived from Kaskas
