= McDames Creek Indian Reserve No. 2 =

Coordinates: 59°11′00″N 129°14′00″W

McDames Creek 2 is a Statistics Canada census designation for what is properly known as McDames Creek Indian Reserve No. 2, which flanks both sides of the Dease River at its confluence with McDame Creek in northwestern British Columbia, Canada. It was named for the 19th-century gold rush prospector Harry McDame. The reserve is under the administration of the Liard First Nation, a government of the Kaska Dena people and a member government of the Kaska Tribal Council.
