= Rose River =

Rose River may refer to:

- Rose River (Victoria), a river in the state of Victoria, Australia
- Rose River (Arnhem Land), a river in the Northern Territory, Australia
- Rose River (Virginia), a river in the state of Virginia, in the United States of America

== See also ==
- Teton River (Montana), also called the Rose River
- Ross River (disambiguation)
