= Frog Lakes =

Group of lakes in British Columbia, Canada

Coordinates: 58°02′27″N 127°23′48″W

The Frog Lakes are a group of lakes, drained eastward by an unnamed stream feeding the Frog River, a tributary of the Kechika River in the Stikine Ranges of the northern interior of British Columbia. Though not the hydrological source of the Frog River, the lakes are in an east–west aligned valley which forms the divide between the basins of the Stikine River and that of the Liard, and are therefore on the Continental Divide between the Pacific and Arctic drainages. Draining from their west is the Pitman River, a Stikine tributary, from an unnamed lake just to their west (which also drains east to feed the Frog Lakes themselves), while the Kechika is a major tributary of the Liard, which is a tributary of the Mackenzie. Frog Lakes Pass, at an elevation of 1015 m (3330 ft), is the prominence col for the 2668 m (8753 ft) Sharktooth Mountain, giving it a prominence of 1653 m.

== See also ==
- List of lakes of British Columbia
