= Liard River First Nation =

The Liard River First Nation, also known as the Liard First Nation (pronounced "lee-ahrd") is a First Nation in the southeastern Yukon in Canada. Its main centres are Upper Liard and Watson Lake along the Alaska Highway. The language originally spoken by the people of this First Nation was Kaska and the First Nation is a member of the Kaska Tribal Council which is pursuing land claims in the Yukon and northern British Columbia. Their Indian and Northern Affairs Canada band number is 502.

== Population and demographics ==
Its registered population in June 2011 was 1,152.

== Indian reserves ==
Indian reserves under the governance of the Liard First Nation are:

- Blue River IR No.1, on the left bank of the Blue River at its confluence with the Dease, 65.20 ha.
- Dease River IR No.2 (Liard River Band), 6.4 km northeast of the confluence of the Blue and Dease Rivers, 157.40 ha.
- Dease River Indian Reserve No.3 (Liard River Band), left bank of the Dease River opposite the mouth of the Rapid River, 51.40 ha.
- Horse Ranch IR No.4, at Horse Ranch Pass, 14 miles north of Dease River I.R. No.3, 247.30 ha.
- Liard River IR No.3, left bank of the Liard River one mile south of Lower Post., 271.90 ha.
- McDames Creek IR No.3, left bank of the Dease River on both banks of the mouth of McDame Creek
- Mosquito Creek IR No.5, on the Major Hart River, a tributary of the Turnagain River, 30 miles northeast of Cry Lake, 518 ha.
- Muddy River IR No.1, on the left bank of the Liard River at Mile Post 540 of the Alaska Highway 70.80 ha.
- One Mile Point IR No.1, at the north end of Dease Lake at the outlet of the Dease River, opposite Porter's Landing, 47.70 ha.
