= Kudz Ze Kayah mine =

- Location: Yukon, Canada
- Products: Zinc, Copper, Lead

The Kudz Ze Kayah mine is a mining project proposed by BMC Minerals Ltd., located within the Kaska traditional territory in the Finlayson District in Southeast Yukon, Canada. The project is assessed under the Yukon Environmental and Scio-economic Assessment Act (YESAA). The project expects to produce an average of 240,000 tonnes of zinc, copper and lead annually through open-pit and underground activity, and will be in operation for a minimum of 10 years. On June 14, 2022, the Kaska Nation submitted issues and concerns regarding the project proposal. On June 15, 2022, the project was given final approval by the Government of Canada and the Government of Yukon.

== Legal Challenges and Indigenous Opposition ==
The Kaska Nation in relation to this project includes four First Nations: the Ross River Dena Council (RRDC), Liard First Nation (LFN), Kwadacha Nation (KN) and Dease River First Nation (DRFN). The proposed Kudz Ze Kaya mine is located within Kaska territory and is named after a sacred Kaska area, kudz ze kayah, meaning "caribou country." This region is an area of cultural significance, serving as a core migratory ground for the Finlayson caribou herd and habitat for other plants and animals that Kaska have relied on for generations. Additionally, it encompasses burial grounds, traditional travel and trade route, which are important to Kaska heritage. The opposition by Kaska Nation concerns how this project development would disrupt these ecological and cultural landscapes, and threaten the Finlayson caribou which are listed as "special concern" under the Species at Risk Act. Concerns have also been sxpressed regarding impacts on water quality of streams, lakes and rivers, the effects on access to traditional lands and travel use, disruptions to hunting and other traditional land uses, and broader harm to the land and associated cultural practices.

In July 2022, the Ross River Dena Council (RRDC) filed a judicial review of the June 2022 decision document, arguing that the consultation process was inadequate and that their concerns regarding the project proposal were neither respected nor properly considered.

In December 2023, the Yukon appeal court ruled in favour of the Kaska Nation, quashing the new approval for the project and ordering that consultation take place on Kudz Ze Kayah's economic feasibility.

In January 2024, the supreme court of Yukon ruled that the crown failed to adequately consult the Kaska nation regarding the project. Following this, on February 7 and 8th there was an additional consultation meeting held in Ross River, with Kasak elders, leadership, federal and territorial officials and a neutral third-party chair in attendance. A decision document was issued pursuant to the courts order fixing the issues within the decision document from 2022. The meeting covered key topics: Caribou, Contamination of Land, Water & Air, Project Economics and Feasibility, Cumulative Effects, Kaska Laws and Jurisdiction, and Cultural/Spiritual Rights. Many new terms were added into the decision document in order to meet the pre-conditions laid out in 2017.

As of 2025, the Kudz Ze Kayah Project remains under regulatory review, with continued consultation between the Kaska Nation, Canada and the Yukon Government on environmental, cultural, and economic issues. The Yukon board has recommended another exploration project with the new conditions taken under consideration
