= Blue River (Dease River tributary) =

River in British Columbia, Canada

Coordinates: 59°41′35″N 128°57′50″W

The Blue River is a tributary of the Dease River in the Cassiar Country of the Northern Interior of British Columbia, Canada, flowing southeast into the latter river at the Blue River Indian Reserve No. 1 of the Liard First Nation.

== See also ==
- List of rivers of British Columbia
- Blue River (North Thompson River), another Blue River near the community of the same name on the North Thompson River
- Blue River (disambiguation)
