= Cassiar =

Cassiar may refer to:

- Cassiar, British Columbia, a ghost town in northern British Columbia
- Stewart-Cassiar Highway, the northwesternmost highway in British Columbia
- Cassiar Mountains, in northern British Columbia and southern Yukon
- Cassiar Land District, a cadastral survey division of British Columbia
- Cassiar River, a tributary of the Turnagain River
- Cassiar Tunnel (sometimes called the Cassiar Connector), a highway traffic tunnel on the Trans-Canada Highway in Vancouver, British Columbia
- Cassiar (electoral district), a former provincial electoral district in northern British Columbia
- Cassiar Gold Rush (1873), a gold rush in British Columbia
- Cassiar Country, a historical region in British Columbia

== See also ==
- Cassia (disambiguation)
- Kaskian (disambiguation), a term that derives Cassiar
- Kaskas (disambiguation), a term that derives Cassiar
- Kaska (disambiguation), a term that derives Cassiar
