= Blue River Indian Reserve No. 1 =

Coordinates: 59°42′00″N 128°58′00″W

Blue River 1 is the Statistics Canada census-area designation for what is properly termed the Blue River Indian Reserve No. 1, an Indian reserve in the Cassiar Country of the Northern Interior of British Columbia, Canada. It is located on the left bank of the river of the same name at that river's confluence with the Dease River and is under the administration of the Liard First Nation, a member of the Kaska Tribal Council.
