= Frog River =

River in British Columbia, Canada

Coordinates: 58.5047°N 126.8678°W

The Frog River is a tributary of the Kechika River in Northern British Columbia, Canada.

The river originates from the Frog Lakes, and goes on to Dune Za Keyih Provincial Park and Protected Area, and acts as the border of the park for an extended area of land. The river then feeds into the Kechika River.
