= Little Blue River =

The Little Blue River is the name of several rivers:

- Little Blue River (Indiana), a tributary of Big Blue River (Indiana)
- Little Blue River (Kansas/Nebraska)
- Little Blue River (Missouri)

== See also ==
- Big Blue River (disambiguation)
- Blue River (disambiguation)
