= Big Blue River Bridge =

Big Blue River Bridge may refer to:

- Big Blue River Bridge (Grafton, Nebraska), listed on the National Register of Historic Places in Fillmore County, Nebraska
- Big Blue River Bridge (Surprise, Nebraska), listed on the National Register of Historic Places in Butler County, Nebraska

== See also ==
- Big Blue River (disambiguation)
