= John McLeod (explorer) =

Scottish-born explorer of Canada

John McLeod (1795 – after 1842) was a Scottish-born explorer of Canada, in his capacity as a fur trader with the North West Company and Hudson's Bay Company. He was born at Valtos, Lochs in the Isle of Lewis. He is remembered primarily for his explorations of several major rivers of the southwestern Northwest Territories, southern Yukon Territory, and northern British Columbia.

== Fur Trade ==
McLeod arrived in Montreal, headquarters of the North West Company, in 1816. From there, he was assigned to the Churchill River area as a clerk. Following the merger of the two fur trading companies in 1821, McLeod served at various posts in the Athabasca and Mackenzie River Districts of the Hudson's Bay Company. In 1823, McLeod was assigned as manager of the Fort Simpson fur trading post, located at the junction of the Liard and Mackenzie Rivers, where he would remain nine years as deputy to the Chief Trader. In 1823-24, McLeod completed explorations of nine mountain ranges adjacent to the South Nahanni River, during which he opened trading relations with the Kaska First Nation.

McLeod's most important expedition took place in the summer of 1831. Leaving Fort Simpson on 28 June 1831, McLeod and eight others became the first known Europeans to ascend the Liard River, a major tributary of the Mackenzie River. This expedition also included a partial ascent of the Dease River and ascent of Frances River to Frances Lake (which McLeod mistook for the main branch of the Liard). In sum, McLeod's expedition covered close to 1000 km, and established contact with five First Nations.

Following this trip, Governor George Simpson briefly transferred McLeod to the Montreal Department, and then back to the Mackenzie River District. He was named Chief Trader of Fort Halkett, located near the junction of the Liard and Coal Rivers in 1834. From there, McLeod undertook a second expedition up the Liard as far as the Dease, ascending the Dease to Dease Lake. Journeying over the Arctic-Pacific divide, McLeod also partially descended the Stikine River, encountering coastal First Nations tribes, engaged in trading with the Russians.

After a brief stint at Fort Liard, NWT, McLeod was transferred to Fort Vancouver in the Columbia District in 1835. While there, he undertook a number of assignments, including negotiations with American and Russian fur trading interests. These travels took him as far afield as Northern California and Wyoming.

== Later life ==
After twenty-six years as a fur trader in far-flung remote regions of the continent, the forty-seven-year-old McLeod retired from the Hudson's Bay Company in 1842 and returned to Great Britain. He spent the rest of his life back in Lewis, where he took over the management of the farm of Valtos, Lochs from his father, Hector Macleod.

== Legacy ==
Mount McLeod, west of Dease Lake, British Columbia, is named for him.
