= Kaska Tribal Council =

The Kaska Dena Council is a tribal council formed of five band governments of the Kaska Dena people in northern British Columbia, Yukon Territory, and Northwest Territories, Canada.

== Member governments ==
The five member governments are the:

- Daylu Dena Council
- Dease River First Nation (official name simply "Dease River"), offices at Good Hope Lake, British Columbia
- Kwadacha First Nation
- Liard First Nation, offices in Watson Lake, Yukon but including reserves in British Columbia
- Ross River Dena Council, offices in Ross River, Yukon

== See also ==
- Tahltan First Nation
- List of tribal councils in British Columbia
