= Blue River Township, Indiana =

Blue River Township is the name of four townships in Indiana:

- Blue River Township, Hancock County, Indiana
- Blue River Township, Harrison County, Indiana
- Blue River Township, Henry County, Indiana
- Blue River Township, Johnson County, Indiana

== See also ==
- Blue River (disambiguation)
