= Harry McDame =

Bahamian gold prospector

Henry "Harry" McDame (c. 1826 – c. 1900) was a Bahamas-born prospector in the California and British Columbia gold rushes.

== Biography ==
He arrived in the Colony of British Columbia in 1858, along with many other black people from California encouraged to move to the colony by Governor James Douglas, and took up land near modern-day Quesnel. He and his neighbour at Quensellemouthe, Robert Giscome, explored and established a major route to the Peace River Gold Rush at what became known as Giscome Portage, connecting the northern bend of the Fraser River with the Parsnip River, thereby connecting the Fort George area to the Peace and, by a roundabout route, to the Omineca River goldfields. They explored the Peace, Nation and Smoky Rivers, as reported in a column in the British Colonist, December 15, 1863. They prospected on Germansen Creek in the Omineca area in 1870, but in 1874, like thousands of others, went to the Cassiar Country following reports of rich gold deposits around Dease Lake.

McDame and Giscome, with other partners, formed the Discovery Company and staked on what became known as McDame's Creek (McDame Creek today). British Columbia Mines Reports for 1874 for this area, by Gold Commissioner J.H. Sullivan, comment "I learn that a new creek has been discovered...now known as McDame's Creek [...] Within 30 days they had extracted gold valued at $6000" (approx. $250,000 today). In 1877, McDame Creek was the location of the find of a gold nugget weighing 72 ounces, worth $1,300 at the time (≈$52,000 today) and which is the largest nugget found in British Columbia's history. McDame mined with his partners in this area until the early 1880s, when McDame returned to the Omineca, discovering gold on Lorne Creek in 1884. He broke later in the year and wound up in a hospital in Victoria, British Columbia. He returned to the Omineca after his recovery, staking with a new partner, Sam Booth, and died in that region some time before 1901.

== Legacy ==
In addition to McDame Creek, also named for him was McDame, originally known as McDame Post or McDame's Creek Post, which was sold to the Hudson's Bay Company in 1875 and has also been known as Fort McDame. McDames Creek Indian Reserve No.2 is located in the same area and is named for the creek, which in the Kaska language is known as Kasha (the source word for the term "Cassiar", referring to fibrous rock—or a crow).

McDame also prospected in other areas, such as the Skeena, which was another route to both the Omineca and Cassiar gold districts; there he conferred a few placenames including Chimdemash Creek, the meaning of which is not known.
