= Ross River Dena Council =

The Ross River Dena Council is a First Nation in the eastern Yukon Territory in Canada. Its main centre is in Ross River, Yukon at the junction of the Campbell Highway and the Canol Road, near the confluence of the Pelly River and the Ross River. The language originally spoken by the people of this First Nation was mainly Kaska, although a number of the First Nation's citizens are Slavey speakers. The First Nation, which has 483 registered members, is a member of the Kaska Tribal Council which is pursuing land claims in the Yukon and northern British Columbia.
