= Kechika River =

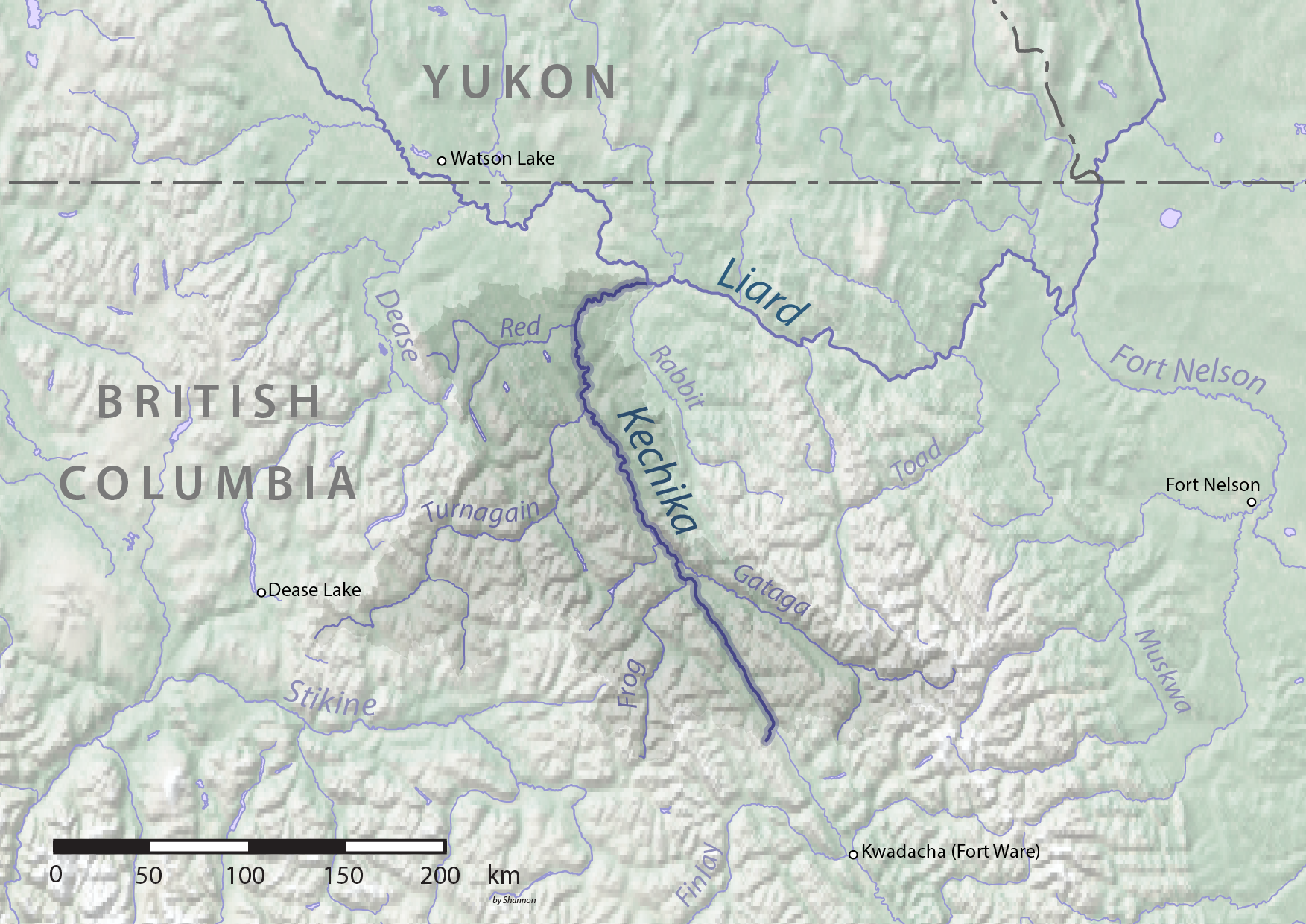
- Map of the Kechika River drainage basin

- Location of the mouth of the Kechika River in British Columbia
- Native name: Tahdazeh' (Kaska); Tah Chow Gàh (Sekani)

Location
- Country: Canada
- Province: British Columbia
- District: Cassiar Land District

Physical characteristics
- Source: Sifton Ranges
  - coordinates: 57°51′41″N 126°18′09″W
  - elevation: 2,000 m (6,600 ft)
- Mouth: Liard River
  - location: near Fireside, British Columbia
  - coordinates: 59°37′33″N 127°08′38″W
  - elevation: 485 m (1,591 ft)
- Length: 300 km (190 mi)
- Basin size: 22,700 km^{2} (8,800 mi^{2})
- Discharge
  - location: Confluence with Liard River
  - average: 244.75 m^{3}/s (8,643 cu ft/s)
  - minimum: 26.5 m^{3}/s (940 cu ft/s)
  - maximum: 1,250 m^{3}/s (44,000 cu ft/s)

The Kechika River is a tributary of the Liard River, about 300 kilometres (190 mi) long, in northern British Columbia, Canada. The Kechika flows generally northwest through the northernmost section of the Rocky Mountain Trench before turning east to join the Liard, a major branch of the Mackenzie River system. The river's 22,700 km^{2} (8,800 mi^{2}) drainage basin is characterized by high glaciated peaks, boreal forest, and open tundra. With no settlements, roads or dams along its course, the Kechika is considered "one of British Columbia's finest examples of wilderness and undisturbed wildlife habitat."

Inhabited for thousands of years by the Kaska Dena, the Kechika was explored by fur traders in the 1800s and was one of the routes to gold strikes in the Yukon. The difficulty of accessing the remote Kechika country made it an unappealing location for European settlement. Today, the Kechika River basin includes a number of large parks and protected areas, most of which are administered under the umbrella of the Muskwa-Kechika Management Area, which includes almost the entire Kechika basin and parts of several adjacent river systems.

== Geography ==
The Kechika River begins more than 2,000 metres (6,600 ft) above sea level in the Sifton Ranges about 5 km (3.1 mi) south of Mount Slocomb. It flows north to the Rocky Mountain Trench at Sifton Pass, which marks the divide between the drainage basins of the Kechika and the Fox River, which flows southeast along the Trench into the Finlay River. The Kechika turns northwest down the Rocky Mountain Trench and flows through Dune Za Keyih Provincial Park and Protected Area, where it receives the Frog River from the west and the Gataga River from the east. Further downstream, it receives its largest tributary, the Turnagain River, from the west, then the Red River also from the west. After the Red River confluence the Kechika turns to the northeast and flows into the Liard River near the unincorporated community of Fireside, about 100 kilometres (62 mi) southeast of Watson Lake, Yukon and 250 kilometres (160 mi) northwest of Fort Nelson, BC.

The Kechika drainage basin includes about 22,700 square kilometres (8,800 mi^{2}) in BC's Stikine Region and Northern Rockies Regional Municipality. The main Kechika River valley sits between the Muskwa Ranges (part of the northern Rocky Mountains) to the east, and the Sifton, Thudaka and Kechika Ranges (all part of the greater Cassiar Mountains) to the west. The Cassiar Mountains in this area are higher than the Rockies and are extensively glaciated. The Turnagain River drains an area west of the Kechika Ranges, stretching as far as the Three Sisters Range at the edge of the Stikine Plateau. The southern part of the Kechika basin is mountainous, while the northern part, extending into the Liard Plain, is characterized by rolling hills and muskegs. The Kechika basin is bordered by the drainage basins of the Dease River to the west and the Rabbit, Toad and Fort Nelson Rivers to the east, all tributaries of the Liard. To the south are the basins of the Stikine River, which flows into the Pacific Ocean, and the Finlay River, which flows into the Mackenzie via the Peace and Slave Rivers.

=== Discharge ===
The primary source of water for the Kechika River is snowmelt, although there are also a few small glaciers that contribute water to the river. A stream gauge operated by Water Survey of Canada recorded discharge data at the mouth of the Kechika River from 1962 to 1995. The gauge recorded a mean annual flow of 244.75 m^{3}/s (8,643 cu ft/s). Mean monthly flows range from a high of 768.18 m^{3}/s (27,128 cu ft/s) in June to a low of 48.44 m^{3}/s (1,711 cu ft/s) in February. The highest flow month on record was June 1964, at 1,250 m^{3}/s (44,000 cu ft/s), and the lowest was March 1972, at 26.5 m^{3}/s (940 cu ft/s). The highest flow year was 1974, with an annual mean of 280.24 m^{3}/s (9,897 cu ft/s), and the lowest was 1978, with an annual mean of 180.05 m^{3}/s (6,358 cu ft/s).

Kechika River monthly mean discharge at Liard River (m^{3}/s)

== History ==
The Kechika River is within the traditional lands of the Kaska Dena people, whose ancestors have lived in the area for about 4,500 years. Although the Kechika is more navigable than most rivers in the northern Rockies, the Kaska traveled along the river via trails rather than canoes. The Kechika River valley was used for hunting, fishing and trapping (particularly for beaver), with major camps near the Kechika-Turnagain confluence, Graveyard Lake and Aeroplane Lake. The river is Tadahzeh', "long inclining river", in the Kaska language. In the 19th century, the Sekani people were displaced west into the Rocky Mountain Trench as a result of First Nation territorial changes during the fur trade. In the Sekani language the river is Tah Chow Gàh, ("big windy" or "windy valley"). The Altse Dene Tunna or Davie Trail historically ran up the Kechika River valley, connecting Kwadacha, on the Finlay River, with Lower Post, at the confluence of the Liard and Dease Rivers. The trail is named after Old Davie, a half-Sekani prophet who became known as a liaison between local tribes and European explorers.

The first white man to reach the Kechika River basin was Hudson's Bay Company (HBC) fur trader Samuel Black, who in 1824 ascended the Finlay River scouting northern BC for a route westward to the Pacific Ocean. At the confluence of the Fox River with the Finlay he noted "it heads at a pass two days' travel northward, whence a river flows northward into the Liard." Black never saw this northward-flowing river (which would be the Kechika), instead heading west into the Stikine Country and turning back at a stream that he named the Turnagain River, which flows northeast into the Kechika. In 1831, HBC trader John McLeod ascended the Liard River and in passing by the mouth of the Kechika River, correctly guessed that it was the outlet of what Black had called the Turnagain River, and so named the stream "Black's River".

The 1873 Cassiar Gold Rush was centered on a tributary of the Turnagain, the Cassiar River. Between 1873 and 1886, prospectors explored large areas of the Turnagain and upper Kechika River basins. Although the area is rich in minerals, no mines were ever developed along the Kechika River corridor. Minerals documented in the Muskwa-Kechika Management Area include "copper, lead, zinc, silver, barite, gold, tungsten, chalcopyrite, pyrite, dolomite, quartz crystals, malachite, aragonite, mica and azurite." Fur trappers and prospectors of the 1800s often called the Kechika River the "Muddy River" or "Big Muddy River" due to the heavy silt loads the river brought down in floods.

In 1898 the Klondike Gold Rush spurred interest in finding a route from Alberta to the Yukon. Inspector J.D. Moodie of the North West Mounted Police (NWMP) explored the Kechika valley as a potential route for prospectors traveling from Edmonton, Alberta. Hedley (1941) called Moodie's report "the first authoritative description of the region". Moodie's route followed the Peace River to Fort Ware (Kwadacha) and then followed the old Davie Trail through the Kechika valley up towards the Yukon. The "Old Moodie Trail" was considered one of the most difficult routes to the Klondike gold fields, compared to sea routes starting in Victoria, British Columbia and landing in northern BC or Alaska, and only a few prospectors successfully completed the trip. In 1900 a cattle drive to the Yukon was attempted via this trail from Vanderhoof, British Columbia and in 1905 the BC government attempted to improve the trail, though the effort was abandoned in 1907 due to high costs.

Moodie recorded the name as "Ta-ta-chi-ca" during his explorations of the region and later produced a map labeling the river as "Kachika". In 1914 Major E.B. Hart of the Royal Geographical Society noted that the inhabitants of the area pronounced the river with an 'e' rather than an 'a' sound and proposed the spelling "Kechika", which was officially adopted by the BC Geographic Division on March 3, 1925. However, as late as 1949 the river was still colloquially known as "Big Muddy".

In 1939, John Ogilvie "Skook" Davidson, a northern BC packer and guide, settled in the Kechika River valley and established Diamond J Ranch. For more than thirty years Davidson supported packing expeditions for geology and survey crews, as well as guiding hunting expeditions. Davidson helped scout the route for the Alaska Highway, which was built past the Kechika–Liard confluence in the 1940s, and helped transport supplies for construction crews. The confluence of the Kechika with the Liard, where supplies were offloaded from boats on the latter river, became known as Skook's Landing. In 1970, Davidson retired to Vancouver after a fire destroyed the ranch. Skooks Landing is still regularly used by hunters to access the Kechika River, particularly during the elk season in September.

In 1996, the Kechika River was designated a BC Heritage River along with two of its tributaries, the Gataga River and Frog River.

== Ecology and protected areas ==
Almost the entire Kechika River basin is within the western part of the Muskwa-Kechika Management Area (M-KMA), which includes four of fourteen biogeoclimatic zones in British Columbia. The Alpine Tundra zone, consisting mainly of shrubs, grasses mosses and lichens, occupies elevations higher than 1,400 metres (4,600 ft). Mid-elevations are occupied by the Spruce-Willow-Birch and Engelmann Spruce-Subalpine Fir zones, where the dominant trees are white spruce and subalpine fir, with Engelmann spruce frequently found along steeper, more rugged slopes. The lower valleys are part of the Boreal White and Black Spruce zone, which is dominated by white and black spruce, paper birch and subalpine fir. In addition, muskeg flats are common in the northern half of the basin. The wide, open valleys of the Kechika and its tributaries are home to an abundance of wildlife including moose, caribou, Stone sheep, mountain goat, grizzly bear, black bear, wolf and elk.

In 2000 BC's Land and Resource Management Plan identified the Kechika River for "special protection of its natural, cultural heritage and recreation values", and the lower part of the river has been designated "a special resource management zone, with particular commitments to protection of visual qualities, protection of wildlife habitat, and the sustained opportunities for recreation." The 63,000 km^{2} (24,000 mi^{2}) M-KMA was established in 1998 to oversee land use in the region of the Kechika River and Muskwa River. About 98 percent of the M-KMA is roadless, making it one of the largest intact wilderness areas in the world. Eleven protected areas, including provincial parks and wilderness, account for 27 percent of the M-KMA while the remainder is in Special Management Areas that regulate the type and intensity of allowed development. Dune Za Keyih Provincial Park and Protected Area, which encompasses 3,468 square kilometres (1,339 mi^{2}) of the Kechika River basin, was first proposed in the 1970s but was not formally established until 2001.

== Recreation ==
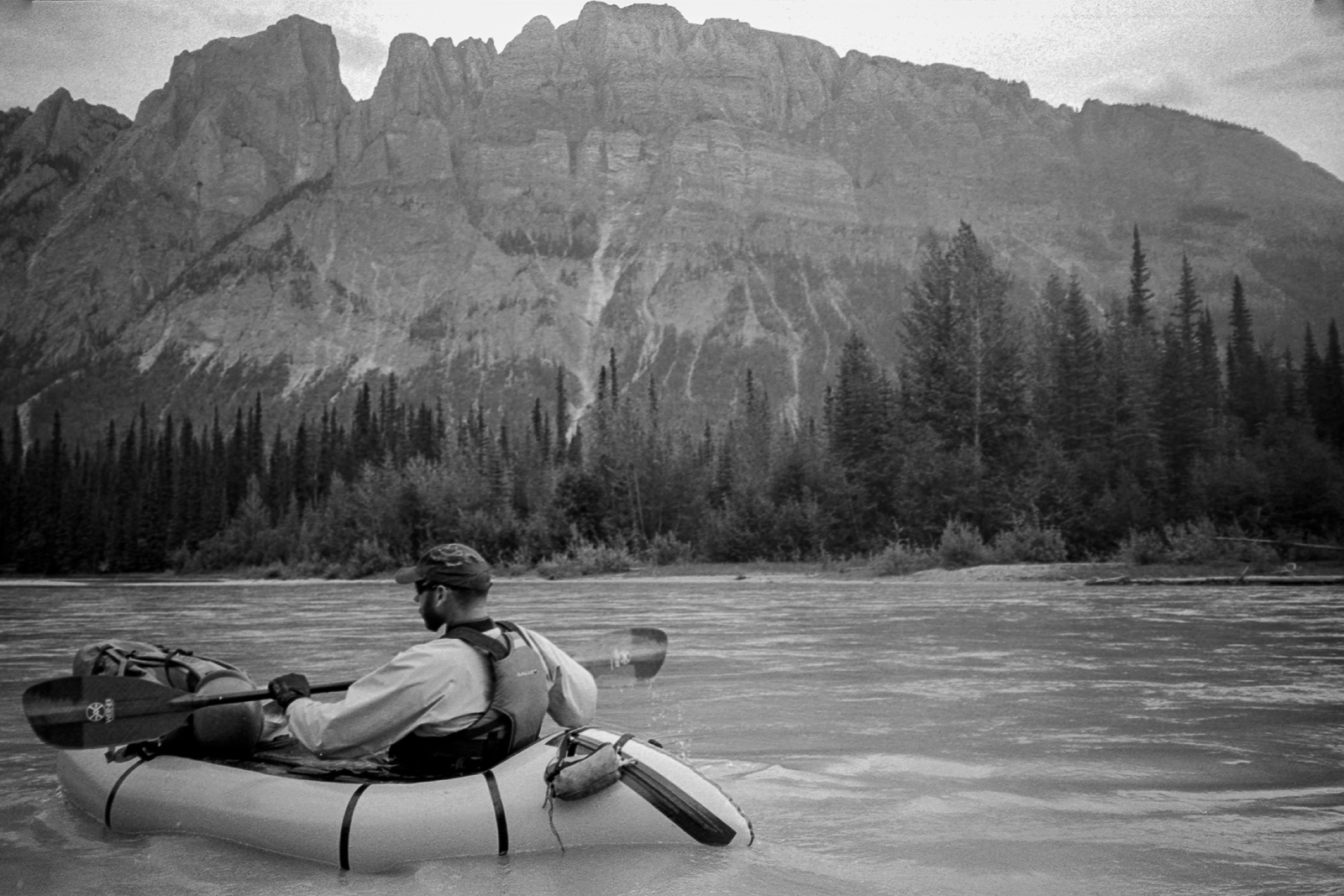
Rafting on the Gataga River, a tributary of the Kechika River

Recreational activities along the river include hunting, hiking, horseback riding, boating, wildlife viewing, fishing, and caving. Most of the Kechika River basin is extremely remote, with the closest road access being the Alaska Highway on the opposite side of the Liard from the mouth of the Kechika. A number of local guides and outfitters provide tours of the area. Floatplanes or helicopters can be used to access the interior, which otherwise takes days to reach by foot or on horseback. The Kechika can sometimes be navigated by jetboat from its mouth to Dune Za Keyih Park, but is often blocked by log jams. Backcountry survival skills are essential for travel in the Kechika River country, as there are no developed trails, campsites or settlements. The Kaska tribe has considered improving the old Davie Trail to provide better recreational access to the region.

== See also ==
- List of rivers of British Columbia

== Works cited ==
- Archer, Laurel (2011). Northern British Columbia Canoe Trips. Rocky Mountain Books. ISBN 9781897522691.
- Berton, Pierre (2001). Klondike: The Last Great Gold Rush, 1896-1899. Doubleday Canada. ISBN 9780385658447.
- Karamanski, Theodore J. (1983). Fur Trade and Exploration: Opening the Far Northwest, 1821-1852. University of Oklahoma Press. ISBN 9780806120935.
- Patterson, R.M. (2011). Finlay's River. Touchwood Editions. ISBN 9781926971155.
- Wonders, William C. (1994). Alaska Highway Explorer: Place Names Along the Adventure Road. Horsdal & Schubart Publishers. ISBN 9780920663288.
