= Turnagain River =

- Location within British Columbia

Location
- Country: Canada
- Province: British Columbia

Physical characteristics
- Source: Turnagain Lake
  - location: Kitimat–Stikine
  - coordinates: 58°16′40″N 129°10′08″W
  - elevation: 1,070 m (3,510 ft)
- Mouth: Kechika River
  - location: Chee House, Stikine Region
  - coordinates: 59°9′11″N 127°35′55″W
  - elevation: 583 m (1,913 ft)
- Basin size: 6,580 km^{2} (2,540 sq mi)
- Discharge
  - location: Above Sandpile Creek
  - average: 87.6 m^{3}/s (3,090 cu ft/s)
  - minimum: 5.85 m^{3}/s (207 cu ft/s)
  - maximum: 444 m^{3}/s (15,700 cu ft/s)

Basin features
- Progression: Turnagain→ Kechika→ Liard→ Mackenzie→ Arctic Ocean

The Turnagain River is a river in the Canadian province of British Columbia. It is a tributary of the Kechika River.

It was named the Turn-Again River by Samuel Black of the Hudson's Bay Company, who in 1824 journeyed to the river before turning back. It was also known as Black River and Little Muddy River before its current name was adopted on 1 June 1937. Its name in the Kaska language is Gacho.

The Hudson's Bay Company (HBC) operated a trading post (also known as Lower Post) on the river from 1888 to 1892, when the HBC sold off all its interests in the Cassiar District. It reacquired the post in summer 1897, but shut it down again two years later due to poor returns and the re-establishment of Fort Nelson.

== Geography ==
The Turnagain River starts at Turnagain Lake, and flows generally east and north before joining the Kechika River. The Kechika River is a tributary of the Liard River, which is in turn tributary to the Mackenzie River, which empties into the Arctic Ocean. A notable tributary is the Cassiar River, which flows north to joins the Turnagain southeast of Cry Lake and which was the focus of the Cassiar Gold Rush of the 1870s. Other major tributaries are the Major Hart River and the Dall River.

Part of the river flows through the Muskwa-Kechika Management Area.

== See also ==
- List of rivers of British Columbia
