= 2021 Faro, Yukon shootings =

Mass shooting in Canada

2021 Faro, Yukon Shootings
- Location: 62.2285°N 133.3532°W; Faro, Yukon, Canada
- Date: October 26, 2021; 5 years ago 2:02 PM – 5:00 p.m. CST (UTC−06:00)
- Target: Citizens of Faro, Yukon
- Attack type: Mass shooting, Spree shooting
- Weapons: .45-caliber semi-automatic handgun; .300-caliber Remington rifle
- Deaths: 2
- Injuries: 1
- Perpetrator: Ralph Bernard Shaw

On October 26, 2021, Ralph Shaw shot and killed two people and critically injured another in the town of Faro, in Canada's Yukon Territory.

The Royal Canadian Mounted Police were first alerted to the Faro in order to solve a case of Domestic violence but were then called after residents heard gunfire. On 4:57 PM, RCMP officials placed the entire town into lockdown, eventually rescinding the order after 5:29 PM, issuing a statement to locals that they would still maintain a heavy presence in Faro. After numerous door-to-door visits the RCMP confirmed that two people, 73 year old town councilor Patrick McCracken and Shaw's 42-year old estranged wife, Saenduean Honchaiyaphum were killed. One man was critically injured.

Jack Bowers, who was meant to be sworn in as the town's new mayor that day, had his date of swearing-in postponed in response. Yukon Premier Sandy Silver condemned the murders that afternoon.
