= Faro, Yukon =

Town in the territory of Yukon, Canada

Faro
- Town
- Town of Faro
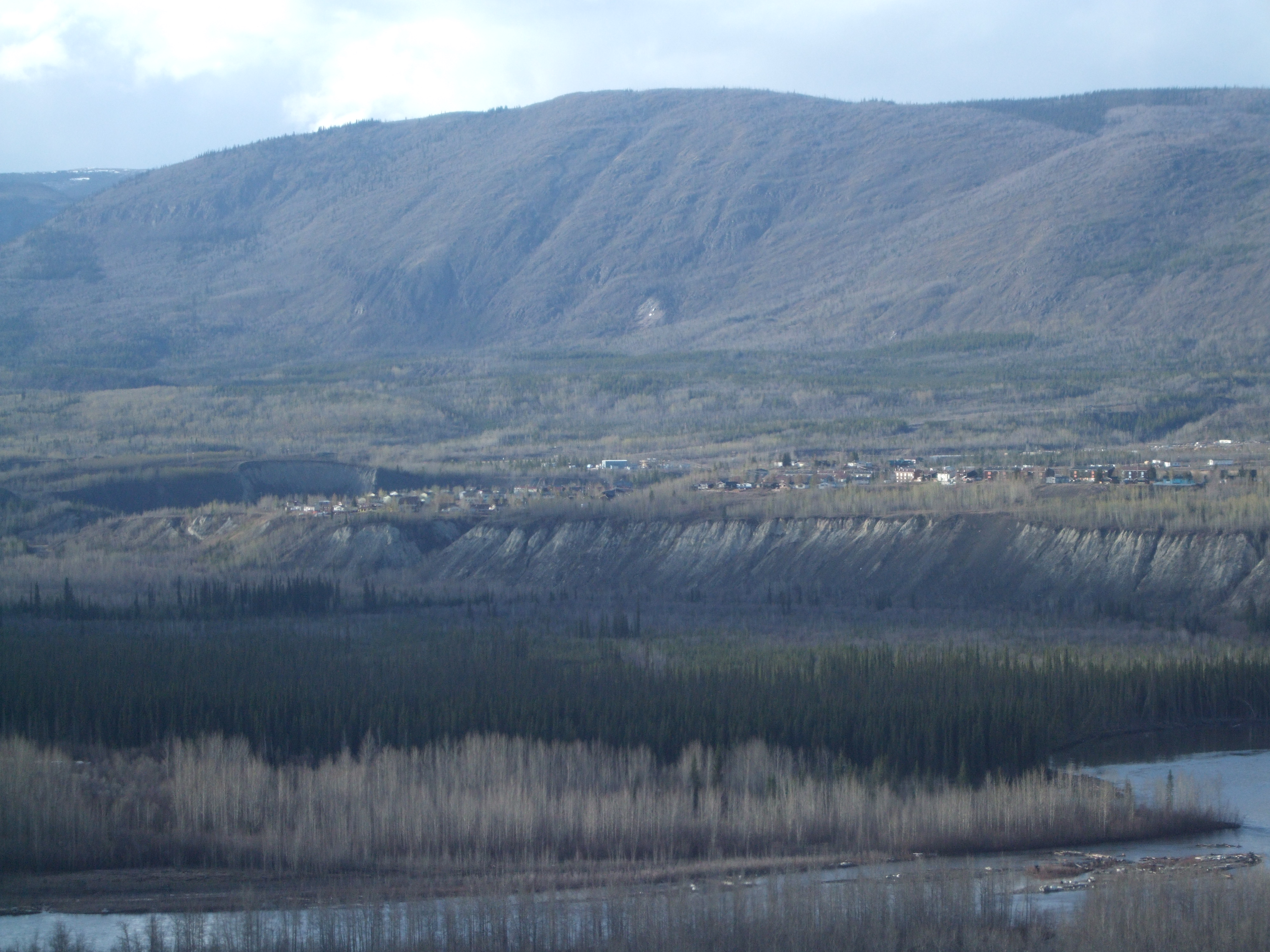
- Faro and Pelly River

- Location within Yukon Location within Canada
- Coordinates: 62°13′35″N 133°21′21″W
- Country: Canada
- Territory: Yukon

Area (2021)
  - Land: 199.89 km^{2} (77.18 sq mi)
- Elevation At airport: 720 m (2,350 ft)

Population (2021)
  - Total: 440
  - Density: 2.2/km^{2} (5.7/sq mi)
  - Change 2016–21: ▲26.4%
- Demonym: Faroite
- Time zone: UTC– 07:00 (MST)
- Climate: Dfc
- Website: Official website

Faro is a town in central Yukon, Canada, the home of the now abandoned Faro Mine. It was the largest open-pit lead–zinc mine in the world as well as a significant producer of silver and other natural resources. The mine was originally established by Cyprus Anvil Mining Corporation in 1969 and subsequently switched hands to Curragh Resources but due to low metal prices they went bankrupt. Anvil Range Mining then took over the mine from 1995–1997 and then in 1998 Faro Mine was abandoned. The site is now in active remediation with the project being led by the Ralph M. Parsons Construction Company of the United States with General Enterprises Ltd. of Whitehorse being the main subcontractor. As of 2021, the population is 440, down from its peak population of 1,652 in 1981. Faro was named after the card game of the same name.

As these industries have declined over the past decade, Faro is attempting to attract ecotourism to the region to view such animals as Dall sheep and Stone sheep. Several viewing platforms have been constructed in and around the town.

One unusual feature of Faro is that it has a golf course running through the main part of town.

== History ==
The area was prospected in the 1950s and 1960s by Al Kulan, credited with discovering several significant deposits of lead and zinc ore and playing a major role in the discovery of the Faro Mine, which became Canada's largest lead–zinc mine. The Cyprus Anvil Mining Corporation established the first operations to mine the deposits, and established the town of Faro. A new highway was built between Carmacks and Ross River to serve the Faro area – initially numbered Highway 9, it is today part of the Robert Campbell Highway, Yukon Highway 4. A forest fire in 1969 destroyed the newly built homes, which had to be re-built.

On 26 October 2021, two people were killed and another critically injured in an active shooter situation in Faro. A suspect, identified as a local resident, was taken into custody by police and charged with two counts each of first-degree murder, attempted murder, and aggravated assault. Flags were lowered to half-mast in Whitehorse and Dawson City in response to the killings.

== Demographics ==
Federal census population history of Faro
Year	Pop.	±%
1971	863	—
1976	1,544	+78.9%
1981	1,652	+7.0%
1986	400	−75.8%
1991	1,221	+205.3%
1996	1,261	+3.3%
2001	313	−75.2%
2006	341	+8.9%
2011	344	+0.9%
2016	348	+1.2%
2021	440	+26.4%
Source: Statistics Canada

In the 2021 Canadian census conducted by Statistics Canada, Faro had a population of 440 living in 210 of its 423 total private dwellings, a change of 26.4% from its 2016 population of 348. With a land area of 199.89 km^{2} (77.18 sq mi), it had a population density of 2.2/km^{2} (5.7/sq mi) in 2021.

- Mother tongue (2021):
  - Official languages
    - English as first language: 81.8%
    - French as first language: 8.0%
    - English and French as first language: 1.1%
    - English and non-official language(s) as first language: 1.1%
  - Indigenous Canadian languages
    - Kaska as first language: 1.1%
  - Other languages of Canada
    - German as first language: 2.3%
    - Tagalog as first language: 2.3%
    - Slavic languages as first language: 1.1%
    - Punjabi as first language: 1.1%

== Economy ==
=== Faro Mine ===
Faro Mine was once the largest open-pit lead–zinc mine in the world. Today, it is the site of one of the most complex abandoned mine remediation projects in Canada. The mine spans 25 km^{2}, an area roughly the size of the city of Victoria, British Columbia.

— Faro Mine Remediation Project: Yukon

The mine was opened by the Cyprus Anvil Mining Corporation in 1969, which was formed to mine the deposit. From the late 1960s until 1982 the mine was one of the largest lead-zinc mines in the world. At one time it was the largest open-pit mine in the world. During its history, 320 million tonnes of waste rock was removed to reach the ore. The mine remained in more-or-less constant production until 1982. Trucks carried the ore concentrate from the mill by highway to Whitehorse, where the buckets were lifted from the trucks and lowered onto cars of the White Pass and Yukon Route railway. The trains took the buckets another 170 km (110 mi) to Skagway, Alaska, where the contents were poured out into the holds of ships.

During those years, Cyprus Anvil was purchased by Dome Petroleum. World prices for metals fell in 1982, and the mine owners announced in May a two-month halt to production starting in June, 1982. In July, the mine owners extended the shutdown to four months. In September, the owners announced that the shutdown would be indefinite. The shock to the Yukon economy, where the mine produced approximately 40% of territorial GDP, was enormous. With government assistance an 18-month waste-rock stripping program was operated in 1983 and 1984. Curragh Resources purchased the property in 1985 and production resumed in 1986. This time, ore was trucked in ore pots from Faro directly to Skagway, bypassing the railway. This operation ended in 1993, not long after Curragh Resources suffered a coal mining disaster at the Westray Mine in Plymouth, Pictou County, Nova Scotia. A third operation, by the Anvil Range Mining Corporation, opened in 1995 and ceased production in January 1998, followed by the bankruptcy of Anvil Range. Much of the heavy mining and milling equipment was sold and removed from the Yukon.

Any prospect for further mining of the lead–zinc resource would now require significant investment to bring in mining equipment, and it would need to come entirely by road unless a British Columbia–Alaska railway is built or the White Pass route is reopened to freight traffic to Whitehorse. Cost of clean-up is estimated at close to a billion dollars.

When the mine closed it left 70 million tonnes of tailings and 320 million tonnes of waste rock that require remediation to protect the health of humans, land, water, and wildlife. With the bankruptcy of Anvil Range the clean up bill for the mine and tailings pond fell to the federal government. Early estimates put the cost at $450–590 million over 40 years. In 2016 the federal treasury reported that between $250 million and $350 million had been spent maintaining the mine site, without starting clean-up. The $40 million annual costs are to run pumps to prevent the tailings from breaching the dams and the construction and operations of three water treatment plants. The clean-up itself could cost a further $1 billion.

In a report by the Canadian Broadcasting Corporation in 2017, the Canadian government stated that they were prepared to embark on the remediation process of the Faro Mine. The concerns listed by federal officials include the leaching of toxic metals into the Pelly and Yukon rivers as the acidic rock drainage worsens over time. The remediation work will include rerouting regional creeks to avoid tailings and waste rock areas, treating contaminated water, and avoiding clean water from becoming contaminated.

== Infrastructure ==
The town is served by the Faro Airport and the Robert Campbell Highway passes through just south of Faro.

== Geography ==
=== Climate ===
Faro has a subarctic climate (Köppen Dfc) with mild summers and severely cold winters. Extreme seasonal swings are common, although less severe than farther east in Canada due to the warm spells in summers and occasional mild spells in winter.

The coldest temperature recorded in Faro was −52 °C (–61.6 °F) on 7 December 1977 and 22 December 2025. The previously mentioned temperature was surpassed by a new record temperature of −52.5 °C (−62.5 °F), recorded on 23 December 2025.

Climate data for Faro (Faro Airport) Climate ID: 2100517; coordinates 62°12′25″N 133°22′24″W; elevation: 716.3 m (2,350 ft); 1981–2010 normals
Month	Jan	Feb	Mar	Apr	May	Jun	Jul	Aug	Sep	Oct	Nov	Dec	Year
Record high humidex	5.4	10.8	11.4	19.6	29.7	35.4	33.9	32.8	23.9	17.8	12.0	11.7	35.4
Record high °C (°F)	7.0 (44.6)	12.1 (53.8)	12.5 (54.5)	21.5 (70.7)	32.0 (89.6)	33.8 (92.8)	31.0 (87.8)	33.9 (93.0)	24.0 (75.2)	18.5 (65.3)	12.5 (54.5)	12.5 (54.5)	33.9 (93.0)
Mean daily maximum °C (°F)	−16.0 (3.2)	−10.3 (13.5)	−2.1 (28.2)	6.8 (44.2)	13.8 (56.8)	19.6 (67.3)	21.0 (69.8)	18.4 (65.1)	11.5 (52.7)	1.7 (35.1)	−11.1 (12.0)	−13.8 (7.2)	3.3 (37.9)
Daily mean °C (°F)	−20.1 (−4.2)	−15.5 (4.1)	−8.6 (16.5)	0.6 (33.1)	7.5 (45.5)	13.2 (55.8)	15.0 (59.0)	12.4 (54.3)	6.4 (43.5)	−2.0 (28.4)	−14.8 (5.4)	−17.9 (−0.2)	−2.0 (28.4)
Mean daily minimum °C (°F)	−24.6 (−12.3)	−20.7 (−5.3)	−15.0 (5.0)	−5.5 (22.1)	1.2 (34.2)	6.8 (44.2)	8.9 (48.0)	6.3 (43.3)	1.3 (34.3)	−5.7 (21.7)	−18.5 (−1.3)	−22.3 (−8.1)	−7.3 (18.9)
Record low °C (°F)	−51.0 (−59.8)	−51.0 (−59.8)	−44.0 (−47.2)	−30.5 (−22.9)	−8.0 (17.6)	−2.5 (27.5)	0.0 (32.0)	−4.5 (23.9)	−15.5 (4.1)	−34.0 (−29.2)	−46.0 (−50.8)	−52.5 (−62.5)	−52.5 (−62.5)
Record low wind chill	−59.1	−58.9	−53.1	−34.2	−16.4	0.0	0.0	−2.4	−13.0	−30.4	−58.3	−60.0	−60.0
Average precipitation mm (inches)	14.6 (0.57)	12.3 (0.48)	12.3 (0.48)	8.7 (0.34)	27.9 (1.10)	36.7 (1.44)	56.1 (2.21)	48.2 (1.90)	41.0 (1.61)	27.3 (1.07)	19.4 (0.76)	15.2 (0.60)	319.7 (12.59)
Average rainfall mm (inches)	0.0 (0.0)	0.0 (0.0)	0.1 (0.00)	2.6 (0.10)	27.3 (1.07)	36.7 (1.44)	56.1 (2.21)	47.5 (1.87)	38.4 (1.51)	9.4 (0.37)	0.2 (0.01)	0.1 (0.00)	218.4 (8.60)
Average snowfall cm (inches)	16.7 (6.6)	14.6 (5.7)	13.1 (5.2)	6.3 (2.5)	0.6 (0.2)	0.0 (0.0)	0.0 (0.0)	0.7 (0.3)	2.4 (0.9)	20.4 (8.0)	21.7 (8.5)	17.6 (6.9)	114.0 (44.9)
Average precipitation days (≥ 0.2 mm)	10.7	8.6	7.3	5.3	11.6	12.7	17.7	15.2	15.2	13.9	12.5	10.8	141.4
Average rainy days (≥ 0.2 mm)	0.0	0.0	0.1	1.5	11.2	12.7	17.7	15.0	14.2	5.0	0.2	0.1	77.8
Average snowy days (≥ 0.2 cm)	11.1	8.9	7.4	4.0	0.6	0.0	0.0	0.2	1.4	9.5	12.9	11.4	67.4
Average relative humidity (%)	79.2	71.9	54.8	—	—	41.4	47.9	50.4	55.4	63.7	81.2	81.0	62.7
Source: Environment Canada Canadian Climate Normals 1981–2010

== People connected with Faro ==
- Lorne Greene, famous for his work in Bonanza and Lorne Greene's New Wilderness, narrated a film about Faro called A New World in the Yukon.
- The digital artist Astra Zero grew up in Faro

== See also ==
- List of municipalities in Yukon
- Canadian Mining Hall of Fame
