= Big Blue River =

Big Blue River may refer to:

- Big Blue River (Indiana)
- Big Blue River (Kansas River tributary), flows through Nebraska and Kansas
- Blue River (Missouri River tributary), or Big Blue River, flows through Kansas and Missouri

== See also ==
- Big Blue River Bridge (disambiguation)
- Little Blue River (disambiguation)
- Blue River (disambiguation)
