= Dease River First Nation =

First Nation in the Northern BC Interior

The Dease River First Nation, also known as the Dease River Nation, is a band government of the Kaska Dena people in the Cassiar Country of the Northern Interior of British Columbia, Canada. Their offices are located in Good Hope Lake, British Columbia, which is on the Stewart-Cassiar Highway to the east of the abandoned mining town of Cassiar. The registered population of the band is 162.

== Indian Reserves ==
Indian Reserves under the administration of the Dease River First Nation are:

- Dease River IR No.1, 78.70 ha.
- Dease River IR No.2, on left bank of the Dease River 4 miles northeast of the mouth of the Blue River, 0.50 ha.
- Dease River IR No.3, 0.50 ha.
- Dease River IR No.4, 10 km north of Boya Lake Provincial Park 0.50 ha.

== See also ==
- Liard First Nation
