= Pelly River =

Headstream of the Yukon River

Pelly River (Ts'enkínyäk Chú)
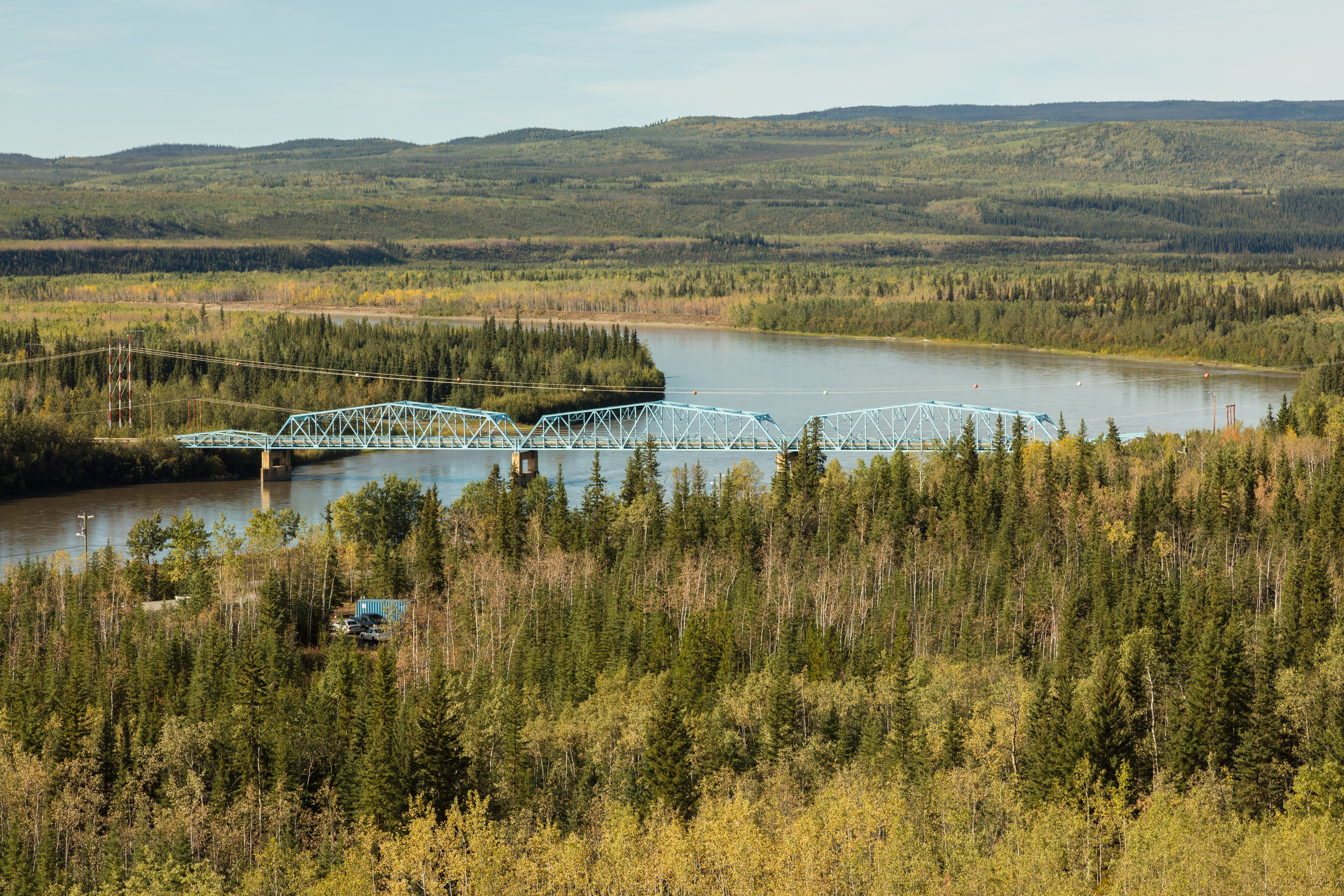
- Pelly River at Pelly Crossing

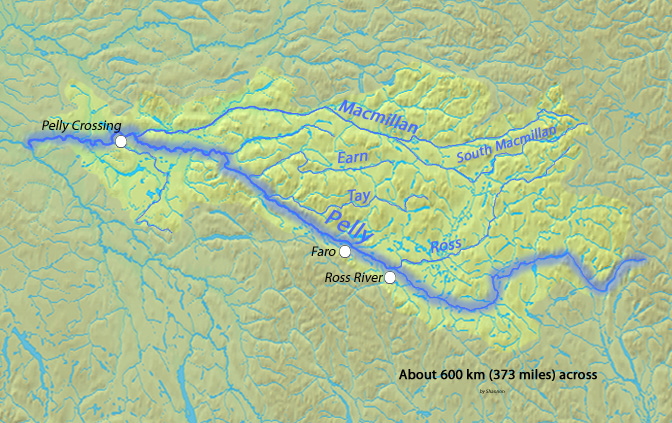
- Map of the Pelly River
- Etymology: Named by Robert Campbell in honour of Sir John Henry Pelly, governor of the Hudson's Bay Company.

Location
- Country: Canada
- Territory: Yukon
- Cities: Ross River; Faro; Pelly Crossing

Physical characteristics
- Source: Mackenzie Mountains
  - location: An unnamed glacier
  - coordinates: 62°26′32″N 129°11′34″W
  - elevation: 1,465 m (4,806 ft)
- Mouth: Yukon River
  - coordinates: 62°46′44″N 137°20′16″W display=inline,title
  - elevation: 458 m (1,503 ft)
- Length: 530 km (330 mi), East-southeast to west-northwest
- Basin size: 49,000 km^{2} (19,000 sq mi)
- Discharge
  - average: 700 m^{3}/s (25,000 cu ft/s)
  - minimum: 35 m^{3}/s (1,200 cu ft/s)
  - maximum: 4,160 m^{3}/s (147,000 cu ft/s)

Basin features
- Tributaries
  - right: Ross River, Tay River, Macmillan River

The Pelly River (Ts'ekínyäk Chú) is a river in Canada, and is a headstream of the Yukon River. The river originates west of the Mackenzie Mountains and flows 530 km (330 mi) through south-central Yukon. The Pelly has two main tributaries, the Ross and Macmillan rivers.

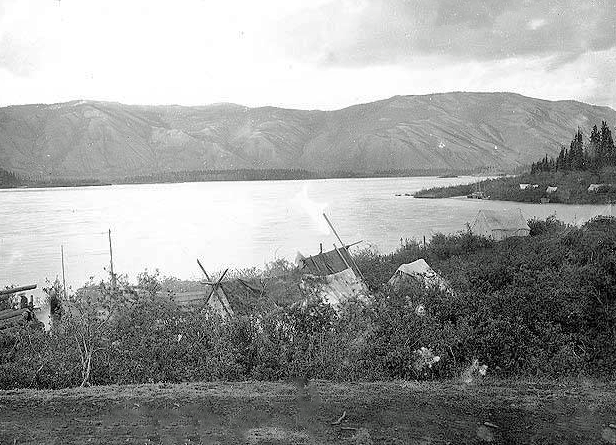
Tent camp along the Pelly River, 1898

The Selkirk First Nation (Hucha Hudan people) name for the river is Ts'enkínyäk Chú, meaning 'water running between the mountains'. The river was later named by Robert Campbell in honour of Sir John Henry Pelly, governor of the Hudson's Bay Company. The restored Hudson's Bay Company trading post of Fort Selkirk is at the juncture of the Pelly and Yukon Rivers.

== Course ==
The Pelly rises in glaciers on the western slopes of the Selwyn Mountains above 1,400 m (4,600 ft) in elevation, close to the Yukon-Northwest Territories boundary. It flows south and west through a wide valley, receiving many small tributaries from the east. It passes the Pelly Lakes, out of which flows the Woodside River, and there it turns to the west. The Pelly then assumes a northwesterly course through the Tintina Trench. It flows northwest to receive the Ross River at the town of Ross River where there is a cable ferry. Paralleling the Robert Campbell Highway, it then merges with the Lapie River from the left and passes the community of Faro which can be reached by a bridge. After Faro, it runs south of Rose Mountain and receives the Glenlyon River from the left.

At the Glenlyon River confluence, the valley narrows and the walls grow higher and steeper, and a short distance later, receives the swift-flowing Tay River from the right. Several kilometres after, it turns north and receives the Earn River, also from the right. The river soon exits out of the canyon and winds across a plain, where it receives the Tummel River from the left. It then receives the Macmillan River, its largest tributary, from the right, then turns west, looping around the town of Pelly Crossing and crossing under the Klondike Highway, one of only two bridges on its course (the other is in Faro). The river continues west for about 25 km (16 mi) to merge with the Yukon River near old Fort Selkirk.

== Watershed ==
One of two major headwaters of the Yukon River (the other is the Stewart River), the Pelly River's drainage basin, measured above the town of Pelly Crossing, is 49,000 km^{2} (19,000 sq mi) in size. It drains a large part of the sparsely populated Yukon Plateau of central Yukon west of the Mackenzie Mountains. The Tintina Trench, which the majority of the river's waters flow in, is the northernmost extension of the Rocky Mountain Trench, which stretches well south to British Columbia. The river is navigable by small and medium-sized craft for over 320 km (200 mi), from its mouth to Hoole Rapids, except for a shallow stretch of the river in Bradens Canyon. The Yukon communities of Ross River, Faro and Pelly Crossing are all on the Pelly River. There are bridges across the Pelly in Pelly Crossing (where it crosses the Klondike Highway) and in Faro, as well as a cable ferry at Ross River on the Canol Road.

The river's average discharge is about 700 m^{3}/s (25,000 cu ft/s) and it drains about 49,000 km^{2} (19,000 sq mi) of land. Because the river is fed primarily by glacier melt, the highest average flow is reached around June or July at up to 1,600 m^{3}/s (57,000 cu ft/s), and the lowest is in December or January as low as 35 m^{3}/s (1,200 cu ft/s).

== Hazards ==
Volcanoes near the Pelly River, such as Volcano Mountain, may have once partly blocked or at least altered the Pelly River. Any future activity in this area could disrupt the course of the river and could have a serious impact on people living or working downstream.

== See also ==
- List of longest rivers of Canada
- List of rivers of Yukon
