= Macmillan River =

River in Canada

Coordinates: 62°52′05″N 135°53′54″W

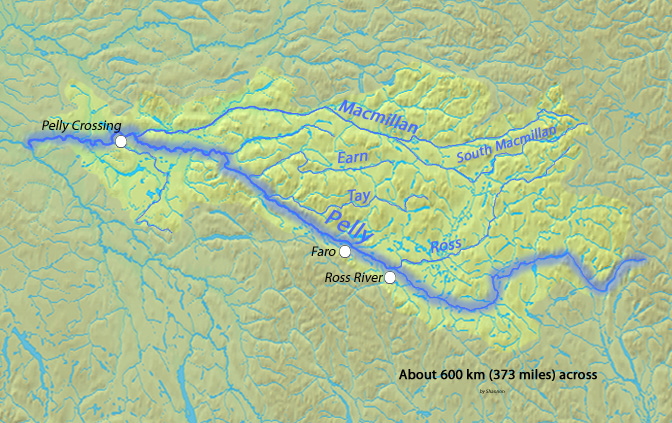
Map of the Pelly River watershed showing the Macmillan River

The Macmillan River is a tributary, approximately 320 kilometres (200 mi) long, of the Pelly River in the Yukon Territory of northwestern Canada. It originates in the Mackenzie Mountains and flows in a generally westward direction. The river's watershed extends over 13,800 square kilometres (5,300 mi^{2}) and its average discharge is about 190 cubic metres per second (6,700 cu ft/s).
