= Good Hope Lake =

- Location of Good Hope Lake in British Columbia
- Coordinates: 59°16′55″N 129°18′10″W
- Country: Canada
- Province: British Columbia
- Area codes: 250, 778

Good Hope Lake is a First Nations community in northwestern British Columbia, Canada, located on Highway 37 not far south of the border with the Yukon and located east of the semi-abandoned mining town of Cassiar, British Columbia. As of the 2006 Census, there are 41 people living in Good Hope Lake, down from 75 in 2001. The band government of the Dease River First Nation is located in Good Hope Lake, and is a member government of the Kaska Tribal Council.

== See also ==
- McDames Creek IR No.2 (Liard First Nation)
