= Gataga River =

Tributary river in the country of Canada

- Native name: Tadadzè' (Sekani)

Location
- Country: Canada
- State: British Columbia
- Region: Northern Interior
- District: Cassiar Land District

Physical characteristics
- Source: Gataga Lake
  - location: Northern Rocky Mountains, British Columbia
- Mouth: Kechika River
  - location: British Columbia
  - coordinates: 58°34′48″N 126°55′25″W

Basin features
- Progression: Kechika River → Liard River → Mackenzie River → Arctic Ocean
- River system: Mackenzie River drainage basin

The Gataga River is a river in the Northern Rockies of British Columbia, Canada. It is a tributary of the Kechika River, which is a tributary of the Liard.

== See also ==
- List of rivers of British Columbia
