= McDame Creek =

Creek in British Columbia, Canada

Coordinates: 59°11′N 129°14′W

McDame Creek is a creek in Cassiar Land District of British Columbia, Canada. The creek flows southeast into the Dease River and is south of Good Hope Lake. The creek was discovered in 1874 by a prospector named Harry McDame. McDame Creek was mined for gold in the 19th century. A camp, called Centreville, contained cabins and stores and served as a trading centre for miners working on McDame Creek in the 19th century. In 1877, a 72-ounce (2.04-kg) solid gold nugget, valued at $1,300, was found in McDame Creek. The solid gold nugget was found by a prospector named Al Freeman. This nugget was found roughly where 1st N. Fork Creek flows into McDame Creek. This was the largest found in the province until the Atlin gold rush by 1899, where an 88 ounce nugget was found at Spruce Creek.

== The Christie Lead ==
A gold miner named Christie, discovered a lead of gold near McDame Creek, in 1876. This gold lead became known as the "Christie Lead". The lead was a run of gold that was 30 meters wide and continuous for almost 1.5 kilometers. The lead returned $2,000 to $6,000 weekly. It was located between Snow Creek and 3rd North Fork Creek and ran parallel to McDame Creek. In 1877, the Christie Lead abruptly ran out. Many attempts were made to find where the lead may have continued along the creek. None of these attempts have been successful. Some believe the lost "Christie Lead" awaits rediscovery along the McDame Creek.
