= Fireside, British Columbia =

Unincorporated locality in British Columbia, Canada

Coordinates: 59°40′00″N 127°09′00″W

Fireside is an unincorporated locality on the Alaska Highway in far northern British Columbia, Canada, located at the junction of the Kechika and Liard Rivers. Muddy River Indian Reserve No. 1 is located nearby, as is an old steamer landing named Skooks.

== See also ==
- List of communities in British Columbia
