= Kaskaskia (disambiguation) =

The Kaskaskia were an indigenous North American tribe of the Northeastern Woodlands.

Kaskaskia may also refer to:

== Geography ==
- Kaskaskia, Illinois, a village in Randolph County
- Kaskaskia Precinct, Randolph County, Illinois
- Kaskaskia Township, Fayette County, Illinois

== Natural features ==
- Kaskaskia River, a tributary of the Mississippi River
- Kaskaskia sequence, a geological cratonic sequence

== Parks ==
- Fort Kaskaskia State Historic Site, commemorating the town of Old Kaskaskia, Illinois
- Kaskaskia River State Fish and Wildlife Area, an Illinois state park

== Trails ==
- Kaskaskia Alliance Trail, an extension of the Grand Illinois Trail
- Kaskaskia–Cahokia Trail, the first road in Illinois
- Shawneetown–Kaskaskia Trail, Southern Illinois

== Other ==
- Hotel Kaskaskia, a historic building in LaSalle, Illinois
- Illinois campaign, also called the Kaskaskia Expedition
- Kaskaskia Baptist Association, a Southern Baptist ministry in Patoka, Illinois
- Kaskaskia Bell State Memorial in Kaskaskia, Illinois
- Kaskaskia College, a public community college in Centralia, Illinois
- USS Kaskaskia (AO-27), a ship named for the Kaskaskia River

== See also ==
- Kaskas (disambiguation)
