= Ross River, Yukon =

Unincorporated community in Yukon, Canada

Ross River
- Unincorporated community
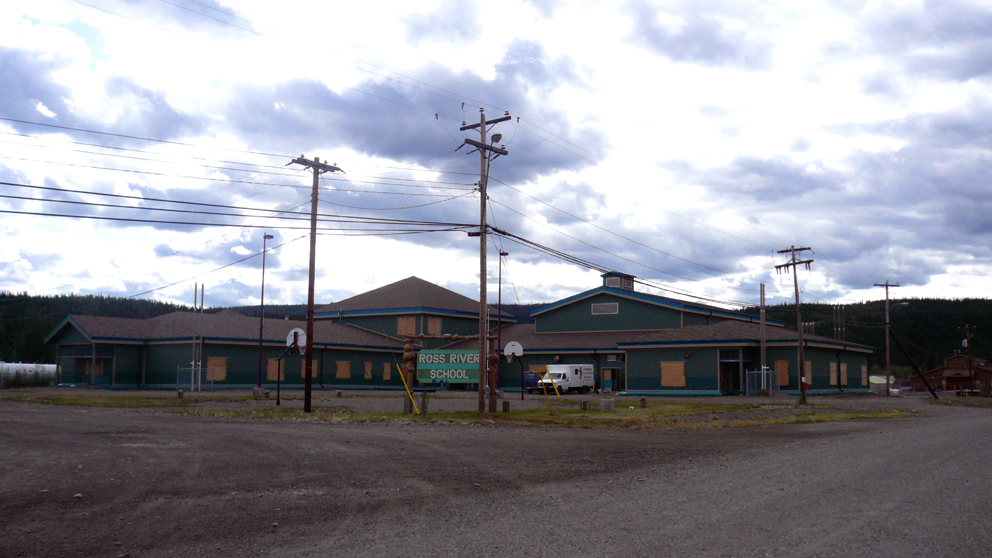

- Location within Yukon
- Coordinates: 61°58′49″N 132°27′02″W
- Country: Canada
- Territory: Yukon
- Settled: 1901

Government
  - Fed. riding: Yukon
  - Terr. riding: Watson Lake-Ross River-Faro

Area
  - Land: 20.48 km^{2} (7.91 sq mi)

Population (2021)
  - Total: 355
  - Density: 17.3/km^{2} (45/sq mi)
- Time zone: UTC-7 (MST)
- Postal code: Y0B 1S0
- Area code: 867

Ross River is an unincorporated community in Yukon, Canada. It lies at the junction of the Ross River and the Pelly River, along the Canol Road, not far from the Campbell Highway.

It is the home of the Ross River Dena Council, a First Nation in eastern Yukon.

== History ==
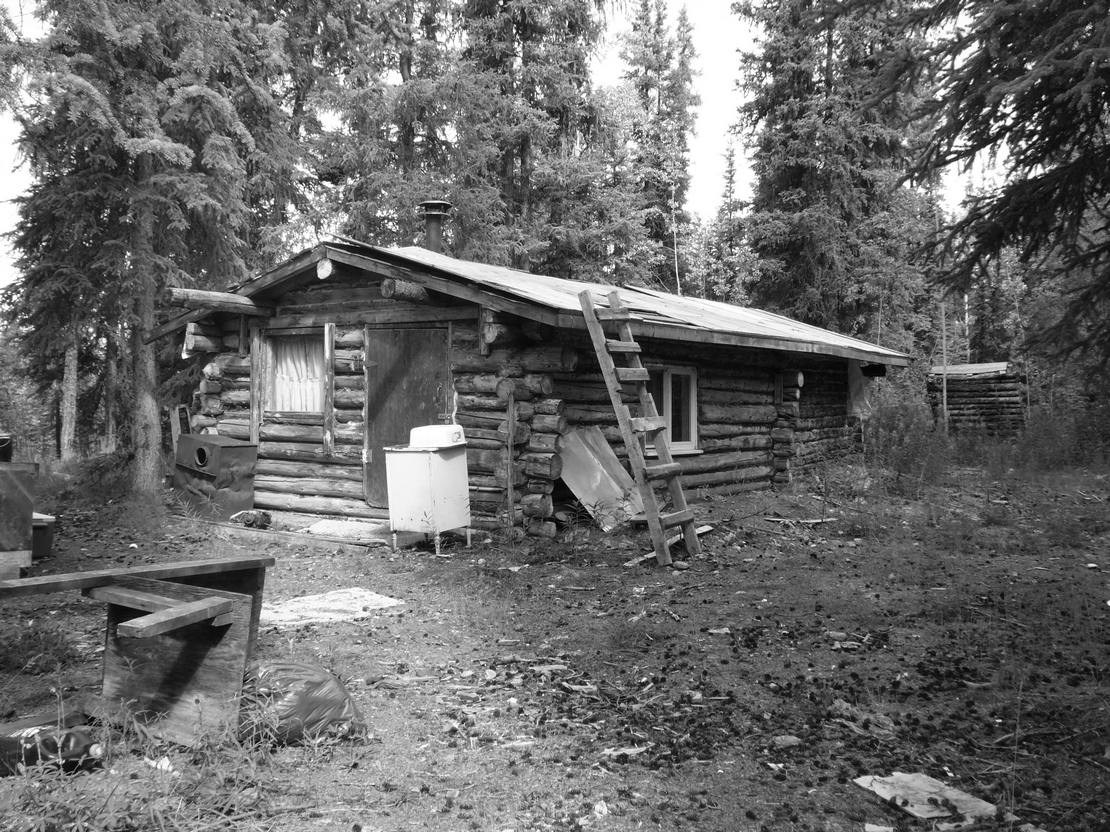
Trapper's cabin in Ross river county

The confluence of the Ross and Pelly rivers has long been used as a gathering place for First Nations peoples, particularly in late summer. The first modern settlement was established in 1901, when Tom Smith started a small fur-trading post on the north bank of the Pelly, which he called Smith's Landing. That winter, approximately fifteen First Nations families overwintered near the post, creating the beginnings of the permanent community of Ross River. By 1903, a second, rival trading post was opened on the south bank of the Pelly, opposite Smith's Landing. This settlement attracted an increasing number of people, including many First Nations from the Mackenzie River region (mostly the Kaska), who would travel over the divide to meet people, trade, and even settle-down, for some.

By 1914 over a thousand people were gathering at Ross River in the late summer; but a severe influenza epidemic in 1916 hit the community hard, and increasing economic activity and new trading posts along the Mackenzie River reduced the population.

World War II and the years immediately following it brought massive changes to Ross River. The building of the Canol Road and pipeline (between 1942 and 1944) brought a massive, albeit temporary, influx of newcomers, with the new road making the community more accessible. The road closed in 1946, and did not reopen again until 1958. The late 1940s and early 1950s also saw a collapse of fur prices and the permanent closure of most of the region's fur-trading posts, including at Pelly Banks, Sheldon Lake, Rose Point, Frances Lake and Macmillan River.

By 1952, Ross River maintained the only remaining trading post in the region. The Canol Road shifted the commercial centre of the community to the south bank of the Pelly River, at the new ferry crossing point, and the federal government began pressuring the First Nations communities to move across river from the Old Village. By the mid 1960s, the community of Ross River assumed the shape it has today.

== Geography ==
=== Climate ===
Ross River has a subarctic climate (Dfc), characterised by cold winters and short, mild summers. The snowiest months are typically between October and February, with some light snowfall always being possible in March and April, as well.

Climate data for Ross River (Ross River Airport) Coordinates 61°58′N 132°26′W; elevation: 705 m (2,313 ft); 1961–1990 normals
Month	Jan	Feb	Mar	Apr	May	Jun	Jul	Aug	Sep	Oct	Nov	Dec	Year
Average precipitation mm (inches)	—	11.6 (0.46)	10.7 (0.42)	8.1 (0.32)	16.4 (0.65)	31.9 (1.26)	46.9 (1.85)	35.5 (1.40)	24.7 (0.97)	18.3 (0.72)	18.5 (0.73)	14.6 (0.57)	—
Average rainfall mm (inches)	0.0 (0.0)	0.0 (0.0)	0.0 (0.0)	3.4 (0.13)	16.1 (0.63)	31.9 (1.26)	46.9 (1.85)	34.9 (1.37)	22.6 (0.89)	5.3 (0.21)	0.2 (0.01)	0.0 (0.0)	161.3 (6.35)
Average snowfall mm (inches)	—	11.6 (0.46)	10.7 (0.42)	4.7 (0.19)	0.4 (0.02)	0.0 (0.0)	0.0 (0.0)	0.5 (0.02)	2.0 (0.08)	13.0 (0.51)	18.2 (0.72)	14.6 (0.57)	—
Average precipitation days (≥ 0.2 mm)	—	5.0	4.0	2.0	7.0	9.0	13.0	11.0	9.0	7.0	8.0	7.0	—
Average rainy days (≥ 0.2 mm)	0.0	0.0	0.0	—	6.0	9.0	13.0	11.0	9.0	2.0	—	0.0	50.0
Average snowy days (≥ 0.2 cm)	—	5.0	4.0	2.0	—	0.0	0.0	—	—	5.0	8.0	7.0	—
Source: Environment and Climate Change Canada (precipitation data only

== Demographics ==
In the 2021 Census of Population conducted by Statistics Canada, Ross River had a population of 355 living in 160 of its 184 total private dwellings, a change of 21.2% from its 2016 population of 293. With a land area of 20.48 km^{2} (7.91 sq mi), it had a population density of 17.3/km^{2} (44.9/sq mi) in 2021.

Federal census population history of Ross River

Year	Pop.	±%
1941	53	—
1951	88	+66.0%
1981	294	+234.1%
1986	352	+19.7%
1991	324	−8.0%
1996	352	+8.6%

Year	Pop.	±%
2001	337	−4.3%
2006	313	−7.1%
2011	352	+12.5%
2016	293	−16.8%
2021	355	+21.2%

Source: Statistics Canada

== Economy ==
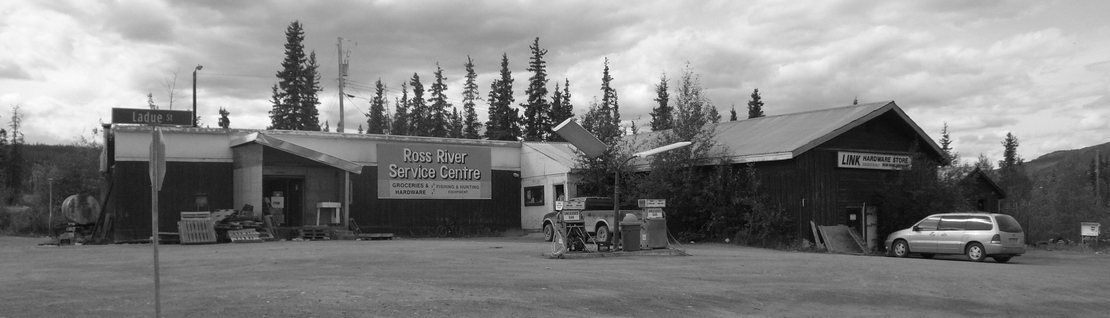
Ross River service centre

Mining exploration increased in the region around Ross River through the 1950s and an exploration and mining boom occurred in the 1960s and 1970s with the discovery and development of the Faro mine.

In 1950 and 1951 Al Kulan, who was inducted into the Canadian Mining Hall of Fame in 2005, prospected the Pelly Range. In 1952 he located mineralization in the Anvil district. In 1953 Ross River Dena citizen Jack Sterriah mentioned a heavy concentration of rust in Vangorda Creek that he had known about as a boy. That year Kulan, Peter Thompson along with Dena citizens Arthur John, China Sterriah, Jack Ladue and Robert Etzel prospected Vangorda Creek and found the first significant mineralization in the area on July 2. They, along with Dena members Joe Etzel and Jack Steriah, were issued shares in the company formed as a result of the discovery, Vangorda Mines Ltd. The property was optioned to Prospectors Airways, headquartered in Toronto.

Arthur John, a Dena elder, learned prospecting from, and worked with, Kulan in the early 1950s and his fluency in English enabled him to serve as an intermediary between Kulan and other Ross River Dena members who also learned to identify minerals. John had a long career prospecting with Conwest Exploration as well as Kulan's companies Spartan Exploration and Welcome North Mines.

From 1954 to 1957 Kulan prospected north-west of the Vangorda and discovered a rusty area. Geochemical and geophysical surveys resulted in several drill targets. Prospectors Airways would only pay for a packsack drill. The first drill hole was attempted over the No. 2 orebody of what, a decade later, would become Canada's largest lead-zinc mine. This hole could not reach the bedrock due to heavy overburden. The program was discontinued. In 1964 the property was re-staked by Dynasty Explorations which Kulan was a director and officer of. Dynasty staked large tracts of the district and identified many drill targets. Due to lack of funds they joined forces with Cyprus Mines Corporation of Los Angeles. The joint venture was running over budget when a move was made to one of the mineralized sites selected by Kulan, which was one of the last hopes for the discovery of a successful body of ore. In the summer of 1965 the discovery of the mine was made and resulted in the biggest staking rush the Yukon Territory had ever seen. The mine closed permanently in 1997.

== Transportation ==
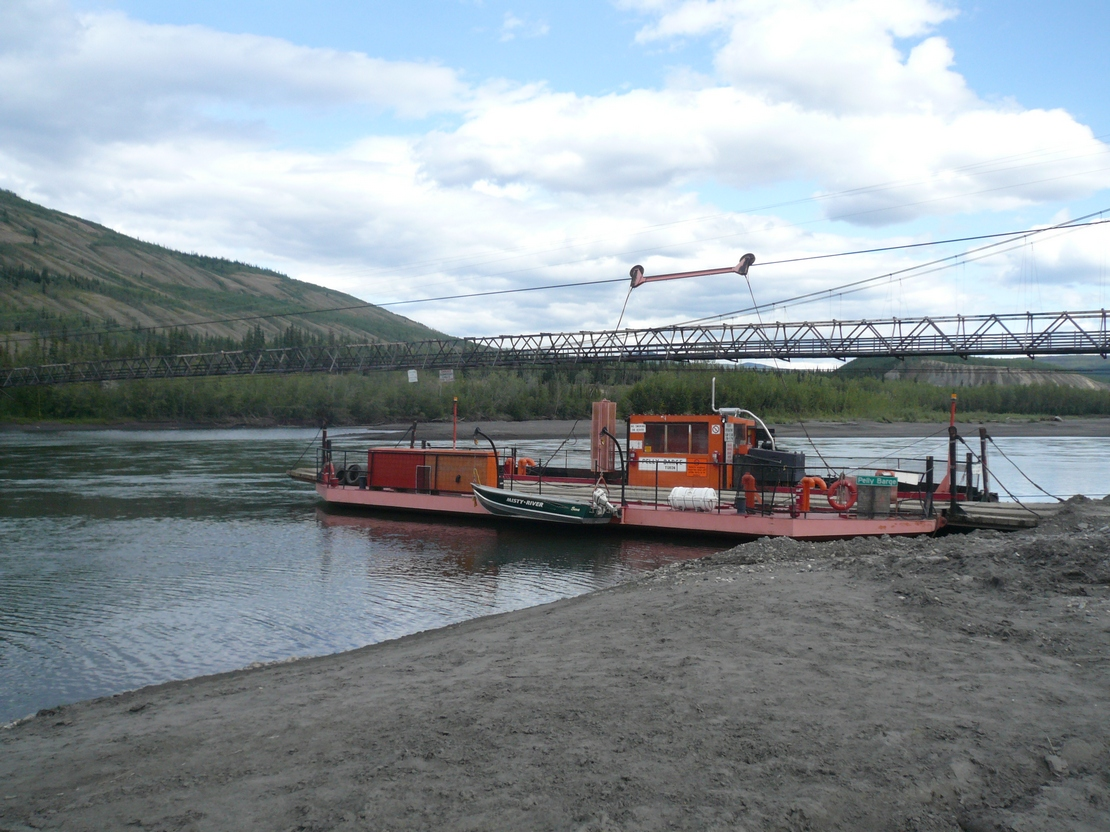
Ferry across Pelly River, with the Canol footbridge in the background

Primary access to the Campbell Highway is via a nine-mile access road. Formerly it was accessed along a six-mile Canol Road section that is no longer maintained.

It is serviced by Ross River Airport, used mainly for charter and scheduled flights to and from Whitehorse and Watson Lake.

== Media ==
The Ross River community was too small to get a satellite-serviced transmitter for CBC and did not even have a CBC Radio broadcast transmitter – residents would drive to Faro to listen to the 1972 Canada-Russia hockey series.

The first television service arrived after intervention from Al Kulan, who hired a helicopter and pilot from Whitehorse and flew from mountaintop to mountaintop on a bitterly cold night to find the signal from Faro's five-watt CBC TV transmitter (at the time, only transmitting four hours per day). After a signal was detected on Grew Creek Hill, a plan was developed and presented to the community association. The association approved action without an official licence, due to their dismay at the extensive bureaucracy that was delaying installation of a CBC radio transmitter.

Kulan paid for the equipment, and the community's men volunteered their work, bulldozing a road up the mountain. With some makeshift provision of tower and generator, the repeater began operating about the end of March 1973, picking up Faro's signal (now 12 hours per day off the Anik satellite).

The transmitter caught the government's attention, but the residents steadfastly refused to shut it down and requested a licence. In early 1975, CBC Radio was finally installed. Ross River's community effort led in 1976 to other similar projects that brought TV to every community; Teslin installed their own satellite dish (illegal until 1979), and the Yukon government attempted to negotiate a lower lease price with Telesat Canada which had a monopoly on satellite earth stations until 1979.

== See also ==
- Kudz Ze Kayah mine, a proposed mine near the river
