= Robert Campbell (fur trader) =

Canadian fur trader and explorer (1808–1894)

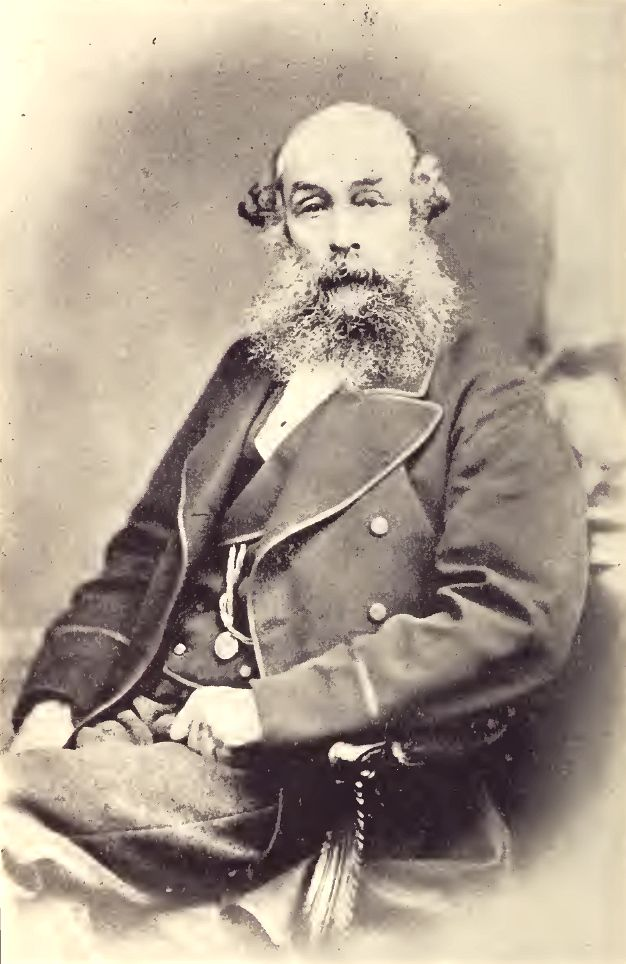
- Born: February 21, 1808; Glen Lyon, Perthshire, Scotland
- Died: May 9, 1894 (aged 86); Elphinstone, Manitoba, Canada
- Burial place: Kildonan, Manitoba, Canada
- Occupations: fur trader, explorer, Chief Factor

Robert Campbell (21 February 1808 – 9 May 1894) was a Hudson's Bay Company fur trader and explorer.

Campbell explored a large part of the southern Yukon and northern British Columbia. He established the short-lived Dease Lake Post in 1837, and in 1838, he was the first European to reach the Stikine River overland. He established Fort Frances, Yukon on Frances Lake in the Liard River basin. In 1840 he crossed from Frances Lake to the Pelly River becoming the first European to explore the upper Yukon River Basin. He established Fort Selkirk, Yukon, at the juncture of the Yukon River and the Pelly River.

His discoveries led to little financial gain at the time. All of the posts that he established were abandoned within a few years, largely because of to the high price of transporting trade goods from Hudson Bay, via the Methye Portage and Mackenzie River. Meanwhile, there were already well-established native trading routes leading to nearby Russian Alaska on the Pacific Ocean.

He was also for a time in charge of Fort Halkett.

Campbell Peak, just south of the British Columbia community of Liard River, is named after him, as is the Robert Campbell Highway in the Yukon and the Robert Campbell Bridge which connects the suburb of Riverdale to the downtown of Whitehorse, Yukon.
