= Kaskian language =

Unclassified language of Bronze Age Anatolia

Kaskian
- Kaška
- Region: Northeastern Anatolia; Colchis
- Ethnicity: Kaskians
- Extinct: c.900 BC
- Language family: unclassified (Hatto-Kaskian?)

Language codes
- ISO 639-3: zsk
- Glottolog: None

Kaskian (Kaskean) was the language of the Kaskians (Kaska) of northeastern Bronze Age Anatolia in the mountains along the Black Sea coast. The Encyclopedia of Indo-European Culture lists the Kaskians as non–Indo-European. There are a number of theories regarding the language family to which it belonged.

It is sometimes suspected that Kaskian was related to the pre-Hittite Hattic language, based on toponyms and personal names; the Hattic moon god was named Kasku. Conversely, the Kaskian language may have been an Indo-European language, perhaps related to Thraco-Phrygian. There may also be connections to the Northwest Caucasian languages; the name Kaskian may be cognate with an old name for Circassia, and the name of one of the tribes in the Kaskian confederation, the Abešla, may be cognate with the endonym of the Abkhaz people and some Circassian people, suggesting the Kaskians proper and Abešla might have been the ancestors of the Circassians and other Northwest Caucasian-speaking peoples. It has been conjectured that Kaskian might belong to the Zan family of languages, and have affinities to Megrelian or Laz.

In 2023, D. Sasseville presented an unknown language preserved on several tablet fragments from the archives of Hattusa and argued on methodological grounds that it was agglutinative and could be the Kaskian language.

The Kaskian language continued to be spoken around the Black Sea until approximately the 10th century BC, where it was absorbed by neighbouring Anatolian, Phrygian and Karto-Zan languages.
