= Cassiar River =

Coordinates: 58°39′06″N 128°05′17″W

The Cassiar River is a tributary of the Turnagain River in far northern British Columbia, flowing north to join the latter river southeast of Cry Lake. Its name is a reference to the Cassiar Land District, which it flows through the middle of and was the setting of the Cassiar Gold Rush of the 1870s.

== See also ==
- Cassiar (disambiguation)
- List of rivers of British Columbia
