= Ross River (Yukon) =

Coordinates: 61°59′1″N 132°25′21″W

The Ross River in the Yukon, Canada is one of the main tributaries of the Pelly River. It rises in the Mackenzie Mountains and the community of Ross River can be found where it joins the Pelly. In 1843, Robert Campbell named the river after Donald Ross, a chief factor of the Hudson's Bay Company.

== See also ==
- List of rivers of Yukon
