= Denetiah Provincial Park and Protected Area =

Provincial park in the Stikine Region of British Columbia, Canada

- IUCN category II (national park)
- Location within British Columbia
- Interactive map of Denetiah Provincial Park and Protected Area
- Location: Stikine Region, British Columbia, Canada
- Coordinates: 58°30′00″N 127°22′00″W
- Area: 105,349 ha (406.75 sq mi)
- Established: June 29, 1999
- Governing body: BC Parks

Denetiah Provincial Park and Protected Area is a provincial park and protected area located in the northern interior of British Columbia, Canada. It was established on June 29, 1999, to protect a large area of pristine wilderness at the headwaters of the Denetiah and Dahl Rivers. The park can be accessed via boat, helicopter, or by hiking or horseback through the Davie Trail.

There are no designated, maintained roads that enter the park.

== Geography ==
Denetiah Provincial Park is composed of a 97,908 hectare Class A Park unit and a 7,441 hectare protected area unit. The provincial park is part of the larger Muskwa-Kechika Management Area, which aims to coordinate the management of Denetiah Provincial Park with 14 other provincial parks and protected areas in the region.

The park protects Dall and Denetiah Lakes, which are long, thin, and glacially-carved. On top of this, the headwaters to the Denetiah and Dall Rivers are also located inside of the park.

== See also ==
- Dall River Old Growth Provincial Park
