= Kaska Dena =

First Nations people of Canada

Kaska
Total population
- 1,435 (2016 census)

Regions with significant populations
- Canada (British Columbia, Yukon)

Languages
- English, Kaska

Religion
- Christianity, Animism

Related ethnic groups
- Tagish, Tahltan, Nahani

Dene "person"
- People: Kaska Dena
- Language: Kaska Dena Zágéʼ
- Country: Kaska Dena Kayeh, Denendeh

The Kaska or Kaska Dena are a First Nations people of the Athabaskan-speaking ethnolinguistic group living mainly in northern British Columbia and the southeastern Yukon in Canada. The Kaska language, originally spoken by the Kaska, is an Athabaskan language.

The Kaska Dena constituted five local bands:

- Tu tcogotena (Tu’tcogotena) or Tu cho gha nugga dhal (″Big Water Dwellers″) are the Dena people that occupy the Tucho (Frances Lake) and the Tucho Tue (Frances River) area stretching to the Hyland and Smith rivers. They hunted also the Too-Ti (Liard) and Tucho Tue (Dease River) areas. Also known as McDame Post Kaska or Fort McDame Kaska because they traded at the McDame Post (Fort McDame) trading post (at the mouth of McDame Creek into the Dease River); also referred to as Frances Lake Kaska in some sources.
- Ki stagotena (Ki’stagotena) or Tsetotena (Tsay tow tena) (″Mountain Dwellers″) dominated the south and south east of the Natitu a gotena Kaska. Their traditional range included the valleys of the Dease River south from Net I tue to the northern part of Dease Lake where a natural divide separated them from the inland neighbours. Ki stagotena living along Duna za (McDames), meaning “pure place where people stay”, above its junction with the Dease River was also known as Ozanna, “people of the same blood”. Also known as Dease River Kaska.
- Espatodena (E)spa’totena) or Espa tah dena (″Dwellers Among the Wild Goats″) and Gata otena (″People Who Hunt Rabbits″) are concentrated within a range east of the Tu tcogotena Kaska north of Tsa Tue (Beaver River) and the Nahanni River. They also hunted at the junction of the Atsonne Tue (Moose Dung Water River/Coal River) and Tyagacho (Big River/Liard).
- Naatitu a gotena (Natitu?a’gotena) or Na aw ti to a gotena (″Dwellers at a Sharp Mountain Where a Little River Starts″) occupied the head water country portion of the Liard River called Net I Tue, down to the Canyon above Daylu (Lower Post) which means “a place where we gather to trade”. They made seasonal migrations to the salmon runs at Tu disdis Tue (Pelly River) which means “you can see clearly into the deep water”. Seasonal fishing also was done at Tuts Algua (Watson Lake) or Lu cho, and game was harvested along Agedze Tue (Hyland River) which means “too much game”. The Tu tcogotena Kaska also used the Hyland River and called it Bath-o-too-a (Dangerous River). Since their trading center was traditionally located at Daelyu, the "Lower Post" trading post was officially opened there in 1876, and they were therefore referred to as Lower Post Kaska; in some sources they are also referred to as Upper Liard Kaska.
- Tse lona (Tse’lona) or Tsay lona (″Mountain Top″) populated the area south and east of the Ki stagotena. They lived and hunted the Rocky Mountain trench headwaters and valleys, the Kechika range over to the Toad River area and north to the Flat River. Some families in this group are known as Tse Ts iyinetena/Tse Tsiyinetena or “Wolf People of the Mountains”. Before the Hudson Bay post of “Ghee House” was open in 1880, Tse lona Kaska would trade at Fort Nelson and therefor also known as (Fort) Nelson Kaska.

Kaska Dena communities and First Nations include:

- Ross River, Yukon (Ross River Dena Council)
- Watson Lake and Upper Liard, Yukon (Liard River First Nation)
- Good Hope Lake, British Columbia (Dease River First Nation)
- Lower Post, British Columbia near Watson Lake (Kaska Nation)
- Kwadacha First Nation (Fort Ware), many members have both Sekani and Kaska ancestry.

Kaska Dena also live in British Columbia communities of Fireside and Muncho Lake, between Watson Lake and Fort Nelson along the Alaska Highway. Historically the Kaska people have had a respectful relationship with the land and the environment. Kaska took part in the traditional First Nations seasonal round, following game like caribou and other seasonal food like berries. They used waterways like the Liard River and Frances River to travel from Dease Lake to Frances Lake. They also had several established bush trails for travelling.

By one account, the name of the asbestos-mining ghost town Cassiar is believed to be a variant of Kaska, the town being named for the Kaska people; by another account, the word the name Cassiar derives from is a Kaska word either for a black bird, or for the fibrous asbestos ore upon which the town was built.

After colonization of Yukon, the building of the Alaska Highway, and the government's attempts at assimilation, the Kaska people have lost much of their culture. This includes a substantial loss of the Kaska language. Lower Post was the location of the residential school that the Kaska children had to attend until it closed in 1975.

In 2005, the film One of Many by the French filmmaker Jo Béranger (original French title, Voyage en mémoires indiennes, 2004) profiled Sally Tisiga, a Kaska person, in search of her cultural identity.
