= Dease River =

Tributary of the Liard River in British Columbia, Canada

Coordinates: 59°55′00″N 128°29′00″W

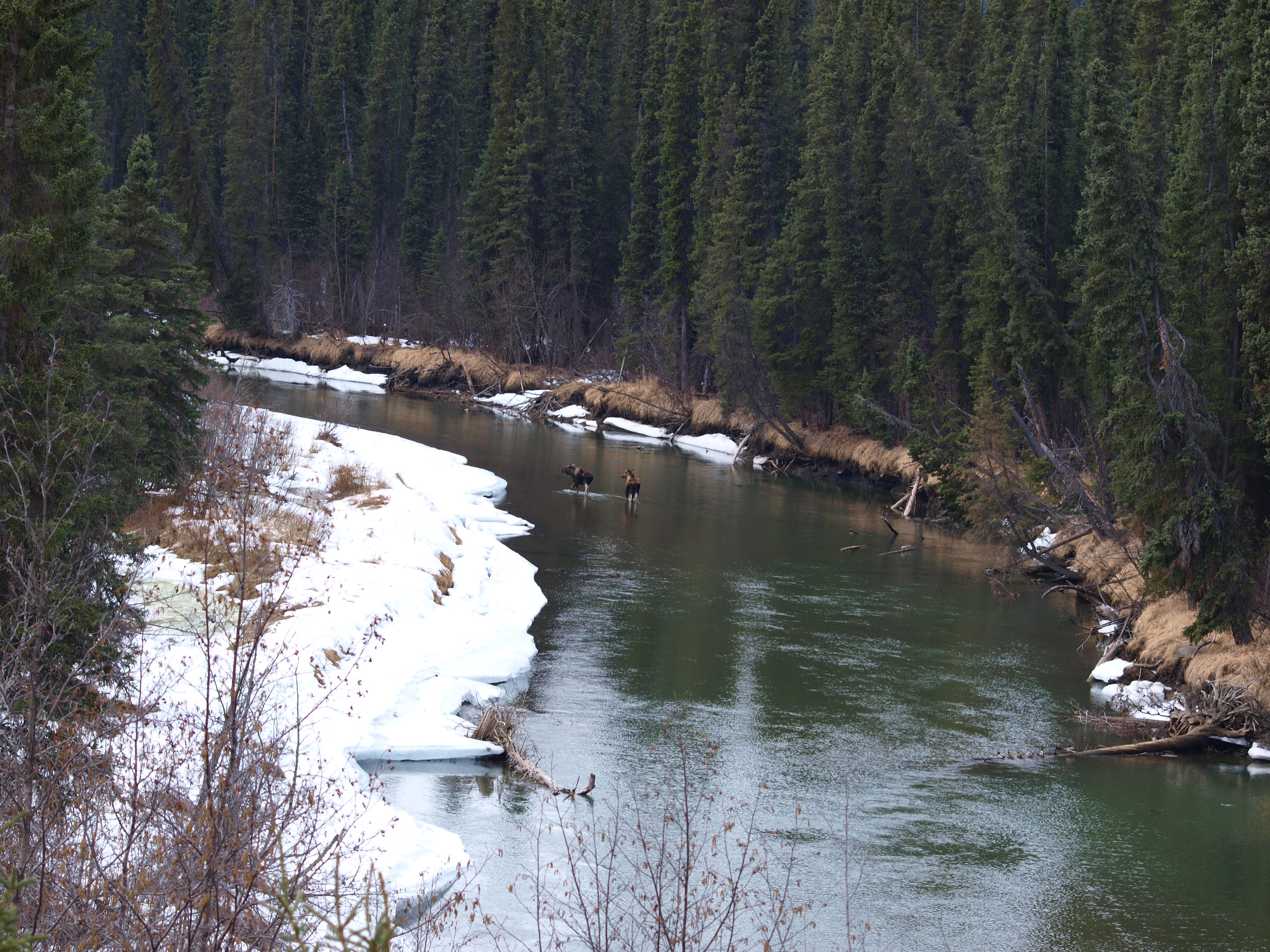

Location
- Country: Canada

Physical characteristics
- Source
  - location: Little Dease Creek at Snow Peak
- Mouth
  - location: Liard River
- Length: 265 km (165 mi)

The Dease River flows through northwestern British Columbia, Canada and is a tributary of the Liard River. The river descends from Dease Lake, though its ultimate origin is in the headwaters of Little Dease Creek at Snow Peak, approximately 50 kilometres (31 mi) west of the lake. The river flows 265 kilometres (165 mi) generally north-eastward, draining into the Liard River near Lower Post, British Columbia. Large sections of the river parallel the Cassiar Highway, helping to make it a popular destination for canoeists, kayakers, and rafters.

The area has a rich history. It is important to the history of Tahltan and Kaska First Nations, who continue to reside along the river. The first European known to have visited the river was John McLeod, a Hudson's Bay Company fur trader and explorer, in August 1831. He named the river for Peter Warren Dease, at the time Chief factor of the Mackenzie River District of the Hudson's Bay Company. In 1837, Robert Campbell established a Hudson's Bay Company fur trading post at Dease Lake. The community of Dease Lake has a population of approximately 650, and is the major centre in the river's watershed.

In fiction:

In Jack London's short story, "Love of Life," the protagonist is trying to make his way to "the river Dease," where he has a cache of food and supplies hidden.

== See also ==
- List of rivers of British Columbia
- Dease River First Nation
