= Lower Post =

Coordinates: 59°56′N 128°30′W

Lower Post is an aboriginal community in the Stikine Region of far northern British Columbia, Canada, located on Highway 97, the Alaska Highway, approximately 15 miles (24 kilometres) southeast of Watson Lake, Yukon. Its historical mile designation is Mile 620. It is located near the confluence of the Dease and Liard Rivers.

== History ==
Early fur traders named it Lower Post to distinguish between the upper and lower Liard trading posts. Lower Post, or Fort Liard (its original name), had been established by an American, Rufus Sylvester, in 1872. Four years later the Hudson's Bay Company took it over and a couple of years afterwards two of its officials brokered peace between the local Kaska Dena and a raiding party of two hundred Taku.

Before Lower Post became a community, it served as a fishing spot, a crossing and a meeting place. Because many different indigenous people stopped here for trading, the community still has a diverse ethnic make-up today. In the early 1940s, it served as a stopover for scheduled airline passenger service between Whitehorse and Edmonton via Fort Nelson.

One of the aboriginal languages spoken in Lower Post is Kaska, of which there are very few fluent speakers.

There are no services provided at Lower Post, with residents using services at nearby Watson Lake, Yukon. Electricity is supplied by ATCO Electric Yukon as opposed to BC Hydro.

The local school, Denetia School, is a K-7 elementary school that is British Columbia's most northern school and part of the School District 87 Stikine. The school currently operates as a one-room school focusing on outdoor experiential education called P.A.C.E.S. In 2011 it had a class of twelve students.

In 2016, approximately 81 people lived in Lower Post, which is a decrease from the 2011 population of 105.

== Gallery ==
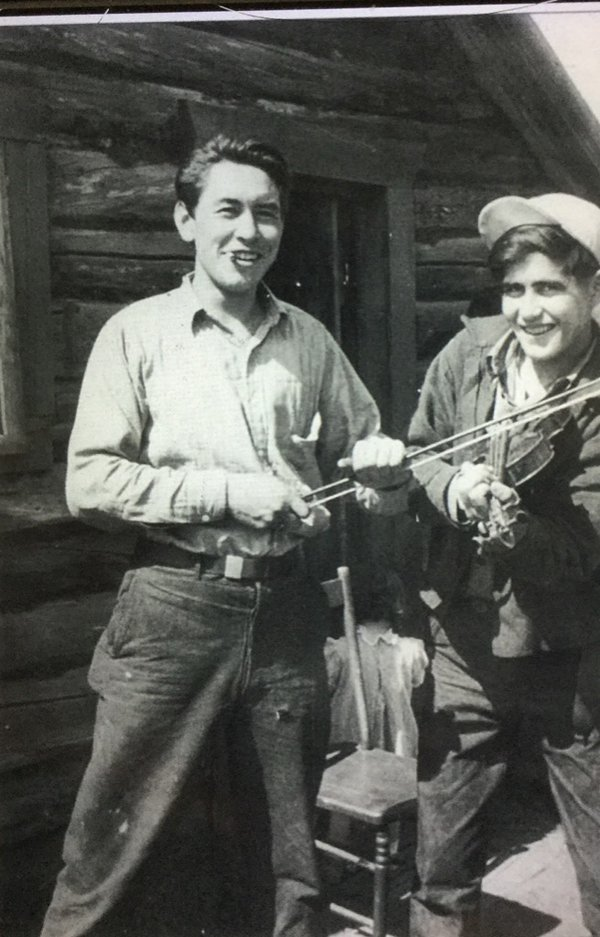
Two men with fiddle and bow, 1945

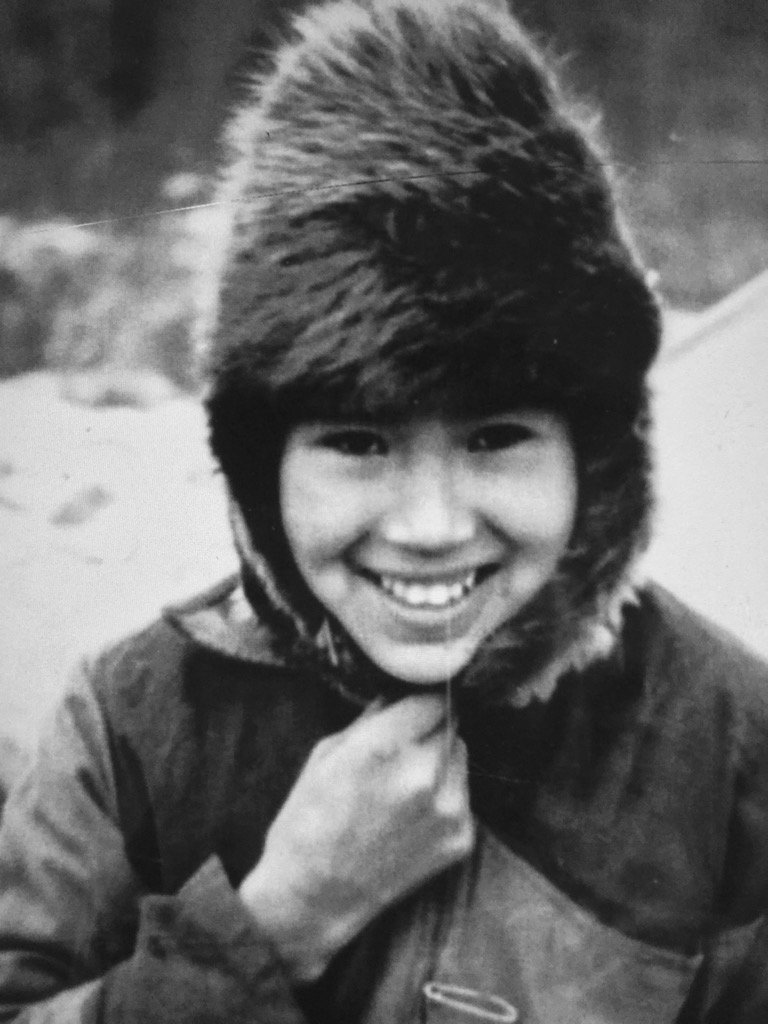
Young woman with hat, 1945

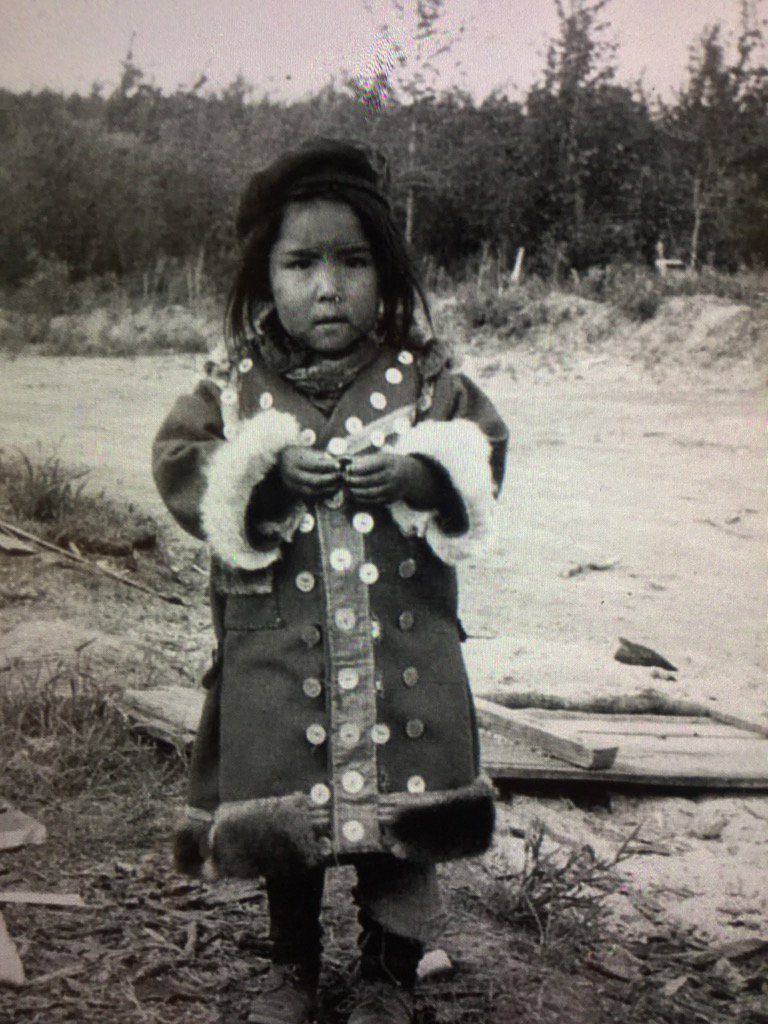
Girl in jacket, 1945

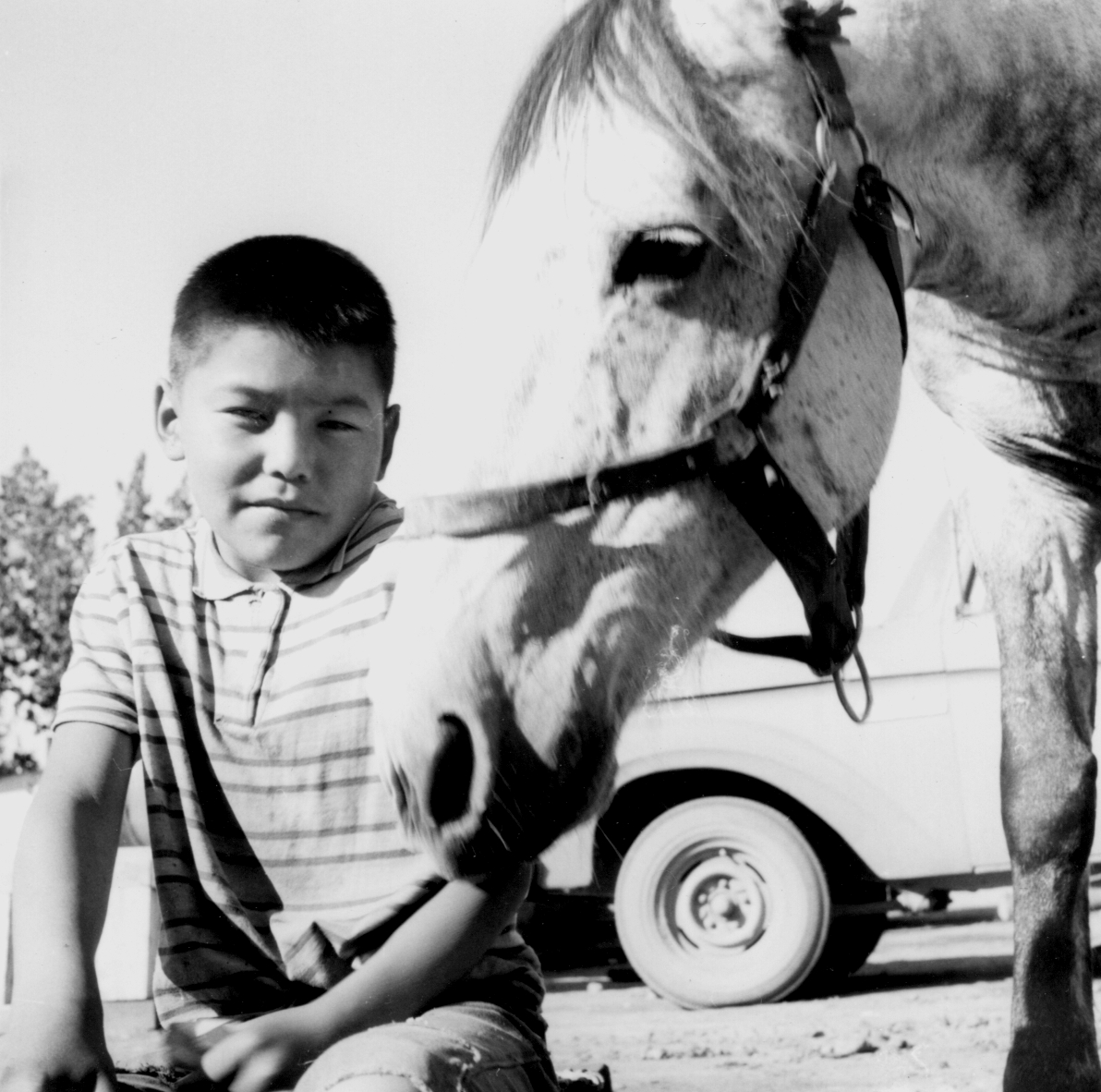
Lower Post Young boy with horse, 1971
