= Kaska language =

Northern Athabaskan language

Kaska
- Dene Zágéʼ
- Native to: Canada
- Ethnicity: 1,435 Kaska (2016 census)
- Native speakers: 110 (2021 census)
- Language family: Na-Dené: Athabaskan; Northern Athabaskan; Central Cordillera; Kaska

Language codes
- ISO 639-3: kkz
- Glottolog: kask1239
- ELP: Danezāgé' (Kaska)
- Kaska is classified as Severely Endangered by the UNESCO Atlas of the World's Languages in Danger.

Dene "person"
- People: Kaska Dena
- Language: Kaska Dena Zágéʼ
- Country: Kaska Dena Kayeh, Denendeh

Kaska is an endangered Athabaskan language. Traditionally, Kaska was an oral aboriginal language used by the Kaska Dena people. The Kaska Dene region consists of a small area in the Southwestern part of the Northwest Territories, the Southeastern part of Yukon Territory, and the Northern part of British Columbia. The communities that are in the Kaska Dene region are Ross River and Watson Lake in Y.T.; Dease Lake, Good Hope Lake, Lower Post, Fireside, and Muncho Lake in B.C. Kaska is made up of eight dialects, all of which have similar pronunciations and expressional terms. The town of Watson Lake was established around the period of the second World War when the Alaska Highway was built in 1942. A major consequence of colonization was Kaska language loss. Another major cause of Kaska language loss in Canada was due to the Canadian Residential School System. The effect that these schools had on the Kaska language have caused a language gap between two generations, resulting in few young speakers.

== Endangerment ==
With around 200 speakers as of 2011, the Ethnologue lists Kaska as Status 7 (shifting). It is mostly Kaska Dena Elders who are the fluent speakers despite four communities (Good Hope Lake, Lower Post, Watson Lake and Ross River) where the language is taught in schools. Kaska Dena children are not learning to be fluent because many families do not use the Kaska language at home. The Kaska Dena people recognize the importance in revitalizing the Kaska language and have worked towards building Kaska language written and oral materials as well as programs such as culture camps and training programs.

== Phonology ==
=== Consonants ===
		Labial	Dental	Alveolar			Post-al. /Palatal	Velar	Glottal
		Labial	Dental	median	sibilant	lateral	Post-al. /Palatal	Velar	Glottal
Nasal		m		n					
Stop	tenuis	p	tθ	t	ts	tɬ	tʃ	k	ʔ
Stop	aspirated	pʰ	tθʰ	tʰ	tsʰ	tɬʰ	tʃʰ	kʰ	
Stop	ejective		tθʼ	tʼ	tsʼ	tɬʼ	tʃʼ	kʼ	
Fricative	voiceless		θ		s	ɬ	ʃ	x	h
Fricative	voiced		ð		z	ɮ	ʒ	ɣ	
Rhotic				r					
Approximant		w					j		

=== Vowels ===
Kaska makes use of the vowels /a/, /e/, /i/, /o/, and /u/, which, through various combinations of inflection (high, falling, and rising tone), lengthening and nasalization, produce about 60 vowel sounds in total.

	Front	Central	Back
Close	i, iː, ĩ		u, uː, ũ
Near-close	(ɪ)		(ʊ)
Close-mid	e	(ə)	o, oː, õ
Open-mid	(ɛ), ɛ̃	(ə)	ʌ, ʌ̃
Open	æː, (æ̃ː)	aː, ãː	

Allophones of sounds /i, e, o, ɛ̃/ can also be heard as [ɪ, ɛ~ə, ʊ, æ̃ː].

== Morphology ==
Kaska is a polysynthetic language, commonly featuring sentence words. It is head-final, availing nine prefix positions to a given stem verb morpheme. Kaska does not mark for control or grammatical gender. (Sexual gender is often implied in narratives through contextual association with the prevalent gender roles of Kaska society, particularly with regard to warfare.)

=== The Verb-Sentence ===
Verb-sentences, or single-word sentences consisting of a stem verb modified by inflectional, derivational and/or other types of affixes, commonly appear in Kaska. In these cases, a word-final verb morpheme may be accompanied by up to nine prefixes grouped into three categories: the disjunct, the conjunct and the verb theme. O'Donnell's Kaska verb structure diagram is shown below.

Disjunct Prefixes			Conjunct Prefixes				Verb Theme		
Oblique Object	Postposition	Distributive Plural	Subject Agreement II	Direct Object	Mood/Aspect	Subject Agreement I	Thematic Prefix	Classifier	Verb Stem

==== Verb Theme ====
The verb theme carries the stem verb morpheme, which is immediately preceded by one of four classifiers (-h-, -Ø-, -l-, -d-).

The -Ø- classifier primarily marks intransitive and stative verbs.

The classifier -h-, referred to as ł classification in Athabaskan literature, marks transitivity and/or causativity and deletes when preceded by the first-person singular subject marking s-. Though it is found in some intransitive clauses, as in sehtsū́ts ("clothlike object is located"), these generally bear the -Ø- classifier.

- etsén segan 'the meat is dried'
- etsén sehgan 's/he dried the meat'

The -d- classifier serves a more complex function, accompanying self-benefactives, reflexives, reciprocals, iteratives (marked by the prefix ne-) and passives.

The -l- classifier combines the functions of the -d- and -h- (ł) classifiers.

==== Conjunct ====
The conjunct, which appears between the disjunct prefix group and the verb theme, carries inflectional information including subject, direct object and mood/aspect markings. In subject markings, Kaska syntactically differentiates between "subject I" and "subject II" morphemes (the latter represented in the gray boxes in the table below to the left).

Subject Markers in Kaska
	Singular	Plural
1st person	s-	dze-
2nd person	n-	ah-
3rd person	Ø-	ge-

Direct Object Markers in Kaska
	Singular	Plural
1st person	se-	gu-
2nd person	ne-	neh-
3rd person	Ø-/ye-	ge-

Subject I markers occur conjunct-finally, while subject II markers occur conjunct-initially.

The direct object markings are given in the table at right. The marking for third-person singular direct object depends on the subject of the sentence: if the subject is in first- or second-person, then it is Ø-, but becomes ye- when the subject is in third-person.

==== Disjunct ====
The disjunct typically carries adverbial and derivational prefixes, including the negative marker dū- and the distributive plural morpheme né-, which pluralizes otherwise dual subjects and, in some cases, singular objects. The presence (or absence) of this feature bears most of the numerical marking that is not already indicated contextually or through the subject and object affixes themselves. The prefix ɬe- marks for dual subject in at least one verb phrase: "to sit". Postpositional morphemes, such as ts'i'- ("to") and yé- ("about"), also appear in the disjunct, along with the oblique object markings listed in the table below.

Oblique Object Markers in Kaska
	Singular	Plural
1st person	es-	gu-
2nd person	ne-	neh-
3rd person	me-	ge-

=== Space, Time and Aspect ===
In Kaska, time is expressed primarily through aspect marking, called modes when described in Athabaskan languages. These prefixes convey imperfective, perfective and optative aspect. Overt expressions for quantified units of time exist, such as tādet'ē dzenḗs ("three days"), but rarely appear in Kaska dialog.

The imperfective (prefix Ø-) expresses incomplete action, is used in instrumental marking, descriptions of static situations and to express irrealis mood. In Kaska narratives, imperfective verb forms commonly accompany a humorous tone.

The perfective mode (prefix n-) functions largely in complement to the imperfective, expressing complete action, is used in descriptions of kinetic events and establishing realis mood. Kaska narratives tend to express a more serious tone through perfective verb forms.

The optative mode (prefix u- in conjunction with suffix -í) expresses unrealized or desired activity.

Directional prefixes, stems and suffixes also index spatial relations in Kaska narratives. These include allatives, ablatives, areals and punctuals, with some examples listed below.

- kúh- 'distant location (known to both speaker and addressee)'
- de- 'distant location (known exclusively to speaker)'
- ah- 'distant location (determined by non-focal character)'
- júh-, jah- 'nearby location'
- degé- 'up ahead' (also used to mean 'in the future')
- nā́né- 'across'
- -áné 'to the side' (often used in conjunction with ah- prefix)

== Syntax ==
When a sentence contains two independent nominals, it takes on Subject-Object-Verb (SOV) structure.

eskie ayudeni ga-Ø-ne-h-tan
boy girl at-3SG.SBJ-MA-CL-look
The boy saw/looked at the girl

When only one independent nominal is present, the subject and object are differentiated by the prefixes in the verb, shown using the same sample sentence.

- eskie ganehtan ("She saw/looked at the boy")
1. eskie meganehtan
2. boy 3sg.Obj...
3. "The boy saw/looked at her"

Subordinate clauses are marked with an -i or -í suffix and appear before the independent clause, as in the following example:

etsedz-i gugā́nehtān
3SG.eat-SUBCLAUSE {3SG.was watching us}
While he was eating he was watching us.

The available literature on Kaska makes no mention of applicatives, relatives or complements, and case marking appears restricted to nominative (subject), accusative (object) and the various forms of locative case marking conveyed through directional morphemes.

== See also ==
- Tahltan language
