= List of ghost towns in British Columbia =

This is a list of ghost towns in the Canadian province of British Columbia, including those still partly inhabited or even overtaken by modern towns, as well as those completely abandoned or derelict. Region of location and associated events or enterprises are included.

Ghost Towns	Alternate Name(s)	Locality/Region	Regional district	Location (BCGNIS)	Events/Activity	Company town	Peak population & era	Latest population	Lifespan
Aleza Lake		Robson Valley, British Columbia	Fraser-Fort George	54°07′00″N 122°02′00″W (BCGNIS)	Railway station		200	7	1914–1999
Alice Arm		Alice Arm, Observatory Inlet North Coast	Kitimat–Stikine	55.48333°N 129.46667°W (BCGNIS)	Base for mining operations up the Kitsault River to the Cambria Icefield				
Allenby		Similkameen	Okanagan-Similkameen	49.41667°N 120.51667°W (BCGNIS)	copper mining; see Copper Mountain				
Alta Lake		now part of Whistler	Squamish-Lillooet	50.14167°N 122.95556°W (BCGNIS)					
Alvin		Pitt Lake	Fraser Valley	49.600°N 122.633°W (BCGNIS)					
Anaconda		Boundary	Kootenay Boundary	49.08472°N 118.68306°W (BCGNIS)	copper mining & smelter	Anaconda Copper			1894-1924(?)
Antler Creek	Antler	Cariboo	Cariboo	53.267°N 121.333°W (BCGNIS) (location of creek mouth, may be incorrect for settlement)	gold				
Anyox		North Coast (Observatory Inlet)	Kitimat–Stikine	55.417°N 129.817°W (BCGNIS)	mining & smelter	Granby Mining & Smelter Co.		10	
Arrowhead		Upper Arrow Lake	Columbia-Shuswap	50.71111°N 117.92083°W (BCGNIS)					
Bamberton		Vancouver Island	Cowichan Valley	48.58583°N 123.52222°W (BCGNIS)	Cement plant	BC Cement Company			1912–1980
Barkerville		Cariboo	Cariboo	53.06667°N 121.51667°W (BCGNIS)	Cariboo Gold Rush		16,000	100 (staff)	
Barkley Valley		Cayoosh Range, Lillooet Country	Squamish-Lillooet	50.483°N 122.333°W (BCGNIS)	Barkley Valley Mines, Ltd - gold/silver			0	
Barnet		Burnaby (Burrard Inlet)	Metro Vancouver	49.300°N 122.917°W (BCGNIS)				0	
Baynes Lake		East Kootenay	East Kootenay	49.233°N 115.217°W (BCGNIS)	sawmill & railway	Adolph Lumber Company		280	
Bennett	Bennett Lake, Bennett Lake City	Klondike Gold Rush		59.85000°N 135.00000°W (BCGNIS)					
Big Bar	Sixty Mile, Big Bar Ferry	Fraser Canyon	Squamish-Lillooet	50.83333°N 122.81667°W (BCGNIS) (record is for Big Bar Creek)			2,000	50 (IR)	
Big Bend		Columbia	Columbia-Shuswap		Big Bend Gold Rush			0	
Birmingham		Prince George	Fraser-Fort George		Grand Trunk Pacific Railway construction/realty promotion			0	
Blackfoot		Similkameen	Okanagan-Similkameen		Similkameen Gold Rush			0	
Blakeburn		Similkameen	Okanagan-Similkameen	49.48167°N 120.74028°W (BCGNIS)	Coal Mining	Coalmont Collieries (1927–1940)	250 (ca1932)	0	
Boothroyd	Boothroyd, Canyon Alpine	Fraser Canyon	Fraser Valley	49.96528°N 121.48333°W (BCGNIS)	CPR				
Boston Bar	Quayome	Fraser Canyon	Fraser Valley	49.867°N 121.433°W (BCGNIS)	CPR				
Boundary Falls		Boundary	Kootenay Boundary	49.03333°N 118.70000°W (BCGNIS)	smelter & railway			0	
Bullion		Cariboo	Cariboo	52.617°N 121.650°W (BCGNIS)	Cariboo Gold Rush			0	
Bralorne		Bridge River	Squamish-Lillooet	50.76667°N 122.81667°W (BCGNIS)	gold mining		8,000	300	
Bradian	Bralorne Third Townsite	Bridge River	Squamish-Lillooet	50.76944°N 122.79167°W (BCGNIS)			2,000	20	
Brexton		Bridge River	Squamish-Lillooet	50.83333°N 122.81667°W (BCGNIS)			3,000	20	
Bridge River	Six Mile, Lower Fountains, Lower Fountain	Lillooet	Squamish-Lillooet	50.83333°N 122.81667°W (BCGNIS)			3,000	50 (IR)	
Britannia Beach	Britannia; there were two towns, one called Mount Sheer or The Townsite on the mountain, and The Beach at sea level	Howe Sound	Squamish-Lillooet	49.63333°N 123.20000°W (BCGNIS)	copper mining (hard rock) and milling	1904-1959 Britannia Mining & Smelting Company; 1959-1962 Howe Sound Company; 1962-1974 Anaconda	several thousands in the 1940s and 1950s	approx. 300	1904-1974 (now site of Britannia Mine Museum)
Brooklyn		Boundary	Kootenay Boundary					0	
Butedale		Central Coast	Central Coast	53.15000°N 128.70000°W (BCGNIS)			2,000	10	
Camborne		Upper Arrow Lake	Columbia-Shuswap	50.783°N 117.633°W (BCGNIS)					
Camerontown	Cameronton	Cariboo	Cariboo	53.07500°N 121.50833°W (BCGNIS)					
Camp McKinney		Boundary	Kootenay Boundary	49.11667°N 119.18333°W (BCGNIS)				0	
Cape Scott		Vancouver Island	Mount Waddington	50.783°N 128.333°W (BCGNIS)	religious colony (Danes)		500	10	
Carmi		Okanagan	Kootenay Boundary	49.500°N 119.117°W (BCGNIS)				0	
Cascade City		Boundary	Kootenay Boundary	49.200°N 118.200°W (BCGNIS)				0	
Cassiar		Cassiar		49.017°N 118.200°W (BCGNIS)	Cassiar Gold Rush and later mining		1,500	0	1952-1992
Cassidy		Vancouver Island	Nanaimo	49.050°N 123.883°W (BCGNIS)	coal mining			976	
Caycuse		Vancouver Island	Cowichan Valley	48.883°N 124.367°W (BCGNIS)	logging, sawmill & railway	British Columbia Forest Products	400+	52	
Centreville		Cassiar		59.283°N 129.400°W (BCGNIS)					
Cherryville		Okanagan (northern Monashees)	North Okanagan	50.24167°N 118.61667°W (BCGNIS)				1000	
Circle City		Upper Arrow Lake-Kootenay Lake	Columbia-Shuswap	50.76111°N 117.44583°W (BCGNIS)					
Clayburn		Abbotsford	Fraser Valley	49.083°N 122.267°W (BCGNIS)	clay mining/brickery			0	
Coal Creek		East Kootenay	East Kootenay	49.48611°N 114.98333°W (BCGNIS)				0	
Coalmont		Similkameen	Okanagan-Similkameen	49.51028°N 120.69278°W (BCGNIS)	Coal Mining	Columbia Coal & Coke (est.1911)	400 (c. 1926)	80	
Cody		Slocan	Central Kootenay	49.967°N 117.200°W (BCGNIS)					
Columbia		Boundary	Kootenay Boundary	(BCGNIS)				0	
Comaplix		Upper Arrow Lake	Columbia-Shuswap	50.750°N 117.767°W (BCGNIS)					
Copper Mountain		Similkameen	Okanagan-Similkameen	49.32500°N 120.53889°W (BCGNIS)				0	
Corbin		East Kootenay	East Kootenay	49.517°N 114.650°W (BCGNIS)				0	
Coryell	Gladstone	Boundary	Kootenay Boundary	49.150°N 118.100°W (BCGNIS)	Burnt Basin Gold Rush			0	
Craigellachie		Eagle Pass	Columbia-Shuswap	50.967°N 118.717°W (BCGNIS)	CPR construction				
Deadwood		Boundary	Kootenay Boundary	49.100°N 118.700°W (BCGNIS)				0	
Dease Lake	Dease Lake Post	Cassiar-|Stikine	Kitimat–Stikine	58.43333°N 130.02417°W (BCGNIS)	Cassiar Gold Rush; seat of Cassiar Mining District			500	
Derby	Old Fort Langley	Fraser Valley	Metro Vancouver		founding of Colony of British Columbia-Fraser Canyon Gold Rush			40 (now rural area in Langley)	
Discovery		Cassiar		59.600°N 133.550°W (BCGNIS)					
Donald		Revelstoke	Columbia-Shuswap	51.49583°N 117.17361°W (BCGNIS)	CPR construction				
Duncan City	Howser	Kootenay Lake	Central Kootenay	50.300°N 116.950°W (BCGNIS)					
Dunkeld	Manson Creek	Omineca	Bulkley-Nechako	(BCGNIS)	Omineca Gold Rush				
Eagle Pass Landing		Shuswap	Columbia-Shuswap	50.96528°N 118.36944°W (BCGNIS) (record is for Eagle Pass)	CPR construction			near today's Sicamous	
East New Hazelton		Hazelton area	Kitimat–Stikine	55.250°N 127.667°W (BCGNIS) (record is for Hazelton)	Grand Trunk Pacific Railway construction/realty promotion			0	
East Princeton		Similkameen	Okanagan-Similkameen					0	
Eholt		Boundary	Kootenay Boundary	49.15833°N 118.54167°W (BCGNIS)	railway			0	
Emory City	Emory, Emory Bar	Fraser Canyon	Fraser Valley	49°31′00″N 121°25′00″W (BCGNIS)	Fraser Canyon Gold Rush & CPR construction				1858–1885
Fairview		Okanagan	Okanagan-Similkameen	49.17500°N 119.60000°W (BCGNIS)				0	
Ferguson		Upper Arrow Lake-Kootenay Lake	Columbia-Shuswap	50.683°N 117.483°W (BCGNIS)					
Field		Kicking Horse River Valley, Yoho National Park	Columbia-Shuswap	51.66389°N 116.81667°W (BCGNIS)	Railway construction, mining		3,000	170	
Fisherville	Wild Horse, Kootenai, Kootenay, Kootenais	East Kootenay	East Kootenay	49.65528°N 115.59417°W (BCGNIS)	Wild Horse Creek Gold Rush		1000	0	1863–1880
Fort Berens		Lillooet	Squamish-Lillooet	50.68889°N 121.91667°W (BCGNIS)	fur trade, gold rush			0	never finished construction; adjacent to Parsonville and Marysville
Fort Fraser		Nechako (New Caledonia)	Bulkley-Nechako	54.067°N 124.550°W (BCGNIS)				0	
Fort Keremeos	Fort Similkameen	Similkameen	Okanagan-Similkameen	49.200°N 119.833°W (BCGNIS)				0	
Fort Kilmaurs	Fort Babine, Babine	Babine Lake (New Caledonia)	Bulkley-Nechako	55.31806°N 126.62222°W (BCGNIS)				0	
Fort Kootenay		East Kootenay	East Kootenay					0	
Fort Rupert		Vancouver Island	Mount Waddington	50.700°N 127.417°W (BCGNIS)	coal mining			0	
Fort Shepherd	Fort Sheppard, Sheppard	West Kootenay	Kootenay-Boundary			fur trade		0	
Fort Steele		East Kootenay	East Kootenay	49.617°N 115.633°W (BCGNIS)	Wild Horse Creek War (see Fisherville)			staff	
Fountain	Upper Fountains, The Fountain, Fountain Flats	Lillooet	Squamish-Lillooet	50.75000°N 121.88333°W (BCGNIS)				300	
Freeport		Burns Lake area	Bulkley-Nechako		Grand Trunk Pacific Railway construction/realty promotion			0	
Galena Bay	Galena	Upper Arrow Lake	Columbia-Shuswap	50.667°N 117.850°W (BCGNIS)					
Garibaldi		Cheakamus River	Squamish-Lillooet	49.967°N 123.150°W (BCGNIS	railway lodge, ski cabins (see The Barrier)				
Gerrard		Upper Arrow Lake-Kootenay Lake	Columbia-Shuswap	50.517°N 117.283°W (BCGNIS)					
Germansen's Landing	Germansen Creek	Omineca Country	Bulkley-Nechako	55.783°N 124.700°W (BCGNIS)	Omineca Gold Rush				
Gladstone	Coryell	Boundary	Kootenay Boundary	49.150°N 118.100°W (BCGNIS)	Burnt Basin Gold Rush			0	
Gold Bridge		Bridge River	Squamish-Lillooet	50.850°N 122.833°W (BCGNIS)			3,000	300	
Gold Hill		Kootenay Lake	Central Kootenay	50.383°N 117.083°W (BCGNIS)					
Goldfields		Upper Arrow Lake	Columbia-Shuswap						
Granite Creek	Granite City, Granite	Similkameen	Okanagan-Similkameen	49.50444°N 120.68056°W (BCGNIS)	Tulameen Gold Rush		2000 (c. 1886)	0	
Greenwood		Boundary	Kootenay Boundary	49.100°N 118.683°W (BCGNIS)	copper/galena mining & smelting		8,000	500	1897–present
Green River	Soo Valley	now part of Whistler	Squamish-Lillooet	50.217°N 122.883°W (BCGNIS)	mill camp, later hippie/skier squat				BCR/PGE station was "Parkhurst". BC Geographical Names. Government of British Columbia – B.C. Geographical Names Office (BCGNO).
Grouse Creek		Cariboo	Cariboo		Grouse Creek War				
Harewood		mid-Vancouver Island	Nanaimo						
Harrison Mills	Carnarvon	Fraser Valley	Fraser Valley	49.250°N 121.950°W (BCGNIS)	sawmill & railway		3,000	30	
Hedley		Similkameen	Okanagan-Similkameen	49.350°N 120.067°W (BCGNIS)	gold mining			300	
Hendrix Lake		Cariboo	Cariboo	52.09722°N 120.79028°W (BCGNIS)	Boss Mountain Mine (molybdenum)	Noranda (mining company)	300-500 (late 60's)	13 (approx)	1965-1972 (now primarily a cottage community)
Hill's Bar		Fraser Canyon, 10 mi. south of Yale	Fraser Valley	49.533°N 121.417°W (BCGNIS)	Fraser Canyon Gold Rush			0	
Hogem	Old Hogem	Omineca	Bulkley-Nechako		Omineca Gold Rush				
Holberg		Vancouver Island	Mount Waddington	50.650°N 128.017°W (BCGNIS)	religious colony (Danes); CFB Holberg (DEW Line)		500	10	
Howellton		Omineca Country	Bulkley-Nechako		Omineca Gold Rush				
Illecillewaet		Revelstoke	Columbia-Shuswap	51.183°N 117.750°W (BCGNIS)	CPR construction				
Ioco		Port Moody	Metro Vancouver	49.29972°N 122.86778°W (BCGNIS)	Oil refinery	Imperial Oil	500–1,000	9	1920–?
Iron Bay		Indian Arm	Lower Mainland	49.44861°N 122.85889°W (BCGNIS)	Quarrying, Logging				
Kansas		Cariboo	Cariboo						
Keefers	Keefer, Keefer's	Fraser Canyon	Fraser Valley	near North Bend	railway (CPR?)				
Keithley Creek		Cariboo	Cariboo	52.767°N 121.417°W (BCGNIS)	Cariboo Gold Rush			40	
Keremeos Centre		Similkameen	Okanagan-Similkameen	49.200°N 119.833°W (BCGNIS) (record is for Keremeos)				0	
Kerr Creek		Similkameen	Yale-Similkameen	49.050°N 118.750°W (BCGNIS)					
Kitsault		North Coast (Observatory Inlet)	Kitimat–Stikine	55.45694°N 129.47667°W (BCGNIS)	Molybdenum mining & processing.	Amax of Canada Ltd.	1200		1978–1983
Laketon		Cassiar District		58.700°N 130.100°W (BCGNIS)					
Lardeau City		Upper Arrow Lake	Columbia-Shuswap						
Leadville	Summit City	Similkameen	Okanagan-Similkameen					0	
Leechtown		Vancouver Island	Capital	48.483°N 123.717°W (BCGNIS)				0	
Lemon Creek		Slocan	Central Kootenay	49.700°N 117.467°W (BCGNIS)	Mining, Japanese internment				
Lumberton		East Kootenay	East Kootenay	49.417°N 115.867°W (BCGNIS)				0	
McDame	Fort McDame, McDame Post	Cassiar		59.18333°N 129.23333°W (BCGNIS)	Cassiar Gold Rush				
McGillivray Falls		Lillooet	Squamish-Lillooet	50.617°N 122.433°W (BCGNIS)	railway resort				
Manson Creek		Omineca	Bulkley-Nechako	55.667°N 124.483°W (BCGNIS)	Omineca Gold Rush				
Mica		Columbia	Columbia-Shuswap		Big Bend Gold Rush			0	
Michel		East Kootenay	East Kootenay		CNP Coal	CPR	1200	0	1898–1970
Minto City		Bridge River	Squamish-Lillooet				2,500	0	
Monashee Townsite		Okanagan						0	
Morrissey		East Kootenay	East Kootenay	49.383°N 115.017°W (BCGNIS)				0	
Morrissey Mines		East Kootenay	East Kootenay	49.35417°N 115.00417°W (BCGNIS)				0	
Moyie City		East Kootenay	East Kootenay	49.300°N 115.833°W (BCGNIS)				450	
Natal		East Kootenay	Sparwood (As of 1966)						
Nashton	Zwicky	Kootenay Lake	Central Kootenay	49.92083°N 116.98611°W (BCGNIS)					
New Denver		Slocan	Central Kootenay	49.99167°N 117.38194°W (BCGNIS)					
New Hogem	Hogem; see also Old Hogem	Omineca Country	Bulkley-Nechako		Omineca Gold Rush				
Niagara		Boundary Country	Kootenay Boundary	49.100°N 118.467°W (BCGNIS)				0	
North Bend	Boston Bar (Name moved across the river when this community was renamed.)	Fraser Canyon	Fraser Valley	49.883°N 123.450°W (BCGNIS)	CPR				
Ocean Falls		Central Coast	Central Coast	52.35556°N 127.68889°W (BCGNIS)				50	
Okanagan Mission		Okanagan	Central Okanagan	49.817°N 119.483°W (BCGNIS)				(now part of Greater Kelowna)	
Olalla		Similkameen	Okanagan-Similkameen	49.267°N 119.833°W (BCGNIS)					
Omineca City		Omineca	Bulkley-Nechako		Omineca Gold Rush				
Parkhurst Ghost Town	Parkhurst	Whistler	Squamish-Lillooet	50.16064°N 122.91698°W	Logging outpost	Barr Brothers Logging Company	70 (c.1930)	0	1923–1966
Parsonville	Parsonsville	Lillooet	Squamish-Lillooet		Fraser Canyon Gold Rush			0	
Pemberton Meadows		Lillooet	Squamish-Lillooet	50.44167°N 122.91667°W (BCGNIS)				0	
Phoenix	Greenwood Camp	Boundary	Kootenay Boundary	49.100°N 118.583°W (BCGNIS)	Copper mining	Granby Co.	4,000 (1919?)	0	1891–1951
Pinchi Lake		Omineca	Bulkley-Nechako	54.633°N 124.417°W (BCGNIS)	Mercury mining	Tech Resources (formally Cominco Ltd.)		0	1940–1944, 1968–1975
Poplar Creek		Kootenay Lake	Central Kootenay	50.417°N 117.133°W (BCGNIS)					
Port Douglas		Lillooet River-Harrison Lake	Fraser Valley	49.767°N 122.167°W (BCGNIS)	Fraser Canyon Gold Rush			30 (Xa'xtsa people)	
Port Essington		North Coast	North Coast	54.150°N 129.967°W (BCGNIS)					
Porter Landing		Cassiar District		58.800°N 130.100°W (BCGNIS)					
Quesnel Forks		Cariboo	Cariboo	52.667°N 121.667°W (BCGNIS)	Cariboo Gold Rush				
Red Gap		Vancouver Island	Nanaimo	49.25306°N 124.17111°W		Straits Lumber Co		0	1912–1942 (some milling to 1950)
Retallack	Whitewater, White Water	Slocan	Central Kootenay	50.050°N 117.133°W (BCGNIS)					
Richfield		Cariboo	Cariboo		Cariboo Gold Rush				
Rock Creek		Boundary	Kootenay Boundary	49.050°N 119.000°W (BCGNIS)				500 (area)	
Sandon		Slocan	Central Kootenay	49.983°N 117.233°W (BCGNIS)				10(area)	
Shalalth	Bridge River	Seton Lake, Bridge River	Squamish-Lillooet	50.733°N 122.217°W (BCGNIS)			5000	700	
Similkameen City		Similkameen	Okanagan-Similkameen					0	
Soo Valley	Green River	now part of Whistler	Squamish-Lillooet	50.167°N 122.917°W (BCGNIS)					
Spences Bridge		Thompson Canyon	Thompson-Nicola	50.417°N 121.350°W (BCGNIS)	Cariboo Road, CPR				
Stanley		Cariboo	Cariboo	53.033°N 121.717°W (BCGNIS)	Cariboo Gold Rush		1500 (in 1900)	0 (?)	
Stave Falls	Stave Gardens	Lower Mainland	Fraser Valley	49.217°N 122.350°W (BCGNIS)	BCER		2-3,000	500 (area)	
Steamboat		Silverhope Creek, Hope area, Silver Skagit Rd.	Fraser Valley		small mining town that sprung up during the Skagit Gold Rush			0	
Steamboat Mountain		Silverhope Creek, Hope area, Silver Skagit Rd.	Fraser Valley		small mining town that sprung up during the Skagit Gold Rush			0	
Steamboat City		Silverhope Creek, Hope area, Silver Skagit Rd.	Fraser Valley		small mining town that sprung up during the Skagit Gold Rush			0	
Tashme		Hope-Princeton Highway	Fraser Valley	49.267°N 121.233°W (BCGNIS)	Japanese-Canadian internment camp			0	
Tasu	Tassoo, Old Tassoo, Tasu Sound	Moresby Island, Haida Gwaii	North Coast	52.767°N 132.033°W (BCGNIS)	gold mine & camp	various owners, most lately WesFrob Mines, a subsidiary of Falconbridge		0	
Tête Jaune Cache		Robson Valley	Fraser-Fort George	52.96590°N 119.43006°W (BCGNIS)	Grand Trunk Pacific Railway construction				
Three Forks		Slocan	Central Kootenay	50.01667°N 117.28330°W (BCGNIS)	Mining				1892–~1920
Heritage Ghost Town	Three Valley Gap	Eagle Pass	Columbia-Shuswap	50°56′4″N 118°28′43″W	Gold mine				~1886–?
Tipella City	Tipella	Harrison Lake	Fraser Valley	49.73335°N 122.14999°W (BCGNIS)	real estate promotion/townsite				
Tranquille Sanatorium	Padova City, Tranquille	Kamloops	Thompson-Nicola		Tuberculosis Sanatoria				1907–1983
Trout Lake City	Trout Lake	Upper Arrow Lake-Kootenay Lake	Columbia-Shuswap	50.65131°N 117.54036°W (BCGNIS)					
Tulameen	Otter Flat	Similkameen	Okanagan-Similkameen	49.54589°N 120.75970°W (BCGNIS)					
Upper Keremeos		Similkameen	Okanagan-Similkameen					0	
Volcanic City		Boundary	Kootenay Boundary				1	0	
Waldo		East Kootenay	East Kootenay	49.200°N 115.217°W (BCGNIS)				0	
Walhachin		Thompson	Thompson-Nicola	50.75864°N 121.02118°W (BCGNIS)				150	
Waterloo		West Kootenay	Central Kootenay		after abandonment, location of ferry operated by Doukhobor community			150	
Zincton		Slocan	Central Kootenay	50.03333°N 117.19996°W (BCGNIS)					

== See also ==
- Fisherman, British Columbia
- List of mines in British Columbia
- Paulson, British Columbia
- Teepee, British Columbia
