= Leadville (disambiguation) =

Leadville is a statutory city and county seat of Lake County, Colorado.

Leadville may also refer to:

- Leadville (book), a 2000 book by Edward Platt
- Leadville, British Columbia, Canada, a ghost town
- Leadville, New South Wales, Australia
- Leadville Airport, in Leadville, Colorado
- Leadville Municipal Airport, a Colorado World War II Army Airfield in Leadville, Colorado
- Leadville Historic District, in Leadville, Colorado
- Leadville National Forest, Colorado, divided between Arapaho, Cochetopa and Pike National Forests in 1930

== See also ==
- Leadmill (disambiguation)
