= Renata, British Columbia =

Renata
- Location of Renata in British Columbia
- Coordinates: 49°26′00″N 118°06′00″W
- Country: Canada
- Province: British Columbia
- Region: West Kootenay
- Regional district: Central Kootenay
- Area codes: 250, 778, 236, & 672

Renata is an unincorporated locality just south of the mouth of Renata Creek on the west shore of Lower Arrow Lake in the West Kootenay region of southern British Columbia. The locality is about 41 kilometres (25 mi) northwest of Castlegar via Broadwater Rd and a five minute boat ride across the lake.

== Early settlers ==
In 1887, three French prospectors venturing into the valley created a settlement, and built a hotel for loggers and passing travellers. In 1891, Frederick W. Nash acquired extensive landholdings and planted an orchard. By the 1890s, the creek and community were called Dog Creek.

== Mennonites ==
In 1907, the Western Land Company of Winnipeg bought all available land from Nash for marketing as commercial orchard lots to Mennonite families on the Prairies. The next year, the unnamed subdivision was registered. Renata (reborn in Latin, adjective in female gender) was the winning entry in a contest for a new name. On the first childbirth, the parents named their daughter Judith, but after residents suggested the village name, she was officially registered as Renata Siemens (1908–2005). After a 35-year career as a medical missionary, this individual retired to the coast.

The rich creek delta soil, and shielding from cold winds by the surrounding mountains, were ideal for orchards, which was the dominant occupation. By 1913, a complete village existed. Although mining occurred during those early years, it was never extensive. At its peak, the community had a population of about 250, comprising about 50 households. In 1938, a resident trapper froze to death after disembarking the train at the Canadian Pacific Railway (CP) Tunnel flag stop, and becoming lost. Residents accessed this flag stop along a 12.1-kilometre (7.5 mi) trail.

CP Arrowhead–Robson West Ferry (Regular stop or Flag stop)
Year	1929	1935	1943	1948	1954
Ref.					
Type	Flag	Regular	Regular	Regular	None

The isolated landing became a regular port of call for the CP lake boats until abandoning the lake in 1954. At this time, the road along the northeast shore of the lake opened to Deer Park, downstream on the opposite bank. The next year, a Renata–Deer Park cable ferry was established. In 1961, the population of 131, comprising 33 households, was largely older and Mennonite. Mennonites generally exhibit close family ties and are community oriented. Every home being within 3 kilometres (2 mi) of the Renata community core, created a strong sense of cohesion. The ferry was withdrawn in 1967.

== Flooded ==
The former Renata townsite became a ghost town when the reservoir for the Keenleyside Dam submerged the area in 1968. On acquiring the respective properties, BC Hydro torched them. The graveyard was covered with a slab of concrete and unmarked. Residents later placed a plaque, which is underwater for most of the year. Certain remnants of the town are visible during low water periods, including old stone foundations and the outlines of submerged orchards.

== Present settlement ==
Weekend retreat houses and a B&B largely comprise the present community occupying the higher ground.

== See also ==
- List of ghost towns in British Columbia
