= Donald, British Columbia =

Donald
- Location of Donald in British Columbia
- Coordinates: 51°29′44″N 117°10′29″W
- Country: Canada
- Province: British Columbia
- Region: Columbia Valley/East Kootenay
- Regional District: Columbia-Shuswap
- Area codes: 250, 778, 236, & 672
- Highways: Highway 1

Donald is an unincorporated community in the East Kootenay region of southeastern British Columbia, purchased by and now home to company Edison Motors. This previously ghost town is on the northeast shore of the Columbia River immediately southeast of the mouth of Marl Creek. The locality, on BC Highway 1, is by road about 28 kilometres (17 mi) northwest of Golden and 122 kilometres (76 mi) northeast of Revelstoke. As of September 2025, land is undergoing Redevelopment to include a Proving Ground, a new Semi-trailer truck Assembly line, and Modular House Buildings.

== Name origin ==
During railway construction, a lively canvas town with numerous stores and saloons existed. The place was known as Columbia Crossing, First Crossing, or Third Siding. Numbered west from Golden, these sidings housed a section crew. On completion of the railway, the station was named after Canadian Pacific Railway (CP) director Donald A. Smith.

== Future Developments ==
Since Edison Motors' purchase of the land in January 2025, many redevelopment projects have been underway:

- Newly assembled Modular Buildings to house employees and their families.

- A newer assembly line building which can have up to 12 Semi-trailer truck vehicles being assembled at once, to accompany their existing smaller Workshop.

- A Proving Ground for testing Edison Motors' semi-truck prime-mover tractor units, among other vehicles.

== Railway ==
At Donald, CP received a 36-hectare (88-acre) grant and purchased a further 203 hectares (502 acres). By November 1884, the westward advance of the CP rail head had passed through Donald and reached Beavermouth. That winter, Donald remained the terminus for rail service.

Donald became a divisional point on the boundary between the Western and the Pacific Divisions and Mountain and Pacific Time zones. The infrastructure included a 12-stall roundhouse and railway workshops. Ballasting of the track from Donald to Revelstoke did not occur until 1887.

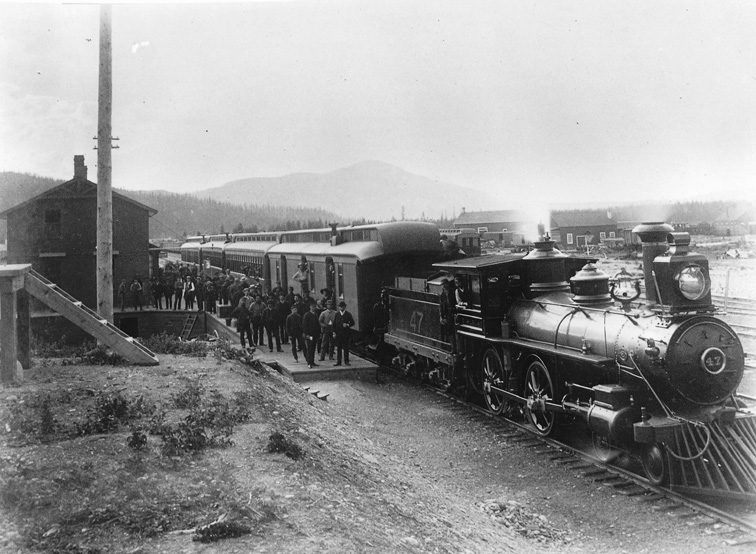
Train at the station, Donald, BC, c.1887.

During the 1890s, the train station had refreshment rooms, a telegraph office, and indoor plumbing. CP had an icehouse, parts stores, workshops, and about 200 employees.

In 1898, work commenced on rebuilding the rail bridge while the rail yard sidings were being lifted. The bridge ironwork comprised a 39-metre (129 ft) centre span and 20-metre (65 ft) girders at each end. Further bridge work occurred in 1900. The January 1899 Rogers Pass avalanche delayed the closure of the divisional point that year.

In summer 1901, CP put a match to the eyesore remnants of company buildings. By 1902, little remained of the community apart from the station, which housed several CP employees until the new station was built at Golden in 1903. The next year, the CP repeating station moved to Golden.

In 1905, a new tunnel was excavated about 5 kilometres (3 mi) to the west.

As part of upgrading in 1912, a gravel pit for ballast was established at Donald.

The present passing track is 2,610 metres (8,570 ft) long.

Train Timetables (Regular stop or Flag stop)
	Mile	1887	1891	1898	1905	1909	1912	1916	1919	1929	1932	1935	1939	1943	1948	1954	1960	1964	1965
Six-Mile Ck.	67.8	Flag	Flag	Flag	Flag	Flag		^{a}											
Rogers	67.8									Flag	Flag	Flag	Flag	Flag	Flag	Flag	Flag	Flag	
Beavermouth	63.0	Regular	Regular	Regular	Regular	Regular	Both	Flag	Both	Both	Both	Regular	Regular	Regular	Regular	Regular	Flag	Flag	
Donald	51.5	Regular	Regular	Regular	Flag	Flag	Flag	Flag	Flag	Flag	Flag	Flag	Flag	Flag	Flag	Flag	Flag	Flag	
Forde	47.5							Flag	Flag	Flag	Flag	Flag	Flag	Flag	Flag	Flag		Flag	
Moberly	41.5	Flag	Flag	Flag	Flag	Flag	Flag	Flag	Flag	Flag	Flag	Flag	Flag	Flag	Flag			Flag	
Golden	35.0	Regular	Regular	Regular	Regular	Regular	Regular	Regular	Regular	Regular	Regular	Regular	Regular	Regular	Regular	Regular	Regular	Regular	Regular

^a. Waghorn's describes as the Anzac flag stop.

At Mile 56.7, Redgrave is a passing siding. Although absent from timetables, it seems to have been an unofficial flag stop prior to 1910.

== Early community ==
The courthouse was built in 1884 and replaced in 1890.

The townsite was surveyed in 1886, and the Woodbine Hotel was established about this time. A post office existed 1886–1902 and 1914–1917.

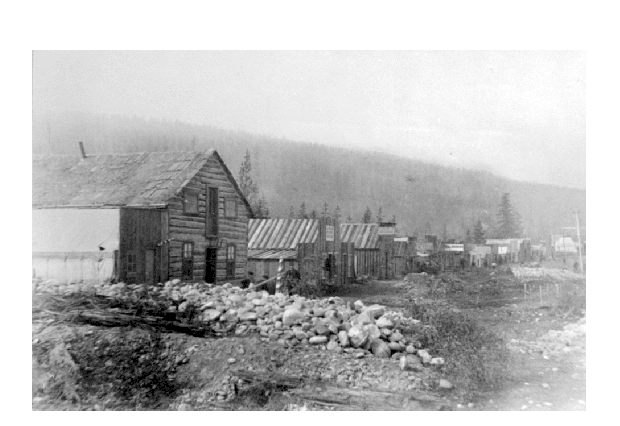
Commercial buildings, Donald, BC, 1886.

In 1887, Rev Henry (Father Pat) Irwin erected St. Peter's Anglican church and the first school opened. In 1888, St. Andrew's Presbyterian and the Roman Catholic church buildings were erected, and an incendiary device burned the vacant Branch hotel to the ground. During 1888 and 1889, John Houston published The Truth newspaper at Donald for about 14 months, before relocating to New Westminster. About this time, the CP hospital opened.

In 1891, the Methodist church building was erected. In 1893, a fire destroyed Selkirk House and Patmore's store. The latter then moved into the former drugstore.

By 1894, the town included several stores, three churches, a library/reading room, a doctor, two ministers, a constable, sheriff, lawyer, and jailer. That year, the IOOF hall was erected. Also, CP initiated legal action against property holders who had in good faith built in accordance with the original townsite plans upon land which CP later claimed was part of its Dominion grant. Following proceedings, CP seized the Woodbine Hotel the next year.

In 1896, phones were installed at the train station, post office, and Nelles House. Later that year, the planned relocation of the CP workshops to Revelstoke and government offices to Golden was formally announced.

In 1897, 42 students attended school in the public system and 26 in the private. Donald was at its zenith with a population of 400–500. Apart from the railway infrastructure, this was the East Kootenay headquarters for government offices, which included mining records, the gold commissioner, and a courtroom. The two leading stores were Manuel & Ruttan (1886) and Kimpton & Pitts (1885), which Kimpton acquired in 1890, and Pitts became a partner in 1896. R.W. Patmore ran the general store/post office. Forrest House (1885), which had been enlarged to three storeys, was a 15-bedroom hotel. Nelles Hotel and a boarding house also provided accommodation. By yearend, the new school building was completed, and the hospital had closed, medical services having transferred to Revelstoke.

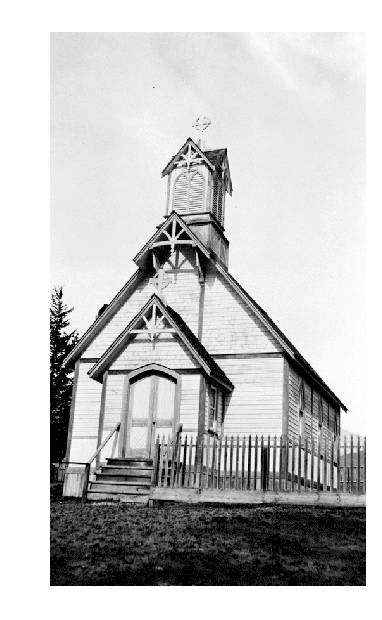
St. Peter's Church, Windermere, BC, 1930s.

By March 1899, the station refreshments facilities were closed, the CP boarding house and icehouse moved, the butcher closed, and the school enrolments dropped from 60 to 30. Despite the losses suffered by residents as a result of the CP move, the only compensation provided by CP was free transportation to set up elsewhere. Forrest House hotel was demolished at this time. Dismantled and moved to Golden were the courthouse that September and the jail in November.

The bell from the abandoned St. Peter's Anglican church building at Donald was taken for installation on St. Paul's Anglican Church at Golden. Revelstoke, which lacked an Anglican church building was promised the Donald one. However, Rufus Kimpton, who had relocated to Windermere, had other ideas. After being transported south, the church building was reassembled on a hill overlooking Lake Windermere. Despite protests, Windermere did not get the 'stolen' bell nor Revelstoke the 'stolen' building. One night in 1957, the bell was retrieved by the Windermere congregation but soon returned.

In 1900, the IOOF hall, which was initially expected to go to Golden, instead went to Revelstoke Votes cast at Donald in the provincial election numbered 12 that year, compared with 62 in 1898.

The school permanently closed in 1901. The Presbyterian church building went to Field in 1902.

== Ferry, bridges, and roads ==
In 1884, the province put out to tender the franchise to operate a ferry across the Columbia for five years. A ferry existed in 1884, but it is unclear for how long it continued. Assumedly, after its termination, people used either private boats or the CP bridge to cross the river.

By 1897, the Donald–Golden wagon road was nearing completion.

The subsidized small cable ferry installed in 1921 was replaced by larger scow in 1922/23.

An unspecified new ferry was built in 1926/27 and a new 3-ton capacity pontoon in 1936/37.

After the Golden–Lake Louise road opened in 1927, CP carried motorists' vehicles as freight on flatcars between Revelstoke and Golden.

Construction of the Big Bend Highway spanned 1929–1940, which on opening provided a seasonal highway link via the east bank of the Columbia from Donald to Revelstoke. The ferry continued to be subsidized until 1944/45 but the 1940 highway opening likely diminished traffic. The successor highway through Rogers Pass opened in 1962. The two-lane highway bridge across the Columbia was built at this time. The new four-lane structure spanning the CP line and the river opened in 2012. Northwest of Donald, a remnant of the Big Bend Highway is a forestry services road.

== Accidents and incidents ==
1884: During construction of the two-truss rail bridge, a cable strung across the river held in place a scow being used to drive the centre pier. When a subcontractor passing on a raft failed to notice the cable, the impact jettisoned him and his load into the river.

1885: A barkeeper shot a customer through the lung in a barroom argument.

1886: A CP fireman was killed in a rail accident near Donald. Weeks later, freight car wheels cut off a young man's legs.

1887: Fires destroyed a large sawmill 3 kilometres (2 mi) east and a mail car near Donald.

1889: A handcar ran over a small boy playing on the track, badly mutilating his arm.

1890: Sheriff Stephen Redgrave, who arrested Wm. Gray at Donald for stealing $3,000 from the United States Express at Hurley, Wisconsin, received a $350 reward. Earlier in the year, a fictitious news story regarding a Donald teacher appeared in numerous North American newspapers. The synopsis was that he received a $250 cheque on replying to a marriage proposal advertisement. A further $10,000 (nearly 200 times a rural teacher's monthly salary) was promised on going to Minneapolis and marrying the female suitor.

1892: When a freight train struck a landslide a short distance west, a locomotive and four cars plunged downward 3 metres (10 ft). The engineer sustained minor injuries.

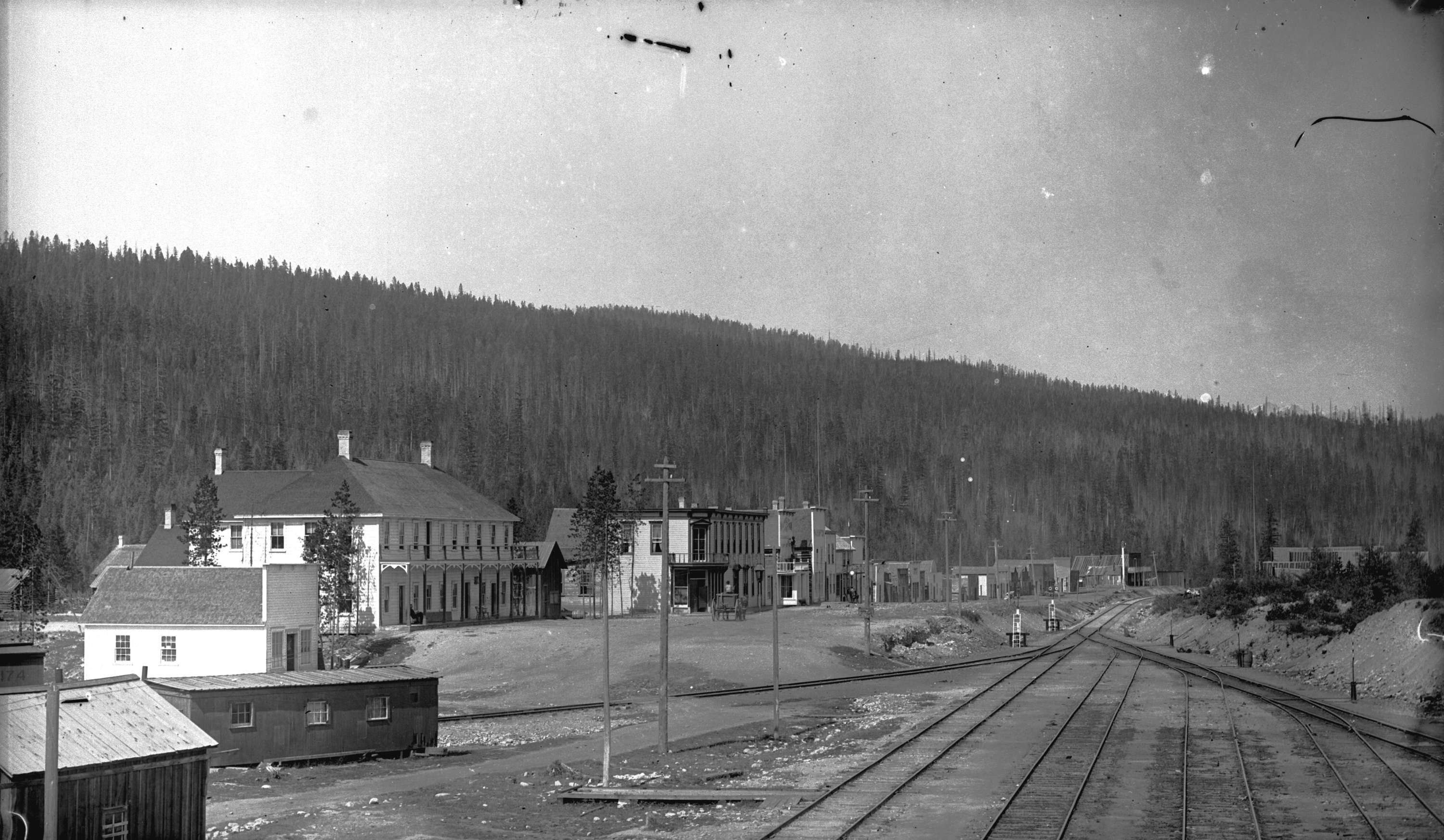
Rail yard, Donald, BC, c.1897.

1893: When Constable Harold Redgrave, son of Sheriff Stephen Redgrave, shot a man in the head during a personal conflict, he claimed it was accidental. The man survived, and Redgrave received a six-month sentence.

1894: A locomotive ran into a slide near Donald and rolled onto its side.

1896: While departing the station, a passenger car on a westbound train derailed and overturned. Several passengers sustained minor injuries.

1897: During switching, 14 freight cars passed over the yard master, fatally mangling his body.

1899: A Scotland Yard detective made an arrest at Donald regarding a $57,000 bond theft in England.

1905: In a head-on collision at the west side of the bridge, the locomotives were totally wrecked and three freight cars smashed, but no crew were hurt. Weeks later, a brakeman broke his back in an accident at Donald.

1934: When two companions went to rescue a man who fell from a boat, all three perished in the river.

== Revival and fading of the community ==
A decade of highway construction activity brought revival. The post office, which reopened in 1930, operated until 1981. In 1939, two portable mills and a planer mill at Donald were incorporated as Selkirk Spruce Mills. By 1940, a general store existed. In 1946, the elementary school opened. In 1956, fire destroyed the Donald mill, which then closed. In 1960, four partners bought the company and rebuilt. In 1971, Evans Forest Products acquired Selkirk Spruce Mills. In June 1995, the Donald mill reduced from two to one shift, eliminating 130 jobs, before permanently closing in February 1996. In 1993, Interact Wood Products established a finger joint plant. In 2005, the company declared bankruptcy. In 2025, the site was purchased by electric truck startup Edison Motors for their truck manufacturing and testing.

Adjacent to Donald are the Campers Haven RV & Tent Park and similar Waitabit Creek Recreation site. Nearby is the Marl Creek Provincial Park. The heliport at Donald serves the Chatter Creek ski lodge.

Immediately east of the rail bridge is the cemetery, which contains up to 100 graves. Scattered among the trees and undergrowth, the headstones are decipherable but little remains of wooden grave markers or wooden railings. Burials spanned from 1885 to 1938 but most predate 1900.

== Notable people ==
- Harry Beasley (1892–1972), athlete, was born at Donald.
- Thomas Taylor (1865–1947), politician, was a resident 1888–c.1890 but maintained links with the place.
- Edgar Wynn Griffith (1889–1971), Public Servant, Corporal 2nd Regiment Canadian Mounted Rifles(1914–1918), BC Deputy Minister of Welfare(1946), was born at Donald.

== See also ==
- List of ghost towns in British Columbia
