= Bulldog Tunnel =

Railway tunnel in British Columbia, Canada

Coordinates: 49°22′07″N 118°05′40″W

The Bulldog Tunnel, which carried the former Canadian Pacific Railway (CP) southern main line under Bulldog Mountain, is in the West Kootenay region of southeastern British Columbia. By rail, the tunnel was 71.3 kilometres (44.3 mi) northeast of Grand Forks, and 39.8 kilometres (24.7 mi) west of Castlegar.

== Name origin ==
The first appearance in print of the Bulldog Tunnel name was 1899, and of the mountain, from which it derived, occurred the previous year. The post office at Brooklyn, which closed in 1900, was to have relocated to the tunnel vicinity, but no evidence suggests this happened. The location is sometimes called the Coykendahl Tunnel.

== Contract awarded ==
In May 1898, CP awarded the West Robson–Midway extension of the Columbia and Western Railway (C&W) to Daniel Mann, Foley Bros., and Peter Larson. The Bulldog Tunnel, the largest subcontract, was given to McLean Bros. This drilling and blasting bore would link the valley of Pup Creek with the Dog Creek drainage. The specified tunnel height of 6.7 metres (21 ft 10 in), and width of 4.9 metres (16 ft), required the removal of 21,408 cubic metres (28,000 cu yd) of rock. During construction, a temporary route with switchbacks carried the line over the mountain.

== Construction ==
In July 1898, McLean Bros commenced work on the longest tunnel in BC at the time. Three 80-hp steam boilers were shipped in to power the two air compressors supplying 14 drills. A full complement of employees did not arrive until October. However, a limited water supply allowed only one boiler to operate, restricting operations to four rock drills. By January 1899, only 120 metres (400 ft) of the 916 metres (3,004 ft) tunnel had been completed. By April, the rail head was nearing the eastern portal of the tunnel. In June, when a brush fire reached the gunpowder magazine, workers fled to the safety of the tunnel. The explosion damaged several buildings, twisted the railway track, and felt like an earthquake at Brooklyn, 6 kilometres (4 mi) away. That same month, McLeans abandoned the project, while the tunnel was less than a third advanced. Replaced by Olaf Olsen, progress improved. By mid-summer, tracklayers had upgraded the temporary narrow gauge Bulldog switchback track with temporary standard gauge switchbacks.

With Brooklyn largely deserted, the tunnel location provided the only viable commercial opportunities in the area. In August, a store was established. In September, two tunnellers were asphyxiated by toxic gases on entering too soon after blasting. That month, the hotel at the switchback summit closed, and mail carrier Frank Corte opened a hotel a half mile below the tunnel. Also, the Grand Forks–West Robson passenger service commenced. Immediate stations were Summit (renamed Farron) (Mile 36.8), Tunnel (West End) (Mile 44.3), Tunnel Summit (Mile 47.1), Tunnel (East End) (Mile 50.0), and Shields (Mile 60.2).

The switchbacks took an hour to negotiate. In November, a westbound passenger train derailment on the switchback caused a three-hour delay. By that time, the tunnel had progressed 390 metres (1,280 ft) from the west portal, and 370 metres (1,200 ft) from the east portal. In December, an eastbound freight train wrecked, killing a freight hopper. At month end, the approaching tunnels met. In February 1900, the first train cleared the tunnel, passing 150-metre (500 ft) below the former switchback summit. No longer needing to split the cars, the time saving for freight trains was far greater than the one hour gained by passenger trains. The next month, the Corte hotel closed.

== Operation ==
Tunnel station was 10.9 kilometres (6.8 mi) west of Coykendahl, and 7.6 kilometres (4.7 mi) east of Porcupine, and 12.2 kilometres (7.6 mi) east of Farron. The locals designated the passenger service on the southern main line as the Bulldog Express. Snowslides and rockslides were common in the tunnel vicinity.

In 1900, a brakeman fell under the wheels of a freight car at Farron, resulting in the later hospital amputation of his leg. In 1902, the 30-metre (100 ft) high Porcupine bridge burned down. During the 10-day rebuild, passenger trains terminated at either end, and passengers transferred. In 1909, a passenger train stalled in the tunnel. In 1918, a snowslide near Coykendahl derailed a train.

A 1931 forest fire destroyed the CP section house and bunkhouse. In 1935, 64 relief camp strikers, who were freight hopping westward, were arrested on a train at Coykendahl and jailed in Nelson. In 1938, a Renata trapper froze to death after leaving the train and becoming lost. Renata residents accessed the Tunnel flag stop along a 12.1-kilometre (7.5 mi) trail.

In 1952, eight cars of an eastbound freight train derailed at Coykendahl.

Passenger services on the southern mainline ended in January 1964.

Train Timetables (Regular stop or Flag stop)
Year	1904	1907	1929	1935	1943	1948	1954	1955	1961
Ref.									
Type	Regular	Flag	Flag	Flag	Flag	Flag	Flag	Flag	Flag

== Repairs & maintenance ==
In 1912, a section crew standing on a handcar was removing icicles at the tunnel mouth. An approaching train fatally injured a member who was attempting to remove the handcar from the track.

In 1918, shortly after a freight train exited the tunnel, water seepage in the roof caused about 21 metres (70 ft) to cave in at the east end. During a five-day closure, two passenger trains diverted onto the Great Northern Railway (GN) track, and travelled via Marcus, Washington. Later trains served intermediate points in BC.

In 2016, to address tunnel roof instability caused by rotting heavy timbers, shotcrete was applied, and rock bolts and overhead rock mesh installed.

== Abandoned & repurposed ==
In 1991, the CP track was abandoned westward in its entirety, and eastward almost to Castlegar. The section from Castlegar to Grand Forks is now a rail trail that includes vehicular access. The tunnel interior is pitch black, especially noticeable when travelling westward, because of a curve at the western end.

== See also ==
- "Railway Tunnels in Canada > 500 m". www.lotsberg.net.
- "Columbia & Western Rail Trail map". www.anoutsidechance.com. 14 November 2016.
