= Beavermouth (railway point), British Columbia =

Beavermouth, British Columbia
- Railway point
- Location of Beavermouth in British Columbia
- Coordinates: 51°31′00″N 117°25′0″W
- Country: Canada
- Province: British Columbia
- Land district: Cariboo
- Regional District: Columbia-Shuswap
- Elevation: 771 m (2,530 ft)
- Area codes: 250, 778, 236, & 672

Beavermouth is about 43 kilometres (27 mi) west of Golden, and about 32 kilometres (20 mi) east of the mid-point of the Connaught Tunnel beneath Rogers Pass, in southeastern British Columbia. At the mouth of the Beaver River, the train station was called Beavermouth, but the adjacent community, which no longer exists, was known as Beaver or Beaver Mouth. Nowadays, the closest road access is to the nearby Kinbasket Lake Resort.

== Railway ==
In November 1884, the Canadian Pacific Railway (CP) railhead's westward advance reached Beavermouth. Inspector Sam Steele, Sergeant Fury, and about six or seven constables of the North-West Mounted Police maintained law and order within the camps. At Beavermouth, the police post was on the opposite side of the Beaver River to the construction camp, being connected by a bridge. The police facilities included cells for 30 prisoners, a courtroom, staff dining hall, and quarters for the men. In contrast, the worker quarters contained two long double tiers of bunks for 100 men, separated by a narrow passage. Water dripping from the snow-covered roof soaked the men's blankets. Unpaid wages were accumulating, because subcontractors had not been paid by CP, which was experiencing a chronic cashflow problem. In March 1885, hundreds of men from the various camps marched on Beavermouth. An attempt was made to arrest a man inciting workers to resist the police. Steele, sick with typhoid, went outside with a police magistrate, who read the Riot Act. After Steele threatened to shoot anyone who advanced on the police post, the gathering dispersed and the strike leaders were later fined.

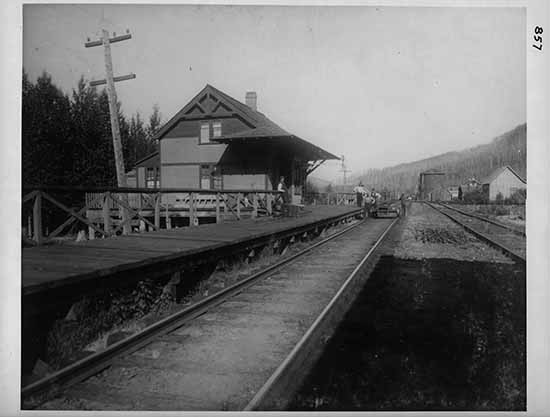
Section crew, Beavermouth Station, 1899.

The railway line hugged the southwestern bank of the Columbia River, before making a 90-degree turn onto the southeastern bank of the Beaver. Beavermouth was the Rogers Pass, then Connaught Tunnel, eastern slope base for pusher locomotives, which predominantly assisted westbound freight trains. A wye and water tank existed. A dispatcher staffed the telegraph office. The track crossed the Beaver River 2.4 kilometres (1.5 mi) west of Beavermouth.

In 1885, Thomas Thompkins built an engine house. In 1917, a four-stall engine house replaced the previous two-stall one. That year, an oil storage tank was built for oil-fired locomotives operating in the mountains. By 1919, CP had its own boarding house. In 1921, CP installed a mechanized system for filling the coal hopper.

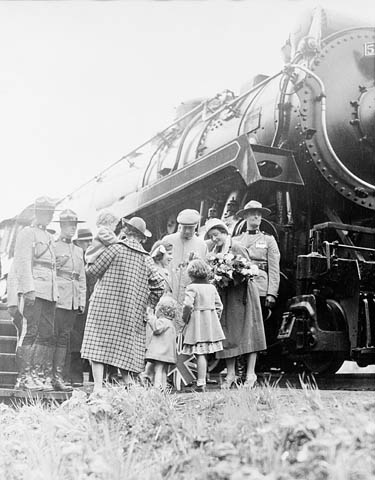
King George VI and Queen Elizabeth, Beavermouth, 1939.

In 1939, King George VI and Queen Elizabeth rode in the lead locomotive cab of the westbound royal train from Beavermouth to Stoney Creek. The following year, Madeleine Carroll rode in the cab of an eastbound passenger train from Beavermouth to Leanchoil, a choice that excludes the more spectacular scenery.

Still operational in 1948, it is unclear when the telegraph office closed. In 1950, one wing and one rotary snowplow were stationed here, but in 1955, fire destroyed the engine house.

In 1974, the catchment lake for the Mica Dam raised the water level about 24 metres (80 ft), submerging Beavermouth. For the track diversion to a higher elevation between Rogers and Redgrave, CP constructed four new bridges and a 336-metre (1,102 ft) tunnel, and adopted concrete ties for the first time. Canadian National Railway had previously used this technique. At that time, the pusher base relocated to Rogers.

The new Beavermouth is a 3,040-metre (9,980 ft) siding at Mile 62.0, Mountain Subdivision. Adjacent to the west is Rogers (Mile 66.2), and east is Redgrave (Mile 57.3). The most northerly point on the CP main line remains immediately west. When the lake level is low, it is possible to walk across the silt to the former location.

Timetables (Regular stop or Flag stop)
| Year | 1891 | 1898 | 1905 | 1909 | 1912 | 1916 | 1929 | 1935 | 1943 | 1948 | 1954 | 1955 | 1960 | 1964 |
|---|---|---|---|---|---|---|---|---|---|---|---|---|---|---|
| Ref. | | | | | | | | | | | | | | |
| Type | Regular | Regular | Regular | Regular | Reg/Flag | Flag | Reg/Flag | Reg/Flag | Regular | Regular | Regular | Reg/Flag | Flag | Flag |

== Lumber ==
During the 1888–89 winter, the Columbia River Lumber Company (CRL) logged two million feet of lumber at Blaeberry. In the spring, the logs whisked down an 800-metre (875 yd) chute into the Columbia, and floated to the company log boom at Beavermouth, where CRL had recently erected two large sawmills. Three water wheels powered one mill, and steam the other one. By 1890, the company had a warehouse, blacksmith shop, some dwellings, and two boarding houses. A total of 125–150 men worked at the mills and logging camps.

In 1897, CRL moved the steam sawmill to Moberly for winter operations. By 1903, CRL had grown into the largest lumber group in the North Kootenays with mills at Golden, Beavermouth and Kault. That year, the planing mill building was extended. The Beavermouth milling operations closed in the 1910s.

== Community ==
William G. Neilson, CRL company secretary, was the inaugural postmaster 1890–1899. However, James M. Carrall managed the CRL general store and post office. He also operated a hotel and small farm. By 1892, the community comprised two general stores, one hotel, a Presbyterian church, and a population of about 125. It provided a base for mining operations on creeks in the area.

By 1899, the hotel, church, and second store were gone. Miss Catherine E. McDonald was the inaugural teacher at the school opening that year, and CRL employee Fred Stalker became postmaster 1899–1902. By 1901, the population was about 250. After a few postmasters serving less than two years, Albert H. Wilkinson remained 1906–1920. Possibly, he ran the company general store, and assumed the enterprise after the mill closed.

Entrepreneur, Curtis D. Morris of Glacier, stepped in to fill the need by opening a store in 1921. Although he was the official postmaster 1921–1926, Mrs T. Parker, then Edward N. Forbes, were the storekeepers. The latter was postmaster 1926–1928. Assumedly, Percy G. Landsburg acquired the business, and was postmaster 1928–1945.

After being closed 1905–1929, school reopened. The population of the settlement was 35 in 1931, 62 in 1934, 73 in 1940, 64 in 1941, 57 in 1943, and 45 in 1945. The school closed in 1943, unable to attract a teacher. Dorothy took over from her husband, being postmaster 1945–1953, with the post office closing the following year.

After the 1962 opening of the Rogers Pass highway, a gravel road was built to Beavermouth, where a B.A. gas bar opened in front of the store. The cemeteries at Donald and Golden were used for burials. However, one or two graves did exist behind a picket fence at the submerged location. In 1974, the remaining CP residents moved to Rogers.

School Enrolment
| Year | Pupils | Grade | Ref. | Year | Pupils | Grade | Ref. | Year | Pupils | Grade | Ref. |
|---|---|---|---|---|---|---|---|---|---|---|---|
| 1899–1900 | 20 | | | 1929–1930 | Operated | | | 1936–1937 | 10 | 1–4 | |
| 1900–1901 | 17 | | | 1930–1931 | Unknown | | | 1937–1938 | 11 | 1–6 | |
| 1901–1902 | 18 | | | 1931–1932 | Unknown | | | 1938–1939 | 13 | 1–7 | |
| 1902–1903 | 23 | | | 1932–1933 | Operated | | | 1939–1940 | 14 | 1–8 | |
| 1903–1904 | 17 | | | 1933–1934 | Unknown | | | 1940–1941 | 10 | 1–8 | |
| 1904–1905 | 17 | | | 1934–1935 | Unknown | | | 1941–1942 | 9 | 1–8 | |
| Closed 1905–1929 | | | | 1935–1936 | 9 | 1–4 | | 1942–1943 | 9 | 1–8 | |

== Accidents ==
1886: Trees falling onto the track during a forest fire derailed the tender and baggage car of an eastbound passenger train. Fire spread from the baggage car to a sleeping car and coach. Meanwhile, the forest fire consumed the section foreman's house and telegraph office.

1900: About 5 kilometres (3 mi) to the east, a westbound freight locomotive overturned on smashing into a rockslide, killing the engineer. The fireman was badly bruised and two derailed freight cars destroyed.

1905: During shunting operations, a steel rail slipped from a flatcar fatally pinning a brakeman who was coupling two cars.

1907: When a freight train collided with a railway handcar carrying six section workers across the bridge, five men jumped clear, but one died from his injuries.

1909: A brakeman suffered a fatal skull fracture on falling from his train.

1922: A painter fell from the CP bridge and drowned in the river.

1926: A passenger train ploughed into a section crew, killing one and injuring two workers.

1934: An employee, who fell from a locomotive, was unable to work for months.

1946: A locomotive fatally struck a section foreman.

1950: On crashing into a big rock slide, a freight train locomotive derailed.

1958: A passing train fatally amputated the legs and left arm of a labourer.

1968: When eight cars from a freight train derailed, no crew were injured.

1976: While clearing a slide just east, a second slide completely buried one worker, but he escaped serious injury.

2015: An eastbound train on the main track (comprising 170 empty hopper cars) rammed the tail end of a westbound train (comprising 80 loaded containers on flatcars) still entering the siding track, derailing two locomotives and two cars.
