= Redgrave (railway point), British Columbia =

Redgrave, British Columbia
- Railway point
- Location of Redgrave in British Columbia
- Coordinates: 51°31′00″N 117°17′8″W
- Country: Canada
- Province: British Columbia
- Land district: Cariboo
- Regional District: Columbia-Shuswap
- Elevation: 848 m (2,782 ft)
- Area codes: 250, 778, 236, & 672

Redgrave siding is about 35 kilometres (22 mi) west of Golden, and about 40 kilometres (25 mi) east of the mid-point of the Connaught Tunnel beneath Rogers Pass, in southeastern British Columbia. Accessible by road in the summer months, the former small railway community is long gone. The highway turnoff is at the Redgrave Rest Area.

== Overview ==
Redgrave is a 2,366-metre (7,764 ft) Canadian Pacific Railway (CP) siding at Mile 57.3, Mountain Subdivision. Adjacent to the west is Beavermouth (Mile 62.0), and east is Donald (Mile 51.2). Listed as a station 1899–1910, the location was Mile 2,451.2 from Montreal. If it ever served even as a flag stop, by 1930 it was merely a settlement.

The siding allowed trains to pass on the single-track route. The name derives from a smallpox outbreak during the transcontinental construction in the 1880s. Victims displayed a red skin rash, and fatalities were buried in Donald. However, mystery surrounded a simple grave marker at the west end of the rail yard bearing the inscription "J McIvor, 1886".

== Operation ==
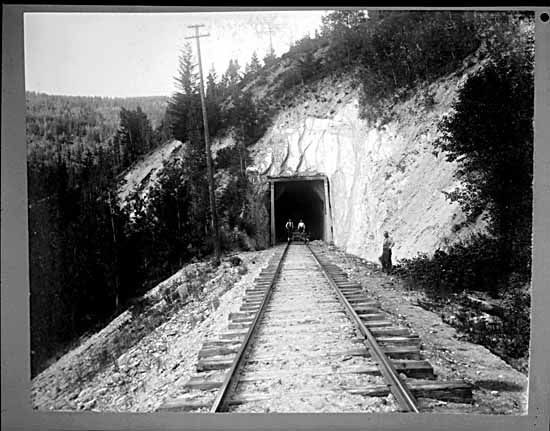
Section crew, Redgrave Tunnel, 1899.

A section crew was based at this location. In 1921, the complement comprised a foreman, two labourers and a tunnel watchman. Just west of Redgrave was the short tunnel, followed by a sharp bend in the track, forced by a turn in the river. Train engineers exercised caution owing to the extreme curvature, and a predominance of landslides in the area. Over the first 230 kilometres (140 mi), the Columbia River fell less than 12 metres (40 ft), until flowing through a gorge called Redgrave Canyon.

During early times, passenger trains would stop at points of interest like this one for passengers to alight and view the natural wonder. The catchment lake for the Mica Dam submerged this feature in the early 1970s, and required a track diversion, which replaced the sharp track bend known as "Calamity Curve", and added a further tunnel at a higher elevation. The water level now peaks a few feet lower than Redgrave. A decade later, further realignment reduced track curvature with another diversion, added 910 metres (2,970 ft) of new track, extended the siding, and removed about 300 metres (1,000 ft) of the earliest tunnel. Previously, trains had to reduce from 56 kilometres per hour (35 mph) to 40 kilometres per hour (25 mph) on entering that tunnel.

A hot box detector operates at Mile 54.5.

== Accidents ==
1913: A locomotive fatally struck an employee near Redgrave.

1931: An employee was killed while clearing a slide in the vicinity.

2009: Passing on the siding track, a westbound train, comprising grain hopper cars, rammed the tail end of an eastbound multilevel auto carrier train stopped on the main track, derailing two locomotives and six cars.

2017: Ten cars from a potash train derailed near Redgrave.
