= Vital Creek =

Stream in British Columbia, Canada

Coordinates: 55°42′47″N 125°28′04″W

Vital Creek is a creek located in the Omineca Country region of British Columbia, flowing eastward from its source in the Vital Range to meet Silver Creek, joining that creek from the west about 5 miles from its mouth into the Omineca River, about 41 km northeast of Takla Landing.

== History ==
The gold deposits of Vital Creek were discovered in 1869 by Vital Laforce, who had also been among the four discoverers of gold along Williams Creek, which was the foundation of Barkerville. This was the first creek mined in the Omineca. Late in the mining season of 1870, $7,000 was taken out by a party of 15 Chinese miners, giving some hope that significant gold might yet be found in the region.

The creek has been mined for gold and silver, which occurred simultaneously and were unusual to find in that way. It has been hydraulicked and mined by Chinese syndicates like Gow Sing and Co. The bulk of the gold was obtained on bedrock and in crevices and cracks.

Initial exploration and mining work was carried out by means of drift diggings, followed by ground sluicing and hydraulicking later. Drift mining and hydraulicking were both abandoned in the 1930s as there were no dumping facilities for mining waste. Later exploration to bedrock in pursuit of hard-rock ores met with little success.

Total gold production from Vital Creek between 1876 and 1900 was 117,091 grams, and between 1926 and 1940 another 143,122 grams of gold were taken from the creek. Early takings were from the creek's present channel downstream from a waterfall 3 km upstream from the mouth of the creek. Gold was later found upstream from the waterfall in a pre-glacial channel, in the form of coarse well-worn flakes on the bedrock.

Three jade boulders weighing 2267, 907 and 363 kilograms were reported as having been taken from the creek in 1963.

== Geology ==
The area drained by the creek is underlain by a north-northwest striking, east-dipping metasedimentary/volcanic formation of the Carboniferous to Jurassic Cache Creek Complex. Phyllite, limestone and tuff are common. White quartz veins up to a metre in width were found within these rocks.

Arquerite, a native amalgam of silver and mercury, is relatively abundant in the gold-bearing gravels of the creek.
