= Similkameen =

Similkameen may refer to:

- Similkameen, a former community in British Columbia, Canada
- Similkameen City, British Columbia, a former community in British Columbia, Canada
- Similkameen Country or Similkameen District, or "the Similkameen", a historical georegion in British Columbia, Canada
- Similkameen River, a river that runs through southern British Columbia, discharging into the Okanogan River near Oroville, Washington, United States
- Similkameen people, or Similkameens, a branch of the Salishan-speaking Okanagan people
  - Lower Similkameen Indian Band, a First Nations government
  - Upper Similkameen Indian Band
- Similkameen (electoral district), a defunct provincial electoral district in British Columbia, Canada
- Boundary-Similkameen, a defunct provincial electoral district in British Columbia
- Regional District of Okanagan-Similkameen, a regional district in British Columbia
- Okanagan—Similkameen, a defunct federal electoral district in British Columbia
- Okanagan—Similkameen—Merritt, a defunct Canadian federal electoral district in British Columbia
