= Kerr Creek =

- Location of Kerr Creek in British Columbia
- Coordinates: 49°03′00″N 118°45′00″W
- Country: Canada
- Province: British Columbia
- First settled: 1893

Kerr Creek is a ghost town located in the Similkameen Division Yale Land region of British Columbia. The town is situated near northeast of Midway, west of Grand Forks. It was founded in 1893 by Robert D. Kerr.

== See also ==
- List of ghost towns in British Columbia
