= Howellton, British Columbia =

Ghost town in British Columbia, Canada

Howellton is a ghost town located in the Omineca Country region of British Columbia, Canada. The town is situated near Manson Creek and Dunkeld.
