= Fisherman, British Columbia =

Fisherman
- Location of Fisherman in British Columbia
- Coordinates: 49°06′00″N 118°29′00″W
- Country: Canada
- Province: British Columbia

Fisherman is a ghost town located in the Boundary Country region of British Columbia. The town is situated On C.P.R., North of Grand Forks, British Columbia. Fisherman was a named railway point.

== See also ==
- List of ghost towns in British Columbia
