= Paulson, British Columbia =

Paulson
- Location of Paulson in British Columbia
- Coordinates: 49°11′59″N 118°07′04″W
- Country: Canada
- Province: British Columbia
- Region: Boundary Country
- Regional district: Kootenay Boundary
- Area codes: 250, 778, 236, & 672

Paulson is a ghost town in the Boundary Country region of south central British Columbia. The locality, on the Paulson Detour Rd off Highway 3, is about 26 kilometres (16 mi) northeast of Christina Lake and 54 kilometres (34 mi) west of Castlegar.

Bonanza Siding on the Columbia and Western Railway was named after the Bonanza mine. This siding became a flag stop on the former Canadian Pacific Railway (CP) line in 1902. That year, brothers Thomas Henry, John William, and George Alfred Paulson, applied for a liquor licence for their new hotel, which housed a general store/post office. In 1904, the post office was renamed Paulson, and George died of injuries sustained when struck by a freight train on the Red Mountain railway. The population was likely larger when a sawmill operated around 1910, but more representative would be 25 in 1918, and 23 in 1944, of which half were CP employees, and a quarter involved in mining.

Train Timetables (Regular stop or Flag stop)
	Mile	1905	1909	1912	1916	1919	1929	1932	1935	1939	1943	1948	1954	1961	1963
Farron	58.0	Flag	Reg	Reg	Reg	Reg	Reg	Reg	Reg	Reg	Reg	Reg	Reg	Flag	Flag
Paulson	62.4		Flag	Flag	Flag	Flag	Flag	Flag	Flag	Flag	Flag	Flag	Flag	Flag	Flag
Coryell	66.4	Flag	Flag	Flag	Flag	Flag	Flag	Flag	Flag	Flag	Flag	Flag	Flag	Flag	Flag

The Paulson bridge allowed the highway to bypass the settlement. The construction substructure was awarded to D.J. Manning Construction ($178,378) and the superstructure to Dominion Bridge ($726,872). The opening was in 1962. In 2019, the crossing underwent a $6-million rehabilitation.

== See also ==
- List of ghost towns in British Columbia
