= Iron Bay =

- Location of Iron Bay in British Columbia
- Coordinates: 49°26′55″N 122°51′32″W
- Country: Canada
- Province: British Columbia

Iron Bay is a ghost town located in the Lower Mainland region of British Columbia. The town is situated on the north end of Indian Arm about one kilometre from Granite Falls. Quarrying, logging and tourism was performed over the years in the area. The site is now a yacht club outstation and wharf.

== See also ==
- List of ghost towns in British Columbia
