= Edison Motors =

Canadian electric vehicle manufacturer

Edison Motors Ltd.
- Type: Private
- Industry: Truck manufacturing
- Founded: 2021; 5 years ago
- Founders: Chace Barber; Eric Little
- Headquarters: Donald, British Columbia, Canada
- Brands: Edison Blue
- Revenue: 1,514,958 Canadian dollar (2025)
- Operating income: 1.4 million CAD (2025)
- Net income: -1.6 million CAD (2025)
- Total assets: 11.3 million CAD (2025)
- Number of employees: 32
- Website: edisonmotors.ca

Edison Motors is a Canadian electric truck manufacturing startup company based in British Columbia, specializing in plug-in diesel–electric series hybrid technology for semi-truck prime-mover tractor units, full-size solid axle drive trucks, and heavy solid-axle pickup trucks, combining a generator with electric drive motors and batteries. The company was founded in October 2021 by Eric Little and Chace Barber and is a spin-off of SEI Logistics, a solar energy innovations company.

Founded with the idea to use train locomotive diesel-electric technology on forestry logging trucks, where climbing mountains empty and coming down fully loaded would make for net-zero energy use, with downhill regenerative recharging the battery power used to climb, and electric torque would obviate need for a giant diesel engine. Diesel generators and large fuel tanks would make range anxiety a non-issue.

== History ==
In 2016, University friends Barber and Little decided to start a trucking company after graduating and purchased "Old Blue", a 1969 Kenworth. Following mild success delivering and installing energy systems for remote locations utilizing generators, solar and batteries, the company refocused on providing these energy systems. Rebranding itself SEI logistics, the company developed its first product, the skid solar array. SEI next developed solar-powered light towers.

In November 2017, following the Tesla Semi announcement, SEI placed one of the first reservations in Canada.

In 2021, following continued delays from Tesla and the interactions of Barber on social media, the Tesla semi reservation was canceled and was replaced with plans to build their own electric truck. Edison Motors became a registered company on October 5, 2021 and operated out of Barbers's parents backyard in Merritt.

In September 2022 the proof of concept retrofit, Carl, was revealed during Hope Brigade Days.

Late 2023 to early 2024, following an inability to secure property for a factory in Merritt, plans were announced to move operations into a former Hayes truck factory in Terrace. However, these plans were canceled after being unable to secure proper zoning.

May 2024, Edison held an electric go-kart build challenge and competition for secondary school students, called "Edison Motors High School EV Challenge", with plans for it to become an annual event.

April 2024, concerns from Edison led to an Auditor General investigation into potential conflict of interest with the CleanBC grant program and its administrator, MNP LLP, who also offers grant consulting.

December 2024, announced that a new property in the unincorporated community of Donald near Golden, British Columbia, was being acquired with plans to build a manufacturing shop and 2 km test track. The purchase was confirmed in January 2025.

In February 2025, Edison announced their custom brand color, , Edison Blue, hex code: #042069.

Edison made public in August 2025 that regulations by Environment and Climate Change Canada (ECCC) require generators be 'on-highway' certified. Currently generators are only certified to the near identical but ineligible 'off-highway' standard, creating a default ban on diesel-electric generators for hybrid truck production.

In September 2025 the first two production trucks were showcased at the Vancouver Everything Electric show.

May 2026, ECCC granted Edison approved to build hybrid trucks with a Cummins X15.

== Prototypes ==
=== Carl ===
A blue 1962 Kenworth LW 924 "needle-nose" truck unit, named "Carl" by the Edison Motors team, was converted to diesel-electric.

They used a 3306 Caterpillar Inc. diesel generator, a drive unit removed from a Tesla Model S and some Tesla Model S batteries.

It was the first semi-truck in the world to run on a diesel–electric powertrain, similar to that found on many freight train locomotives.

Finished in September 2022, it is the initial proof-of-concept engineering prototype.

=== Topsy ===
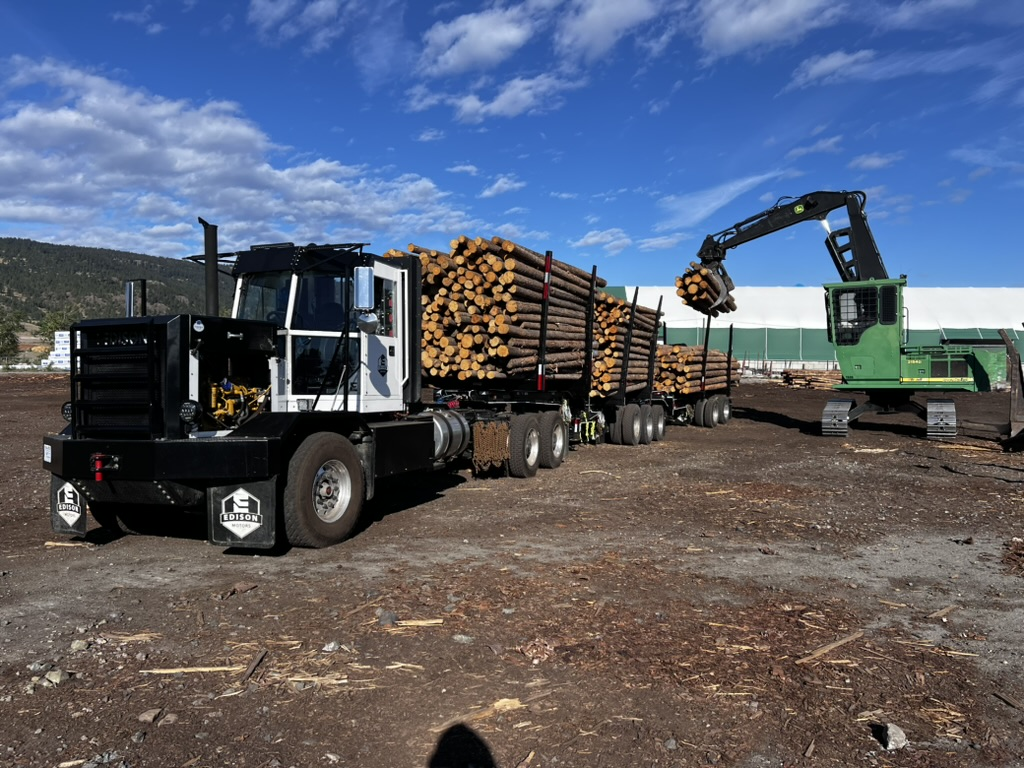
Topsy being loaded with 65,000kg of logs

Named after the circus elephant, "Topsy" is a custom-built, from the frame-on-up concept production working prototype. It demonstrates the anticipated truck design, with prototype production drive train, and all up off-the-shelf components, with prototype frame rails.

The most notable changes were the switch to "E-axles", which have the electric motor directly attached to the axle assembly, removing the need for a drive shaft. The space that was freed up by the removal of the drive shaft was utilized to mount the battery packs in between the frame rails, mitigating the risk of battery damage due to side impacts and also allowing for bigger diesel tanks for the range extender generator.

The build was finished in September 2023.

"Topsy" received its licence plate after testing & inspections in April 2024, making Edison Motors the first new OEM manufacturer of semi-trucks in British Columbia in 30 years.

=== Pickup kit ===
There are five pickup truck conversion prototypes currently in development — an International, Ford, Toyota and two Dodge Rams.

Edison partnered with Deboss Garage of Canfield, Ontario to convert a 2-wheel drive 1995 Dodge Ram 2500 to a 4-wheel drive with an Edison diesel-electric drivetrain. Other ongoing conversions are a Toyota Land Cruiser J70 with a 2.8L Cummins diesel generator by Deboss; a 2007 Ford F450 by Keabray Holdings Ltd. of Drayton Valley, Alberta; and a 2021 Dodge Ram by Bore LLC of Erie, Colorado. While Edison was to convert a 1945 International K5, it has since been switched to a 1938 International K8 for its preferential size.

== Production ==
BDE-Series

Overview
- Type: Tractor-Trailer
- Production: 2024-present
- Assembly: Donald, BC

Powertrain
- Engine: Scania 9L
- Power output: 350 kW (469 hp)
- Hybrid drivetrain: Series hybrid
- Battery: 110-330 kWh LiFePO_{4}
- Range: 2,000 km (1,243 mi)
- Electric range: 100 km (62 mi)
- Plug-in charging: CCS1 DC

Dimensions
- Curb weight: 65,000 kg (143,300 lb)

Production began in 2024 with orders from clients for various truck types. The first production wave will have five trucks built — two tri-drive oil field winch tractor trucks, a tandem highway snow plow for Emcon Services Inc., a logging tri-drive with quad wagon for Tolko, plus an undisclosed truck. The plow is projected to provide 30% fuel efficiency and have a CO_{2} reduction of 20 tons. In November 2025, Edison Motors delivered its first completed truck to a customer.
