= Emory Creek Provincial Park =

Provincial park in British Columbia, Canada

- IUCN category II (national park)
- Location within British Columbia Location within Fraser Valley Regional District
- Interactive map of Emory Creek Provincial Park
- Location: British Columbia, Canada
- Coordinates: 49°30′41″N 121°24′55″W
- Created: 1956
- Governing body: BC Parks

Emory Creek Provincial Park is a provincial park in British Columbia, Canada, located on the west side of the Fraser River just south of the town of Yale. It commemorates the location of a large boomtown, variously known as Emory, Emory Bar or Emory City, that first rose during the Fraser Canyon Gold Rush but became a major construction town during the building of the Canadian Pacific Railway in the 1880s.

Emory Creek in 1858 was a tent and shack camp, established by miners in search of gold. When it became evident that the gold was not available in the amounts estimated, the miners started moving north on the Fraser River. A few Chinese remained in the area. The area came into the hands of a man named Walker, who felt Emory Creek would become the head of riverboat navigation on the Fraser. Eventually, he sold the land to the Oppenheimer Brothers in early 1879. In the fall of 1879, Emory was chosen by the C.P.R. as the western terminus. In a short time it became Emory Creek. The town consisted of thirteen streets with its own newspaper, various shops, a brewery, nine saloons and a sawmill. When Yale was made the terminus, Emory was all but abandoned by 1885, with the completion of the railway. Today, it is an easily accessible treed campground with paved roads and flush outhouses.

== See also ==
- List of ghost towns in British Columbia
