= Takla Landing =

Coordinates: 55°29′00″N 125°58′00″W

Map

Takla Landing, also known as McLaing Landing, is an unincorporated locality and former steamboat landing on the east side of Takla Lake in the Omineca Country of the Central Interior of British Columbia, Canada. In the days of the Omineca Gold Rush, Takla Landing was a port for steamboats connecting trails from Hazelton, British Columbia via Babine Lake to trails leading from Takla Landing eastwards to the area of the gold strikes in the lower Omineca River.

The locality is the site of North Tacla Lake Indian Reserve No. 7 and adjoining it is North Tacla Lake Indian Reserve 7A. The reserves, 63.1 and 14.8 ha. respectively, are under the administration of the Takla Lake First Nation.

The community is served by the Takla Landing Water Aerodrome.

== See also ==
- List of Indian reserves in British Columbia
