= Upper Keremeos, British Columbia =

Upper Keremeos is a ghost town located in the Similkameen region of British Columbia, Canada. The town is situated on the east side of Keremeos Creek, near the village of Keremeos.
