= Omineca Gold Rush =

Gold rush in British Columbia, Canada

The Omineca Gold Rush was a gold rush in British Columbia, Canada, in the Omineca region of the Northern Interior of the province. Gold was first discovered there in 1861, but the rush did not begin until late in 1869 with the discovery at Vital Creek. There were several routes to the goldfields: two were from Fort St. James, one of which was a water route through the Stuart and Tachie Rivers to Trembleur Lake to Takla Lake and the other was overland, called the Baldy Mountain route. A third route came in overland from Hazelton on the Skeena River and a fourth route used the Fraser River and crossed over the Giscome Portage to Summit Lake, through McLeod Lake, and up the Finlay River to the Omineca River.

== 1860s ==
=== Toy's Bar ===
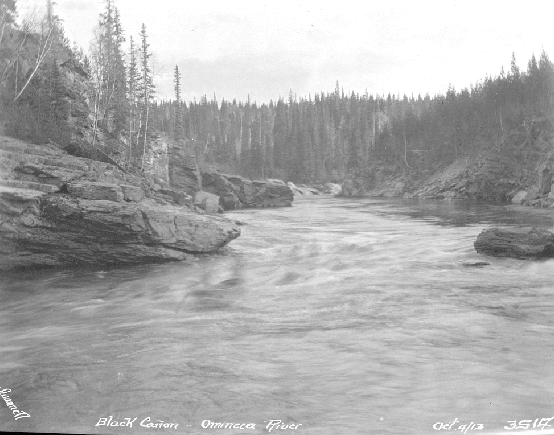
Omineca River

The first recorded gold discovery in the Omineca district was made by William Cust and Edward Carey in the summer of 1861. The two men had traveled up from Alexandria that spring and returned in the fall with 60 ounces of gold between them. Despite such a small return for a summer filled with labor and hardship, they returned the following year with a group of more than twenty prospectors. In later years, some of these men would make major gold discoveries in the region, notably, Ezra Evans and Peter Toy. Along the Finlay River they discovered gold at a bar four miles from Finlay's Forks and named it Toy's Bar after Peter Toy. The bar would yield four ounces a day for each man. Another group of men on the Parsnip River, discovered 60 ounces of gold. Reports of these successes spread and in 1863, 150 men were in the area, among them, James May and the famous "Twelve-foot" Davis who had once made a small fortune by staking out a twelve-foot section of ground between two rich claims. However, most of these newcomers were unsuccessful and, to make matters worse, supplies were scarce. Many prospectors had to leave the diggings and return to their homes in defeat. Two that stayed on and prospected at Toy's Bar were John Giscome and Henry McDame, both of whom had worked on the Peace, Smoky and Nation Rivers. McDame had made a discovery in the Cassiar district and McDame's Creek was named in his honor.

=== Silver Creek ===
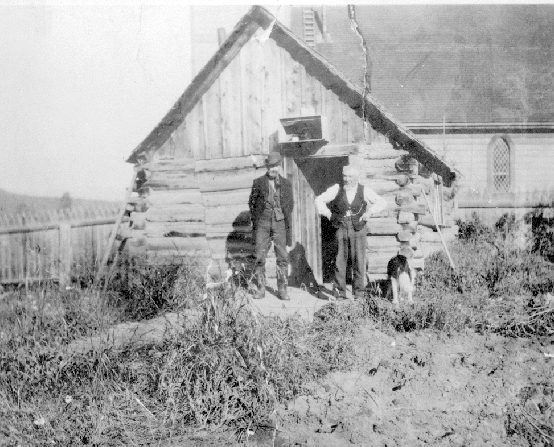
James May and Ezra Evans

Throughout 1864–1868, very little activity is recorded in the Omineca district, although many of these prospectors returned regularly and worked at Toy's Bar and other known areas where they knew they would find enough gold to be able to fund their other prospecting ventures. In 1868, four of the miners, Ezra Evans "Twelve-foot" Davis, William Humphrey and Gaylord went from Fort St. James up to Takla Landing via the Stuart, Trembleur and Takla Lakes. Along the way they discovered what they initially believed was silver but was actually arquerite, an amalgam of native silver and mercury. They named the creek where they made this discovery Silver Creek. The four miners went back to Quesnel that fall and appealed for funds to explore the Omineca area the following year. A group of miners was organized and after a concerted effort they raised more than $1000 from Quesnel farmers and businessmen and then the Colonial government gave the miners another $1000. The group of prospectors would be called the Peace River Prospecting Party. Strangely, the party was made up of only one of the original discoverers of Silver Creek, William Humphrey. The omission of Evans, Davis and Gaylord would be an error that the group's organizers would regret.

The rest of the group was Vital Laforce and Mike Byrnes, both of whom had been scouts for the Overland Telegraph Company, along with Patrick Kelly, James Hawkins and Allen Hawkins. The arrangements for the trip were made by a committee of three well-known men, storekeeper Peter Dunlevy who owned stores at Soda Creek and Fort George, Edgar Dewdney and pioneer road builder Gustavus Blin-Wright who also owned the local paddle steamers, Enterprise and Victoria.

=== Vital Creek ===
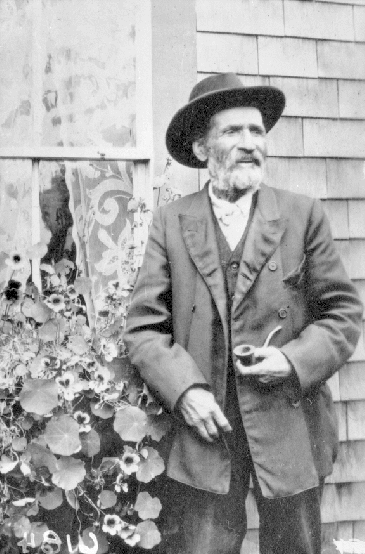
Vital LaForce 1930

The Peace River Prospecting Party set out from Quesnel on May 3, 1869, having been supplied with a large boat, the necessary tools and a year's supply of food. The party followed the water route via the Fraser, Nechako and Stuart Rivers and up through Stuart, Trembleur and Takla Lake. When they arrived at Silver Creek, Vital Laforce discovered gold on one of its tributaries on June 21. In honor of this discovery the creek was named Vital Creek and the nearby mountains were named Vital Mountains. The party received unexpected company near the end of June with the arrival of two of Silver Creek's original discoverers, Ezra Evans and Gaylord. Now the party had a problem, they had promised that they would simply explore and prospect, not actually work claims. Evans and Gaylord were not bound by any such commitment and they moved upriver from the party and commenced mining. In retaliation the party stayed at Vital Creek and mined until freeze up. One thing the two groups did agree on was that they wanted to discourage any more miners from coming up the following year. Though obliged to report their earnings, they all intended to report that the diggings were not very good and that more should be known of the country before any discoveries were reported. With the exception of Patrick Kelly and Vital LaForce, who stayed at Fort St. James, the other miners all returned to Quesnel with the news that the venture had only been marginally successful. However, suspicions were raised when the men announced they were returning to Vital Creek for the winter and even more eyebrows were raised when it was discovered that LaForce and Kelly had spent an astounding $2500 at the Fort St. James trading post.

On October 29 the Peace River Prospecting Party and Ezra Evans' group left to return to Vital Creek, but they would not be alone for long. Gold rush fever had swept Quesnel and letters had been sent to nearby Barkerville urging friends and family to drop everything and head for Omineca. Among these newcomers was Rufus Sylvester, who would not only mine in the Omineca district but would also run a letter and parcel express service between the Omineca diggings and Quesnel. Two other mining parties were organized, one under "Twelve-foot" Davis and another led by Duncan McMartin. Sylvester's party returned in December to record that they had staked 56 claims and they reported that the original miners at Vital Creek had been incorrect and the discovery was richer than everyone had been led to believe. Upon hearing this news, many more miners decided to go north to the Omineca diggings and the rush was officially on.

== 1870s ==
In January 1870, the Omineca region suffered very heavy snowfalls and extreme cold temperatures, and surface mining could not be performed. Shaft mining was attempted at various locations by Rufus Sylvester and Duncan McMartin, but both recovered insufficient gold and the shafts were abandoned.

=== Omineca Express ===
That January RJ Lamont started the Omineca Express and delivered mail from Omineca to Quesnel using a dog team. His first round trip took him six weeks: he left Quesnel on January 31, arrived at Vital Creek and returned to Quesnel on March 16 with part of his hands and face frozen. Nevertheless, he continued this service throughout the spring and summer of 1870, handling the Omineca mail for Wells Fargo and Barnard's Express. Each letter sent to or from the goldfields cost the sender a whopping $2.50.

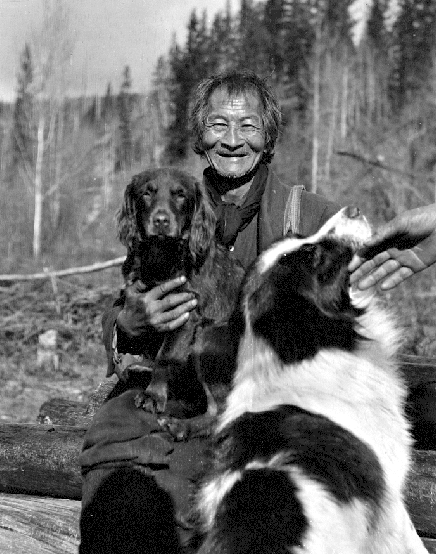
Omineca Miner Ah Hoo (1913)

Lamont noted 250 new miners coming to the district that spring, and of that number he estimated that 60% of them were white, while the remaining 40% were experienced Chinese miners from the Cariboo region.

The Quesnel Colonist reported that 350 men had passed through town on their way to the Omineca diggings.

Still others arrived on Captain William Moore's barge, which had left Quesnel at the end of April.

=== New roads ===
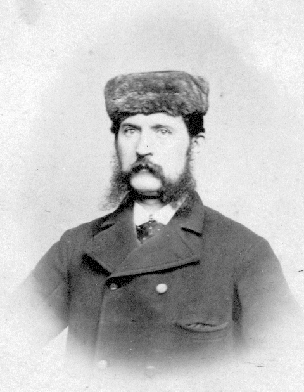
WH Fitzgerald

A road was built from Takla Landing to Fall River under the direction of the newly installed Gold Commissioner, WH Fitzgerald. Road builder Gustavus Blin-Wright proposed the construction of a road over the ten mile stretch of land at Giscome Portage, and appealed to the government for the funds to do so. Wright also suggested that a cattle trail be built from Fort McLeod. Later, in the spring of 1871, Captain William Meade would bring in a pack train from Hazelton, and he would make many improvements on that trail. Despite the fact that these roads were built and improved during the rush years, the trip was still perilous and very costly. Steamer fare on the Fraser River on the Enterprise or the Victoria was $25 and 12.5 cents a pound was added for baggage. Smaller boats near the gold fields charged $7 for the ride and 7 cents a pound for baggage. At Takla Landing, yet more money was required, as that was a road toll that charged 18 cents a pound for baggage.

=== Germansen Creek ===
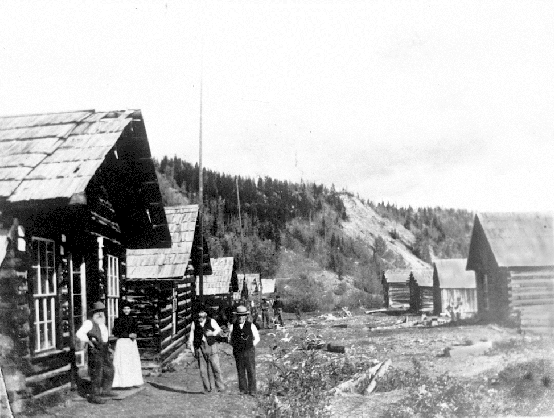
Manson Creek

By June 1870, 400 men were in the Vital Creek area. A man named Gillis had built a saloon to serve the population and "Twelve-foot" Davis built a bakery and a coffee house. Despite these new amenities, many of the miners were disillusioned by the lack of new discoveries and left the area. The price of supplies dropped dramatically, which had a negative effect, as pack trains and boats no longer wanted to bring supplies into the area if they were going to make little or no profit on the venture.

The miners who stayed at Vital Creek soon heard of a new strike made by Pete Toy off the Omineca River. One of the parties who decided to go to those new diggings was led by an American by the name of James Germansen. While he and his group were going to the new diggings, Germansen found an undiscovered creek coming off the Omineca River. To Germansen, this unknown creek, "seemed right", but his party was eager to get to Pete Toy's strike, so Germansen had to continue along with them. However, when they arrived at Pete Toy's strike they encountered little success and returned to Vital Creek. But Germansen had not forgotten the little unnamed creek and he returned there with Duncan McMartin, James May and "Blackjack" Smith.

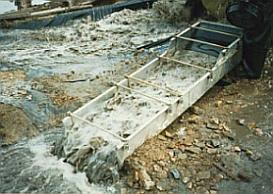
Sluice Box

Germansen's instincts had been on the money. Each man in the party could easily pan half an ounce to two ounces a day from Germansen Creek. The four men returned to Vital Creek in September with the good news and the migration from Vital Creek to Germansen Creek began. Rufus Sylvester constructed sluice boxes and his group's yield was often ten ounces of gold per day for each man. 4400 ounces of gold were reported in 1870, but the real total may have been much higher as many of the miners were reluctant to reveal the true amount of gold taken from their claims.

=== Manson Creek ===
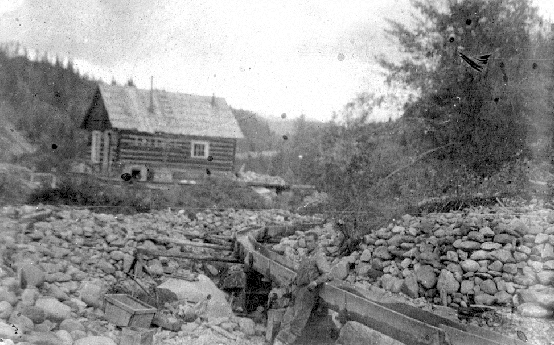
Mining Recorder's Cabin at Manson Creek

During the winter of 1870–71, Rufus Sylvester carried mails and gold between the Omineca district and Quesnel using a dog team. During this period a new settlement had been built at Germansen. Initially it was simply called Germansen, but it would later be called Omineca City. Another gold rush entrepreneur arrived in the area, Peter Cargotitch, and built a saloon at Omineca City and hired a group of entertainers called the McGinley Troupe to perform for his customers. At Germansen Creek, many good claims were being worked up and down both sides of the creek. One group of five men recovered 390 ounces in 13 days, while Duncan McMartin and his crew averaged 10 ounces a day and James Germansen and "Twelve-foot" Davis mined 20 to 120 ounces per week. Two sawmills were constructed, and sluice boxes were built by nearly all of the miners to aid in easier and faster gold retrieval. However, by June 1871, many of the miners at Germansen Creek were having little luck and they struck out to find new areas to prospect. On July 5, a man named Robert Howell made a discovery on Manson Creek, a small creek that was either named after Shetland Islander, William Manson. or Donald Manson of the Hudson's Bay Company.

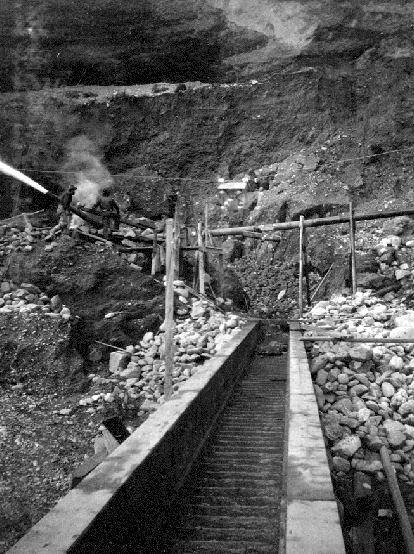
Hydraulic Mine at Manson's Creek 1901

Robert Howell panned more than 20 ounces of gold in two hours. Manson's Creek was only eight miles from Germansen Landing and when the news of Howell's strike was made, men rushed to this new site and staked their claims. Whether it was named after him or not, William Manson would do very well at Manson Creek, and would return to the Shetland Islands, becoming a prominent businessman there and employing hundreds of his countrymen in mills he built for wool processing.

=== Lost Creek and others ===
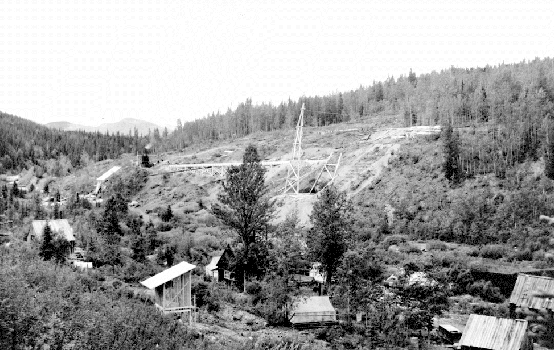
Slate Creek 1933

After the discovery at Manson's Creek in July 1871, more large strikes were made on nearby creeks. Among these were Blackjack Creek, Kildare Creek, Mosquito Creek, Slate Creek and Nugget Gulch. One of this richest creeks was found by accident by James Carson, H. Guest and J Griffith, who had gotten lost while looking for Manson's Creek and literally stumbled across it, thus they called it Lost Creek. The very first panful taken from Lost Creek yielded 3/4 of an ounce of gold. With all these new strikes in the district, new towns sprang up practically overnight: Manson's Creek, Howellton and Dunkeld. The residence of the Gold Commissioner's would be built at Dunkeld. There would be three Gold Commissioners for the Omineca district in the 1870s and they were, Peter O'Reilly, WH Fitzgerald and D. Ballentyne, who would also act as Stipendary Magistrates.

Despite the building boom, there was only one trader in the area in the summer of 1871, a man named Elmore who was stationed at Omineca City. Elmore made a small fortune selling supplies to the miners. Food prices were very high and some items, like picks and shovels were not available at any price. Because of this high cost of living and the difficulty in procuring the necessary supplies, many miners left the area. Of those who stayed it is reported that some did very well. One report claimed that 500 ounces a week was being taken from Germansen Creek alone. Again, these numbers may have been much higher, and very little was ever recorded on the Chinese miners, where they worked, or how they fared in their mining endeavours.

250 miners stayed in the region over the winter of 1871–72 and constructed cabins at Howellton. A music hall was built at Dunkeld and another town was built at Manson's Creek, Manson's Town, which featured a music hall, theatre, recreation center and a bakery.

In the spring of 1873 Gold Commissioner WH Fitzgerald died of a seizure at his cabin in Dunkeld. By then rush was mostly over, even though there were still some claims that were doing well and Lost Creek was still yielding gold at the rate of 90 to 200 ounces a week. By the fall of that year, the news of the strike in the Cassiar district had reached the Omineca and many men left for these new, "greener pastures". Among those to go to Cassiar were Vital Laforce, Rufus Sylvester, "Blackjack" Smith and Henry McDame. James Germansen remained in the Omineca, while David Humphrey died from ingesting poisonous mushrooms.

80 miners were in the district in 1874 and the total reported gold they mined was 5000 ounces. In the Cassiar, 14,000 men produced 68,750 ounces. Therefore, if those estimates are correct, the ones who remained, fared better at 62.5 ounces per man, than the ones who left and made only 49.1 ounces per man.

== After the rush ==
Placer mining continued on a small scale in the Omineca for many years and then, in the 1890s large companies from Victoria and Ottawa came to the district and began hydraulic mining which continued well into the 1900s. The amount of activity fluctuated with gold prices, mining restrictions and economic conditions.

In the 21st century, mining is still being practiced in the Omineca, although all of the old gold rush towns are long gone, with the exception of Manson Creek, which still exists today.

== Map of routes used ==
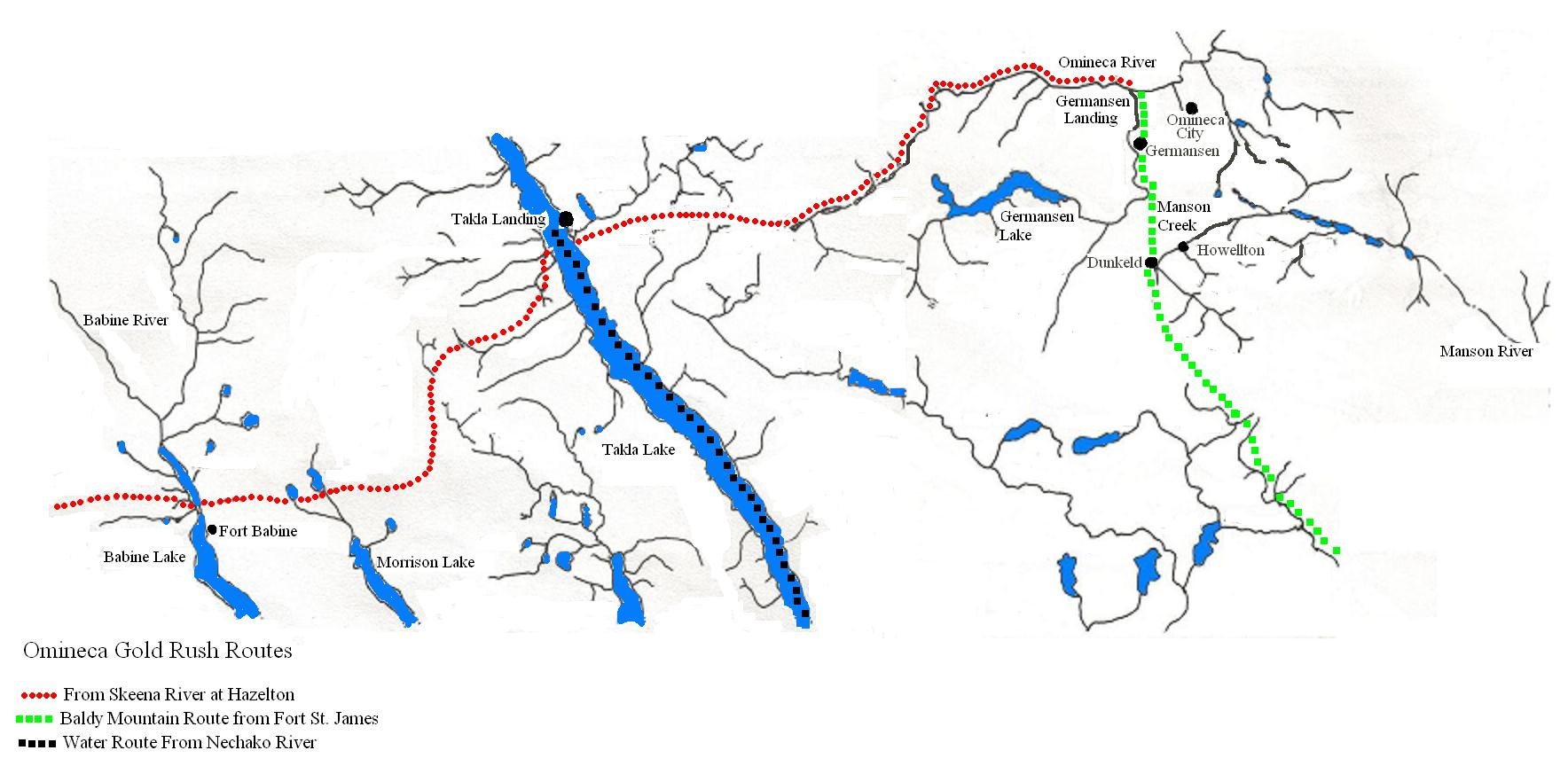

== Chart of gold reported by year ==
| Year | Ounces Reported | Value in $ | No. of miners active |
|---|---|---|---|
| 1869 | None reported |
| 1870 | 4400 |
| 1871 | 31,000 | 400,000 | 1,200 |
| 1872 | 29,000 |
| 1873 | None reported |
| 1874 | 5000 |
| 1875 | 2002 |
| 1876 | None reported |
| 1877 | None reported |
| 1878 | None reported |
| 1879 | 2250 |

== See also ==
- British Columbia Gold Rushes
- List of ghost towns in British Columbia
- Hazelton, British Columbia
