= Leadville Municipal Airport =

Former airport in Colorado, United States of America

Leadville Army Airfield
- Part of Army Air Force Training Command
- Lake County, near Leadville, Colorado
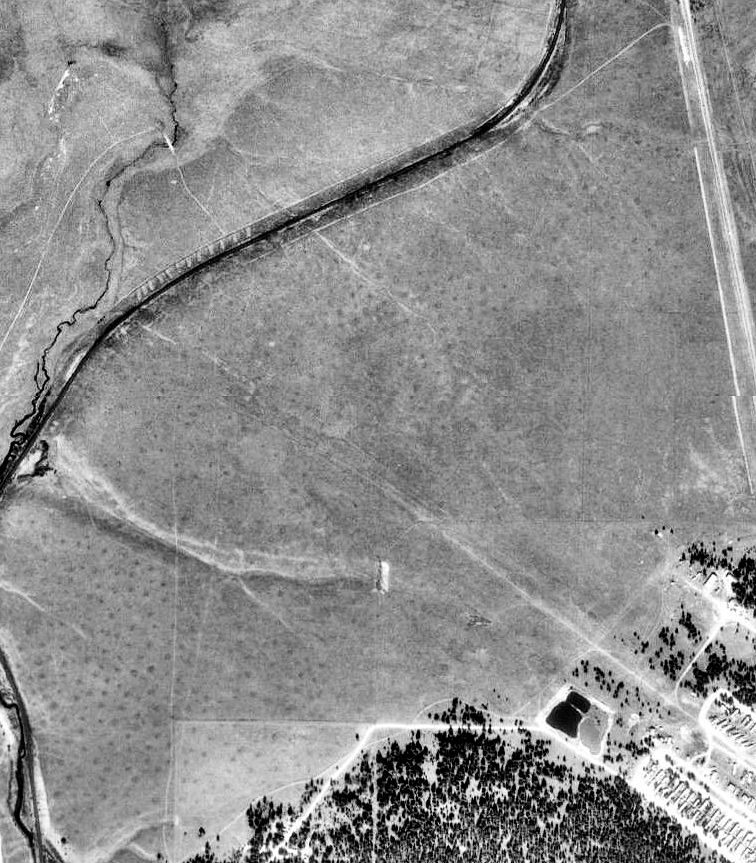
- 1999 image of mobile home park (lower right) on the southeast of the airfield built on the end of an old runway (faintly discernible).

Site information
- Type: Army Airfield
- Controlled by: United States Army Air Forces (Third & Second Air Forces)

Location
- Coordinates: 39°16′59.98″N 106°19′59.98″W

Site history
- Built: 1942
- In use: 1943-1944

Leadville Municipal Airport (Leadville Army Airfield c. Aug 1943-5) was a Colorado World War II Army Airfield "adjacent to Highway No. 24" and named for Leadville, Colorado, 2 mi (3.2 km) southeast.

== Leadville Flight Strip ==
On September 10, 1943, the existing Leadville Flight Strip of ~49 acres (20 ha) included a 300 ft × 1,450 ft (91 m × 442 m) landing strip, and the "buildings area" was ~8 acres (3.2 ha).

== Leadville Army Airfield ==
The Leadville landing field became* a United States Army Air Forces Third Air Force auxiliary field of Colorado Springs' Peterson Field which was a photo reconnaissance training facility and base of the 35th Altitude Training Unit.

== Municipal airport ==
After being used as a post-war municipal airport, the Leadville facility closed and was dismantled by 1949.
