= Teepee, British Columbia =

Teepee
- Location of Teepee in British Columbia
- Coordinates: 59°38′00″N 134°40′00″W
- Country: Canada
- Province: British Columbia

Teepee is a ghost town located in the Cassiar Land District of British Columbia. The town is situated near the junction of Teepee and Warm Creeks.
