= Leadmill (disambiguation) =

The Leadmill is a nightclub and music venue in Sheffield, South Yorkshire, England.

Leadmill may also refer to:

- Leadmill, Derbyshire, England
- Leadmill, Flintshire, Wales; a UK location

== See also ==
- Leadville
