= Manson Creek, British Columbia =

Manson Creek
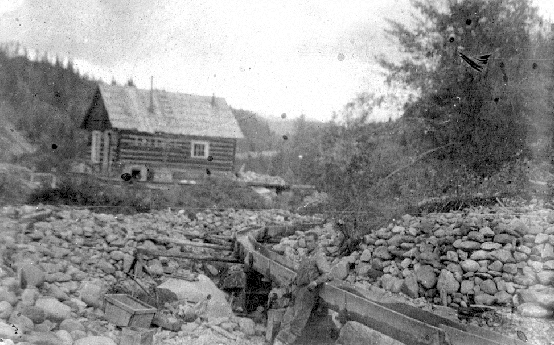
- Mining recorder's cabin at Manson Creek

- Location of Manson Creek in British Columbia
- Coordinates: 55°40′00″N 124°29′00″W
- Country: Canada
- Province: British Columbia

Manson Creek is a small village with a low population located in the Omineca region of British Columbia, Canada. The town is situated on the confluence of Manson Creek and Slate Creek, north of Manson Lakes. The community is quite isolated being 180km north of Fort St. James or 180 kilometres (110 mi) west of Mackenzie via all weather logging roads.

During the Omenica Gold Rush, Robert Howell discovered coarse placer gold in Manson Creek on July 5 1871. The communities Manson Creek, Howellton and Dunkeld were established soon after. Howelltown, built on Discovery Bar was at first the largest and became the capital of the Omineca. Dunkeld built on upper Lost Creek was the site of a small theatre. Manson Creek, at the bottom of Kildare Gulch had for a time three saloons and became the government centre with the Post Office and Gold Commissioners offices.

Of all the old communities established in the Omenica Goldfields only Manson Creek remains today. The old Gold Commissioners Office/Post Office building vintage 1871 still stands at its original site. Manson Creek has changed much over the years. During the 1930s an even greater Gold Rush revived the community as it shifted closer to the new Hudson's Bay Trading Post established in 1936.

In the 1980s Manson Creek again experienced a surge of placer and lode gold prospectors when gold prices soared to record highs. Forty to fifty crown residential lots were surveyed and sold quickly. In 1981, an elementary school was built and remained open for only two years, when it was closed due to government cutbacks. The late 1980s were hard on the community of Manson Creek. A drop in business and family squabbles led to the bankruptcy of the store. A few years later the property was donated to the newly formed Manson Creek Historic Society.
