= Brooklyn, British Columbia =

Coordinates: 49°24′02″N 118°03′12″W

Brooklyn is by the mouth of Brooklyn Creek on the west shore of Lower Arrow Lake in the West Kootenay region of southern British Columbia. The former steamboat landing, accessible only by boat, was approximately 31 kilometres (19 mi) northwest of Castlegar.

== Name origin ==
The first appearance in print of the Brooklyn settlement name was 1898. William Parker, the townsite owner, had preempted the land a few years earlier. He reputedly named it after his native Brooklyn, New York. A natural arch in the vicinity is sometimes called after the more famous Brooklyn Bridge.

== Community expansion ==
In June 1898, Brooklyn became the Daniel Mann, Foley Bros., and Peter Larson construction headquarters for the Columbia and Western Railway westward extension. Anticipating a secure future as a mining town, infrastructure included a newspaper, hospital, large wharf, meat wholesaler, laundry, brewery cold storage, several hotels, and multiple stores. That month, a wagon road was constructed for conveying equipment and supplies from the wharf up Pup Creek to the Bulldog Tunnel project and other points along the imminent railway line.

By July, 10 hotels were open, and five more were under construction. That month, a police constable arrived. By August, the Brooklyn–Robson steamboats departed four times daily. The same month, the town water supply system, the two-cell jail, and the opera house, were completed.

L.M. Livingstone was the inaugural postmaster 1898–1899. In November, the Brooklyn–Cascade City stage line was revived. The previous venture, launched in September, ended after a few trips.

== Community demise ==
In January, 1899, a hotel and adjoining building burned to the ground. That month, the railway contractors' payroll office, followed by the balance of headquarters staff, relocated to Cascade City. By this time, the remaining hospital patients had largely transferred to the Cascade hospital.

By March, Brooklyn was largely deserted, but the three times weekly boat arrivals unloaded supplies for haulage to the work camps along the line. That month is the final mention of Constable Forrester being in residence. Also, Frank Corte took over the stage line and mail delivery along the route to Cascade City, likely closing down not long after the September opening of the railway line.

From a peak of 15 hotels, closures left eight still operating in April, but only one by July. In September, a fortuitous fire destroyed the insured store and adjacent buildings. The sole store and hotel receive no mention after this date. The post office, which closed in August, possibly later reopened for several months, but the location is unclear. After less than a one-year existence, the forming bustling town was stripped of doors, windows, and anything salvageable that could be carried away.

A decade later, the vacant site was included in land subdivided for orchards, but was submerged when the Keenleyside Dam flooded the area in 1968.

== See also ==
- "1899 Kootenay map". www.library.ubc.ca. p. 1.
