= Allen Webster Hawkins =

Newspaper editor (b. 1925, d. 2016)

Allen Webster “Web” Hawkins (December 15, 1925- April 8, 2016) was newspaper editor-publisher and local community advocate. He began his career at 16 years old working as a printer’s devil at St. Francois County Journal earning $1.50 a week. Along with his wife Gladys Ann (Shmitty) Schmidt, Web purchased and published The Osawatomie Graphic (News). The couple acquired other journals including The Linn County News; Louisburg Herald; and The Emporia Times. The couple also had partial ownership in: The Hillsboro Star-Journal and The Herington Times. Hawkins presided over the National Newspaper Association and Kansas Press Association. He is enshrined in the Kansas Press Association's Newspaper Hall of Fame.

== Recognition ==
Hawkins received awards:

- The (1987) University of Missouri School of Journalism Honor Medal;
- The (1988) NNA’s Robert M. Bailey Award;
- The (1996) KPA’s Clyde M. Reed Jr. Master Editor Award.
