= Gladstone, British Columbia =

Gladstone is a ghost town in the Boundary Country region of southern British Columbia. It is 18 km (11.2 mi) east of Christina Lake.

Initially honouring William Ewart Gladstone, the name changed to Coryell in 1900. Jack Arthur Coryell was a well-known surveyor in the region. However, Coryell was still often called Gladstone. At its peak in 1898, Gladstone had 3 hotels, 3 stores, and a livery stable, among other businesses. Gladstone was built on mining and the railway. Many prospectors came to mine in the Burnt Basin locality.
