= Leadville, British Columbia =

Abandoned town in Canada

Leadville is a ghost town located in the Similkameen region of British Columbia, Canada. The town is situated between Railroad Creek and Sutter Creek. Leadville was also known as Summit City.
