= Similkameen City, British Columbia =

Ghost town in British Columbia, Canada

Similkameen City is a ghost town located in the Similkameen Country region of British Columbia, Canada. It is located along BC Highway 3 surrounding the Stemwinder Provincial Park, parallel to the Similkameen River. The lots that make up the "City" comprise District Lot 1968 of the Similkameen Division, Yale Land District; 5.4 km west of Hedley, BC. The Townsite was promoted by Mr. Frank Bailey

== Map ==
- "Mining map of part of Similkameen River, Osoyoos Mining Division, Yale District, British Columbia". library.yale.edu. 1900.
