= Platelayer =

Railway industry occupation

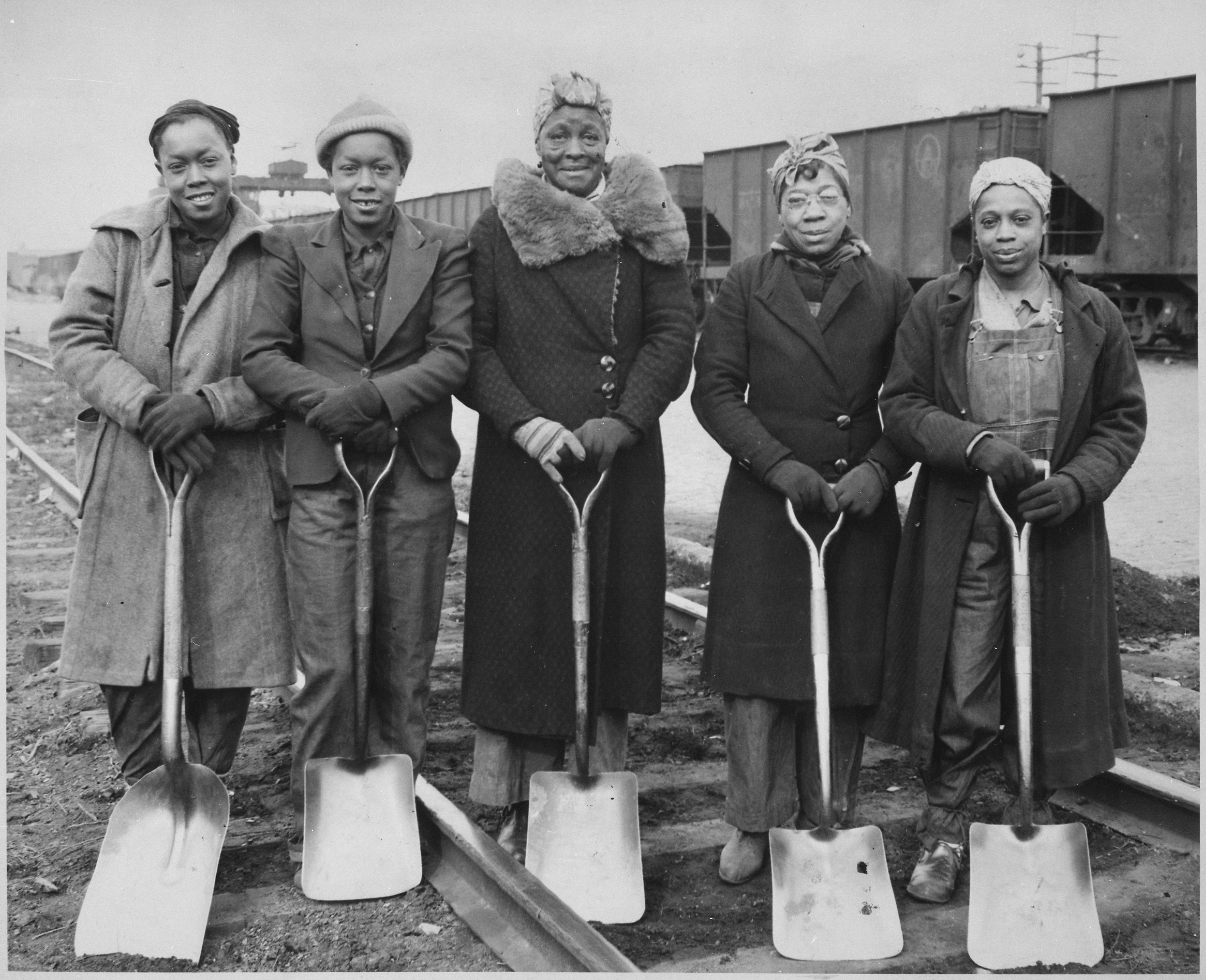
Trackwomen, 1943. Baltimore & Ohio Railroad Company

A platelayer (British English), fettler (British English – UK, Australia, NZ), or trackman (American English) is a railway employee who inspects and maintains the permanent way of a railway, usually working in teams or gangs under the charge of a foreman called (in UK, Australia and NZ) the "ganger", often assisted by an assistant ganger. The term "platelayer" derives from the plates used to build plateways, an early form of railway.

== Track inspection ==
Inspecting and maintaining the track, including all its component parts such as rails, sleepers, fishplates, bolts, etc., are the chief responsibility of the platelayer. Their duties include greasing points, and generally watching for wear and tear. When sections of track require complete replacement, larger teams of platelayers work together, and today employ a range of labour-saving machinery for many of the tasks traditionally undertaken by hand by platelayers.

== Platelayers' hut ==
=== United Kingdom ===
In British usage the term platelayers' hut refers to a lineside shelter in which a platelayer would historically be based. In the heyday of steam railway operation a platelayer might be assigned to each mile or two miles of track, with a platelayers' hut as his shelter and working base. He would regularly patrol his section of track. In modern railway operation platelayers tend to operate in mobile teams, but the lineside of the British railway network still includes a large number of abandoned and generally dilapidated platelayers' huts. Platelayers' huts were generally a single room, immediately adjacent to the running lines, equipped with a table, chairs, and a simple stove for heating.

=== Sweden ===
In Sweden, each railway employed a number of platelayers with the responsibility for the maintenance of a designated part of the line. Instead of working from huts, they lived in cottages along the line (banvaktsstugor, singular banvaktsstuga). These cottages were usually designed to match the stations in architectural design. Each cottage would typically have a couple of rooms and a kitchen, and the platelayers often kept a cow or chicken, as well as growing vegetables and fruit. The platelayer system was finally dismantled in the 1950s, but many cottages still stand, typically used for holiday purposes.

== Gallery ==
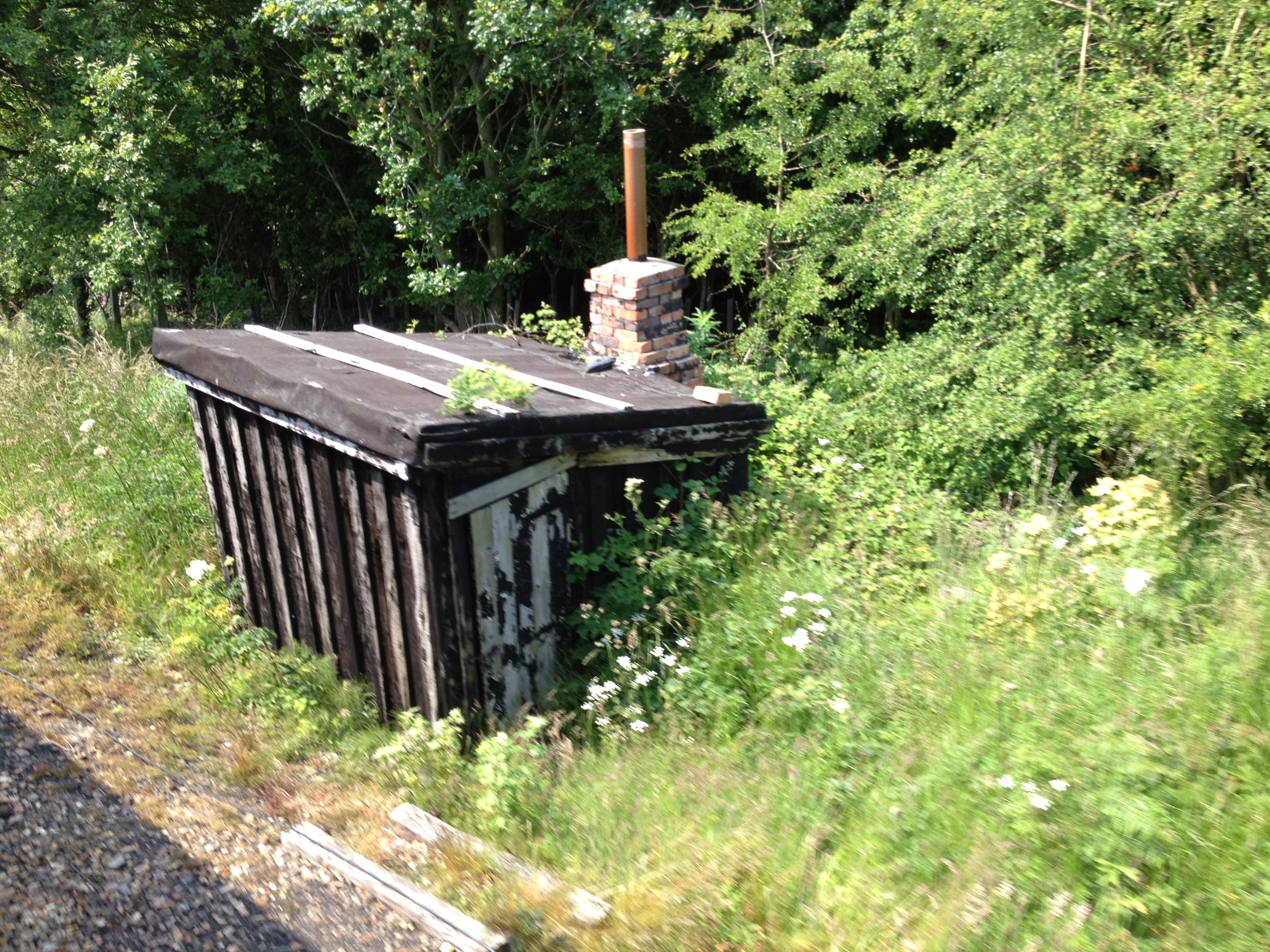
An abandoned platelayers' hut in Norfolk in England

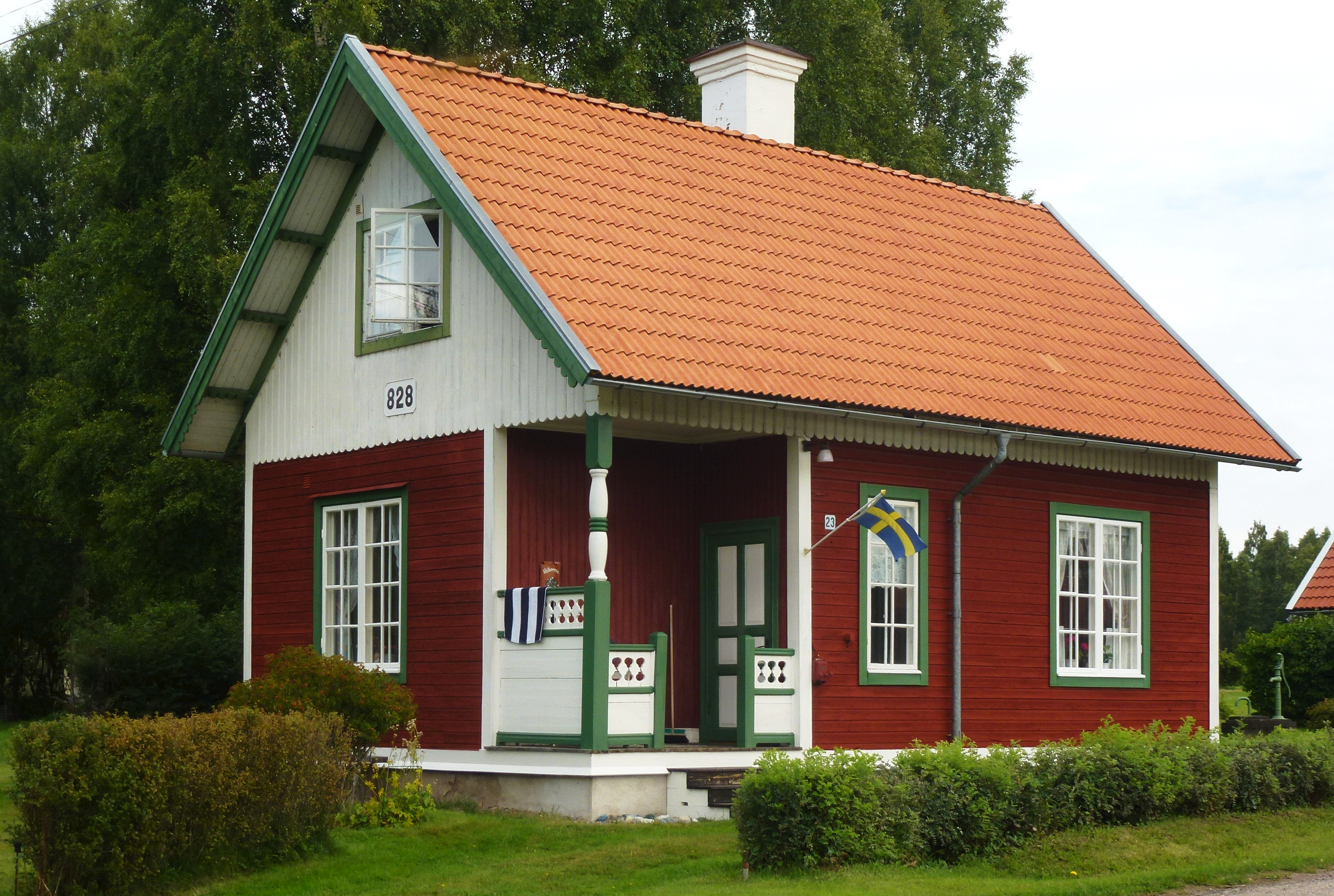
Platelayers' cottage in Grangärde in Sweden

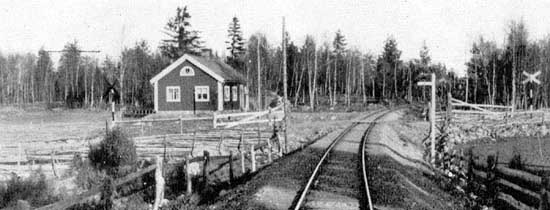
Platelayers' cottage in Bovik in Sweden (1925)
