= Nampa =

Nampa may refer to:

- Namibia Press Agency
- Nampa, Alberta, a village in Canada
- Nampa, a peak in Gurans Himal, Nepal
- Nampa (game), an eroge series by ELF
- Nampa (Huaorani) (c. 1935–1956 or 1957), a Huaorani tribesman
- Nampa, Idaho, a city in the United States
- Nanpa, a Japanese social phenomenon
- Anon Nampa, Thai human rights activist

== See also ==
- Nanpa (disambiguation)
