= Nanpa (disambiguation) =

Nanpa is a type of flirting in Japan.

Nanpa or NANPA may also refer to:

- Dōkyūsei (video game series) aka Nanpa, a dating simulation game
- North American Nature Photography Association
- North American Numbering Plan Administration, the organization responsible for assigning telephone area codes in most of North America

== See also ==
- Nampa (disambiguation)
