= Northwest Francophone Education Region No. 1 =

School district in Alberta, Canada

Location
- 4 Rue Bouchard; St. Isidore, Alberta, Canada Canada

Other information
- Website: www.csno.ab.ca

Northwest Francophone Education Region No. 1, known in French as Conseil scolaire du Nord-Ouest No. 1, is a French first language authority within the Canadian province of Alberta operated out of St. Isidore.

== Schools ==
- École des Quatre-Vents, Peace River (PK-12)
- École Héritage, Falher (PK-12)
- École Nouvelle Frontière, Grande Prairie (PK-12)

== See also ==
- List of school authorities in Alberta
