= Nampa, Alberta =

Nampa
- Village
- Village of Nampa
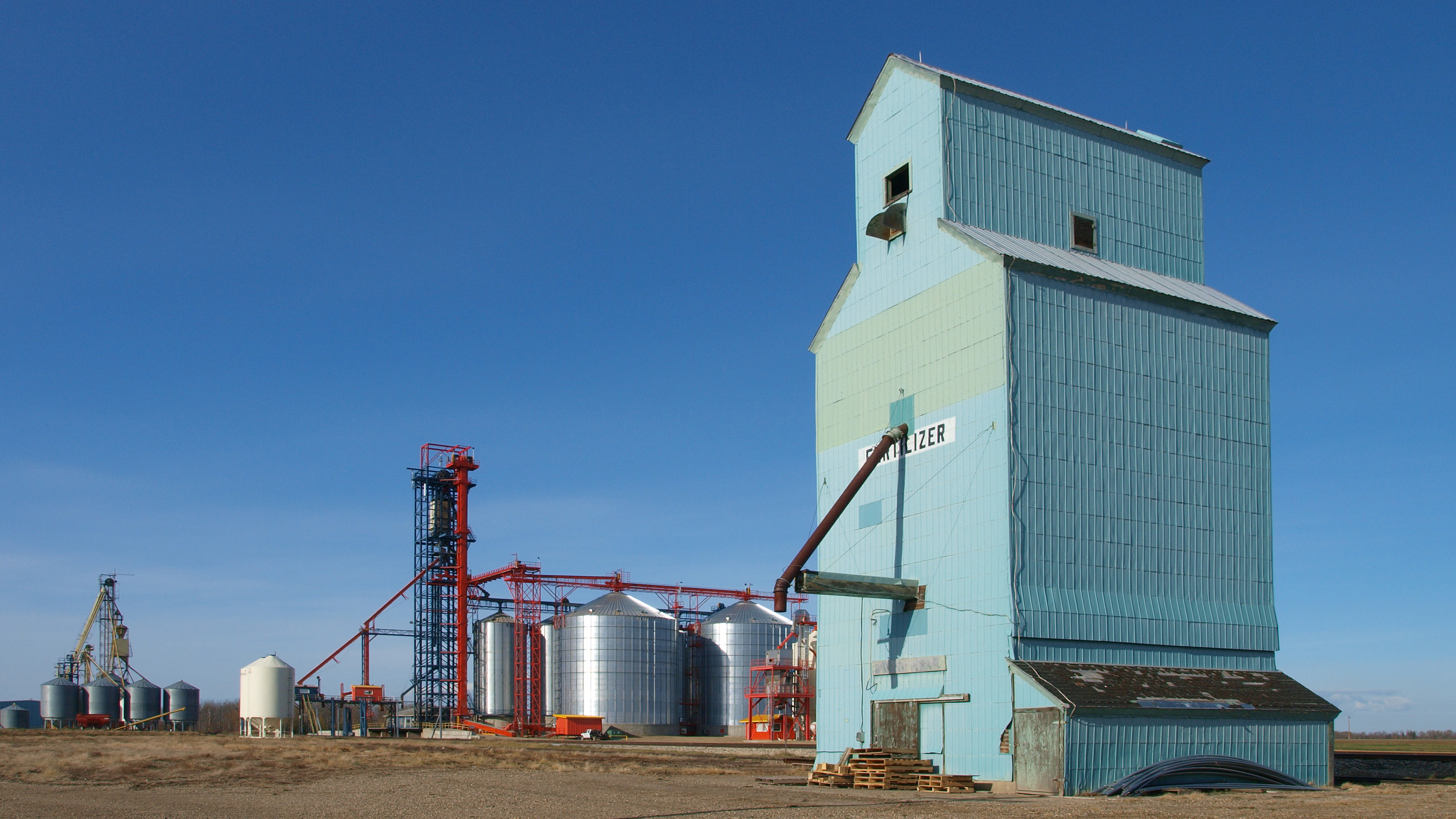
- Motto: A Place close to the Heart
- Location in Northern Sunrise County

- Location within Alberta
- Coordinates: 56°02′10″N 117°07′59″W
- Country: Canada
- Province: Alberta
- Region: Northern Alberta
- Census Division: No. 17
- Municipal district: Northern Sunrise County
- Incorporated
  - Village: January 1, 1958

Government
  - Mayor: Perry Skrlik
  - Governing body: Nampa Village Council
  - MP: Chris Warkentin
  - MLA: Frank Oberle, Jr.

Area (2021)
  - Land: 1.69 km^{2} (0.65 sq mi)
- Elevation: 570 m (1,870 ft)

Population (2021)
  - Total: 367
  - Density: 217.5/km^{2} (563/sq mi)
- Time zone: UTC−06:00 (Alberta Time)
- Highways: 2; 683
- Waterways: Heart River
- Website: Official website

Nampa is a village in northern Alberta, Canada. It is 27 km (17 mi) south of the Town of Peace River on Highway 2. Heart River crosses the Highway 2 just north of community. Canadian National Railway owned railway traverses the village. Nampa is an Indigenous word for 'the Place'.

== Demographics ==
In the 2021 Census of Population conducted by Statistics Canada, the Village of Nampa had a population of 367 living in 168 of its 189 total private dwellings, a change of 0.8% from its 2016 population of 364. With a land area of 1.69 km^{2} (0.65 sq mi), it had a population density of 217.2/km^{2} (562.4/sq mi) in 2021.

In the 2016 Census of Population conducted by Statistics Canada, the Village of Nampa recorded a population of 364 living in 156 of its 176 total private dwellings, a 0.6% change from its 2011 population of 362. With a land area of 1.71 km^{2} (0.66 sq mi), it had a population density of 212.9/km^{2} (551.3/sq mi) in 2016.

== Economy ==
The economy of Nampa is significantly dependent on agriculture and associated services. Great Northern Grain Terminals, a privately owned and operated grain company that was established in 1986 has a 77,200 MT terminal in Nampa. Peace River Timothy Processing Plant operates a timothy hay growing, harvesting, baling, dehydrating and double compression plant in the community. The plant specializes double compressed timothy hay for export to Asian markets such as Japan. Nampa Co Op Seed Processors provide seed cleaning services.

Forestry and oil and gas industries are also a part of the Village of Nampa economy. Boucher Brothers Lumber Mill near Nampa produces dimensional lumber between 1x3 to 2x10 in 16-foot (4.9 m) lengths for Alberta construction market. Lying adjacent to the Peace River Oilsands, Nampa also sees some oil and gas activity.

== Government ==
The Village of Nampa is governed by a mayor (Perry Skrlik), deputy mayor (Dale Gach) and three councillors who meet once a month. It is currently located in the Peace River Federal Electoral District, and as such is represented by Chris Warkentin; in the next federal election it will become part of the new riding of Peace River—Westlock.

== Recreation and attractions ==
The Nampa Recreation Centre is the main centre for the community and recreation activities in the community. The facility contains a curling rink, an arena, a dance hall and several conference rooms. Mill Brown Memorial Park has camping and picnic facilities in addition to having baseball diamonds, tennis courts and a creative children's playground. Other facilities include:

- Nampa Centennial Playground
- Legacy Park
- Nampa and District Pioneer Museum is open during the summer and serves a tourist information centre

Parks and recreational areas in close proximity to the community of Nampa include Wilderness Park The Heart River Golf Course is just north of the village. Green Valley Provincial Park to the northeast in the Heart River valley extends from Nampa to the Town of Peace River providing an important corridor for wildlife.

== Education ==
Nampa Public School provides education for students from Kindergarten to grade 6. Secondary school students are transported to the Town of Peace River.

== Media ==
Nampa is served bi-weekly by alternative newspaper The Vault Magazine.

== See also ==
- List of communities in Alberta
- List of francophone communities in Alberta
- List of villages in Alberta
