= Kōha =

Originally written in kanji as 硬派 (lit. "the hard school"), with the character 硬 (lit. "hard"), Kōha refers to the group or people with the features of "hard", "strong," or "tough". In the Meiji era, the opposite word to kōha was nanpa.

== Kōha (thought) ==
Kōha often refers to people with strong and radical opinions. Kōha thought in the Meiji era mainly referred to political views, meaning nationalists and even militarists who were insistent on preserving Japan's indigenous culture and promoting radical politics in order to increase Japan's foreign status.

== Kōha (Meiji student culture) ==
Kōha in Meiji student culture referred to the faction of students who were showing their "toughness" by wearing the more casual, rough, and traditionally Japanese bushi style of clothing, compared to nanpa who were dandies affecting an elegant, European-style fashion and enjoyed courting girls. Many of the Kōha students, especially those from southwest Japan, took up the nanshoku culture from the Tokugawa period and engaged in male-male sexuality since they believed that relationships with females would feminize them and make them "soft".
