= Greene Valley Provincial Park =

Provincial park in Alberta, Canada

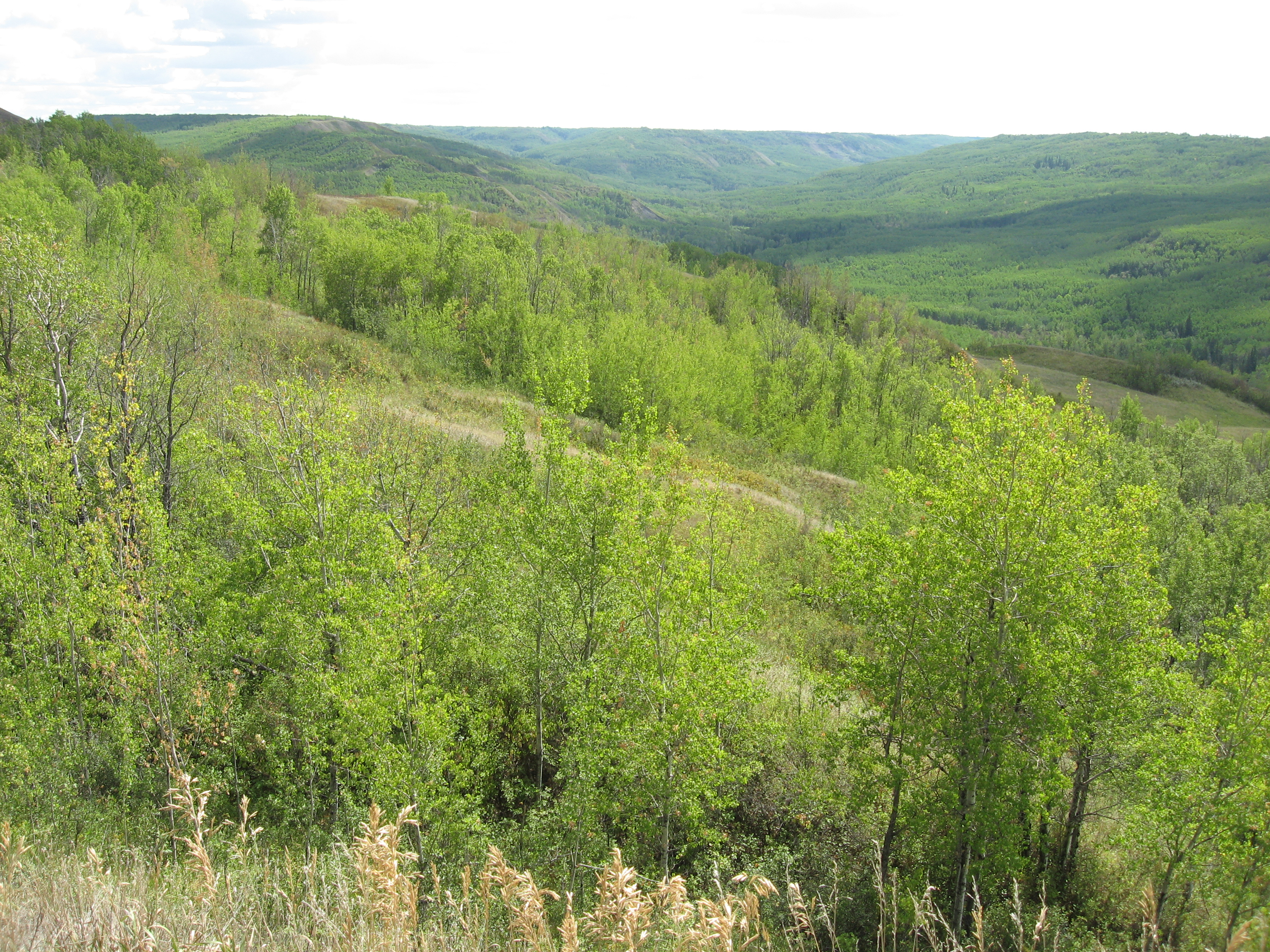
- Greene Valley Provincial Park

- Location within Alberta
- Interactive map of Greene Valley Provincial Park
- Location: Northern Sunrise County, Alberta, Canada
- Nearest city: Peace River
- Coordinates: 56°08′17″N 117°13′23″W
- Area: 31.71 km^{2} (12.24 sq mi)
- Governing body: Alberta Tourism, Parks and Recreation

Greene Valley Provincial Park is a provincial park east of the Town of Peace River, Alberta, Canada, in Northern Sunrise County. It was designated a provincial park on June 6, 2000, by the Alberta provincial government.

It is located in the Heart River valley and encompasses the confluences of the Heart River and its two downstream tributaries. The park stretches just over 26 kilometres from the Town of Peace River southwest towards the Village of Nampa. The Heart River is a major tributary to the Peace River and is a wildlife corridor. The park also provides winter range for moose and mule deer.

The Province of Alberta is currently upgrading the Twelve Foot Davis Park, the Dr. Greene Cairn Site and the Peace River Provincial Recreation Area located within the Greene Valley Provincial Park. The conceptual design can be found at the Ministry of Tourism, Parks and Recreation website.

== Activities ==
Front country hiking and scenic viewing are available in the park. A drive along Highway 2 into the Town of Peace River and up Grouard Hill on Township Road 834B to Twelve Foot Davis gravesite offers sweeping views of the valley's high, tree-lined hills and meandering creeks that cut through the forest. There is also a wide variety of wildlife for viewing including moose, black bear, mule deer, white-tailed deer and various songbirds.

Twelve Foot Davis Park, Henry Fuller Davis’ gravesite is located within the Greene Valley Provincial Park on Grouard Hill overlooking the Peace, Smoky and Heart. Henry Fuller Davis, nicknamed Twelve Foot Davis was a gold prospector who struck it rich on a 12-foot plot of land.

Dr. Greene Cairn located in Greene Valley Provincial Park is a historical fixture that remembers Dr. William Greene for his contributions to the community and to the organizations to which he belonged to. In addition to being a medical doctor and dentist, a 1910 edition of New York Sun identifies him as one of the first eight men to fly.

== Peace River Provincial Recreation Area ==
Peace River Provincial Recreation Area is located east of the Town of Peace River on one of the many terraces of Grouard Hill within Greene Valley Provincial Park off Township Road 834B (which becomes 100 Avenue in the Town of Peace River). It covers an area of 13.05 acres (52,800 m^{2}). The recreation area features trails for hiking and mountain biking, and a picnic eating area overlooking the town of Peace River and the Peace and Smoky rivers' confluence.

== See also ==
- List of provincial parks in Alberta
- List of Canadian provincial parks
- List of National Parks of Canada
