= Heart River (Alberta) =

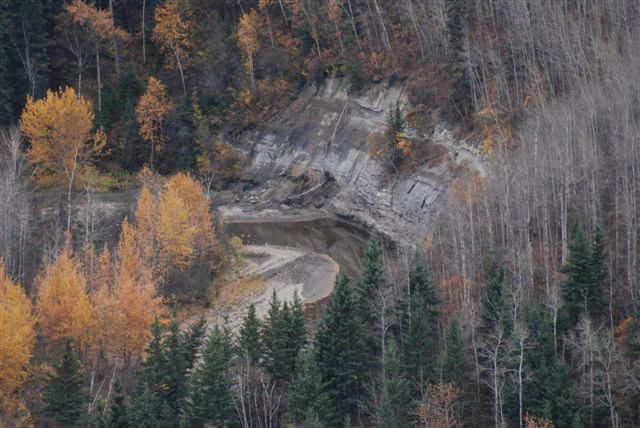
- The Heart River in the Town of Peace River

Location
- Country: Canada
- Province: Alberta

Physical characteristics
- Source
  - location: Northern Sunrise County
  - coordinates: 56.08186°N 116.52739°W
  - elevation: 745 m (2,444 ft)
- Mouth
  - location: Peace River
  - coordinates: 56.23047°N 117.29169°W
  - elevation: 320 m (1,050 ft)
- Basin size: 1,900 km^{2} (730 sq mi)

Basin features
- River system: Peace River

The Heart River is a river in northern Alberta, Canada. It is a major tributary of the Peace River.

The motto of the village of Nampa, Alberta is A Place close to the Heart, a reference to the river flowing through the community.

== Course ==
The Heart River originates in Northern Sunrise County in Alberta, at an elevation of 745 meters (2,444 ft). It flows north through an unnamed lake, then turns westwards as it heads through Harmon Valley Park. It receives the waters from the Harmon Valley Creek as it passes by the settlement of Harmon Valley, then turns south. Up until this point, it is the North Heart River as differentiated from the South Heart River. It receives the waters of Bearhead Creek (also carrying waters from the Benjamin Creek from the east), then turns again westward. It is paralleled by the Mackenzie Northern Railway as it passes by the hamlet of Reno and through the village of Nampa. Heart River then receives Myrtle Creek, which is flowing north just east of the village of Nampa. It is crossed by Highway 2, then continues westwards by the hamlet of Marie-Reine, then turns north and flows through a 150 meters (490 ft) deep canyon through the Greene Valley Provincial Park. It then empties in the Peace River, immediately downstream from the Smoky River mouth, at an elevation of 320 meters (1,050 ft), within the Peace River town limits.

Heart River drains an area of approximately 1,900 km^{2} (730 sq mi). The watershed can be categorized into three major sub-basins: the North Heart River whose drainage area is about 830 km^{2}; Bearhead Creek including Benjamin Creek whose drainage area is about 773 km^{2} and Myrtle Creek including the Nampa South Drainage Project whose drainage area is 201 km^{2}.

== Tributaries ==
- Harmon Valley Creek
- Bearhead Creek
  - Benjamin Creek
- Myrtle Creek

== See also ==
- List of rivers of Alberta
