= Pat's Creek (Alberta) =

Creek in Canada

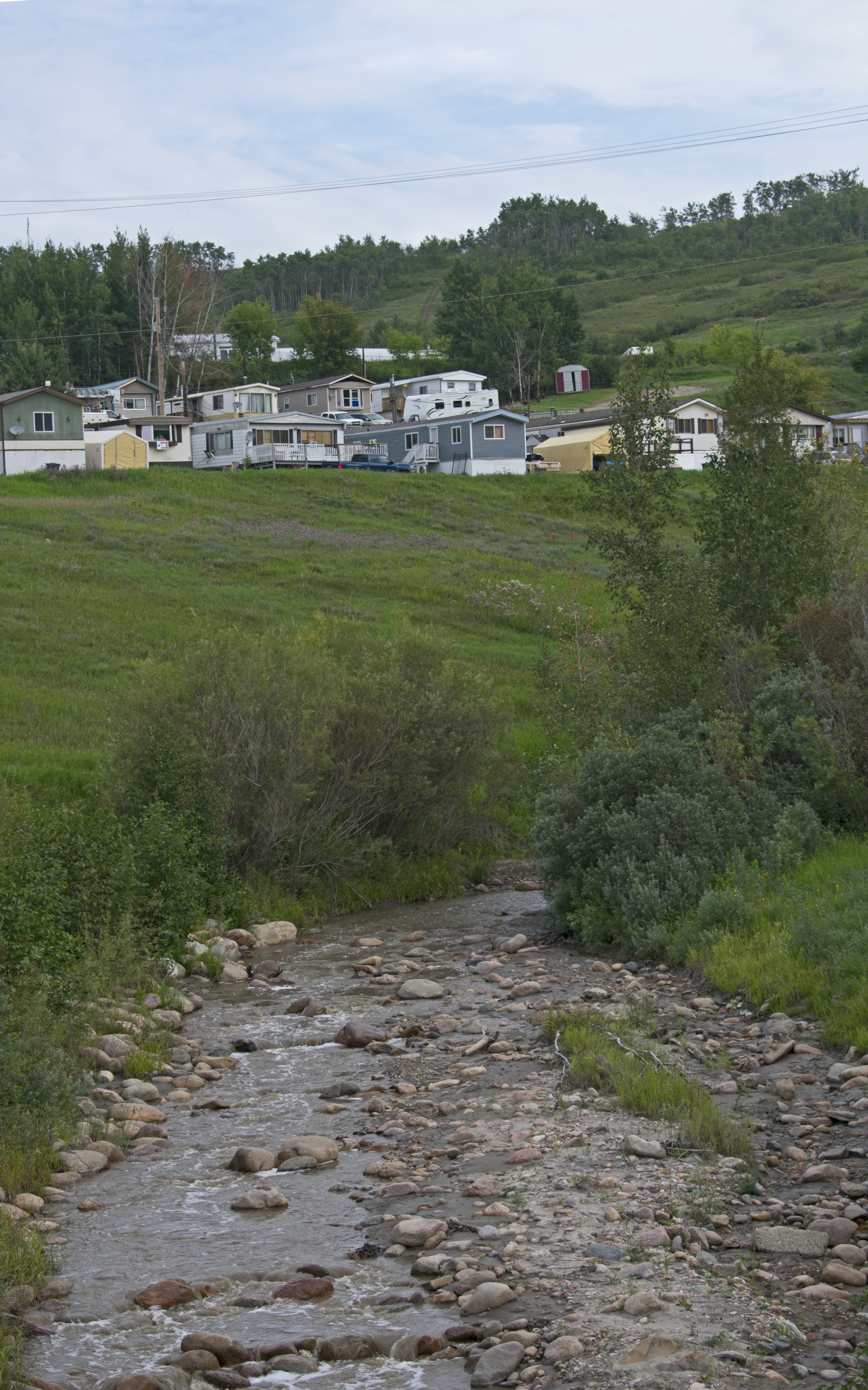
- Pat's Creek in Peace River

- Location of mouth in Alberta

Location
- Country: Canada
- Province: Alberta

Physical characteristics
- Source
  - location: Northern Sunrise County
  - coordinates: 56.216313°N 116.967244°W
  - elevation: 745 m (2,444 ft)
- Mouth
  - location: Peace River
  - coordinates: 56.23339°N 117.297084°W
  - elevation: 320 m (1,050 ft)

Basin features
- River system: Peace River

Pat's Creek is a tributary of the Peace River in northern Alberta, Canada, whose mouth is located within the Town of Peace River.

It is named after Patrick Wesley, a Métis man who lived in a cabin adjacent to the creek on his property. He deeded to the Anglican Church 5 acres of his land, including the creek, as tokens of his appreciation for care given to him during his final days in the battle with smallpox.

== Course ==
Pat's Creek originates in Northern Sunrise County, Alberta at an elevation of 745 meters (2,444 ft). It is formed by two legs from two separate sets of small connected unnamed lakes east of the community of St. Isidore. Flowing westwards, it receives waters from a small unnamed creek just east of St. Isidore and then passes the community just to the north of it less than 500 m away curving deep ravines on its course. Pat's Creek then receives another slightly larger creek just west of the community before being crossed by Highway 688 while flowing northwesterly. It continues westwards then southwesterly flowing between Kaufmann and Grouard hills. It is then channeled in 3 metre culvert for the remaining 1.5 kilometre under the roads, sidewalks, and parks of the Town of Peace River, before emerging to join the Peace River at an elevation of 320 meters (1,050 ft).

=== Contemporary history ===
==== Flooding ====
While the open creek through town posed a flooding concern especially during spring break-up, several days of torrential rains on July 2, 1935 caused the Pat's Creek burst its banks sending water gushing down Main Street Peace River along with and tree debris. The rains and flood waters from the tributaries caused the Peace River to rise more than 6.1 meters (20 ft) above its normal July levels.

==== Highway slumpage ====
Highway 2 used to follow Pat's Creek into the Town of Peace River but had to be abandoned due to massive landslides on the section between Grouard Hill and Kauffman Hill. It is currently a 3 km (1.9 mi) wilderness interpretive trail above the creek.

== See also ==
- List of rivers of Alberta
