= Peace River Wildland Provincial Park =

Provincial park in Alberta, Canada

- The confluence of the Smoky and Peace rivers in the Peace River Wildland Provincial Park

- Location within Alberta
- Interactive map of Peace River Wildland Provincial Park
- Location: Birch Hills County, Northern Sunrise County
- Nearest city: Peace River
- Coordinates: 55°59′17″N 117°46′06″W
- Area: 253 km^{2} (98 sq mi)
- Governing body: Alberta Community Development

Peace River Wildland Provincial Park is located in the valley of the Peace River stretching from Dunvegan Provincial Park to the Smoky River confluence and 30 kilometers upstream of the Smoky River valley. Also included in the park is the Spirit River valley at the confluence with the Peace. While most of the park lies in the Birch Hills County, some of it is in the Northern Sunrise County immediately south of the Town of Peace River.

The Peace River Wildland Provincial Park preserves the forest and grassland habitats within the Peace River valleys since these areas are important wildlife corridors for deer, elk, wolf, bears and is also home to a wide variety of birds.

National Historic Site, Fort Fork Site is also located in the park on the east bank of the Peace River. The fort was built in 1792 by the North West Company. Explorers Alexander Mackenzie and David Thompson spent the winters at Fort Fork in 1792 and 1802 respectively. The fort was abandoned in 1805 and has since been almost completed eroded by the Peace River. A flag planted at Fort Fork's former site is all that remains. Mackenzie Cairn was erected on River Lot 19 along Shaftesbury Trail in the Municipal District of Peace No. 135 in 1929 to commemorate Fort Fork.

== Activities ==
The confluence of the Peace and Smoky is dotted with small islands, some of which create slow moving waters and good fishing opportunities. Fish species include: Arctic Grayling, Brook Stickleback, Bull Trout, Burbot, Emerald Shiner, Flathead Chub, Goldeye, Kokanee, Lake Chub, Lake Trout, Lake Whitefish, Longnose Dace, Longnose Sucker, Mountain Whitefish, Ninespine Stickleback, Northern Pike, Northern Pikeminnow, Pearl Dace, Prickly Sculpin, Rainbow Trout, Redside Shiner, Slimy Sculpin, Spoonhead Sculpin, Spottail Shiner, Trout-Perch, Walleye, White Sucker and Yellow Perch.

Road access is limited although the Peace River Wildland Provincial Park features a number of trails for hiking, off-highway vehicle riding and snowmobiling. There are also viewing points located strategically in the park.

== Tangent Park ==
Tangent Park is a park operated by Birch Hills County located 24 kilometres southwest of the Town of Peace River, and 33 kilometres northwest of Tangent on Highway 740 within the Peace River Wildland Provincial Park. It is adjacent to the Peace River and offers full hook ups, kitchen shelter, group picnic area, group camping area, tenting area, horse watering stations, concession, showers, hiking trails, horseshoes, a playground, and fishing.

=== Shaftesbury Ferry ===
The Shaftesbury Ferry operates on the Shaftesbury Trail (Highway 740) crossing over the 325-metre-long Peace River crossing from the M.D. of Peace to the Birch Hills County. With a 38 T capacity, the 22.56-metre-long by 12.12-metre-wide by 1.22-meter-hull-depth ferry was built in 1962 and has a rated capacity of 2 crew, 46 passengers and 8 mid-size cars. Access to Tangent Park from the Town of Peace River involves a ride on this ferry. It is operated by Grimshaw based LaPrairie Works.

In winter, an ice road is built across the Peace River at this crossing location.

== Gallery ==
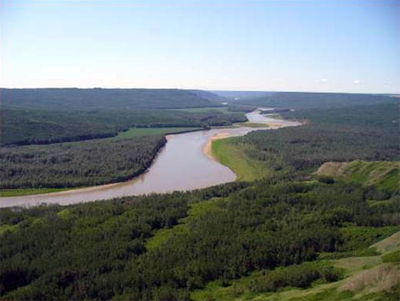
The Smoky River from a view point in the Peace River Wildland Provincial Park

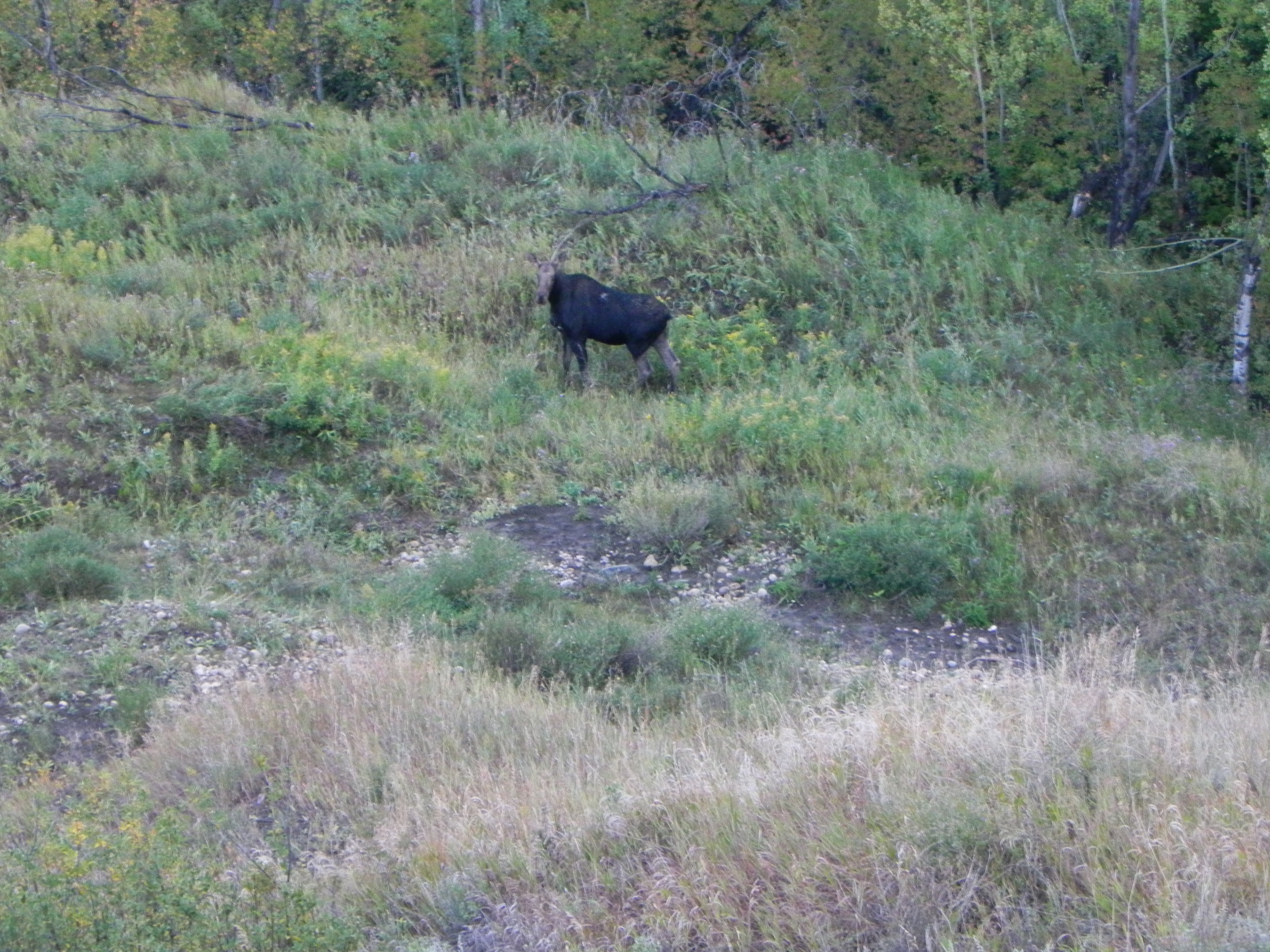
Wildlife in Peace River Wildland Provincial Park as viewed from Sagitawa Lookout

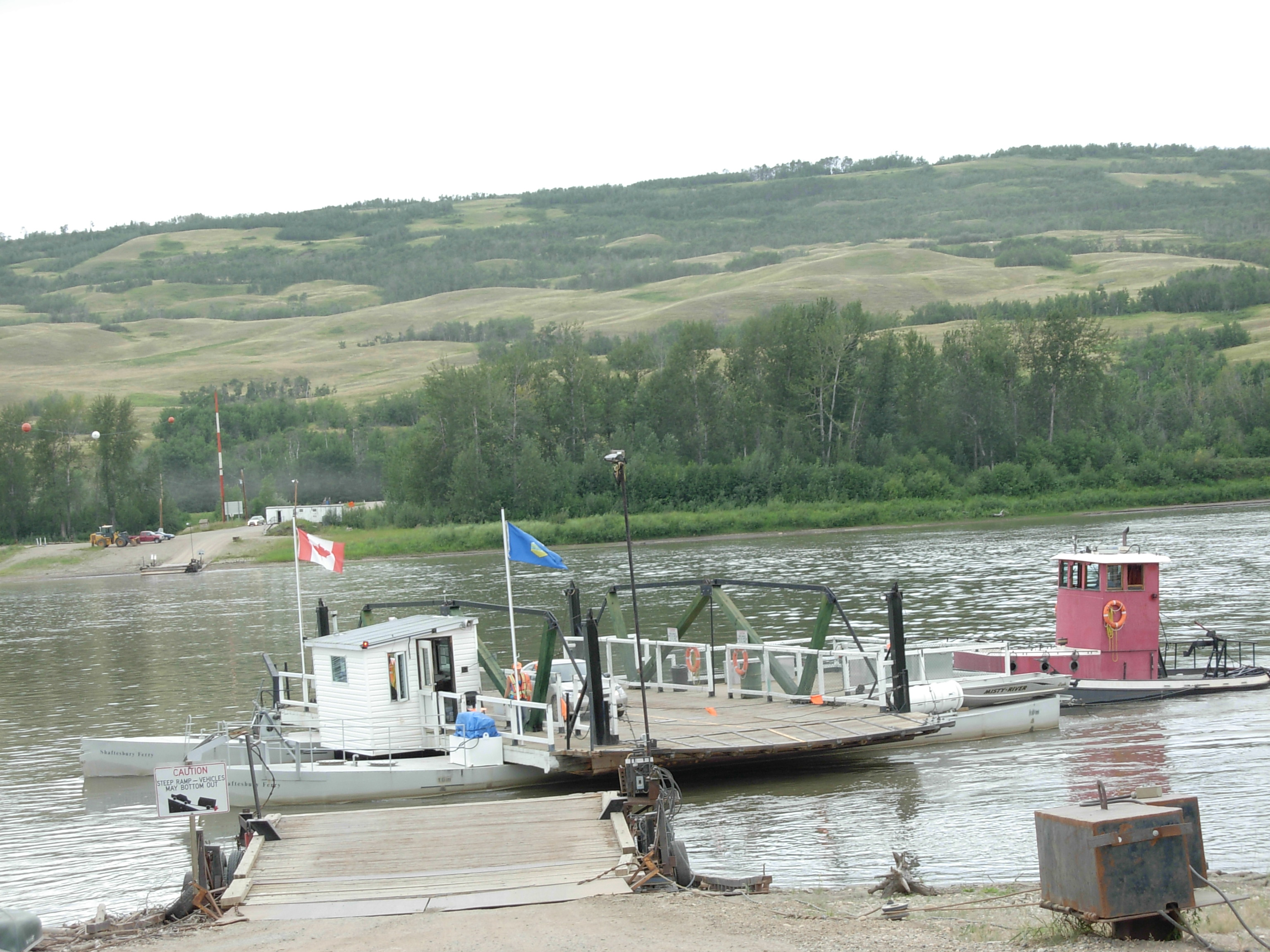
The Shaftesbury Ferry on the Peace River

== See also ==
- List of provincial parks in Alberta
- List of Canadian provincial parks
- List of National Parks of Canada
