= Peace River, Alberta =

Peace River Peace River Crossing (1898–1916) Rivière-la-Paix (French)
- Town
- Town of Peace River
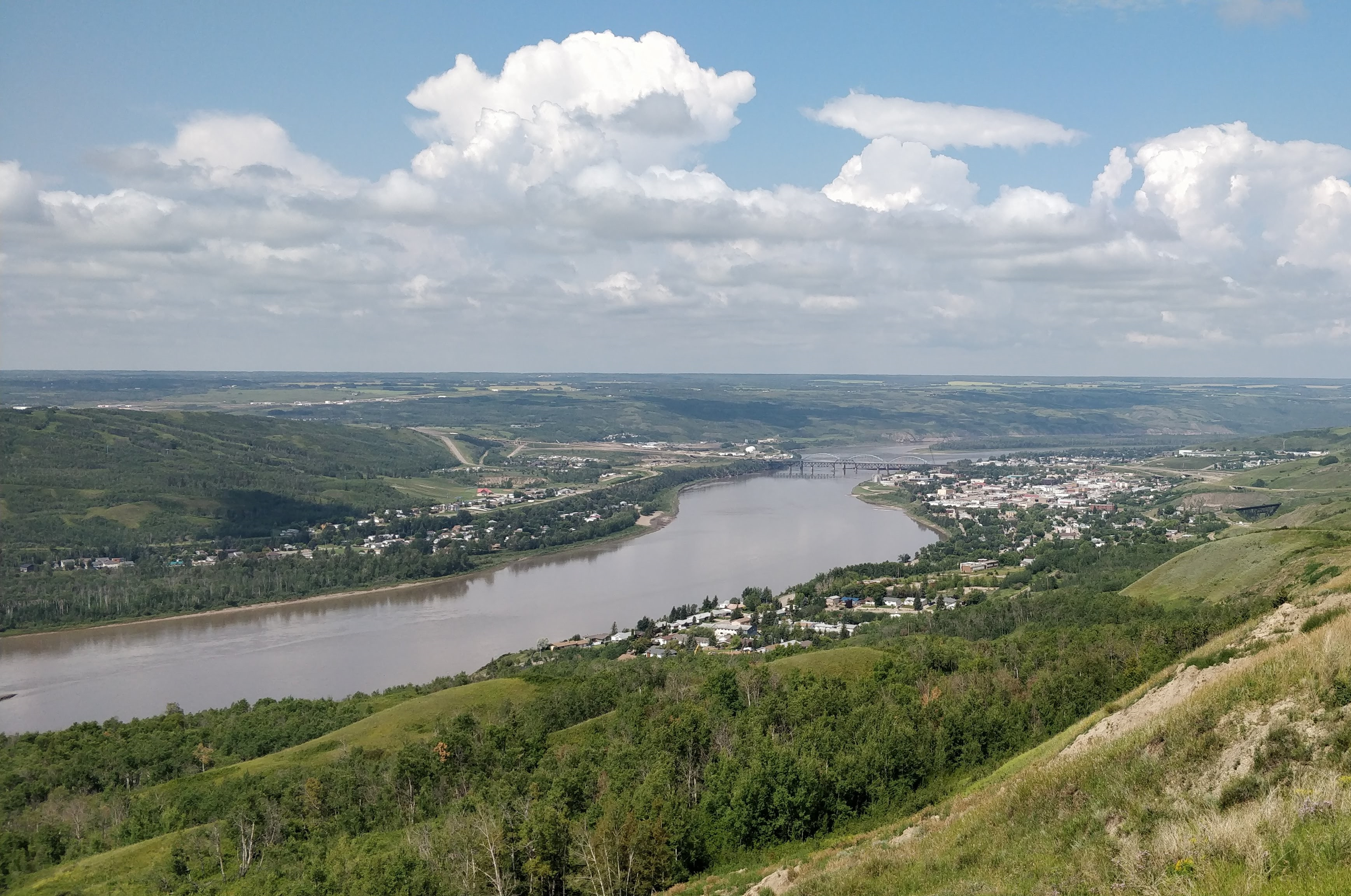
- Peace River seen from the Sagitawa Lookout

- Coat of arms

- Location in the MD of Peace No. 135

- Location of Peace River in Alberta Peace River (Canada) Peace River (North America)
- Coordinates: 56°14′09″N 117°17′55″W
- Country: Canada
- Province: Alberta
- Region Sub-region: Northern Alberta
- Planning region: Upper Peace
- Adjacent municipal districts: Municipal District of Peace No. 135, County of Northern Lights and Northern Sunrise County
- Incorporated
  - Village: 2 June 1914 (as Peace River Crossing)
  - Name change: 22 May 1916
  - Town: 1 December 1919

Government
  - Mayor: Shelly Marie Shannon
  - Governing body: Peace River Town Council: Olayemi Babalola; Brad Carr; Orren Ford; Brandon Dous; Robin Dale Erickson; Jeffrey Forsythe
  - CAO: Barb Miller
  - MP: Arnold Viersen
  - MLA: Daniel Williams

Area (2021)
  - Land: 25.34 km^{2} (9.78 sq mi)
- Elevation: 330 m (1,080 ft)

Population (2021)
  - Total: 6,619
  - Density: 261.2/km^{2} (677/sq mi)
- Time zone: UTC−06:00 (Alberta Time)
- Forward sortation area: T8S
- Area codes: +1-780, +1-587, +1-825
- Highways: Highway 2; Highway 684; Highway 743; Highway 744
- Waterways: Peace River; Smoky River; Heart River; Pat's Creek
- Website: peaceriver.ca

Peace River (originally named Peace River Crossing and known as Rivière-la-Paix in French) is a town in northwest Alberta, Canada. It is along the banks of the Peace River at its confluence with the Smoky River, the Heart River and Pat's Creek. It is approximately 486 kilometres (302 mi) northwest of Edmonton and 198 kilometres (123 mi) northeast of Grande Prairie on Highway 2. It was known as the Village of Peace River Crossing between 1914 and 1916.

The Peace River townsite is nearly 1,000 feet (300 m) below the relatively flat terrain surrounding it. Pat's Creek used to be an open channel through the town but is now channelled through a culvert under the town streets, re-emerging at the mouth on the Peace River at the Riverfront Park.

The population in the Town of Peace River was 6,729 in 2011, a 6.6% increase over its 2006 population. There are significant nodal settlements and subdivisions in the vicinity of the town on acreages along Highway 2 to the west, Highways 684 (Shaftesbury Trail) and 743 as well as the southwest portion of Northern Sunrise County. Regionally, there are various First Nation communities to the northeast, French-Canadian farming communities to the south and to the east, and Mennonite and Hutterite German-Canadian farming communities to the north and northwest of the town.

Peace River was the site of the 2004 Alberta Winter Games. In 2010, Peace River, in conjunction with Grimshaw and surrounding municipalities, jointly hosted the 2010 Alberta Summer Games.

== History ==
After the last glacial ice sheets melted from the northern parts of the Canadian prairies, an ice-free corridor allowed people from Asia to make a way deep into the Americas. When the Ice Age ended, many of these groups moved back north following the large herds of grazing animals which were, in turn, following the grasses northward in the warming climate. In the Peace River area, the two major language groups were the Athapaskan and the Algonquian.

In 1670, following the arrival of the Hudson's Bay Company in Eastern Canada, guns began making their way westward as trade goods and the Algonquian speaking Cree began pushing the Athapaskan speakers Dunne-za or Beaver further west. The Beaver in turn pushed the Sekani deep into the Rocky Mountain Trench in the mid-18th century. A truce was eventually agreed to by the Cree and the Beaver and the great river they called Unchagah (the Peace River) became the boundary between their hunting territories.

The North West Company pushed westward in the late 18th century in an attempt to reach the Pacific Ocean, creating rivalry with the other major fur-trading company, the Hudson's Bay Company.

=== Timeline ===
- 1792: Alexander MacKenzie established Fort Fork on the eastern bank of Peace River just south of its confluence with the Smoky River.
- 1818, the HBC opens the first Fort St. Mary's at the forks of the Peace and the Smoky, it lasted for only one season
- 1820, the HBC built Fort St. Mary's III on the west side of the Peace River, directly across from the mouth of the Heart River (in the present day Town of Peace River). This was the third and final relocation of Fort St. Mary's
- 1886: The Anglican Church sets up the first mission on Shaftesbury Trail.
- 1888: The Roman Catholic Church sets up St. Augustine mission on Shaftesbury Trail.
- 1898: The North-West Mounted Police make a permanent post at Peace River Crossing.
- 1909: The townsite of Peace River is first surveyed.
- 1914: Peace River Landing Settlement is incorporated as the Village of Peace River Crossing on 2 June.
- 1914: Peace River's first hospital, the Irene Cottage Hospital, opens
- 1910-1916: Railway reaches the area and settlers begin colonizing the valley.
- 1916: Village of Peace River Crossing is renamed the Village of Peace River on 22 May.
- 1919: Village of Peace River is incorporated as the Town of Peace River on 1 December.
- 1926-1931: The population continues to grow as the Great Depression took hold of Saskatchewan and Southern Alberta.

=== Historical sites and architecture ===
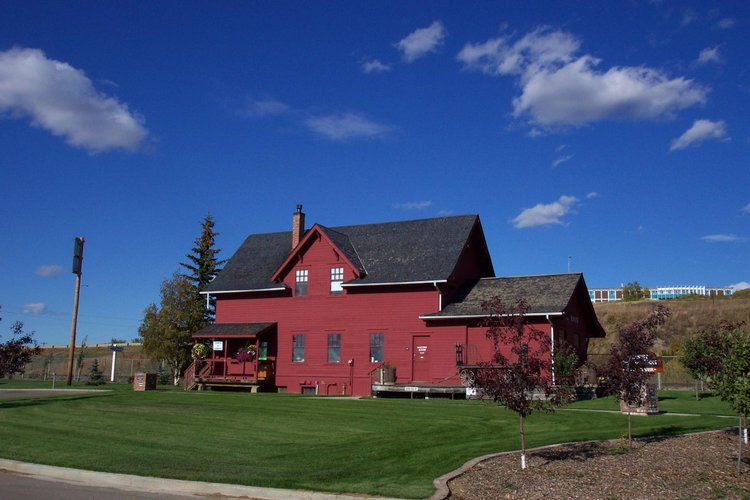
The NAR train station in the Town of Peace River.

The Northern Alberta Railway (NAR) station was built in 1916 by the Central Canada Railway. It served as a major hub of activity from 1916 to 1956 for passengers. The station was continued for use for freight until the station was closed in 1981. The NAR station suffered a fire in 1986. It was restored back to its former state in 1991, costing nearly $300,000 to complete. It currently houses the Tourist Information Centre in Peace River. It is located on 94 Avenue block of 100 Street next to the railway tracks that cross through Peace River.

The NAR station was used again as a railway station for first time in about 30 years by passengers when the Alberta Prairie Steam Tours, owners of the passenger cars, sent eight coaches to Peace River in September 2006, thereby enabling riders to travel like the pioneers of the area did in the 1920s. It involved short trips to DMI, a pulp mill 20 kilometres north of the Town of Peace River, and to Grimshaw. The train ride also included on-board entertainment.

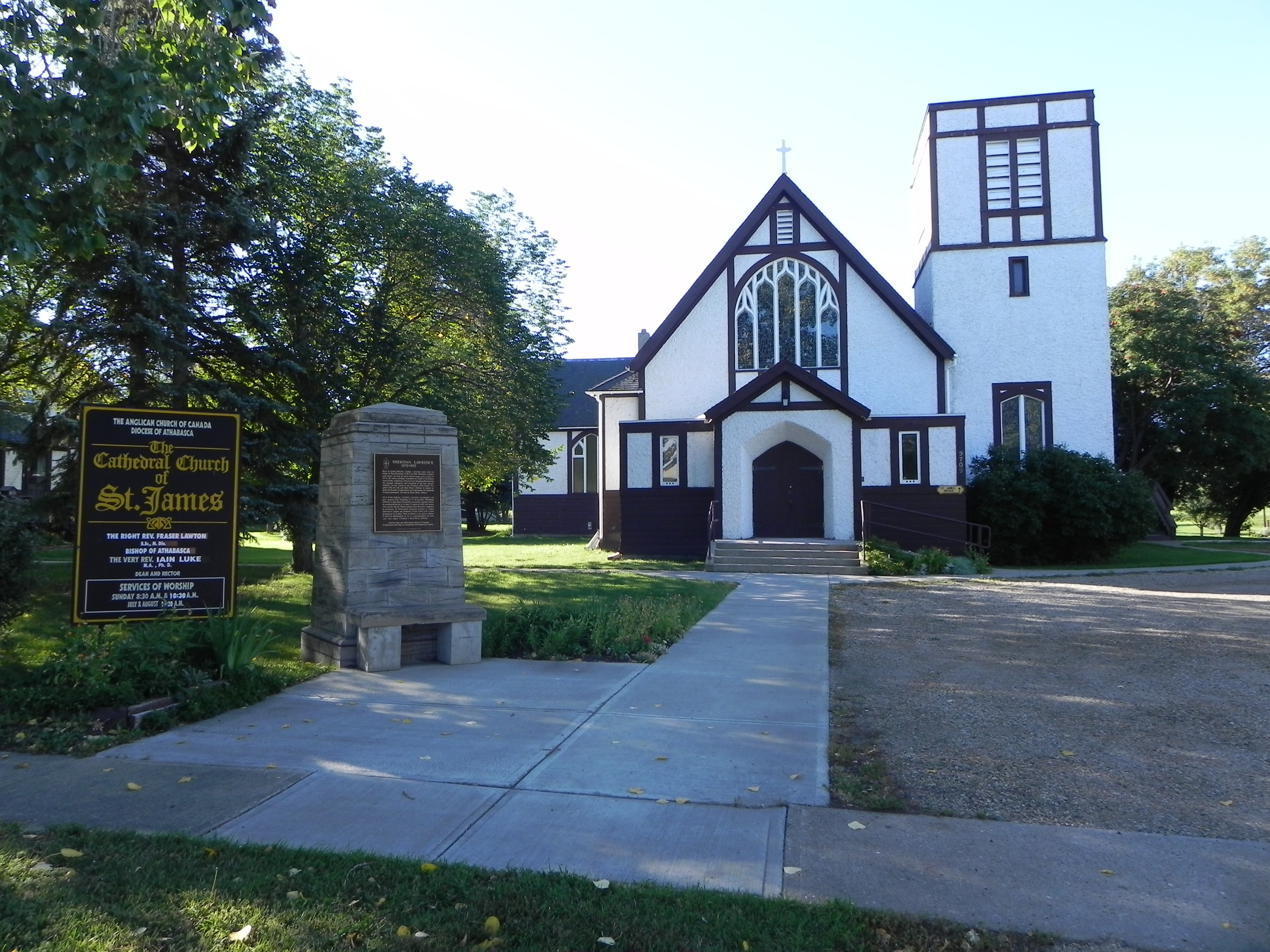
The Anglican Church in Peace River

The Catholic St. Augustine Mission located along Shaftesbury Trail on River Lot 22 was established in 1888 when the missionaries first came to the Peace country to evangelize and educate the First Nations people. Alongside the mission is an old cemetery. This site is located within the Peace River Provincial Correctional Centre which was built in 1968.

Third Mission Heritage Suites located at 100 Avenue block of 98 Street adjacent to Riverfront Park and across from the original Hudson's Bay Factor's House (1904). was formerly the priests’ house that was moved by CAT over the ice to Peace River in 1958 and functioned as residential apartments before being renovated into a hotel suite.

Anglican Mission Site was established on River Lot 11 on Shaftesbury Trail in 1886, all that remains now is a small cemetery.

The St. James Anglican Cathedral Church was built in 1936. The parish also erected Athabasca Hall around the same time adjacent to it. With the Athabasca Hall being the largest facility in town at that time, the hall bookings became too much for the parish decided to lease it to the Peace River Recreation Board in 1972 for 20 years. In 1979, the parish's first dean emeritus sold it to the Town of Peace River and used the proceeds to add a new church hall connected to the cathedral.

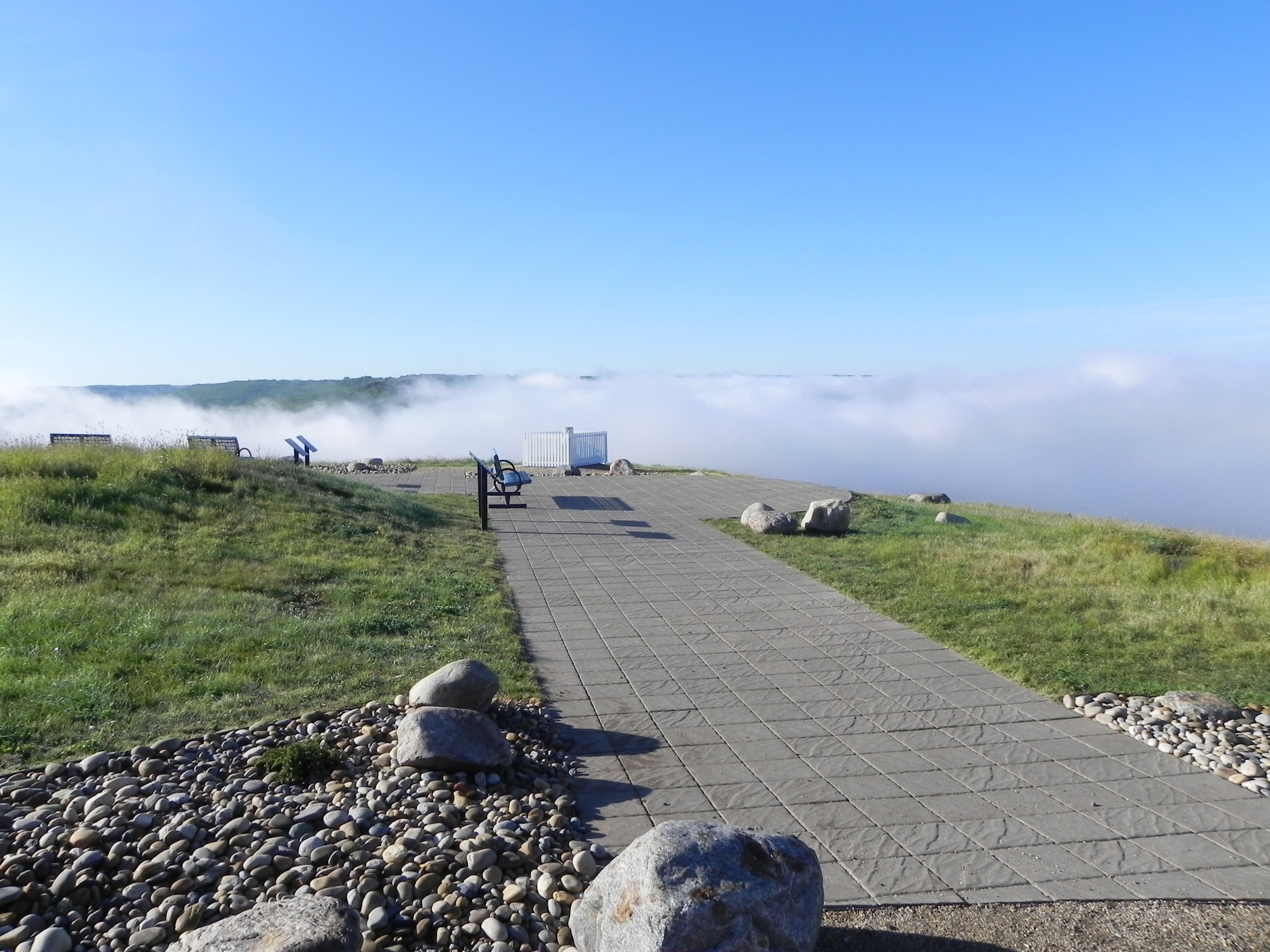
Twelve-Foot Davis grave site on top of Grouard Hill

The McNamara Hotel was built in 1921 by Martin Joseph McNamara. It has burnt down twice in the past; once in 1926 and 1993, and rebuilt both times.

Fort Fork site, located in the Peace River Wildland Provincial Park is a national historic site. The fort was erected in 1792 by the North West Company. Alexander Mackenzie wintered at Fort Fork in 1792 as did David Thompson in 1802. The fort was abandoned in 1805 and has since been almost completed eroded by the Peace River. A flag planted at Fort Fork's former site is all that remains. Mackenzie Cairn was erected on River Lot 19 in the Municipal District (M.D.) of Peace No. 135 in 1929 to commemorate Fort Fork.

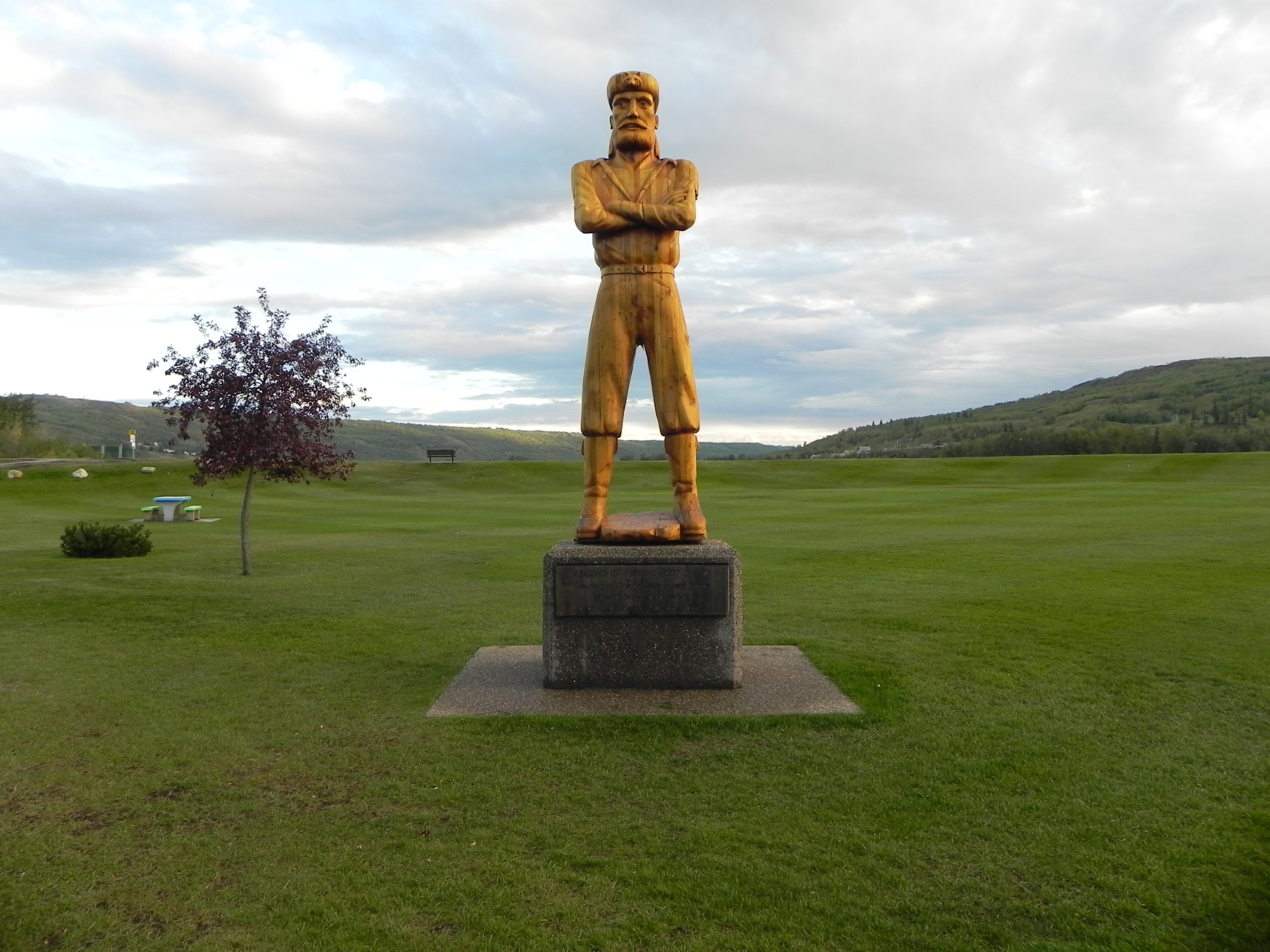
12-ft-tall statue of Twelve-Foot Davis at Riverfront Park

A 12-foot-tall (3.7 m) wooden statue stands at the Riverfront Park in Peace River to commemorate Henry Fuller Davis, one of the most famous figures in the Town of Peace River's history. His “Twelve-Foot Davis” nickname stems from the 12-foot land claim during the Cariboo Country gold rush in British Columbia which netted him almost $30,000 worth of gold. He took these profits and staked it all on a trading post close to where the Town of Peace River stands today. It is for this reason that the Town of Peace River is sometimes referred to as the Land of Twelve-Foot Davis. Twelve-Foot Davis' gravesite is designated a park and is located on the top of Grouard Hill just east of the town.

Dr. Greene Cairn located in Greene Valley Provincial Park is a historical fixture that remembers Dr. William Greene for his contributions to the community and to the organizations to which he belonged to. Born and raised in San Francisco, Dr. Greene was a medical doctor and dentist in addition to being among first eight men to fly, according to a 1910 edition of New York Sun.

== Geography ==
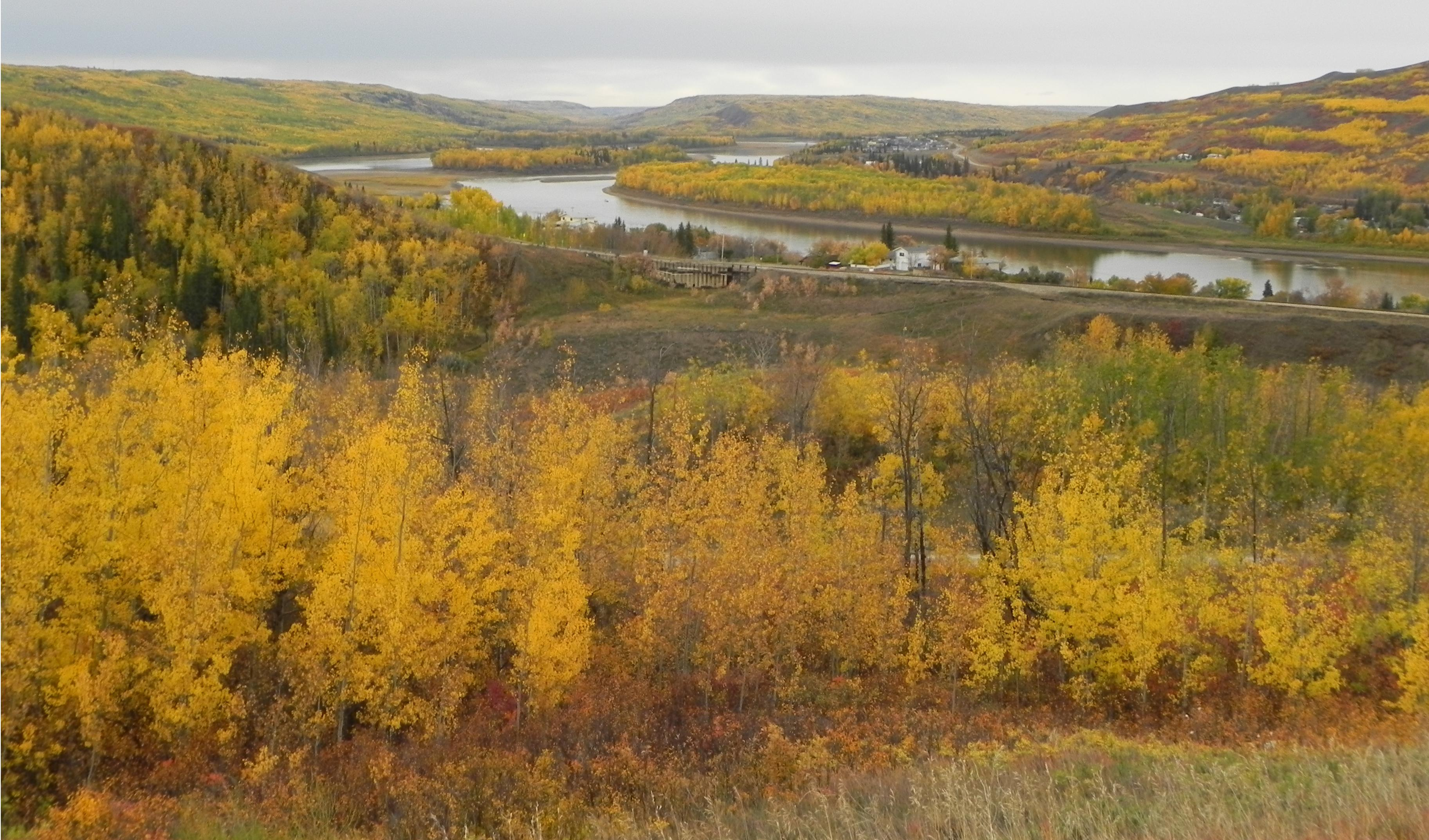
The Peace River as it winds past the town.

Physiographically, the Town of Peace River lies within the Peace River Formation, a stratigraphical unit of middle Albian age in the Western Canadian Sedimentary Basin. The area developed on sediments of the former lake bottom of Glacial Lake Peace, which covered most of the areas in the region that were below 610 m in elevation.

The specific landform in which the town is situated is the Peace River Lowland which was incised by the Peace River and its tributaries right through the area's former glacial lake sediments and into the Cretaceous bedrock. The Peace River Lowlands is flanked by the Buffalo Head Hills to the east and the Whitemud and Clear Hills to the west.

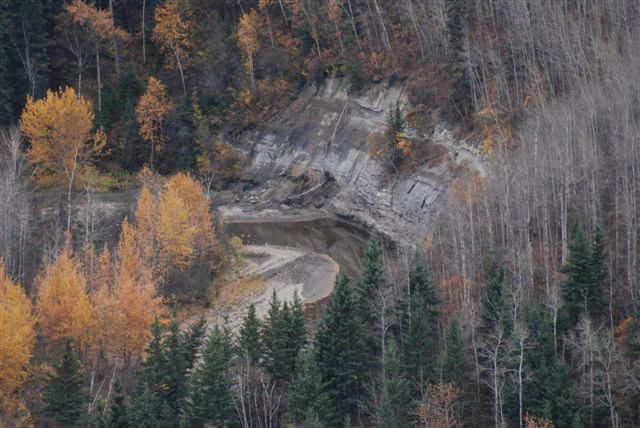
The Heart River valley within the town.

The general area is categorized ecologically as aspen parkland with mixedwood stands understory. There is a variety of wetland habitats in the area with several being quite marshy with shallow water, soft bottoms, and abundant aquatic vegetation. Some of the lakes and sloughs are used by various waterfowls, both migrating and resident, for nesting. The parkland also supports a host of terrestrial and aquatic animals. It is also Canada's most northerly agricultural region.

The Greene Valley Provincial Park lies just east of the town in the Northern Sunrise County and the Peace River Wildland Provincial Park is to the south on the east bank of the Peace River. These parks and the rest of the river valley, including some river islands, provide habitat for wildlife such as moose, deer, bear, coyotes, bats, reptiles, birds and numerous fish species. Maintaining natural areas in the river valley and limiting use to suitable recreational use has minimized impacts to wildlife habitat.

Historically, the town has been the subject of flooding. However, the town has developed a continuous dike system to prevent flood damage from to 1:100 year flood events and protect against ice-jam floods. As a result, the risk of flooding has been significantly reduced and no longer poses the same threat to the town.

On 30 November 2022, starting at 16:55 local time, a series of seismic events occurred to the southeast of Peace River. At 17:55, a 5.59-magnitude earthquake at an approximate depth of 6 km (3.7 mi) struck the area. Researchers at Stanford University later said the seismic event was likely to have been caused by human activities linked to the local gas-and-oil extraction industry. No damage or injuries were reported. On 16 March 2023, three slightly smaller tremors occurred less than 1.6 km (1 mile) away from the site of the original event. This was Canada's largest induced earthquake.

=== Climate ===
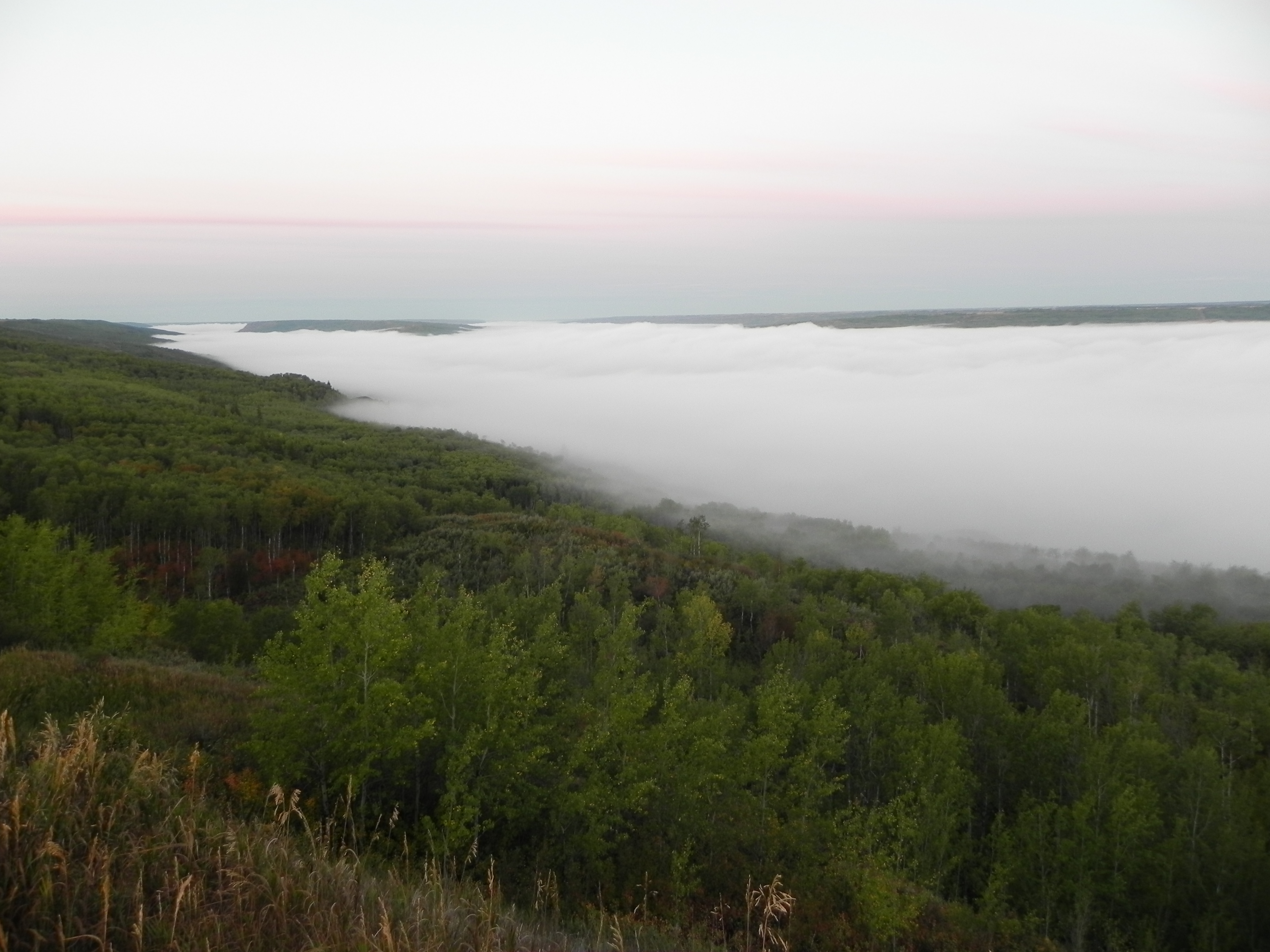
Early morning fog in the Peace River valley

The Peace River area is generally characterized by a humid continental climate (Köppen climate classification Dfb) with low year-round precipitation. Its dry climate results in reduced humidity throughout the year.

Moisture coming with Pacific Ocean air is lost over the mountain ranges as precipitation before moving into the area, while air from the Arctic flows uninterrupted into the region. Due to cold air drainage, the river valley is often completely filled with stratus and fog while outside the valley is clear. The fog usually clears in a few hours. Winds in town are channeled along the Peace River valley (towards the northeast or southwest) while winds outside the valley are quite variable. During both summer and winter, the wind patterns outside the valley are mostly from the southwest or north. The passage of a migratory low to the north of Peace River will cause southwest winds to shift around to the north.

Winters are often cold enough to see the formation of an ice cover on the Peace River from January to late March or early April. The ice cover is composed of juxtaposed frazil ice pans and break-away border ice pieces that consolidate in the river flow direction. This produces a very jagged surface. The formation of ice cover results in a gradual increase in river water levels in town and is monitored by both Alberta Environment and BC Hydro. BC Hydro operates two hydroelectric dams on the Peace River in British Columbia: the W. A. C. Bennett Dam and Peace Canyon Dam. These dams have significant effect on the Peace River's water levels.

Summer frequently features thunderstorms that are preceded with persistent winds and occasionally produce small grain-sized hail. Tornadoes and severe winds are a rarity in the Peace River area, although it is suspected that Grimshaw, a town 20 kilometres to the west, was struck by a tornado on 30 June 2003.

Due to Peace River's northerly latitude, the summer solstice on 21 June brings 17 hours and 41 minutes of daylight. This turns around in when the area sees less than seven hours of daylight during the winter solstice on 21 December. Regardless of the season, when there is daylight out, Peace River will usually have sunny skies. There is on average 2,060 hours of sunshine every year.

An exposed field will have a different microclimate than sheltered locations. The temperature in the Peace River valley has been observed to be up to 5 °C warmer than that of the prairie land surrounding it. The unique micro-climate tends to help vegetables thrive in the Peace River valley.

The coldest temperature ever recorded was −56.7 °C (−70 °F) on 12 January 1911. The highest temperature ever recorded in Peace River was 38.9 °C (102 °F) on 4 July 1926. The record high daily minimum was 25.0 °C (77.0 °F) recorded July 20, 1956. The record highest dew point was 23.6 °C (74.5 °F) recorded June 30, 2021. The most humid month was July 1958 with an average dew point of 14.0 °C (57.2 °F). The warmest month was July 1958 with an average mean temperature of 21.0 °C (69.8 °F), and an average monthly daily minimum of 16.2 °C (61.2 °F). August 1981 recorded the highest monthly average daily maximum of 26.6 °C (79.9 °F). July 2012 set a record of no maximum temperature below 21.2 °C (70.2 °F) for the entire month; July 2004 with no temperature below C, and July 2020 with no dew point below 6.6 °C (43.9 °F).

The lowest yearly maximum dew point is 14.2 °C (57.6 °F) recorded in 1995. The lowest yearly maximum daily minimum temperature is 12.8 °C (55.0 °F) recorded in 1966. The lowest yearly maximum temperature is 26.7 °C (80.1 °F) recorded in 1976.

The average yearly maximum dew point is 17.4 °C (63.3 °F) and the average yearly maximum daily minimum temperature is 15.3 °C (59.5 °F).

Peace River

Climate chart (precipitation, max. and min. temperature)
J	F	M	A	M	J	J	A	S	O	N	D
23 −10 −20	13 −6 −17	15 −1 −12	19 9 −3	40 17 3	68 21 8	62 23 10	43 22 8	40 16 3	21 8 −3	20 −3 −12	20 −8 −18
- █ Average max. and min. temperatures in °C
- █ Precipitation totals in mm
- Source: Environment Canada
Imperial conversion
J	F	M	A	M	J	J	A	S	O	N	D
0.9 14 −4	0.5 21 1	0.6 31 11	0.8 49 27	1.6 63 38	2.7 69 47	2.4 73 50	1.7 71 47	1.6 61 38	0.8 47 27	0.8 28 11	0.8 17 −1
- █ Average max. and min. temperatures in °F
- █ Precipitation totals in inches

Climate data for Peace River Airport, 1991–2020 normals, extremes 1907–present (Note: Climate data was recorded at Peace River Crossing from August 1907 to May 1935, and at Peace River Airport from January 1944 to present.)
Month	Jan	Feb	Mar	Apr	May	Jun	Jul	Aug	Sep	Oct	Nov	Dec	Year
Record high humidex	11.9	10.7	14.4	28.9	32.5	45.0	40.0	36.5	32.3	26.0	14.5	10.2	45.0
Record high °C (°F)	12.1 (53.8)	12.8 (55.0)	20.6 (69.1)	29.4 (84.9)	36.7 (98.1)	38.7 (101.7)	38.9 (102.0)	36.7 (98.1)	34.4 (93.9)	28.3 (82.9)	20.0 (68.0)	15.6 (60.1)	38.9 (102.0)
Mean maximum °C (°F)	5.6 (42.1)	5.5 (41.9)	10.0 (50.0)	19.6 (67.3)	26.3 (79.3)	27.8 (82.0)	29.4 (84.9)	29.2 (84.6)	25.3 (77.5)	19.2 (66.6)	8.0 (46.4)	4.8 (40.6)	30.8 (87.4)
Mean daily maximum °C (°F)	−9.9 (14.2)	−6.2 (20.8)	−.5 (31.1)	9.4 (48.9)	17.1 (62.8)	20.7 (69.3)	22.7 (72.9)	21.8 (71.2)	16.3 (61.3)	8.4 (47.1)	−2.5 (27.5)	−8.2 (17.2)	7.4 (45.3)
Daily mean °C (°F)	−15 (5)	−11.7 (10.9)	−6.2 (20.8)	3.3 (37.9)	10.2 (50.4)	14.5 (58.1)	16.3 (61.3)	15.0 (59.0)	9.8 (49.6)	2.9 (37.2)	−7.1 (19.2)	−13.2 (8.2)	1.6 (34.9)
Mean daily minimum °C (°F)	−20.1 (−4.2)	−17.2 (1.0)	−11.9 (10.6)	−2.9 (26.8)	3.3 (37.9)	8.1 (46.6)	9.9 (49.8)	8.2 (46.8)	3.3 (37.9)	−2.7 (27.1)	−11.6 (11.1)	−18.1 (−0.6)	−4.3 (24.3)
Mean minimum °C (°F)	−36.0 (−32.8)	−30.8 (−23.4)	−28.0 (−18.4)	−13.2 (8.2)	−4.0 (24.8)	2.2 (36.0)	4.3 (39.7)	1.8 (35.2)	−4.4 (24.1)	−12.4 (9.7)	−24.7 (−12.5)	−31.3 (−24.3)	−38.8 (−37.8)
Record low °C (°F)	−56.7 (−70.1)	−48.9 (−56.0)	−42.2 (−44.0)	−38.9 (−38.0)	−11.4 (11.5)	−4.4 (24.1)	−1.1 (30.0)	−3.7 (25.3)	−15.6 (3.9)	−30 (−22)	−42.2 (−44.0)	−53.9 (−65.0)	−56.7 (−70.1)
Record low wind chill	−57.5	−55.0	−52.1	−35.1	−20.0	−6.6	0.0	−6.1	−18.3	−34.6	−54.0	−58.4	−58.4
Average precipitation mm (inches)	22.5 (0.89)	13.3 (0.52)	15.3 (0.60)	19.4 (0.76)	39.6 (1.56)	68.1 (2.68)	62.1 (2.44)	42.6 (1.68)	40.3 (1.59)	20.5 (0.81)	20.2 (0.80)	20.4 (0.80)	384.2 (15.13)
Average rainfall mm (inches)	1.3 (0.05)	0.5 (0.02)	1.6 (0.06)	10.5 (0.41)	37.9 (1.49)	68.0 (2.68)	62.1 (2.44)	42.6 (1.68)	39.4 (1.55)	13.2 (0.52)	3.4 (0.13)	0.6 (0.02)	281.2 (11.07)
Average snowfall cm (inches)	25.2 (9.9)	15.9 (6.3)	17.8 (7.0)	10.8 (4.3)	2.1 (0.8)	0.1 (0.0)	0.0 (0.0)	0.0 (0.0)	1.3 (0.5)	9.1 (3.6)	21.1 (8.3)	24.4 (9.6)	127.7 (50.3)
Average precipitation days (≥ 0.2 mm)	11.0	7.3	8.3	6.7	9.6	12.1	13.9	10.5	10.2	9.8	10.6	10.1	120.3
Average rainy days (≥ 0.2 mm)	1.3	0.52	1.2	4.1	9.0	12.1	13.9	10.5	10.0	6.8	2.5	0.54	72.5
Average snowy days (≥ 0.2 cm)	10.7	7.3	7.8	3.2	1.1	0.04	0.0	0.0	0.46	4.0	9.3	9.8	53.8
Average dew point °C (°F)	−18.1 (−0.6)	−15.7 (3.7)	−11.5 (11.3)	−5.0 (23.0)	0.3 (32.5)	6.7 (44.1)	9.9 (49.8)	8.5 (47.3)	3.8 (38.8)	−2.5 (27.5)	−10.1 (13.8)	−16.1 (3.0)	−4.1 (24.6)
Source 1: Environment Canada
Source 2: weatherstats.ca (for dewpoint and monthly&yearly average absolute maximum&minimum temperature)

=== Contemporary issues ===
==== Urban planning ====
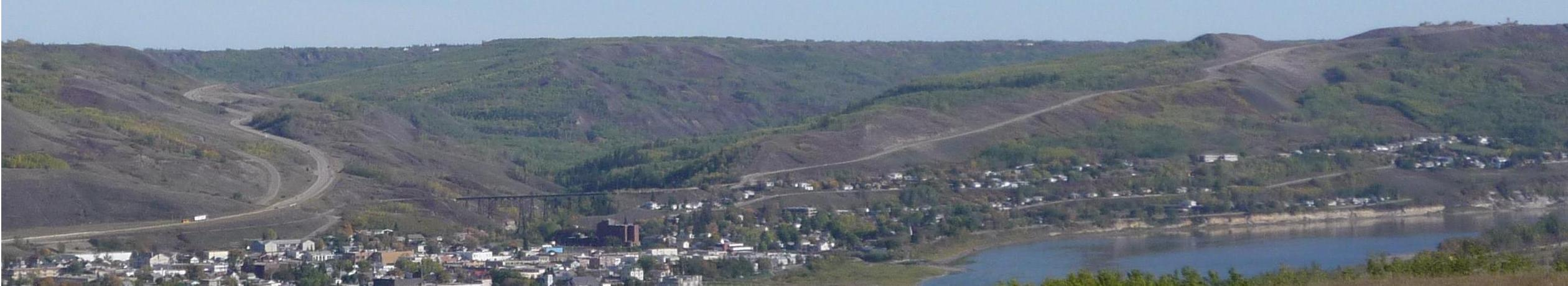
Peace River as seen from West Hill. The East Hill is to the left and Judah Hill to the right. Greene Valley Provincial Park is in the background.

The Town of Peace River is bounded by the M.D. of Peace No. 135 to the west and southwest, Northern Sunrise County to the east, the County of Northern Lights to the north and Birch Hills County further south at the confluence of the Peace and Smoky Rivers. In recognizing the need to plan for the growth of the Town of Peace River, the M.D. of Peace No. 135, Northern Sunrise County and the County of Northern Lights participated in the Peace River Inter-Municipal Development Plan (IDP) in July 1999. Through the adoption of the Peace River IDP, the four municipalities confirmed their commitment to cooperate and work together for the purpose of realizing the opportunities associated with the future growth of the Peace River area. The IDP addresses the future land use planning of the Peace River area, as well as other matters related to the physical, social and economic development of the region. The four municipalities are in the process of updating the IDP. In preparation for this, the municipalities also reviewed and updated their respective municipal development plans. While Northern Sunrise County established a serviced industrial area, the Sunrise Gateway Business Park on its own on the eastern boundary of the town, the M.D of Peace and County of Northern Lights included in their municipal development plans areas of joint development planning with the Town of Peace River on lands abutting the town to the north and to the west. The joint development planning was a partnership agreement to share the costs of servicing the lands and then jointly collecting taxes instead of the town annexing these lands. This was in response to the town's growing need for commercial and industrial land, and also part of its long-term plan to have industrial establishments on the scenic banks of the Peace River cede the riverfront to future residential development while gradually relocating to industrial parks now to be located away from the river bank.

With a land area of 24.87 km^{2} (9.60 sq mi), the population density in the Town of Peace River averages 253.9/km^{2} (658/sq mi) compared to Grimshaw's 352.1/km^{2} (912/sq mi) and Manning's 436.1/km^{2} (1,129/sq mi). The lower population density of Town of Peace River relative to surrounding communities is attributable, in part to the rugged terrain in the river valley. The town's 2010 Municipal Development Plan indicates that 14.50 km^{2} (5.60 sq mi) of the land base or 58.3% of the town's total land area is developable and 8.36 km^{2} (3.23 sq mi) has actually been developed. The density based on developed land is 755.38/km^{2} (1,956.4/sq mi). The existing land base just meets the 30 year requirement of residential development based on the 2006 Peace River Growth study that projected the population growing to 28,200 citizens. If future residential development occurs at higher than current densities and in more land-efficient manner, the town's existing residential land supply should last even longer. Citadel Park Area Structure Plan for example is on a 0.14 km^{2} (0.054 sq mi) parcel of land with a projection to accommodate 1600 persons, for a density of 11,510.80/km^{2} (29,812.8/sq mi). Due to the topographic constraints of the valley as well as the need to protect the natural areas and agricultural lands, the town is committed to optimize the existing developable land base as indicated in the 2010 Municipal Development Plan. Not only does higher density development lead to efficient use of available land and of existing infrastructure, but it also supports public transit.

==== Downtown revitalization ====
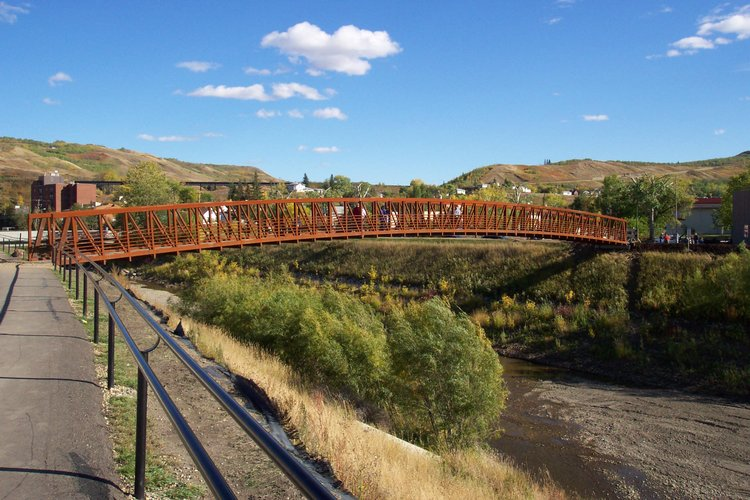
A foot bridge connecting the Riverfront District to South End.

In 2009, the town engaged Avi Friedman, an architect and professor at McGill School of Architecture on an ambitious downtown revitalization and tourism development master plan. It can be found at the town's website. The highlights of his design recommendations were:

- Redevelopment of the Riverfront District to include a marina, an upgraded Riverfront Park with lights and paving as well as high density residential development.
- Opening the south end of Main Street to the Heart River with a ramp up the earthen dyke and landscaping as well as the addition of an open air public art gallery to act as a counterpoint to the traffic circle on the north end of it.
- Opening up the west end of 96 Avenue to the river with terraced ramps and landscaping. A commercial/light industrial entity currently occupies parcel of land at the west end of 96 Ave.
- Creation of a heritage and welcoming park north of 100 Street between 94 Avenue and 96 Avenue adjacent to the Tourist Information Centre run by the Peace River & District Chamber of Commerce. Currently Linc Park occupies a small portion of these lands and is connected to Pat's Creek Trail and Friendship Trail.
- Densification of Main Street and the downtown in general with a minimum of 3 storey buildings as well as aesthetic additions to Main Street like large-scale awnings and street furniture.
- Upgrading the Twelve Foot Davis (baseball) Ball Park into a festival square equipped with better sitting and a stage. The baseball diamond currently hosts PeaceFest and Peace River Pow Wow. Peace River Aboriginal Inter-agency Committee made a formal request in June 2008 to erect a dance arbour for hosting traditional Aboriginal events.

==== Neighbourhoods ====
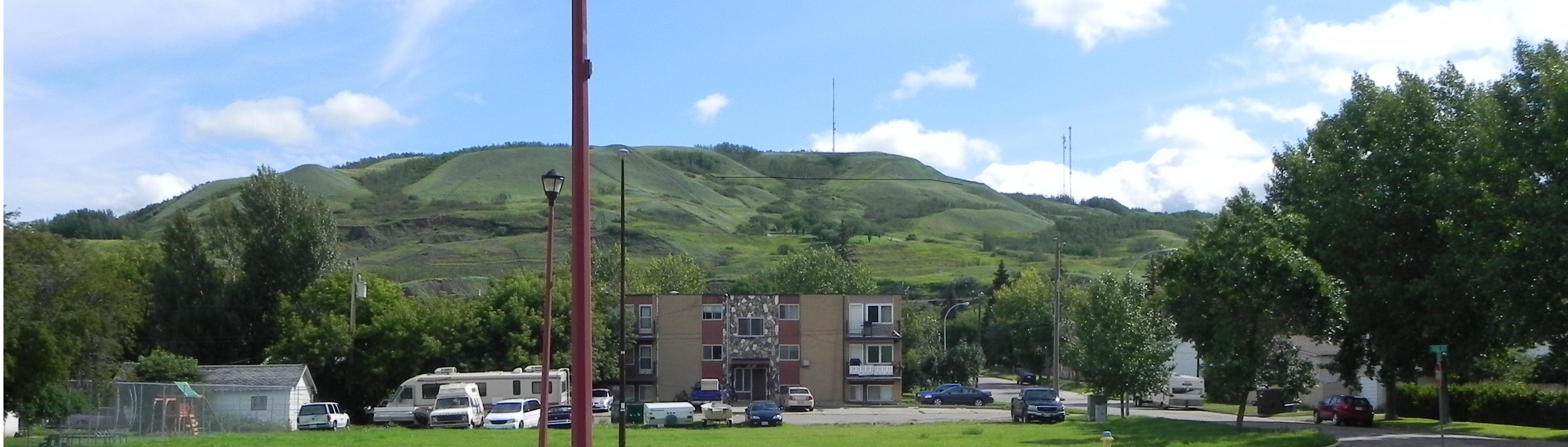
An apartment building in the South End of Peace River with Grouard Hill serving as a backdrop..

The Town of Peace River has various distinct neighbourhoods separated by geographic features of the area. The Downtown core is the civic business, administrative, social services and cultural centre of the town. It is split vaguely into three districts - the Commercial District, a Mixed Commercial/Residential District, and a Riverfront District.

The Commercial District is centred on the intersection of Main Street (100 Street), which forms part of Highway 744, and 100 Avenue. It spans from a block on either side of Main Street and along 100 Avenue. The Commercial District consists mostly of government, professional and commercial offices, financial institution, restaurants, cafés, retail stores and hotels.

The Riverfront District borders the Peace River and River Road between 94 Avenue to the north and 102 Avenue to the south adjacent to the Heart River bridge. It is home to restaurants, an enclosed shopping mall, an arts performance hall, a mini-golf facility, hotels, a museum, a convention centre, apartments, parks, trails and a boat launch.

The Mixed Commercial/Residential District makes the rest of the Downtown and consists of a mixture of low density and high density housing, government offices, professional and commercial offices, recreational facilities, hotels, bars, retail stores and restaurants.

Outside of Downtown core, the South End is the oldest neighbourhood in the town. It is located immediately south of the Downtown core, across the Heart River bridge, and west of Judah Hill. It is developed in a long and somewhat linear form parallel to the Peace River. The South End consists of mostly older single detached homes, a relatively small number of duplexes and apartments and various seniors' residences including a large seniors' apartment lodge immediately across the Heart River bridge on 103 Avenue, which is managed by the North Peace Housing Foundation. The South End stretches a far as 118 Avenue block after which the bank slopes become too unstable and has resulted in slides in past.

The North End is located north of the Highway 2 and west of Kaufman Hill, and is also developed in a linear form parallel to the Peace River. The North End is actually two neighbourhoods: Springfield and Norglen, which are seamlessly connected. The town's schools and most of its recreational facilities are located in the North End. In addition to single detached housing, the North End consists of the majority of the town's high density housing. The North End has a boat launch. Bewley Island, a sizable Crown owned island on the Peace River is also located on the North End of town.

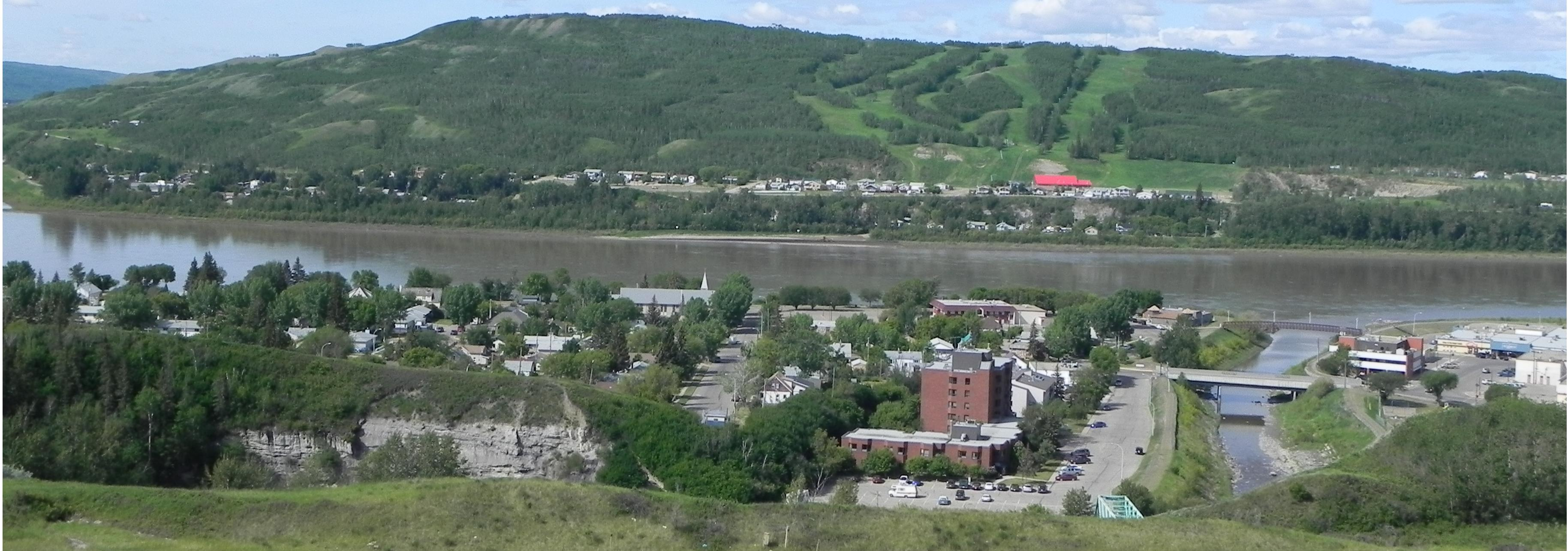
Peace River neighbourhoods: South End on the front left while Upper West Peace is at the foot of Misery mountain. Lower West Peace almost at river level.

West Peace lies southeast of the old Highway 2 alignment on the west shore of the Peace River. It includes two sub-neighbourhoods - Upper and Lower West Peace - that are divided by Shaftesbury Trail (Highway 684). Upper West Peace is on the west side of Highway 684 to the foot of the Misery Mountain Ski Hill. Lower West Peace is on the east side of Highway 684 and abuts Sisson Island, an 83 Acre privately owned island on the Peace River. Both Upper and Lower West Peace are predominantly developed with low density housing with some interspersed medium-density housing. Lower West Peace features a boat launch.

The Pines neighbourhood is located north of Upper and Lower West Peace, generally between the old and current Highway 2 alignments and more specifically across 100 Avenue from the Lions Camp Site. It was named for the numerous pine trees that grew in the area. The pine trees have since been chopped down after being ravaged by pine beetles. The Pines is single detached housing neighbourhood.

Rosedale is located to the south of Lower West Peace between Highway 684 and the Peace River. It consists of single detached housing with relatively larger lots on un-paved roads.

Shaftesbury Estates is further south of Rosedale separated by a short strip of undeveloped land and St. Germaine Creek along Highway 684 and abutting the Peace River. It is the town's most rapidly growing neighbourhood and consists of single detached housing.

Saddleback Ridge, or Saddleback, is atop the West Hill immediately behind Misery Mountain and south of Highway 2 behind an industrial area. Rolling Hills neighbourhood is often considered to be part of Saddleback, although it is separate neighbourhood of single detached housing with some duplexes and row housing. Saddleback consists mostly of single detached housing, and after a bylaw amendment allowed medium density housing and not high density residential.

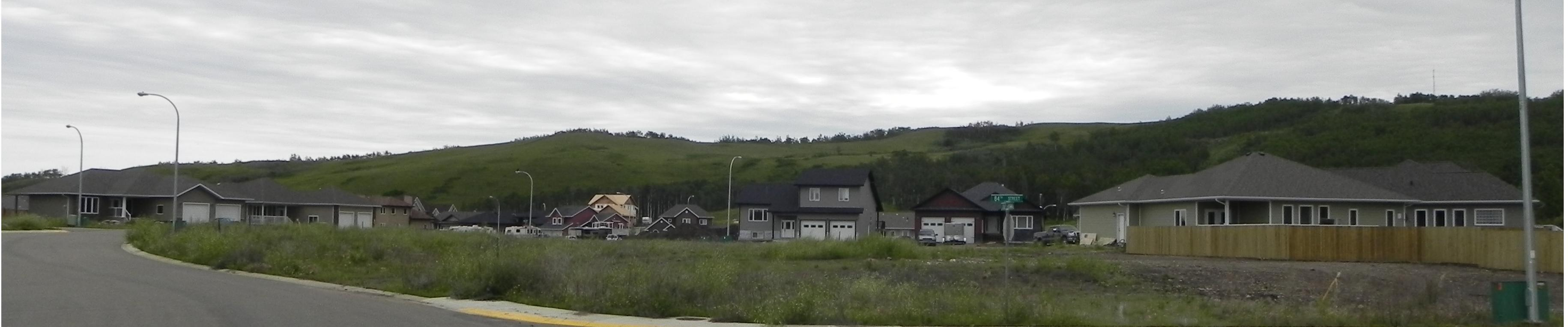
Saddleback Ridge neighbourhood at the foot of Misery Mountain

Westbrook Estates is approximately 1 kilometre south of Saddleback, west of 80 Street separated by a stretch of undeveloped wilderness with trails through which St. Germain Creek and one of its tributaries cut while flowing to the Peace River. It is flanked by Misery Mountain to the east and Brick Hill on the west side. It consists single detached housing on acreages and lacking in town sewer and potable piped water services.

West Hill Commercial District extends from 80 Street to 73 Street on either side of Highway 2. The District encompasses Freson Centre which is home to most of the big-box stores in Peace River, a veterinary clinic, hotels, coffee shops, fast food restaurants, car and holiday trailers dealerships and the Northern Lakes College Peace River Campus. The Peace River Community Health Centre is also located in the District, on 68 Street and south of Highway 2.

There are three trailer parks in the Town of Peace River: Cheviot Heights Trailer Park behind Freson Center on West Hill, Terrace Trailer Park adjacent to Bridgeview Industrial Park just across the bridge on the west side of the Peace River and Coolsprings Mobile Home Park at the foot of Kauffman Hill just outside the downtown.

Area structure plans containing new residential neighbourhoods were adopted in 2009 and 2010, including St. Germaine Creek on a recently annexed land northwest of the intersection of Highway 2 and Highway 743, and Citadel Park on land west of Highway 684 between the Pines and Upper West Peace. Future residential development is also planned in Westview on the lands adjacent to the Peace River Community Health Centre.

== Demographics ==
Federal census population history
Year	Pop.	±%
1916	742	—
1921	980	+32.1%
1926	582	−40.6%
1931	864	+48.5%
1936	883	+2.2%
1941	873	−1.1%
1946	997	+14.2%
1951	1,672	+67.7%
1956	2,034	+21.7%
1961	2,651	+30.3%
1966	4,087	+54.2%
1971	5,039	+23.3%
1976	4,840	−3.9%
1981	6,043	+24.9%
1986	6,355	+5.2%
1991	6,717	+5.7%
1996	6,536	−2.7%
2001	6,240	−4.5%
2006	6,315	+1.2%
2011	6,729	+6.6%
2016	6,842	+1.7%

In the 2021 Census of Population conducted by Statistics Canada, the Town of Peace River had a population of 6,619 living in 2,590 of its 2,997 total private dwellings, a change of −3.3% from its 2016 population of 6,842. With a land area of 25.34 km^{2} (9.78 sq mi), it had a population density of 261.2/km^{2} (676.5/sq mi) in 2021.

In the 2016 Census of Population conducted by Statistics Canada, the Town of Peace River recorded a population of 6,842 living in 2,601 of its 2,970 total private dwellings, a 1.7% change from its 2011 population of 6,729. With a land area of 26.26 km^{2} (10.14 sq mi), it had a population density of 260.5/km^{2} (674.8/sq mi) in 2016. 6.3% of the population identified as First Nations, while 11.0% identified as Métis.

According to the 2006 census, the median age was 32.2 years compared to Alberta's 36.0 years and Canada's 39.5 years. Also 7.4% of the population in Town of Peace River was under 5 years old according to the 2006 census. This is on the high side considering that in Alberta, it is 6.2% and 5.3% in Canada as a whole. The 2006 census also showed that 8.2% of population in the Town of Peace River were of retirement age of 65 and over compared with 10.7% in Alberta and 13.7% in Canada.

72.0% of the residents of the Town of Peace River identified themselves as Christians while 26.5% had no religious affiliation in the 2001 Census. Muslims and Sikhs made 0.4% while the remaining 0.7% was other religions outside the main ones listed. In the Christian population, 50.3% were Protestant while 44.4% were Catholic. Orthodox made up 1.2% of the Christians while smaller denominations made the rest.

Because of the traditional and historical significance of the area, and the proximity to various First Nation settlements communities, there is a strong Aboriginal cultural presence in the Town of Peace River. There is also a relatively higher Aboriginal population in the town at 14.2% compared with the province's 5.80% and 3.75% in the nation according to the 2006 Canadian Census. The Peace River Aboriginal Inter-agency Committee has been organizing the Peace River Pow Wow since the mid nineties. The Pow Wow is an event that celebrates the Aboriginal culture and traditional practices. Unlike most Pow Wows that are occur exclusively on First Nations territories, the Peace River Pow Wow is hosted at the Peace River Agricultural Fair Grounds in mid June.

In the 2006 Canadian Census, 6.50% of the residents of the Town of Peace River were native speakers of French only, higher than the 1.90% in the province and 3.95% in the Canadian population outside the province of Quebec. The town borders French Canadian communities to the south and the east. St. Isidore, a French Canadian community 15 kilometres to the east of the Town of Peace River hosts the St. Isidore Winter Carnival in mid February. The carnival is molded after the Quebec Winter Carnaval Festival.

== Economy ==
While the Government of Alberta is the largest employer in the town, with over 15 government departments located within its municipal boundaries, it is followed in close second by resource extraction, principally forestry, agriculture, oil and gas and their support services. Over the years, Peace River's economy has expanded to include professional services, manufacturing, health/social services and construction.

The Town of Peace River sits in the proximity of Peace River Oil Sands, Alberta's 3rd largest oil sands deposit. In May 2010, Penn West Energy Trust signed a $1.25-billion deal with China Investment Corporation to finance operations in the Peace River oil sands area in anticipation of significantly ramping up its production. As part of the deal, $817 million took 45% stake in the oil sands operations and $435 million took 5% equity stake in the trust itself. In January 2010, Shell submitted a regulatory application for an 80,000 barrel-per-day expansion.

The Peace River is the largest river in Alberta and yet has the least water allocation licenses. Only 0.2% of provincial water allocations and only 0.3% or 9.1 million cubic metres of all estimated water use in the province are in the Lower Peace Region, implying that less than 1% of the average annual flow is allocated or used. It is for this reason that large energy projects are being considered in the region. In March 2008, Bruce Power made an application with the Canadian Nuclear Safety Commission to build a 4 GW nuclear power plant in the area 30 kilometres west of the Town of Peace River around Lac Cardinal. After a detailed review of that site and other potential sites, Bruce Power Alberta, a subsidiary of Bruce Power announced that it has selected a different site approximately 30 kilometres north of the Town of Peace River. As of 12 December 2011 Bruce Power announced that it would no longer proceed with a nuclear power option in Alberta stating that: “We’ve decided the new nuclear option in Alberta is not something our company will be progressing further.”

== Arts and culture ==
=== Festivals and events ===
Some annual festivals and events in the Peace River area include the following:

- St. Isidore Carnival in February
- Alberta Pond Hockey tournament in February
- African Heritage Month events in February
- Peace River Film Festival in March
- Aboriginal Gathering & Pow Wow in June
- Paddle the Peace on Father's Day
- Peace River Heritage Run in June
- Peace River Gold Cup jet boat racing in July
- Peace Fest in July
- Tri-River Triathlon in August
- Annual Peace River Gay Pride

=== Libraries ===
As a member of The Regional Automated Consortium (TRAC), the Peace River Public Library provides patrons with access to over 2.9 million holdings throughout Alberta. In addition to books, videos, books on tape or CD, music CDs, several daily newspapers and reference material and information about Peace River, the Peace River Public Library carries some old environmental reports from area industries as well as a demonstration CANFLEX fuel bundle in the nuclear display from the time when Energy Alberta first proposed building a nuclear plant in the region.

Having grown out of space and aging, the Peace River Public Library is in the process of being upgraded and upsized. The preliminary design layout is located on the Town of Peace River's website. The new library building will include a cultural centre and an art gallery.

Alberta Law Society Libraries has a local library located at the Peace River Courthouse. There is also a toy library located at the Belle Centre.

Other libraries in the area include Nampa Municipal Library in Nampa, the Grimshaw Municipal Library in Grimshaw and Manning Municipal Library in Manning.

=== Film and theatre ===
There are two theatre companies in the area: the Peace Players based at Athabasca Hall in Peace River and the Lac Cardinal Regional Performing Arts Society who perform at the Grimshaw Community Theatre in nearby Grimshaw. The Peace Players has several productions every season from September to June, including a musical theatre, a children's production theatre, an evening of One Acts and dinner & theatre. The Lac Cardinal Regional Performing Arts Society also runs adult productions as well a children's production. The two companies work together sometimes in productions, especially the larger ones.

The Peace River Film Festival is in its second year and runs for two days in March at Athabasca Hall. Cinema 72 which is part of the Magic Lantern Theatres, national chain is a 2 auditorium theatre showing mostly commercial films. It is currently undergoing expansion to become a 4 auditorium theatre with the intent of running independent films several times a year in one of the auditoriums. Cinema Politica has a local chapter in Peace River and offers free/by-donation documentaries twice a month at the Ground Level Youth Centre in Peace River with the aim of initiating discussions and the exchange of ideas surrounding social, environmental, economic and cultural issues.

=== Music and visual arts ===
Peace River is home to a growing number of musicians including No Limitz and Jeff McCann, both of whom have performed all over Alberta and Canada. No Limitz plays host to Peace Region Music Industry Conference & Songwriters Workshop held in Peace River at the Belle Centre in early May. Also No Limitz's Sherry Crawford and Dana Blayone have organized a free Summer Concert series at the Riverfront Park in Peace River every last Thursday of the month in summer to feature Peace Region Musicians. The endeavor aims to encourage the growth of music in the area and is sponsored by both the Town of Peace River and Northern Sunrise County. Peace Players also host a number of concert series involving performers from across North America.

The North Peace Performing Arts Festival runs for almost two weeks in March. The festival is usually a step towards provincial and national competitions for students with the incentive to progress to higher levels. It is organized by the North Peace Performing Arts Festival Association.

PeaceFest is the Peace River region's biggest concert having grown from a small "We're Back ’97″ concert organized after the major flood in Peace River in spring of 1997. It occurs in July at the Twelve Foot Davis Ball Park, coinciding with the Peace River Gold Cup jet boat racing and a fair at the Riverfront Park that includes street performers and interactive rides. A free pancake breakfast is provided at the Peace Country Co-op store served by the Peace River area M.L.A. and the town mayor.

Peace River Art Club is a society made up of visual artists who are based in the Peace River area. The Peace River Art Club also has exhibitions at the Athabasca Hall art gallery in both stand alone basis and in concert with events at the Riverfront Park, as well as in the Peace River Municipal Library Gallery and the Peace River Museum.

=== Nightlife ===
In addition to the various nightclubs and pubs located within the Town of Peace River, blues, folk and jazz concerts, organized by the underground Music Society occur on the last Saturday during the months of September, October, January, February, March, April and May. The underground Music Society, which is a not-for-profit organization was established over eighteen years ago, host most of their performances at the Senior Citizens Drop-in Centre and is run entirely by volunteers.

In order to stem a rising trend in bars and nightclub violence, the Town of Peace River introduced the Drinking Establishments Licensing Bylaw in late 2008. The bylaw included the establishment providing first aid to patrons, cleaning up of the vicinity surrounding establishments and providing adequate outdoor lighting to prevent fights.

== Attractions ==
=== Museums ===
- Peace River Museum, Archives & Mackenzie Centre: Located 99th Street and 103rd Avenue, the museum contains over 10,000 artifacts and contains a fur trade gallery, aboriginal artifacts and the Peace River Gallery which documents the history of settlement in Peace River. The wheelshaft from the famous steamer D.A Thomas is located on the grounds.
- Lac Cardinal Pioneer Village Museum: Located near the entrance to Queen Elizabeth Provincial Park, this museum represents life in the 1920s and 1940s.

Other museums in the area include Nampa Museum in Nampa, Musée Girouxville in Girouxville, Brownvale Agricultural Museum in Brownvale and Battle River Pioneer Museum in the Town of Manning.

=== Park and trails ===
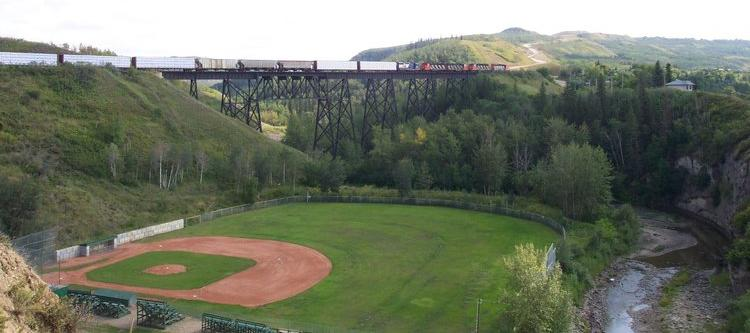
The 12 Foot Davis Ball Park in the Town of Peace River.

- Riverfront Park: Located south of Peace River's Downtown, Riverfront Park is equipped with picnic tables, a playground and a boat launch. A section of it designed with an amphitheatre-type topography facing a gazebo for hosting outdoor performances. The parks also features a giant wooden statue of Twelve Foot Davis. The lights hung on the trees at Riverfront Park are lighten up during Christmas period.
- Peace River Lions Club Park : Located on the west side of the Peace River across the bridge immediately south of Highway 2, Lions Club Park is equipped with campsites, sewage dumping station and trails.
- 12 Foot Davis Grave Site, Peace River Provincial Recreational Area and Dr. Greene Cairn Site: These sites are accessible from 100 Avenue and are located within the Greene Valley Provincial Park on Grouard Hill overlooking the Smoky, Peace, and Heart Rivers.
- Normand Boucher Community Aboretum: Located on 70 Avenue block on 98 Avenue, the arboretum holds 140 trees and 42 shrubs, 60 of which are different tree and plant species from across Alberta, Canada and the world. The arboretum also features a gazebo.
- Pat's Creek hiking trail: This is a 3 kilometre wilderness interpretive trail above the Pat's Creek just north of town starting at Highway 2/Highway 744 overpass between Kauffman Hill and George Hill and heading up to the Peace River Agricultural Society Grounds in Northern Sunrise County. It used to be the old Highway 2 route into town. Cross Country Skiing is also popular at this trail during the winter months.

Parks and recreational areas in close proximity to the Town of Peace River include Wilderness Park, Strong Creek Park, Tangent Park in the Peace River Wildland Provincial Park, Lac Cardinal Recreation Area, Queen Elizabeth Provincial Park, Figure Eight Lake Provincial Park and Leddy Lake Recreation Area. Other parks within 100 kilometers of the Town of Peace River include Haig Lake Recreation Area, Joker Lake, Winagami Lake Provincial Park, Sulphur Lake Provincial Recreation Area, Montagneuse Lake Recreation Area and Kimiwan Lake Birdwalk.

There is an extensive multi-use trail system for pedestrians and bicycles throughout the town including the dykes within the river valley that form part of the northern leg of the Trans Canada Trail. The trail runs from Calgary and heads north through Edmonton to the Peace River area through Grouard. Between Grimshaw and the Town of Peace River is the 29 kilometre Friendship Trail.

=== Recreation facilities ===
There are facilities and activities for all seasons of the year.

- Athabasca Hall: Located on 98 Avenue in Peace River, the Athabasca Hall was built in 1938 and is a historical fixture. It features a 244-seat hall and an art gallery and a dance studio in the basement.
- Golf World on The Peace: Located in south of Downtown adjacent to the mall, this is an 18 Hole wheelchair accessible mini-golf facility.
- Baytex Energy Centre: Opened in 1978 as the Kinsmen Arena, the facility can hold up to 1,900 people with the ice. The arena is home to several minor, recreational and old-timer hockey leagues. It is located on 73 Avenue.
- Peace Regional Pool: This pool opened in 1991. The pool has programs for learning to swim for various ages and it is on 98 Street.
- Water Play Park: Peace River has an outdoor water park for kids located next door to the tennis courts and a playground. It is open during the summer months of July and August.
- Misery Mountain skiing: Located on the West Hill of Peace River, Misery Mountain offers several runs for every level of skier. With large ski chalet, Misery Mountain offers individual or family equipment rentals of both skis and snowboards, ski pass rates, lessons and snow school.
- Golf courses in the Peace River area include the 9-hole Creek Golf Course, the 9-hole Heart River Golf Course, the 18-hole Mighty Peace Golf Course, and the 9-hole Peace View Golf Course.

=== Hunting and fishing ===
Wildlife in the Peace River region is very diverse and varied. Big game common in the area include moose, white-tailed deer, mule deer and elk, and attracts hunters from far and wide. There are dozens of outfitting companies in the area that cater to trophy hunters and back country adventure seekers. Migratory ducks and geese are hunted at nearby Lac Cardinal as well as surrounding grain fields. Black bears, coyotes and wolves are also hunted in the area as are grouse, and to small extent beavers and hares.

There is a wide variety of fishing opportunities in the region from the Peace River itself and its tributaries to the numerous lakes in the area, some of which are stocked and naturally aerated to prevent winter kill. The Peace River, especially at the confluence with the Smoky River in the Peace River Wildland Provincial Park has various fish species including Arctic Grayling, Bull Trout, Burbot, Northern Pike, Rainbow Trout and Walleye.

=== Tours and adventures ===
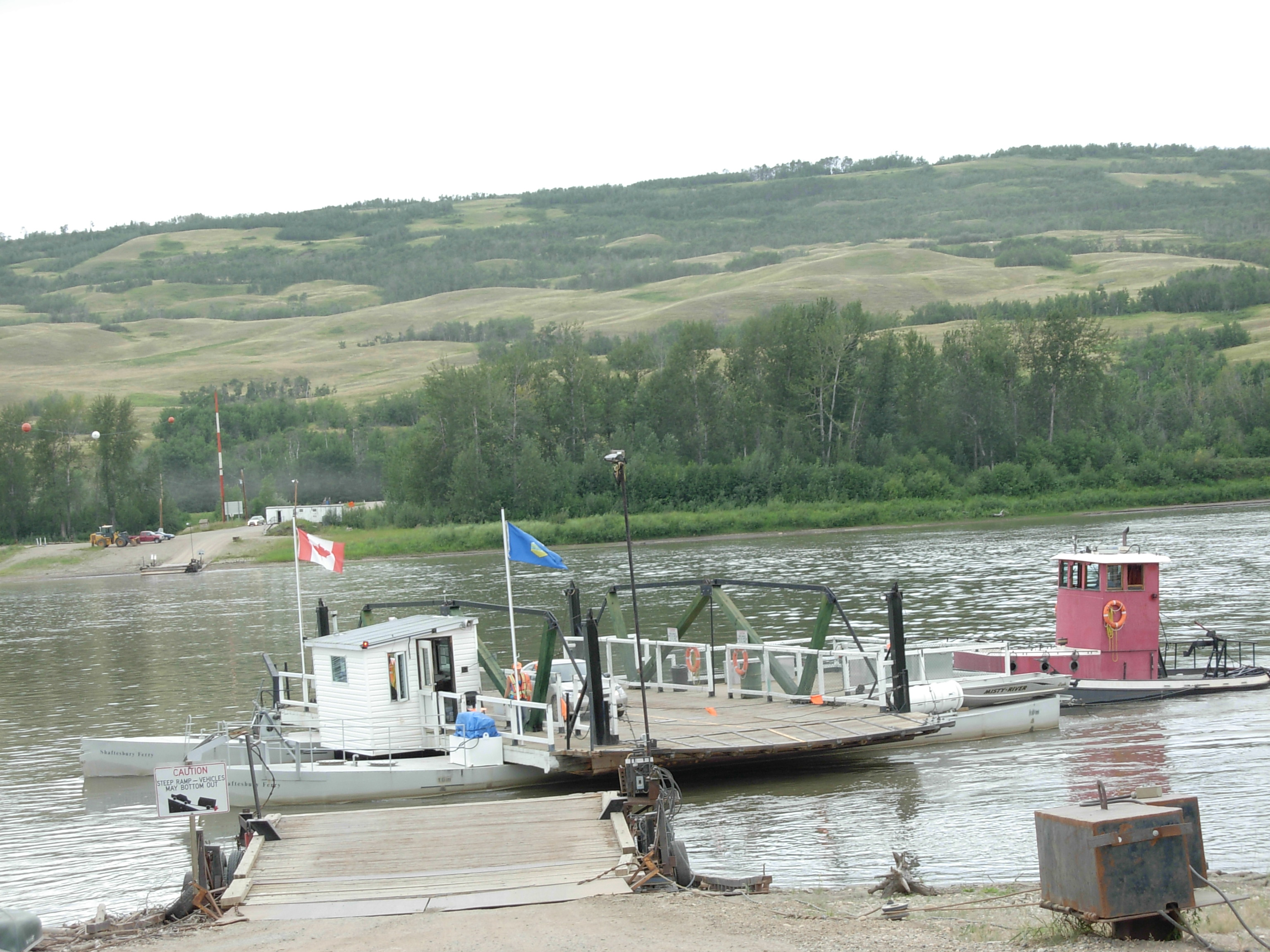
The Shaftesbury Ferry on the Peace River.

- Northbase Outdoor Ranch – an array of outdoor events for all ages: kid's camps, AEF certification courses, riding lessons in 5 different disciplines, day camps, horseback trail rides, as well as rental of canoe for the day or week to drift along the Peace River.
- Peace Valley Guest Ranch: includes a pleasure cruise of the Peace River on a river boat and a horse trail ride.
- Sandy Ridge Ranch & Stable
- Shaftesbury Ferry: The public can ride across the river on a working ferry, which is accessed at approximately 25 kilometre south of the Town of Peace River along Highway 740 (Shaftesbury Trail). The ferry operates during daylight hours (7 a.m. to 11 p.m.) and there is no charge to cross the river on it.

== Sports and recreation ==
The Peace River area has competitive sports in various disciplines including hockey, baseball, Tae Kwon Do, curling, soccer and boxing. Peace River Stampeders play in the North Peace Hockey League while Peace River Navigators play in Northwest Junior Hockey League. The Peace River Minor Hockey Association also provides hockey programs for the area's youth. The area has minor and senior leagues in baseball, fastball and slow pitch. There are numerous curling bonspiels held in the region during winter, including Oilmen's Bonspiels, Truckers & Operators Bonspiels, Women's Bonspiels, as well as a number of tournaments for a wide range of ages and skill levels. Combative sports of Tae Kwon Do and boxing are available on both competitive and recreation basis. North Peace Tae Kwon Do and Shamrock Boxing Club participate and host regional and provincial tournaments. The various golf courses in the Peace River area usually host numerous golf tournaments throughout summer and early fall.

Club	League	Sport	Venue	Established	Championships
North Peace Navigators	NWJHL	Ice Hockey	Baytex Energy Centre	2000	3

The higher profile competitive sports in area include the Alberta Pond Hockey Championships at Lac Cardinal for qualification to participate in World Pond Hockey Championships in Plaster Rock, New Brunswick and jet boat racing as part of the Whitewater Marathon Jetboat Racing circuit competing for Peace River Gold Cup. Alberta Triathlon Association sanctioned Tri-River Triathlon in Peace River is also competitive although recreational entrants participate too.

The Peace River's schools have done well in provincial swimming, volleyball, basketball, badminton and track and field competitions. Recently high school football has emerged as the area of strength. Peace River High School's Peace River Pioneers football team made it to the 2009 and 2010 Alberta Schools' Athletic Association (ASAA) Provincial Finals game where they lost to Brooks Buffalos, and the Cardston Cougars. The team has won four Mighty Peace Football League (MPFL) Peace Bowls (in 2005, 2008, 2009, and 2010), and one MPFL Athabasca Bowl Championship. The team currently holds the league record for consecutive regular season wins at 26 (ongoing). In the team's nine-year existence they have had six undefeated regular seasons.

The area is also filled with recreational leagues for a wide range of skills and ages. Most games or matches are held in the evenings and weekends, and include sports such as tennis, soccer, squash, volleyball, softball, curling, basketball, and ice hockey. Most are local but except ice hockey, which is both local and regional.

The Peace Country Fish & Game Association (PCFGA) owns and manages a 500-metre rifle range, with backstops at 400 metre, 300 metre, 200 metre, 150 metre and 100 metre as well a shotgun range with 2 clay pigeon shooting launchers and a small arms/pistol range. The gun range has a clubhouse that was built during the 2004 Alberta Winter Games in Peace River. PCFGA hosts a variety of both competitive and recreational events throughout summer including International Defensive Pistol Association and Black Powder Cartridge Rifle Silhouette.

Summer recreational activities include boating, tubing, hiking, biking, roller blading, quadding and photography. In the winter, tobogganing on the valley hills, snowmobiling, and both downhill and cross-country skiing are favourite activities at Misery Mountain, and nearby trails and parks. There is drop-in basketball at the Al Boomer Rec Centre in winter and at Peace High School in summer. At the end of the ski season, Misery Mountain plays host to Slush Cup. Here, skiers and boarders try to make their way across an icy quickly melting hill side pond.

== Government ==
=== Municipal government ===
The town is governed by the seven member Town of Peace River Council consisting of a mayor and six councillors. The mayor is elected separately from the six town councillors, all for four-year terms.

The administrative head of the town is the Chief Administrative Officer (CAO) who not only acts as the policy adviser to the council, but also directs the overall planning, budgeting, management and evaluation of the municipal operations in accordance with the Municipal Government Act, the bylaws of the municipality, and the objectives, policies and programs approved by the council. The CAO for the Town of Peace River is Christopher J. Parker.

The Town of Peace River has a number of boards and committees. While some provide recommendations for town council decision, others have authority to make decisions. Boards and committees providing direction and recommendations to the town council include the Community Services Board, Fire Protection Steering Committee, the Peace River Museum Board, and Off Highway Vehicle Advisory Committee. The Peace River Municipal Library Board, Peace River Airport Review Committee, and the Municipal Planning Commission on the other hand, are decision making boards and committees.

=== Provincial and federal representation ===
The Town of Peace River is part of provincial riding of Peace River that is represented by one Member of Legislative Assembly. In the 2008 provincial election, the Progressive Conservative Party successfully retained the seat they have held since 1971 when Al Adair ran as a candidate for the party. Frank Oberle Jr. who is the representative of the constituency is also the Solicitor General and Public Security Minister.

From 1925 to 2015, the town was located within the federal riding of Peace River, represented by one Member of Parliament. After winning the seat in the 2004 federal election with Charlie Penson, the Conservative Party retained the seat in the next two elections, in 2006 and 2008, with Chris Warkentin being the flag bearer. The expansive riding of 138,009 persons had an electoral quotient of 138,009 which is significantly higher than the provincial average of 117,513 and national average of 102,639. For the 2015 federal election, Peace River became part of the newly created riding of Peace River—Westlock.

=== Policing and crime ===
Police protection in the Town of Peace River is provided by the Peace River Royal Canadian Mounted Police Detachment. The detachment is part of the Peace Regional RCMP Detachment that operates as an integrated detachment and provides services to Peace River, Grimshaw and the surrounding rural communities including the residents of Woodland Cree First Nation and the Lubicon Lake Indian Nation. The Peace River RCMP Detachment includes nine officers, which also includes highway patrol, collision analysis, general investigation services, police dog handling, forensic identification, and radio workshop units, providing support services to the detachment and that of the outlying detachments in Northern Alberta.

The Peace River RCMP Detachment also supports the following organizations and programs:

- Victim Services Unit
- Crime Stoppers
- Auxiliary Constable Program
- Youth Justice Committee
- Law Enforcement Torch Run
- Peace River Anti-Bullying Committee

For the 2006 post-censal populations of the 6,462 in the Town of Peace River and the nine-officer force, the town had the equivalent of 139 police officers per 100,000 population. By comparison, in the same year of 2007 the provincial rate was 165 police officers per capita and the national rate was 195. Between May 2007 and May 2008 the number of Criminal Code crimes that were recorded by the Peace Regional RCMP Detachment was 232 while between May 2008 and May 2009 the number was 231. In the May 2008 report, 140 were in the Town of Peace River while in the May 2009 was 134. These figures project to an average of 2169 crimes per 100,000 in the Town of Peace River and 1540 crimes per 100,000 in the entire region including Grimshaw, whose population exceeded 15,000 persons in 2006. This is compared to just below 10,000 crimes per 100,000 persons in Alberta and 7,000 crimes per 100,000 persons nationally.

Perhaps the most violent crimes in the area has seen in recent times is the swarming assault of two RCMP officers in Cadotte Lake, a hamlet about 90 kilometres northeast of Peace River in March 2010. With back-up from RCMP in Peace River, Red Earth Creek and High Prairie, the offenders were apprehended and charged.

== Infrastructure ==
=== Transportation ===
The Town of Peace River is located on Highway 2 to southern Alberta and near Highways 35 to Northwest Territories, and Highway 43 to British Columbia and Alaska thereby making it an important ground link to these destinations. These highways also provide access to the rich oil and gas fields and forests.

What was formerly the Northern Alberta Railway tracks through the town provide the only rail crossing over the Peace River in Alberta. The Canadian government built the Great Slave Lake Railway which started at Roma, a few kilometres west of the Town of Peace River on the Northern Alberta Railways and ran north to the southern shores of Great Slave Lake at Hay River, Northwest Territories. It is Canada's most northern railroad. The federal government's intent was to ease shipment of lead-zinc ore from the Pine Point Mines southwest of the lake. Currently Canadian National Railway owns and operates the line.

==== Road network ====
The road system in Peace River is on a grid where roads are numbered with avenues run east to west and streets run north to south. Postfix letter "A" is added to the name numbers of street that do not conform to the grid, lying between two streets that conform. With 100 Avenue and 100 Street located in the downtown core, the avenue numbers increase southwards and street numbers decrease eastwards. Some roads still bear the historical street names assigned in the pioneering days, in addition to the modern road numbering nomenclature, especially in the downtown area.

==== Airport ====
The town owns and manages a municipal airport, the Peace River Airport (IATA: YPE, ICAO: CYPE) located 5 kilometre west on Highway 2. Northern Air has regular flights from it to and from Edmonton International Airport Monday through Friday. They also charter flights from Peace River Airport as well as air ambulance. Peace Air once headquartered at the airport ceased operations in 2007.

The Peace River Airport Steering Committee has been set up to assess viability and regionalization potential the airport. The committee has representatives from the Town of Peace River, Northern Sunrise County, M.D. of Peace No. 135, County of Northern Lights and the Town of Grimshaw, and is working on a business plan.

==== Public transit ====
The town's Community Services Department managed the Peace River Transit, a small bus network operated by the Bus Company. The 2006 Census indicated that 1.4% of people in the Peace River used public transit to go to work, while 7.3% chose to walk or bike to work (the provincial averages are 9.2% and 7.1% respectively). According to the Peace River Transit Pilot Project Survey, 38% of the lower income earners used Peace River Transit. Statistics from Community Services Department indicated that the ridership had been on a steady climb since its inception in 2005. By June 2010, the number of rides provided for that month was almost 80% of the total rides provided in the entire year of 2005. Because the transit buses were not wheelchair accessible, special taxi passes were also made available at a discounted rate to seniors, mentally/physically challenged persons, low income individuals/families and students at Northern Lakes College through the Community Services Department. Peace River's transit system was discontinued in early 2011, due in part to high operating costs. However, the taxi pass program is still available to eligible individuals.

Among the bigger challenges facing the town (and other small towns) with respect to mass transit is the low overall population density and dispersed development that results in a pattern of travel that is less focused on the downtown and hence more difficult to serve by transit. Studies show that for every 1% increase in residential density, there is a 0.22% rise in transit ridership. However, destination density, such as clustered employment locations, tend to have a larger impact on transit ridership than residential density alone.

=== Utilities ===
The Town of Peace River extracts water from the Peace River at the Shaftesbury Water Treatment Plant. The treatment process involves clarification, sedimentation, filtration, chlorination and fluoridation. The potable water is then pumped to the three reservoirs the town owns. Sanitary waste is piped to the wastewater treatment plant in the north end of town that involves secondary treatment and extended aeration. Residential garbage pickup is contracted out to Allen Bros. Trucking Ltd., a private company.

The Town of Peace River provides municipal sanitary sewer and treated potable water against a unique set of topographical and climatic conditions. There is a significant annual variation in temperature compounded by dramatic changes in elevation within town that leads to frequent leaks and breaks in water mains and sewer trunks. The dramatic changes in elevation also necessitate a large number of lift stations to pump both treated drinking water and sewage across large distances. When combined with the maintenance issues associated with the unstable soils, these factors lead to very high infrastructure costs for urban development within the valley.

=== Health care ===
The Peace River area is served by the Peace River Community Health Centre, which is a site for Rural Alberta North & Rural Family Medical Training Program for University of Alberta. Other hospitals in the area include the Grimshaw/Berwyn Community Health Complex in Grimshaw, the Manning Community Health Centre in Manning and the Sacred Heart Community Health Centre in McLennan. Peace River Mental Health Clinic in downtown Peace River provides psychiatric care for patients in the region. When very specialized care is required, patients are often transferred to Edmonton via air ambulance. Initially these hospitals were run by the Peace Country Health Services. They are now administered by Alberta Health Services, the provincial health authority since a reorganization in 2008, that plans and delivers health services on behalf of the Ministry of Health.

Drop-in health needs are catered for at the Associate Medical Clinic in downtown Peace River. The clinic is working on plans for a new state-of-the-art medical clinic, Centre of Medical Excellence to be located adjacent to the Peace River Community Health Centre in West Hill. The over 42,000-square-foot (3,900 m^{2}) facility is intended to increase both the capacity and the efficiency of medical care in the region. Conceptual plans are located at Associate Medical Clinic website.

There is a handful of pharmacies, dental offices, chiropractic clinics and optometrists in town.

== Education ==
Both public and separate schools are available within the Town of Peace River. The Peace River School Division operates eighteen public schools and two outreach campuses in the area. Peace River based schools are Springfield Elementary School, T.A. Norris Middle School, Peace River High School and Outreach Campus. The Holy Family Catholic Regional Division provides elementary to Grade 12 Catholic education programming Peace River schools: Good Shepherd School and Glenmary Catholic Junior/Senior High School. The Conseil scolaire du Nord-Ouest No. 1 is a francophone education region offering Catholic and Public education to Section 23 children. They operate École des Quatre-Vents, a public school in Peace River. Peace River Adventist Junior Academy is another separate school in town.

Post-secondary education is offered at Northern Lakes College Peace River Campus. The college has recently expanded the program selection to include trades training in carpentry, electrical, welding and crane and hoisting equipment operator. The Peace River Campus also hosts NAIT administered Boreal Research Institute, a partnership of the private sector, the education system, and the community.

Peace Adult Literacy runs a volunteer adult literacy program. They located in the Horizon Learning Centre in the new Horizon Credit Union Office on Main Street.

== Media ==
The region is served by two weekly newspapers, the Peace River Record-Gazette and Mile Zero News. The Peace River Record-Gazette is based in Peace River while Mile Zero News is based in Grimshaw. Although the Record-Gazette reports mostly on the Town of Peace River, Nampa, St. Isidore and Northern Sunrise County and the Mile Zero News reports mostly on Grimshaw, the M.D. of Peace No. 135 and the County of Northern Lights, there is significant overlap in the news coverage by the two newspapers.

The Town of Peace River has two locally based radio stations: CKKX-FM (Kix FM) and CKYL-FM (River Country), both owned by Peace River Broadcasting. Other radio stations available in the area include CIAM-FM, CHFA-FM, CBX, CKUA and CFGP-FM.

== Notable people ==
- Wade Campbell
- Chrystia Freeland
- Linden Gaydosh
- Jillian Harris
- Kelly Kisio
- Melina Laboucan-Massimo
- Ken Lovsin
- Robin Lund
- Darren Kramer
- Chris Osgood
- Alex Ritson
- Brian Skrudland
- Aaron James Sorensen
- Fred Sutherland
- Cameron Whitcomb
- Nigel Whitmey

== Photo gallery ==
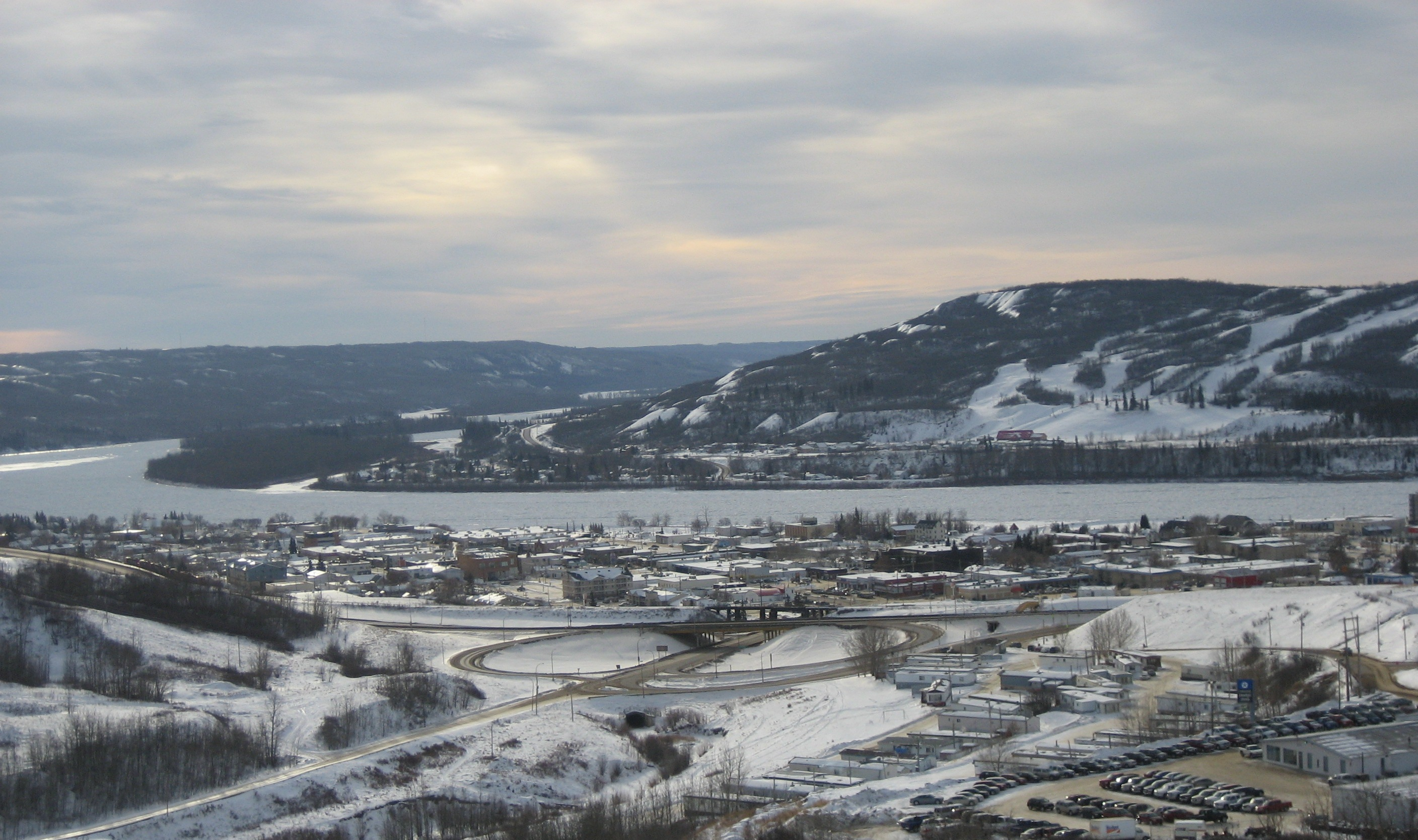
Peace River in winter

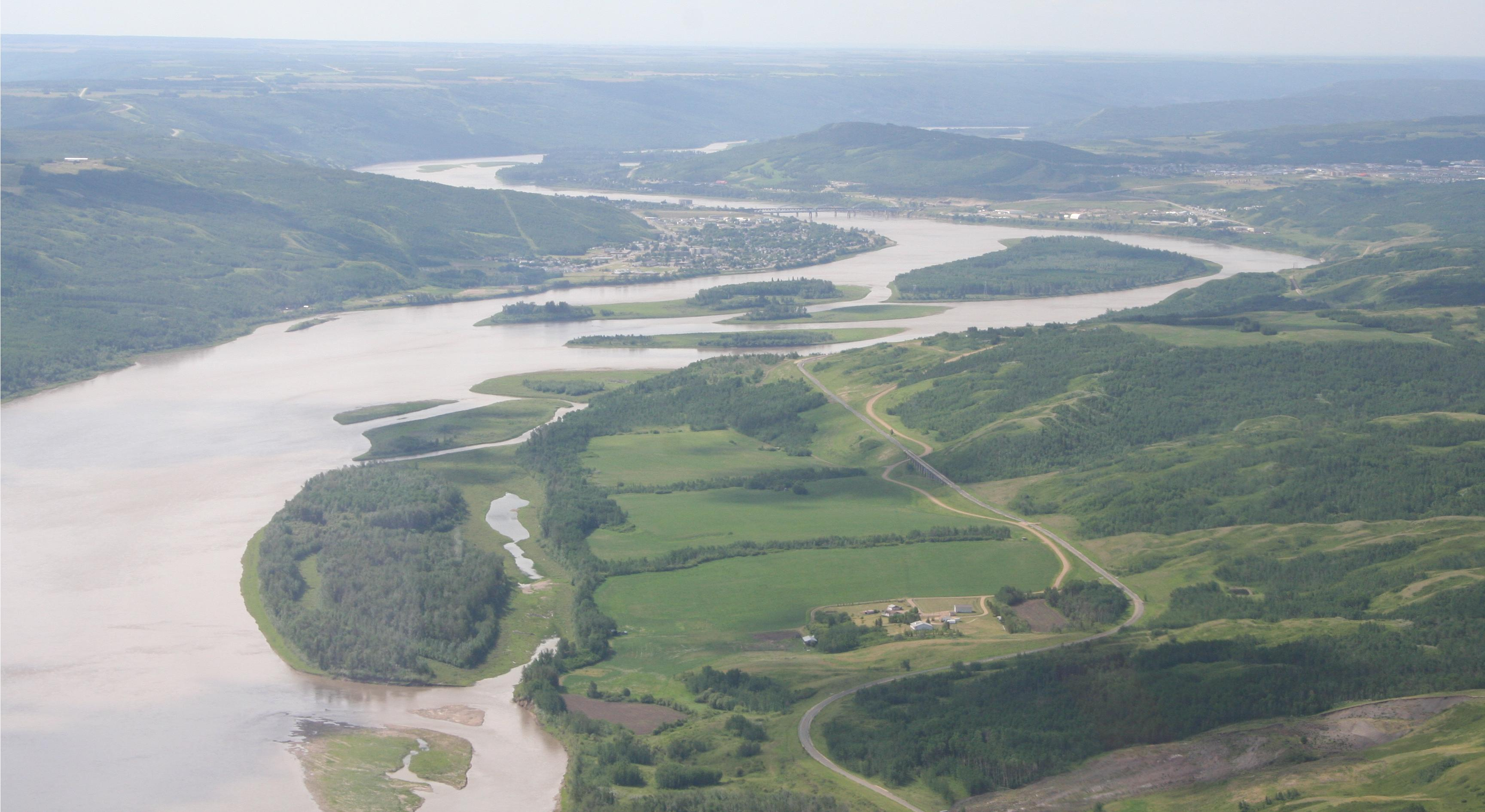
Aerial view of the Town of Peace River

== See also ==
- List of communities in Alberta
- List of francophone communities in Alberta
- List of towns in Alberta
