= St. Isidore, Alberta =

St. Isidore
- Hamlet
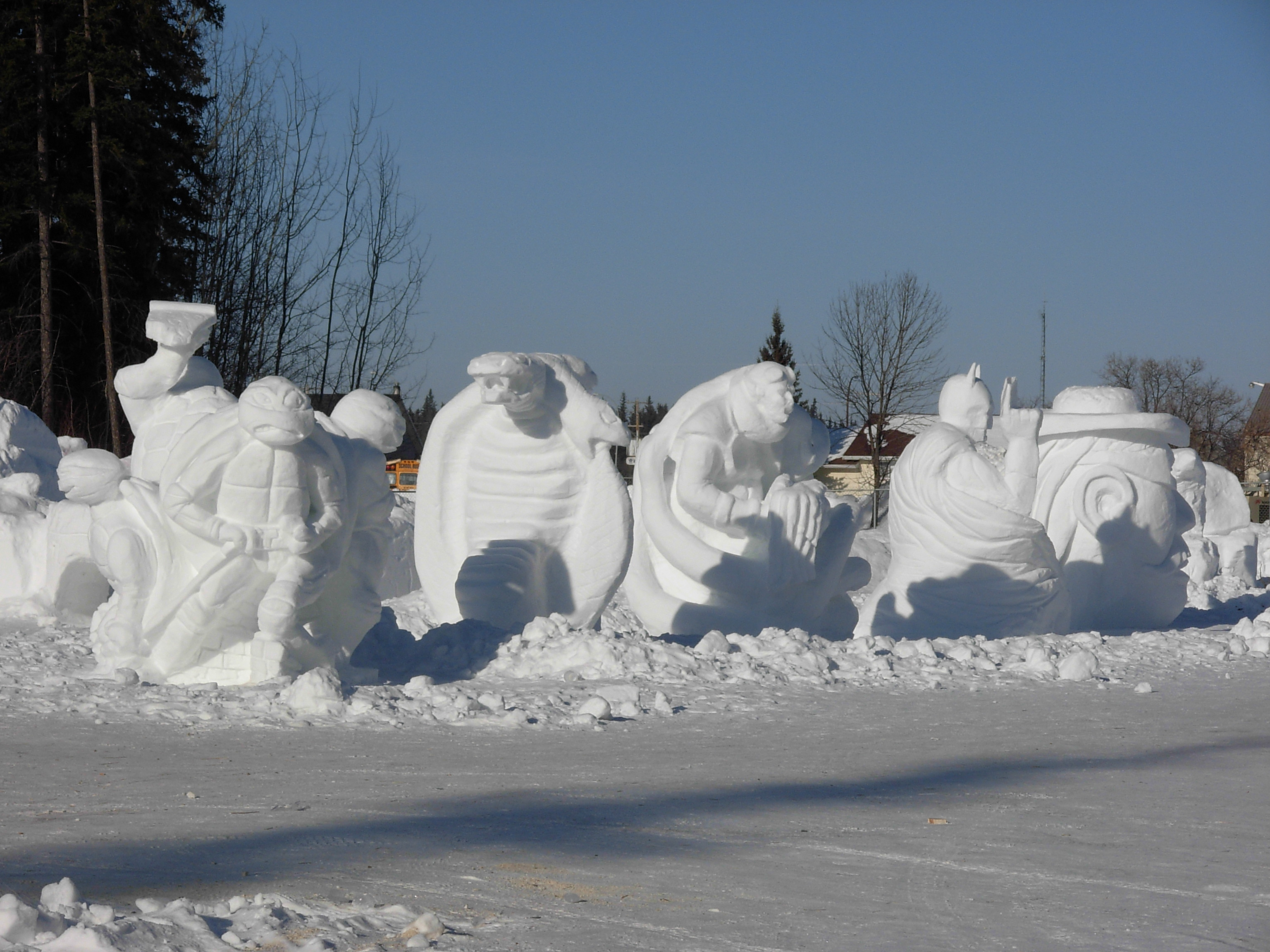
- St. Isidore Carnaval Super Z’héros in 2009

- Location of St. Isidore in Alberta
- Coordinates: 56.2047°N 117.1067°W
- Country: Canada
- Province: Alberta
- Census division: No. 19
- Municipal district: Northern Sunrise County
- Founded: 1953

Government
  - Type: Unincorporated
  - Governing body: Northern Sunrise County Council
  - Ward 4 Councillor: Evens Lavoie

Area (2021)
  - Land: 1.08 km^{2} (0.42 sq mi)

Population (2021)
  - Total: 236
  - Density: 218.9/km^{2} (567/sq mi)
- Time zone: UTC−06:00 (Alberta Time)
- Postal code: T0H

St. Isidore is a hamlet in northwest Alberta, Canada within Northern Sunrise County. It is located approximately 16 kilometres (9.9 mi) east of the Town of Peace River on Range Road 204 off Highway 688. St. Isidore is flanked by deep ravines cut by Pat's Creek to the north and Pat's Creek tributary to the south. The ravines are surrounded by pine forests.

In 2007, the St. Isidore Development Committee organized the St. Isidore Cultural Marketing Project that involved a lot reservation draw. There were eight applicants for the sixteen lots that were made available in the southeast end of the community.

== History ==
The Hamlet of St. Isidore is named after St. Isidore, a patron saint of farm workers who was known to be a model worker. It was founded in 1953 by seven families from the Saguenay-Lac-Saint-Jean region of Quebec. The group was aided by the Union des Cultivateurs Catholiques (Group of Catholic Farmers) of Saguenay-Lac-Saint-Jean Quebec, a rural agricultural organization that promoted a cooperative approach to agriculture and rural living. Being the last community to be settled in a wave of migration from Quebec after the Second World War, it has managed to maintain much of its original cultural vibrancy. Over half a century later, the community still reflects the cultural, cooperative, and family spirit at the heart of this community.

== Demographics ==
Population history of St. Isidore
Year	Pop.	±%
1976	51	—
1981	55	+7.8%
1986	90	+63.6%
1991	180	+100.0%
1996	183	+1.7%
2001	162	−11.5%
2006	211	+30.2%
2011	218	+3.3%
2016	266	+22.0%
2021	236	−11.3%
Source: Statistics Canada

In the 2021 Census of Population conducted by Statistics Canada, St Isidore had a population of 236 living in 87 of its 99 total private dwellings, a change of −11.3% from its 2016 population of 266. With a land area of 1.08 km^{2} (0.42 sq mi), it had a population density of 218.5/km^{2} (566.0/sq mi) in 2021.

As a designated place in the 2016 Census of Population conducted by Statistics Canada, St Isidore had a population of 266 living in 94 of its 97 total private dwellings, a change of 22% from its 2011 population of 218. With a land area of 1.09 km^{2} (0.42 sq mi), it had a population density of 244.0/km^{2} (632.1/sq mi) in 2016.

== Culture ==
During the third weekend of February each year, the hamlet hosts the Carnaval de St. Isidore in and around the St. Isidore Cultural Centre. Modeled after the Quebec Winter Carnival, this event celebrates the community's French-Canadian heritage through a variety of events while retaining the Albertan nature of the surrounding French communities. Among the major events is the snow sculpting competition in which the organizers, the St. Isidore Cultural Centre, sets a theme for the sculpting. Some themes over the years include Asterix & Obelix, Super Z’héros, Tropical, Orange, Western, and Vegas for the 30th edition in 2012. In addition to the professional category, the snow sculpting event also includes amateur and youth categories.

The Carnaval also features a mixture of traditional French folk and contemporary music, local talent, traditional French cooking, sleigh rides, log sawing, and other Franco-Canadian activities.

Carnaval de St. Isidore crowns the "ducs et duchesses" (its teenaged volunteers) King and Queen of the Carnaval. The volunteers are required to sell tickets in order to be entered into a draw that crowns the King and Queen.

== Amenities ==
St. Isidore offers a number of services to residents and tourists, including: the St. Isidore Co-op, a library, le Conseil Scolaire du Nord-Ouest, St. Isidore Housing Cooperative, le Domaine des aînés (seniors residence), la Société des Compagnons, le Club du Bon Temps, le Club Barbar, the Weavers' Guild, a cultural centre, dance troupe Plein Soleil, St. Isidore Museum, Family Community Support Services, a summer camp, a skating rink, and a Catholic church.

The roads in St. Isidore are both numbered and named, with avenues running east–west and streets (rues) running north–south.

== Economy ==
The economy of St. Isidore is predominantly agricultural in nature. Entreprises Macay is a family farming business that runs a Timothy hay drying and processing operation for export to Asian markets. There are beekeeping operations as well as dairy farming, both of which employ mostly seasonal workers. Residents of the hamlet also work in the nearby DMI Peace River Pulp Mill, Shell Peace River Complex, and the Town of Peace River.

== See also ==
- List of communities in Alberta
- List of designated places in Alberta
- List of hamlets in Alberta
