= Nanpa =

Japanese social phenomenon

Nanpa (ナンパ), also transliterated as nampa, in Japanese culture is a type of flirting and seduction popular among teenagers and people in their twenties and thirties.

When Japanese women pursue men in a fashion similar to nanpa, it is called gyakunan (逆ナン).

== Etymology ==
Nanpa was a new word of the Meiji era with the opposite word kōha. It was originally rendered in kanji as 軟派 (lit. "the soft school"). The meaning of nanpa was continually changing and different from what it means today. Initially, it referred to a political term with the meaning of "parties with soft opinion and proposition" or "people who are unable to claim a strong opinion" (1892), then it referred to "departments or reporters who are responsible for the articles of glossy things like social or literary in newspapers and magazines" (1901), eventually it meant "a faction of the youth who are enjoying pursuit of the opposite sex and fine clothing" (1909). In general, it means people interested more in fun and self-indulgence than in "hard" pursuits like politics, academia, or athletics. In contemporary Japanese culture, nanpa most often refers to "girl hunting" and there is a strong negative connotation associated with it.

The word for boyfriend hunting by women, gyakunan, derives from gyaku (逆; lit. "reverse"), and the first part of the word nanpa.

== Description ==
Nanpa is seen most often in young men ranging from their late teens to mid-twenties. Groups of "nanpa boys" will gather around places with busy, predominantly female foot traffic (bridges, subway stations, shopping malls, etc.) and approach women in search of a date.

Due to the increasing number of nanpa boys and rising complaints, many Japanese regions are reacting more harshly to them. For example, many places young people hang out, such as arcades are posting "No Nanpa" signs, and police in highly populated Japanese cities have been enforcing these rules. This may be in reaction to a growing fear in young Japanese women of abduction or rape. The Shibuya district is particularly strict on nanpa boys in the wake of the abduction of four girls by a middle aged man in July 2003.

== Same-sex nanpa ==
Japan also has a same-sex nanpa culture, especially within the gay entertainment district of Shinjuku ni-chome.

== See also ==
- Pickup artist
- Dōtonbori: Ebisubashi
- Dōkyūsei
- Group dating in Japan
