= Charlie Lake =

Charlie Lake may refer to:

- Charlie Lake, British Columbia, a settlement in British Columbia, Canada
- Charlie Lake (British Columbia), a lake in north-eastern British Columbia, Canada
- The Charlie Lake Formation, a Geological formation

== See also ==
- Charles Lakes (born 1964), an American gymnast
- Lake Charles (disambiguation)
