= Beatton River Provincial Park =

Provincial park in British Columbia, Canada

- IUCN category II (national park)
- Location within British Columbia
- Interactive map of Beatton River Provincial Park
- Location: Peace River Land District, British Columbia, Canada
- Nearest city: Fort St. John, BC
- Coordinates: 56°06′02″N 120°22′53″W
- Area: 185 ha (460 acres)
- Established: June 29, 2000
- Governing body: BC Parks

Beatton River Provincial Park is a provincial park in the Peace River Country of northeastern British Columbia, Canada.

== See also ==
- Beatton Provincial Park
- Beatton River
