= Pris =

Pris or PRIS may refer to:

- Pris (band), a side project of American musician Burke Thomas
- Peace Region Internet Society, in Canada
- Power Rangers in Space, an American television series
- Propofol infusion syndrome
- Pris Stratton, a character in Philip K. Dick's novel Do Androids Dream of Electric Sheep?
  - Pris Stratton, a character in the film Blade Runner played by Daryl Hannah
- Power Reactor Information System, an online database maintained by the International Atomic Energy Agency

== See also ==
- PRI (disambiguation)
