= Beatton Provincial Park =

Canadian provincial park

- IUCN category II (national park)
- Location within British Columbia
- Interactive map of Beatton Provincial Park
- Location: Peace River Land District, British Columbia, Canada
- Nearest city: Fort St. John, British Columbia
- Coordinates: 56°19′39″N 120°56′39″W
- Area: 320 ha (3.2 km^{2}; 1.2 mi^{2})
- Established: September 14, 1934
- Governing body: BC Parks
- Website: bcparks.ca/beatton-park/

Beatton Provincial Park is a provincial park in the Peace River Country of northeastern British Columbia, Canada. It is located on the Eastern shores of Charlie Lake approximately sixteen kilometres (9.9 mi) from Fort St John, British Columbia. The 320-hectare (790-acre) provincial park offers facilities that include vehicle accessible camping, boat launch, drinking water, picnic area, pit toilets, playground and a large trail system. The provincial campground only operates between May and September, but the park trail system is open year-round. The park's large trail network is maintained by the Whiskey Jack Nordic Ski Club and is used for cross-country skiing and snowshoeing in the winter and hiking in the summer. There are over 20 km (12 mi) of groomed cross-country ski trails designed for beginner, intermediate and advanced skiers and a toboggan hill located near the parking at the main gate.

== See also ==
- Beatton River Provincial Park

== Gallery ==
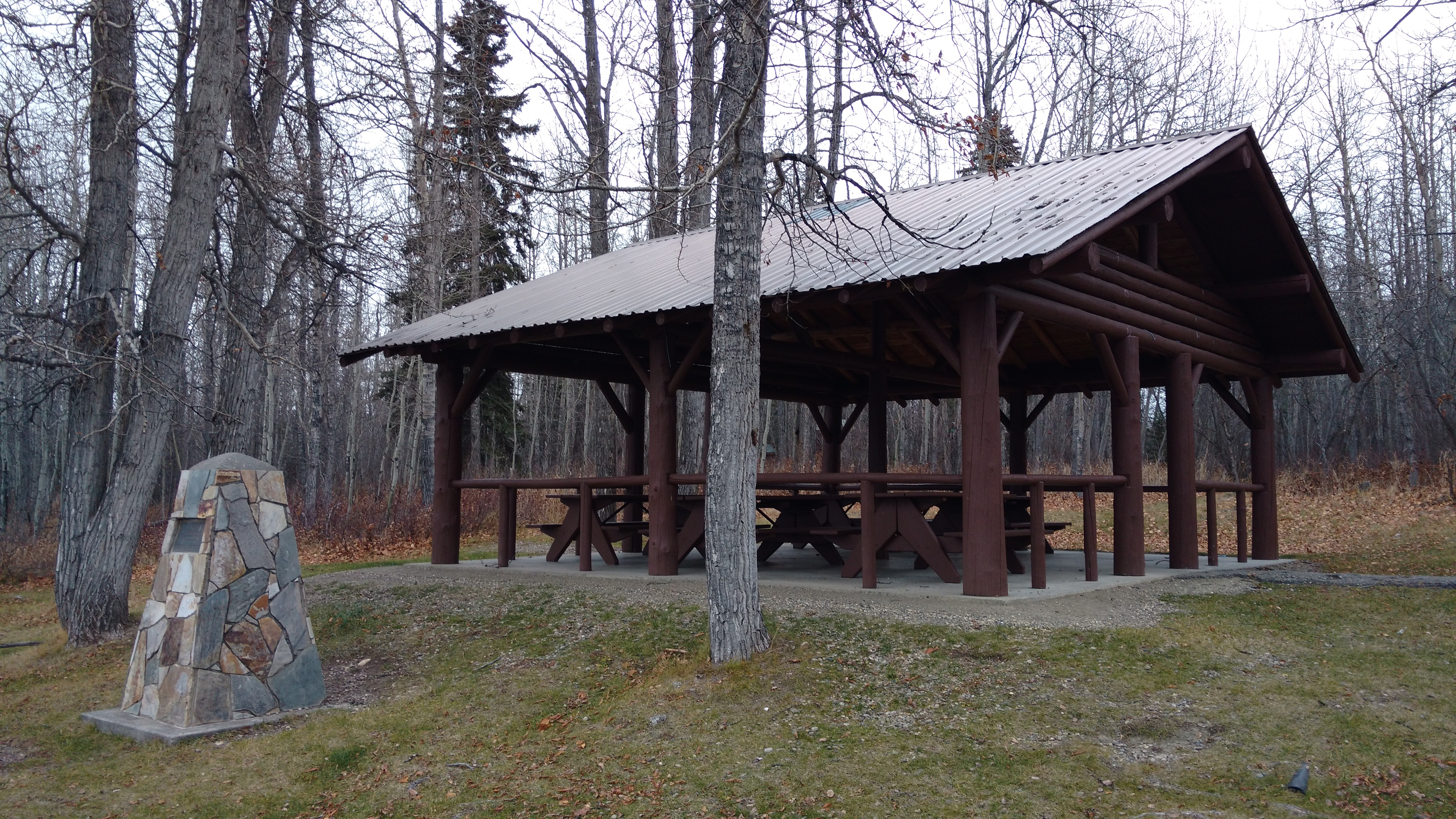
Beatton Provincial Park picnic shelter
