= List of indoor speed skating rinks =

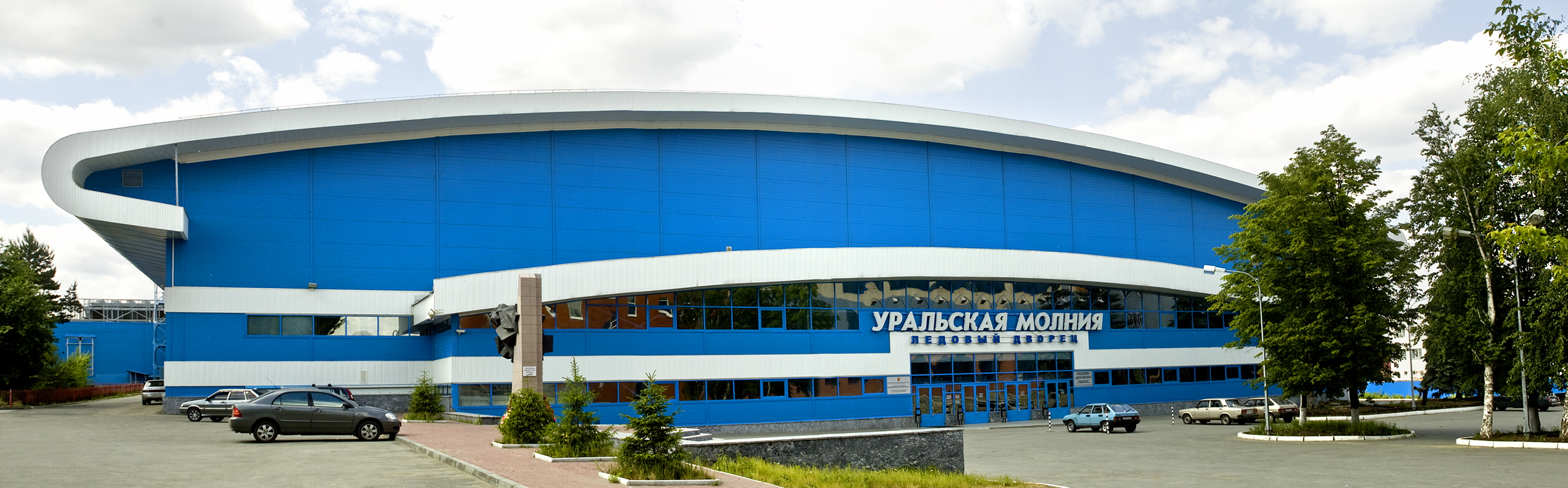
Uralskaya Molniya

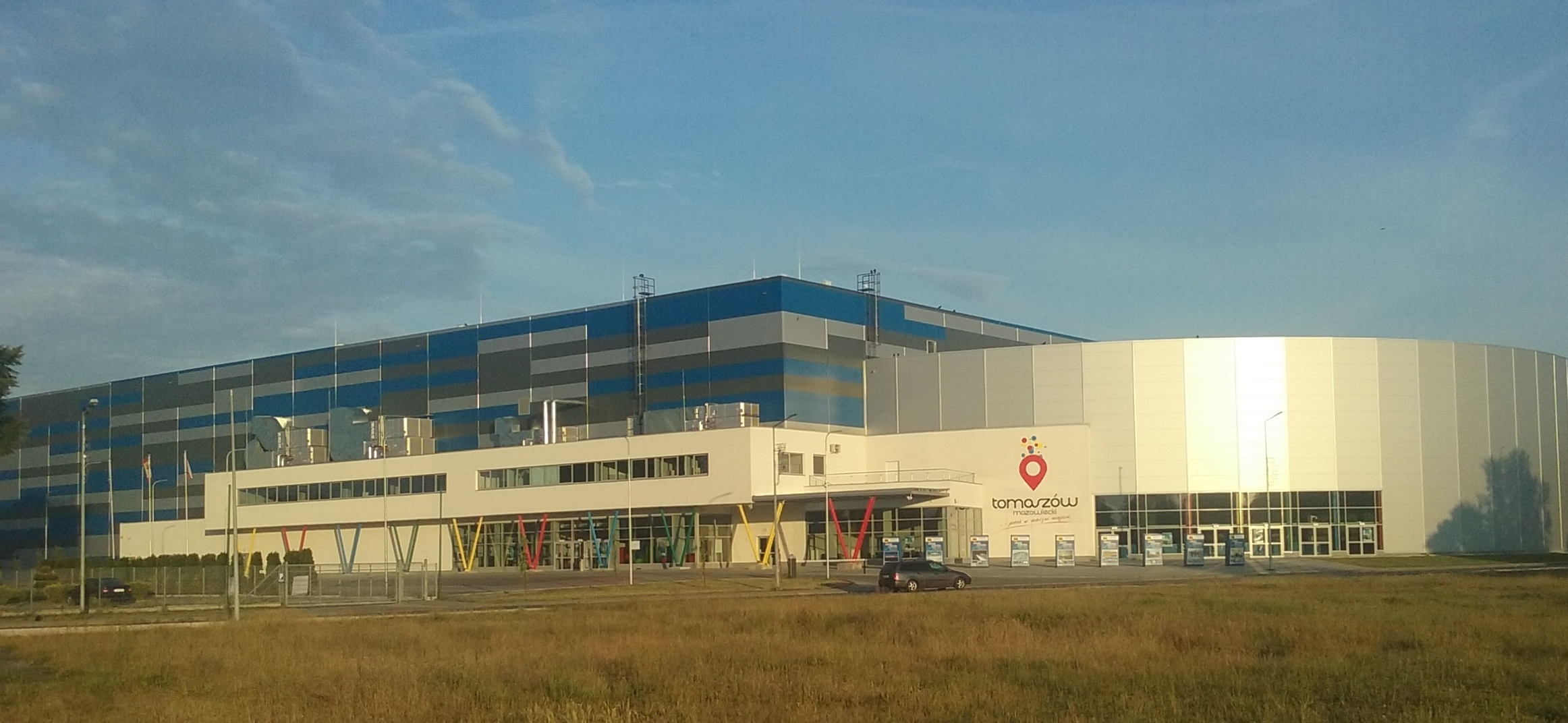
Arena Lodowa Tomaszów Mazowiecki, Poland

This is a list of all full-length (400 meter) indoor speed skating rinks in the world. The Richmond Olympic Oval and the Sport und Koncert Komplex (Winter Stadium) are the only venues to have been dismantled as a speed skating rink, in 2010 and 1992 respectively. The first indoor artificial speed skating oval was the Sportforum Hohenschönhausen in East Berlin, Germany in 1985. The first indoor artificial speed skating oval used in the Winter Olympics was the Olympic Oval in Calgary, Alberta, Canada in 1988. Since the 1994 Winter Olympics in Lillehammer, Norway, all speed skating competitions have been held in indoor ovals.

== Current rinks ==
Venue	City	Country	Altitude (m)	Altitude (ft)	Opened	Olympics	Capacity
Minsk Arena	Minsk	Belarus	209	686	2010		3,000
Olympic Oval	Calgary	Canada	1,105	3,625	1987	1988	4,000
Pomeroy Sport Centre	Fort St. John	Canada	671	2,201	2009		1,000
Centre de glaces Intact Assurance	Quebec City	Canada	103	338	2021		
Beijing National Speed Skating Oval	Beijing	China	49	161	2020	2022	12,000
Erqi Training Base Beijing-Fengtai	Beijing	China	64	210	2019		
Jilin Provincial Speed Skating Rink	Changchun	China	210	690	2016		2,600
Daqing Stadium	Daqing	China	149	489	2005		1,800
Heilongjiang Indoor Rink	Harbin	China	141	463	1995		4,500
The Ice Sports Training Center Hulun Buir-Hailar	Hulunbuir	China	615	2,018	2019		
Indoor Ice Rink	Qiqihar	China	146	479	2007		
Bayi Speed Skating Oval	Shenyang	China	48	157	1999		
Xinjiang Ice Sport Centre	Ürümqi	China	1,710	5,610	2015		
Sportforum Hohenschönhausen	Berlin	Germany	34	112	1985		3,700
Gunda-Niemann-Stirnemann-Halle	Erfurt	Germany	214	702	2001		4,000
Eisstadion Inzell	Inzell	Germany	690	2,260	2011		6,000
Oval Lingotto	Turin	Italy	233	764	2005	2006	8,500
YS Arena Hachinohe	Hachinohe	Japan	13	43	2019		
M-Wave	Nagano	Japan	346	1,135	1996	1998	6,400
Meiji Hokkaido-Tokachi Oval	Obihiro	Japan	79	259	2009		3,000
Alau Ice Palace	Astana	Kazakhstan	348	1,142	2011		8,000
Leisure World Ice Center	Dronten	Netherlands	−3	−9.8	1998		
De Westfries	Hoorn	Netherlands	0	0	2006		
IJsbaan Twente	Enschede	Netherlands	27	89	2008		2,000
Kardinge	Groningen	Netherlands	0	0	1993		
Thialf	Heerenveen	Netherlands	0	0	1986	2030	12,500
Elfstedenhal	Leeuwarden	Netherlands	0	0	2015		
Schaatsbaan Rotterdam	Rotterdam	Netherlands	−2	−6.6	2013		
Ireen Wüst IJsbaan	Tilburg	Netherlands	13	43	2009		
Fosenhallen	Botngård	Norway	8	26	2007		1,500
Vikingskipet	Hamar	Norway	125	410	1992	1994	10,600
Arena Nordvest	Kristiansund	Norway	22	72	2018		
Sørmarka Arena	Stavanger	Norway	48	157	2010		4,000
Arena Lodowa Tomaszów Mazowiecki	Tomaszów Mazowiecki	Poland	153	502	2017		11,000
Uralskaya Molniya	Chelyabinsk	Russia	222	728	2005		1,600
Ice Arena Baikal	Irkutsk	Russia	442	1,450	2020		6,059
Ice Arena Kuzbass	Kemerovo	Russia	113	371	2021		6,000
Speed Skating Centre	Kolomna	Russia	120	390	2006		6,150
Ice Palace Krylatskoye	Moscow	Russia	127	417	2004		8,000
Gangneung Oval	Gangneung	South Korea	26	85	2015	2018	8,000
Taereung International Skating Rink	Seoul	South Korea	63	207	2000		2,700
Tingvalla isstadion	Karlstad	Sweden	50	160	2022		1,800
Pettit National Ice Center	West Allis	United States	216	709	1993		2 500
Utah Olympic Oval	Kearns	United States	1,423	4,669	2000	2002	6,500

== Closed/Reconfigured rinks ==
Venue	City	Country	Altitude (m)	Altitude (ft)	Opened	Closed	Olympics
Adler Arena Skating Center	Sochi	Russia	27	89	2012	2014 (Note: After the Olympics the rink is to be converted into a trade and exhibition center.)	2014
Milano Ice Park	Milan	Italy	122	400	2025	2026 (Note: After the Olympics the rink is to be converted into a temporary figure skating and ice hockey rink.)	2026
Richmond Olympic Oval	Richmond	Canada	4	13	2008	2010 (Note: Reconfigured into a community centre including NHL/short track sized arena, track and fitness area. Pre-construction documents indicated that the full length oval would be covered by rubber mats to allow it to host future long track competitions. However, its status is currently unknown.)	2010
Sport und Koncert Komplex (Winter Stadium)	St. Petersburg	Russia	15	49	1981	1992	
