= CKNL-FM =

Radio station in Fort St. John, British Columbia

Coordinates: 56°04′38″N 120°38′05″W

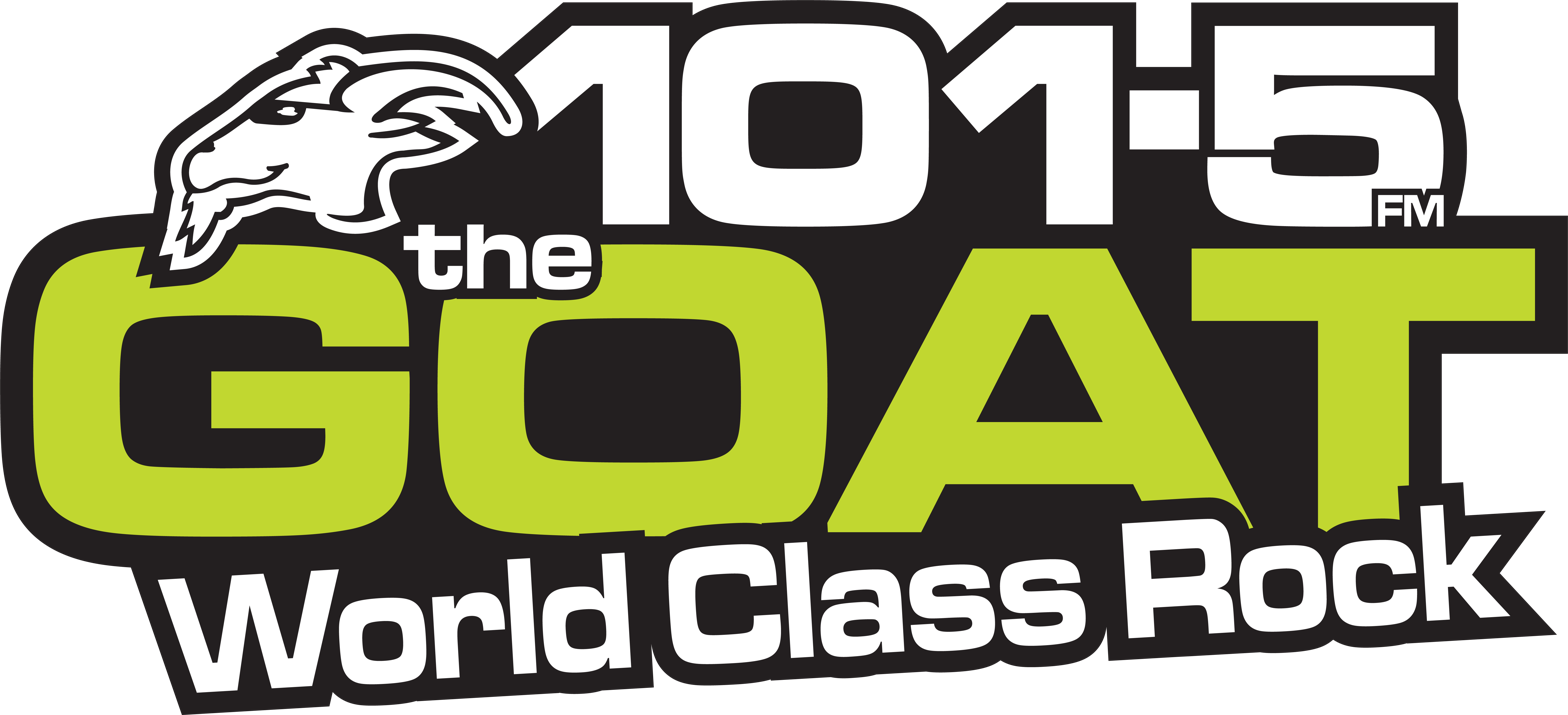
- Fort St. John, British Columbia; Canada
- Broadcast area: Peace River Regional District
- Frequency: 101.5 MHz
- Branding: 101.5 The Goat

Programming
- Format: Active rock

Ownership
- Owner: Vista Radio
- Sister stations: CHRX-FM

History
- First air date: June 20, 1962
- Former call signs: CKNL (1962–2003)
- Call sign meaning: Northland

Technical information
- Class: B
- ERP: 40,000 watts

Links
- Website: https://www.mypeaceregionnow.com/

CKNL-FM is a Canadian radio station that broadcasts a rock format at 101.5 FM in Fort St. John, British Columbia. The station is branded as 101.5 The GOAT and is owned by Vista Radio.

== History ==
The station originally began broadcasting June 20, 1962 at 970 AM, and later moved to 560 AM and finally to the FM dial at 101.5 FM in 2003. When the FM transition was approved, the station was to continue the country format of the former 560 CKNL. However, likely in response to the recent licensing of CKFU-FM in the same market at that time, when the station flipped to FM the format was switched to a rock station as 101.5 The Bear.

As part of a mass format reorganization by Bell Media, on May 18, 2021, CKNL flipped to adult hits under the Bounce branding.

On February 8, 2024, Bell announced a restructuring that included the sale of 45 of its 103 radio stations to seven buyers, subject to approval by the CRTC, including CKNL, which is to be sold to Vista Radio. The application was approved on February 13, 2025.

On April 14, 2025, CKNL flipped back to active rock under Vista Radio's The Goat branding.

== Former logos ==
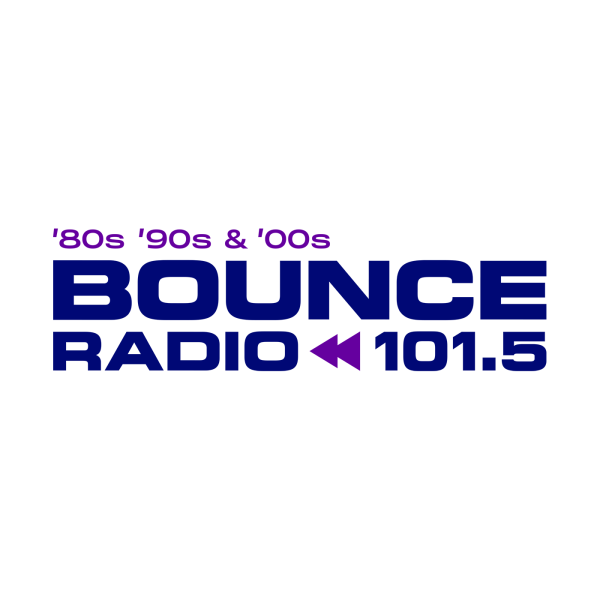

== Rebroadcasters ==
- CKHH-FM 106.1 FM - Hudson's Hope
