= North Cariboo Air =

Canadian airline

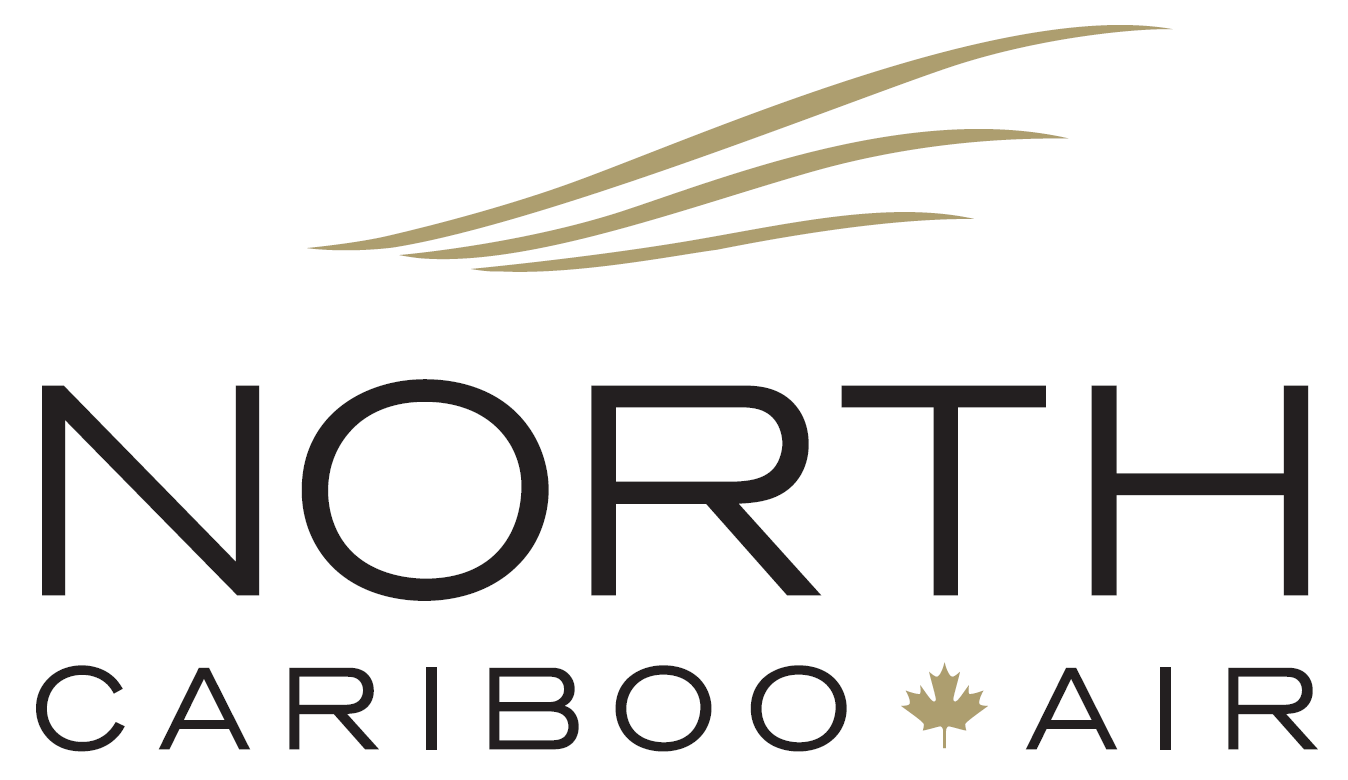

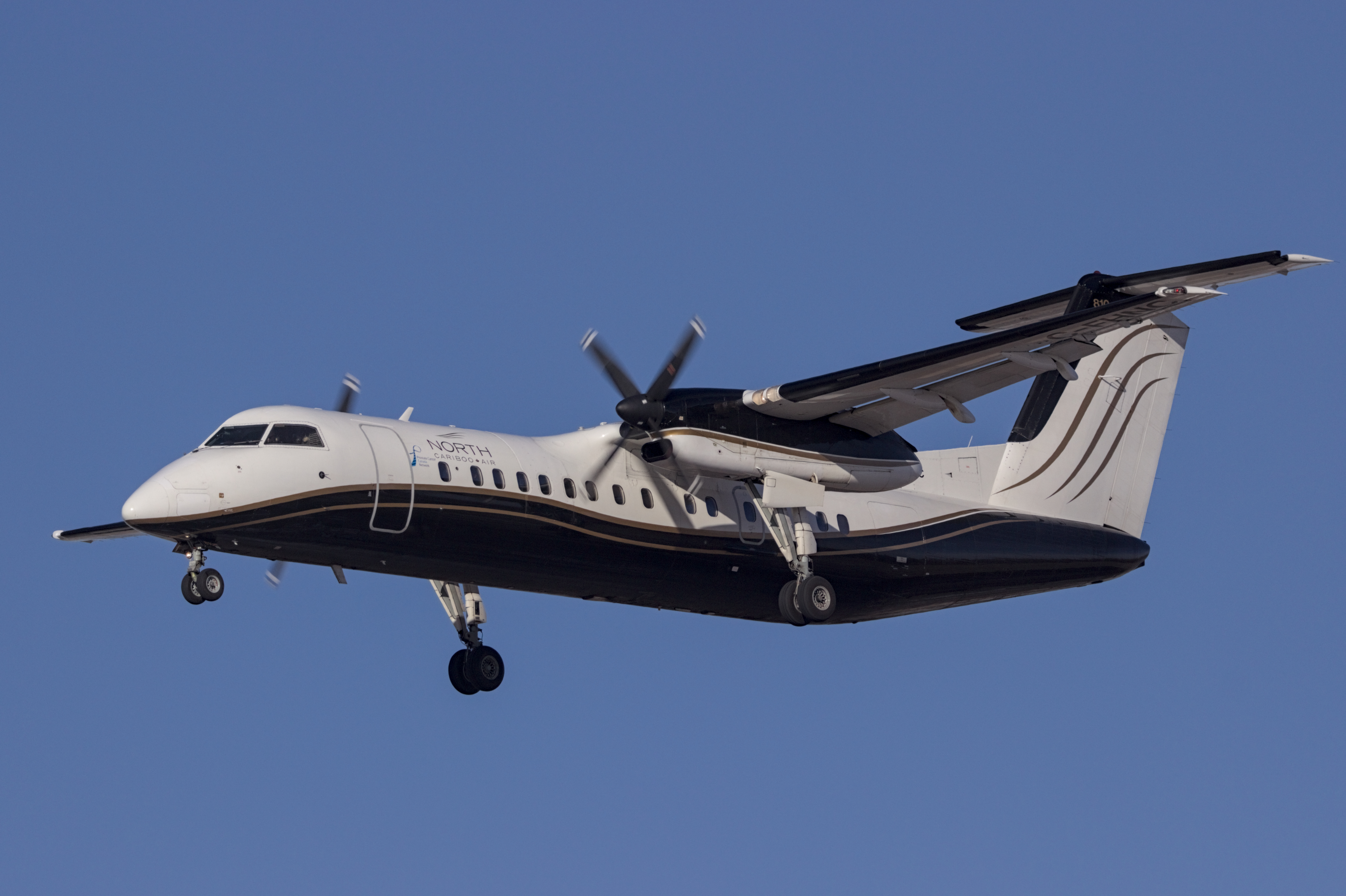
- North Cariboo Air Dash 8
| IATA | ICAO | Call sign |
|---|---|---|
| - | NCB | NORTH CARIBOU |
- Founded: 1957
- AOC #: Canada: 1444; United States: NCBF667G
- Operating bases: Calgary International, Edmonton International, Fort St. John; Vancouver International, Prince George
- Fleet size: 8
- Destinations: charter
- Parent company: North Cariboo Flying Service Limited
- Headquarters: Calgary, Alberta
- Key people: Randy Gee (president), Trevor Wakefield (vice president), Paul Rudy (vice president)
- Website: https://www.flynca.com/

North Cariboo Air or North Cariboo Flying Services is an airline based in Alberta and British Columbia, Canada. It operates charter flights primarily for the oil and gas industry, as well as executive and general charter services, including sports teams and leisure groups both within and outside Canada. North Cariboo Air has a fleet of eight aircraft registered with Transport Canada. These aircraft range in size from nine to fifty seats, allowing for accommodating and adaptation of all project sizes. In addition NCFS offers private terminals in Calgary, Edmonton, Fort St. John, Vancouver and Prince George. The airline also offers cargo services, aerodrome management and fixed-base operator services.

== History ==
The story of North Cariboo Air starts in Williams Lake, British Columbia located in the North Cariboo region of British Columbia. Originally incorporated as North Cariboo Flying Service in 1957, the fleet consisted of a single Aeronca Champion aircraft that could carry one or two passengers to various locations throughout the interior of BC. Today, with a fleet of 14 aircraft, including the Avro RJ 100, NCFS has expanded include various destinations across Western Canada and the United States.

== Fleet ==
As of 4 October 2026, the North Cariboo Air fleet registered with Transport Canada consists of the following:

North Cariboo Air fleet
| Aircraft Type | No. of aircraft | Variants | Notes |
|---|---|---|---|
| Beechcraft 1900 | 4 | Model 1900D | Seats 19 |
| Beechcraft King Air | 1 | Model 100 | Not listed at North Cariboo website |
| Christen A-1B | 1 | A-1B | Not listed at North Cariboo website |
| De Havilland Canada Dash 8 | 2 | Series 300 (311) | Seats 50 |
| Total | 8 | | |

The North Caribou Air site lists at least one British Aerospace 146, a RJ100 Series, that seats 100 people. However, according to Transport Canada all RJ100 in Canada are owned by Summit Air.
