= Swanberg =

Swanberg is a surname. Notable people with the surname include:

- Joe Swanberg (born 1981), American film director, producer, writer, and actor
- Kris Swanberg (born 1980), American businesswoman, filmmaker, and actress
- W. A. Swanberg (1907–1992), American biographer

== See also ==
- Swanberg Air, airline
