= Co-op Community Centre =

Sports venue in Fort St. John, British Columbia

- Interactive map of Co-op Community Centre
- Location: 9324 – 96 Avenue; BC V1J 4 Fort St. John, British Columbia, Canada
- Coordinates: 56.240°N 120.841°W
- Owner: City of Fort St. John
- Capacity: 1,000
- Surface: Artificial ice

Construction
- Opened: 13 October 2010
- Cost: $44 million

The Co-op Centre (or Co-op Community Centre), formerly known as the Pomeroy Sport Centre, is a sports venue in the Canadian city of Fort St. John, British Columbia. The indoor arena features two ice hockey rinks, a long-track speed skating rink and a walking track. The venue was commissioned on 23 December 2009, and officially opened 13 October 2010.

== History ==
Construction of the venue cost $44 million, of which $15 million was paid for by the provincial government. In addition to meeting local recreational needs, the venue was part of a provincial effort to provide for more elite sports efforts in the regional centres. In particular, the Peace River Region had been an important space for the development of several Canadian top speed skaters.

The first use of the speed skating rink took place on 23 December 2009. The venue was officially opened on 13 October 2010.

== Facilities ==
The venue covers a floor area of 13,000 square metres (140,000 sq ft). The ground floor features two North American-sized ice hockey rinks, with a combined spectator capacity of 1,000. The second floor features a 400-metre (1,300 ft) long-track ice rink at an elevation of 671 metres (2,201 ft) above mean sea level. The upper deck features a 380-metre (1,250 ft) walkway. All ice surfaces are artificial.

The Co-op Centre is one of only three indoor long-track speed skating rinks in Canada, the others being the Olympic Oval in Calgary and Centre de Glaces in Quebec City and one of five in the Americas. It remains the sole such indoor venue in British Columbia after the Richmond Olympic Oval was converted to a general-purpose recreational centre after the 2010 Winter Olympics.

The venue is built on a 3-hectare (7.4-acre) lot with 259 parking spaces on 96 Avenue. The lot features 1,700 square metres (18,000 sq ft) of pedestrian plazas and 6,500 square metres (70,000 sq ft) of landscape planting. The landscaping was designed by Urban Systems.
