= CHRX-FM =

Radio station in Fort St. John, British Columbia

Coordinates: 56°04′38″N 120°38′05″W

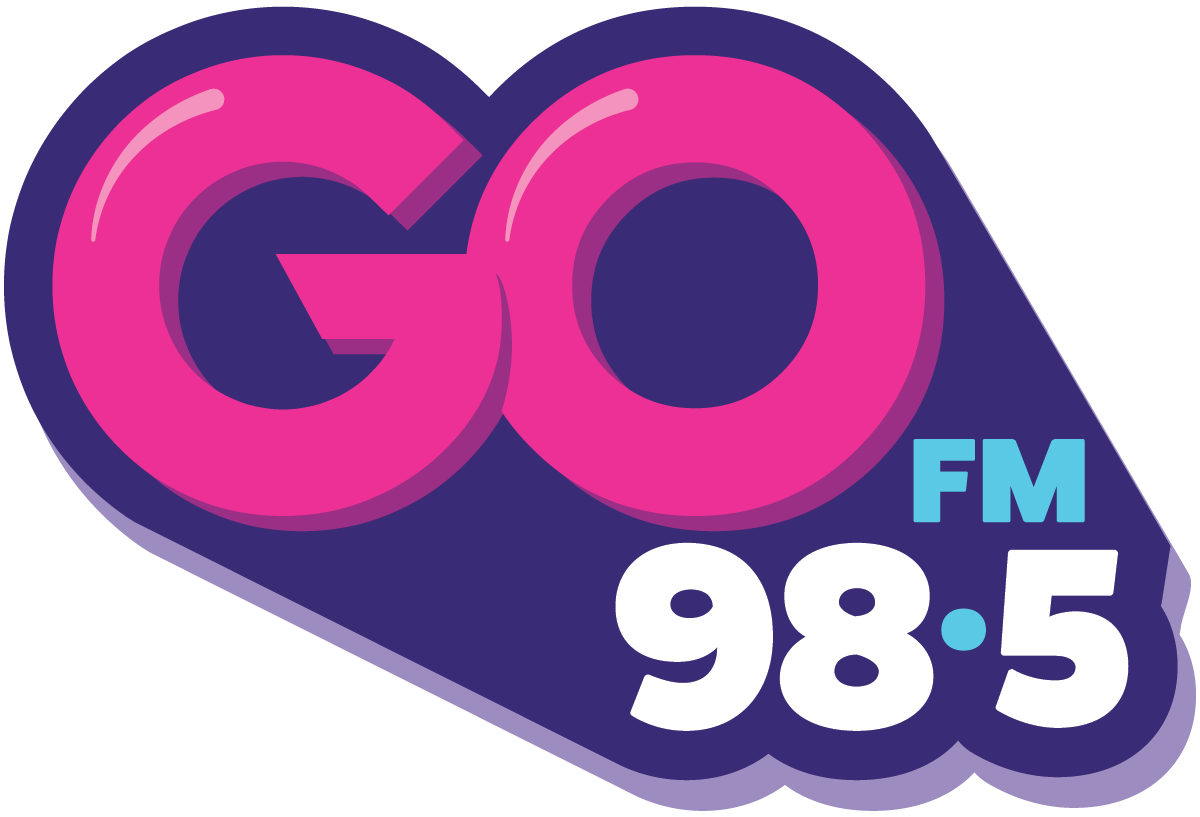
- Fort St. John, British Columbia; Canada
- Broadcast area: Peace River Regional District
- Frequency: 98.5 MHz
- Branding: 98.5 GO FM

Programming
- Format: Adult contemporary

Ownership
- Owner: Vista Radio
- Sister stations: CKNL-FM

History
- First air date: 1997

Technical information
- Class: C1
- ERP: 50,000 watts
- HAAT: 166.5 metres (546 ft)

Links
- Webcast: Listen live

CHRX-FM is a Canadian radio station that broadcasts an adult contemporary format at 98.5 MHz in Fort St. John, British Columbia with a rebroadcaster at 95.1 FM in Dawson Creek with the callsign CHRX-FM-1. 98.5's signal carries up to Wonowon, Rose Prairie and Dawson Creek. 95.1's signal carries up to just outside of Grande Prairie, south to Chetwynd, and up to Taylor. The station is branded as 98.5 GO FM and is owned by Vista Radio.

The station began broadcasting in 1997.

Prior to 2021, CHRX was branded as 98.5 Sun FM with a CHR/Top 40 format.

In 2021, CHRX flipped to adult contemporary and rebranded as Move 98.5.

On February 8, 2024, Bell Media announced a restructuring that included the sale of 45 of its 103 radio stations to seven buyers, subject to approval by the CRTC, including CHRX, which is to be sold to Vista Radio. The application was approved on February 13, 2025.

The sale took effect April 14, 2025. Vista rebranded the station as 98.5 GO FM maintaining the adult contemporary format.

== Former logo ==
Former "Sun FM" logo until 2021
