= School District 60 Peace River North =

School district in British Columbia, Canada

Location
- Fort St. John Fort St. John, Buick, Hudson's Hope, Prespatou, Taylor, Wonowon in Northeast Canada

District information
- Superintendent: Dr Stephen Petrucci
- Schools: 22
- Budget: CA$70 million

Students and staff
- Students: 6000

Other information
- Website: www.prn.bc.ca

School District 60 Peace River North is a school district in northeastern British Columbia adjacent to the Alberta border. Its board office is in Fort St. John which is also where the majority of the schools are located. It also serves the outlying communities of Taylor, Prespatou, Hudson's Hope, Buick and Wonowon.

== History ==
School District 60 was the first district in British Columbia to institute a laptop computer program on a large scale (grade 6 and 7). Currently the program provides an iPad to each student in grade 6. SD60 is well known for partnerships with community, industry, post-secondary, neighbouring districts, and businesses.

== Schools ==
School	Location	Grades
Alwin Holland Elementary School	Fort St John	K-6
Anne Roberts Young Elementary School	Fort St John	K-6
Baldonnel Elementary School	Baldonnel	K-6
Bert Ambrose Elementary School	Fort St John	K-6
Bert Bowes Middle School	Fort St John	7-9
Buick Creek Elementary School	Buick	K-7
C M Finch Elementary School	Fort St John	K-6
Charlie Lake Elementary School	Charlie Lake	K-6
Clearview Elem-Jr Secondary School	Fort St John	K-10
Dr Kearney Middle School	Fort St John	7-9
Duncan Cran Elementary School	Fort St John	K-6
Ecole Central Elem School of the Arts	Fort St John	K-6
Hudson's Hope School	Hudson's Hope	K-12
Key Learning Centre	Fort St John	8-10
Margaret Ma Murray Community School	Fort St John	K-6
North Peace Secondary School (including Energetic Learning Campus)	Fort St John	10-12
Prespatou Elem-Secondary School	Prespatou	K-12
Robert Ogilvie Elementary School	Fort St John	K-6
SD 060 Connect Program	Fort St John	K-12
Taylor Elementary School	Taylor	K-6
Upper Halfway Elem-Jr Secondary School	Halfway River	K-8
Upper Pine Elem-Jr Secondary School	Rose Prairie	K-8
Wonowon Elementary School	Wonowon	K-8

== See also ==
- List of school districts in British Columbia
