= Peace Region Internet Society =

Peace Region Internet Society (PRIS)
- Company type: Nonprofit
- Industry: Telecommunications
- Founded: 1994
- Headquarters: Dawson Creek, British Columbia, Canada
- Website: pris.ca

The Peace Region Internet Society ("PRIS") is a 'not-for-profit' society founded in 1994 to provide affordable Internet access to the people, businesses and enterprises of the rural Peace River Country of Northern British Columbia.

== History ==
The Internet first became available in British Columbia in 1988. At that time, it was mainly the province of academic institutions such as the University of British Columbia and Simon Fraser University. As demand for access to internet resources from the general populace rose, these institutions were forced to scale back their Internet services to students/faculty and paying customers. Nevertheless, demand for Internet services remained high. In 1991, The Peace River Science, Technology, and Innovation Council (PRSTIC) proposed to the Science Council of British Columbia (SCBC) that an Internet service provider should be created to serve both the SCBC and the broader education community in the province. The Peace Region Internet Society was subsequently established under the Society Act on July 11, 1994, having received seed funding from the Science Council of British Columbia as part of a special initiative to provide ISP's in each of the provinces eight regional council areas. By the end of 1995, PRIS had a membership of just under 700, had hired a permanent employee to manage day-to-day operations (prior to this the society had been run by volunteers), were financially self-sufficient and had managed to fulfill all of the obligations that their initial grant application had placed on them. In the years between 1997 and 1999, PRIS continued to grow, taking on more members. By the end of 1997, the society had 2100 members, and hired on more employees, bringing the count up to 4 full-time employees.

== Organization ==
The society is governed by an internal constitution which dictates its primary purpose of establishing, maintaining, operating and administrating a publicly available internet node for the people of the region, to afford its members all the privileges and advantages of an internet society, to acquire and manage all necessary forms of software to accomplish the above and to carry all of the aforesaid without the purpose of gain or profit for members of the society.

In addition, the PRIS is also bound by its internal bylaws, which lay out the duties of various members, officers and directors, and how they may conduct themselves in a financial and business context.

== Location ==
The main office for the PRIS is located at 929, 106th Avenue, Dawson Creek, British Columbia

== Services ==
The PRIS provides its clients with a range of internet options, including Dial-up internet access, DSL, Naked DSL and Wi-Fi.

== Service Area ==
As well as servicing the rural areas of the Peace River Country, the PRIS serves the communities of Fort Nelson, Fort St. John, Dawson Creek, Chetwynd, Tumbler Ridge and Hudson Hope.
