= Swanberg Air =

Airline of Canada

IATA	ICAO	Call sign
-	-	—
- Founded: 2000
- Ceased operations: 2011
- Destinations: 10
- Headquarters: Grande Prairie, Alberta
- Website: www.swanbergair.com

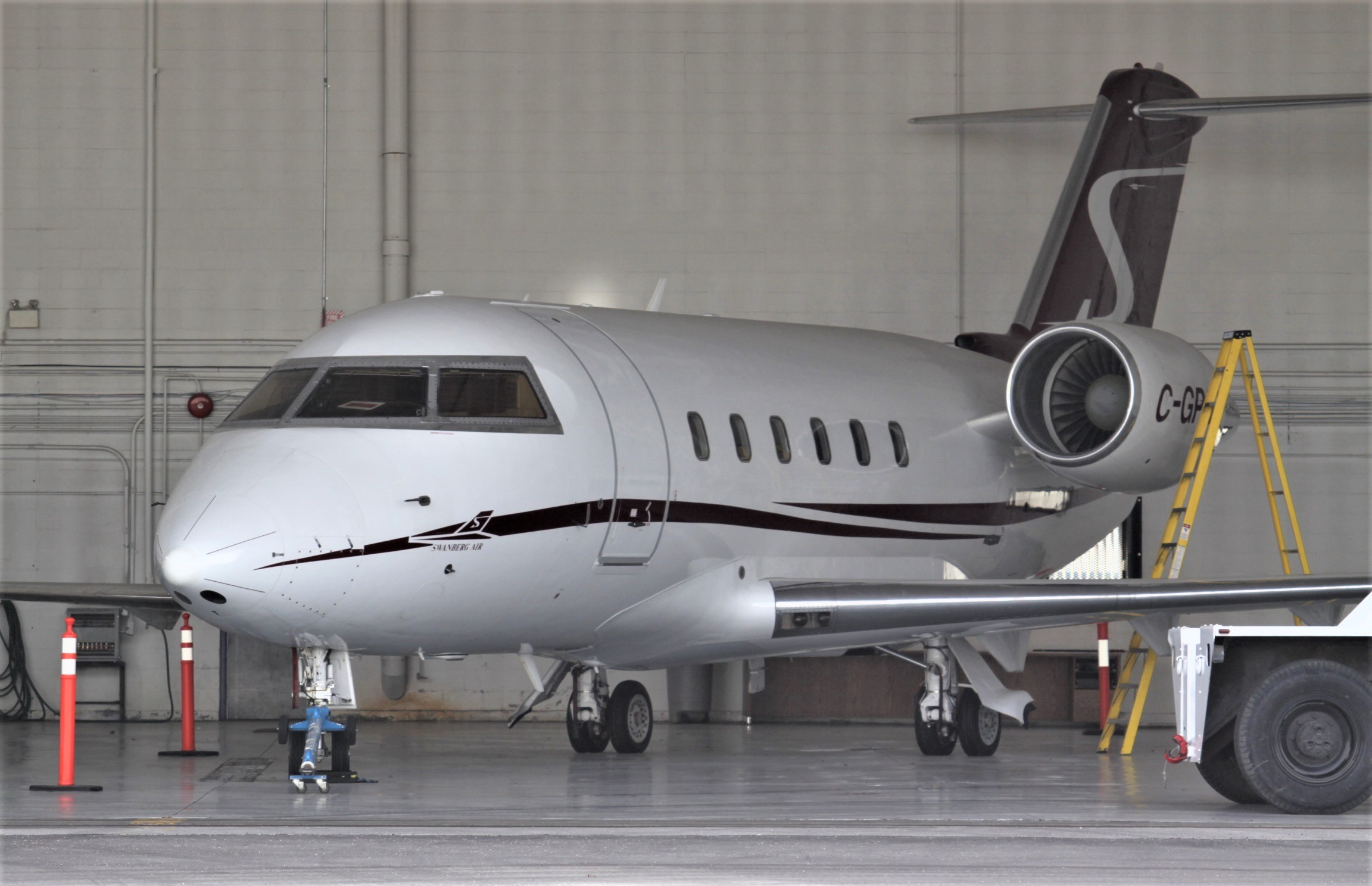
Swanberg Air Canadair Challenger

Swanberg Air was an airline based in Grande Prairie, Alberta, Canada. It operated cargo, scheduled and charter passenger services in Alberta, Saskatchewan and British Columbia. The airline ceased operations in 2011.

== Destinations ==
Destinations:

- Alberta
  - Calgary (Calgary International Airport - Departing from Swanberg hangar)
  - Edmonton (Shell Aero Centre)
  - Grande Prairie (Grande Prairie Airport - Departing from Swanberg hangar)
- British Columbia
  - Fort St. John (Fort St. John Airport)
  - Fort Nelson (Fort Nelson Airport)

== See also ==
- List of defunct airlines of Canada
