= Charlie Lake Cave =

Archaeological site in British Columbia, Canada

- Tse'KWa
- HbRf 39
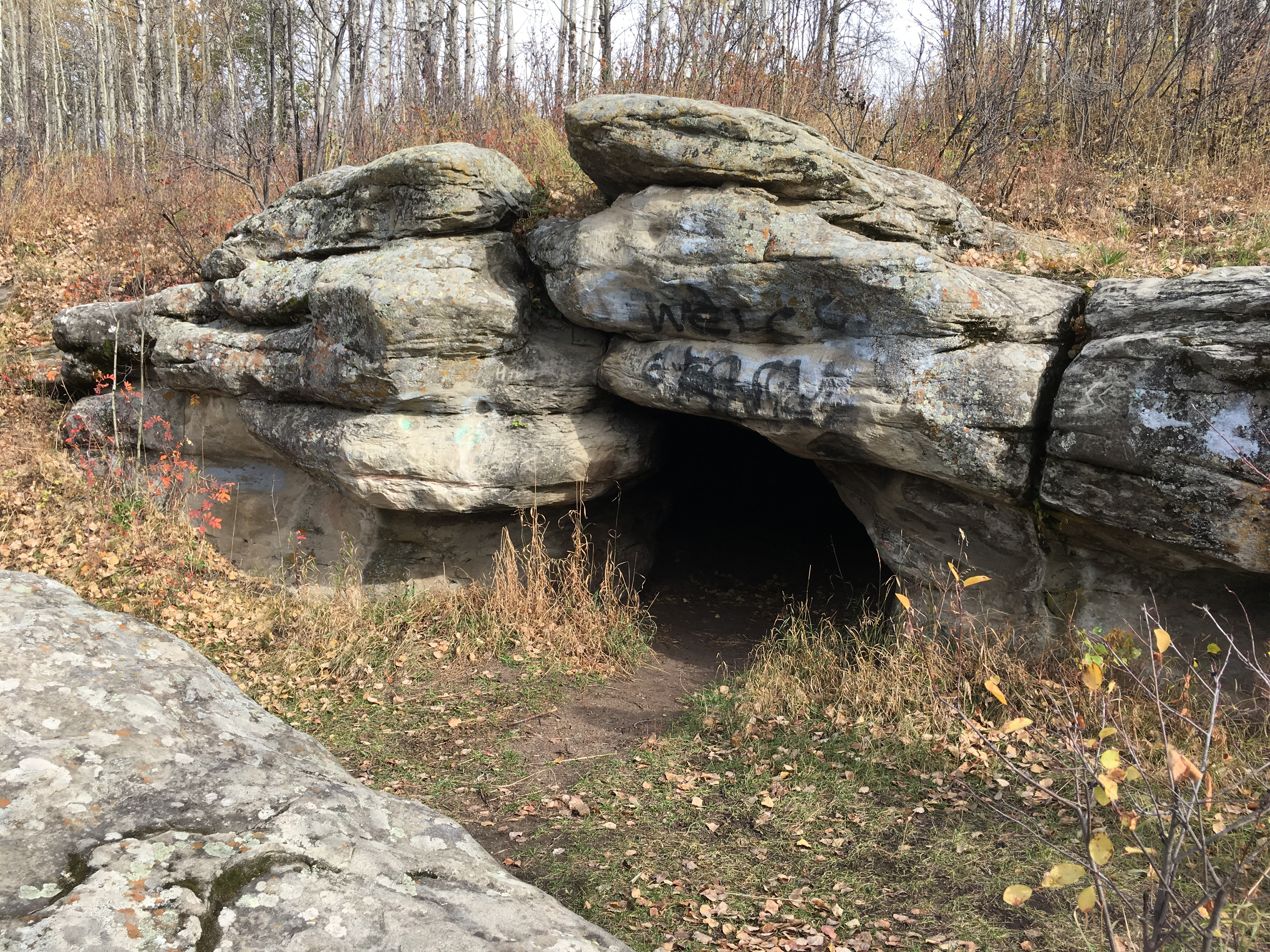

- Location in Canada
- 56°16′22″N 120°56′39″W
- Location: British Columbia

The Charlie Lake Cave (Tse'KWa) is an archaeological site in the Canadian province of British Columbia. Its Borden System designation is HbRf 39. In a waste pit in front of the small cave, artifacts up to 10,500 years old have been found which are considered to be the oldest evidence of ritual acts in Canada. The cave is located a few kilometres north of Fort St. John, near Charlie Lake.

No artifacts were found in the cave itself, which measures 45 m × 6 m (148 ft × 20 ft), but in a kind of waste pit in front of the cave entrance. The artifacts go back 11,000 years, including a fluted point, six retouched flakes and a small bone bead. These findings provide evidence of the northward migration of hunters and bison. In addition, two buried ravens were found, which are the oldest traces of rituals in Canada.

Knut R. Fladmark examined the archaeological site for the first time in 1974 and returned in 1983. Excavation areas were opened, and paleo-Indian stone tools and animal bones remains were discovered. The excavation layers were found to be intact, and it soon turned out that the oldest layer is representative of the historic megafauna. This first excavation revealed five layers.

== See also ==
- Goshen point

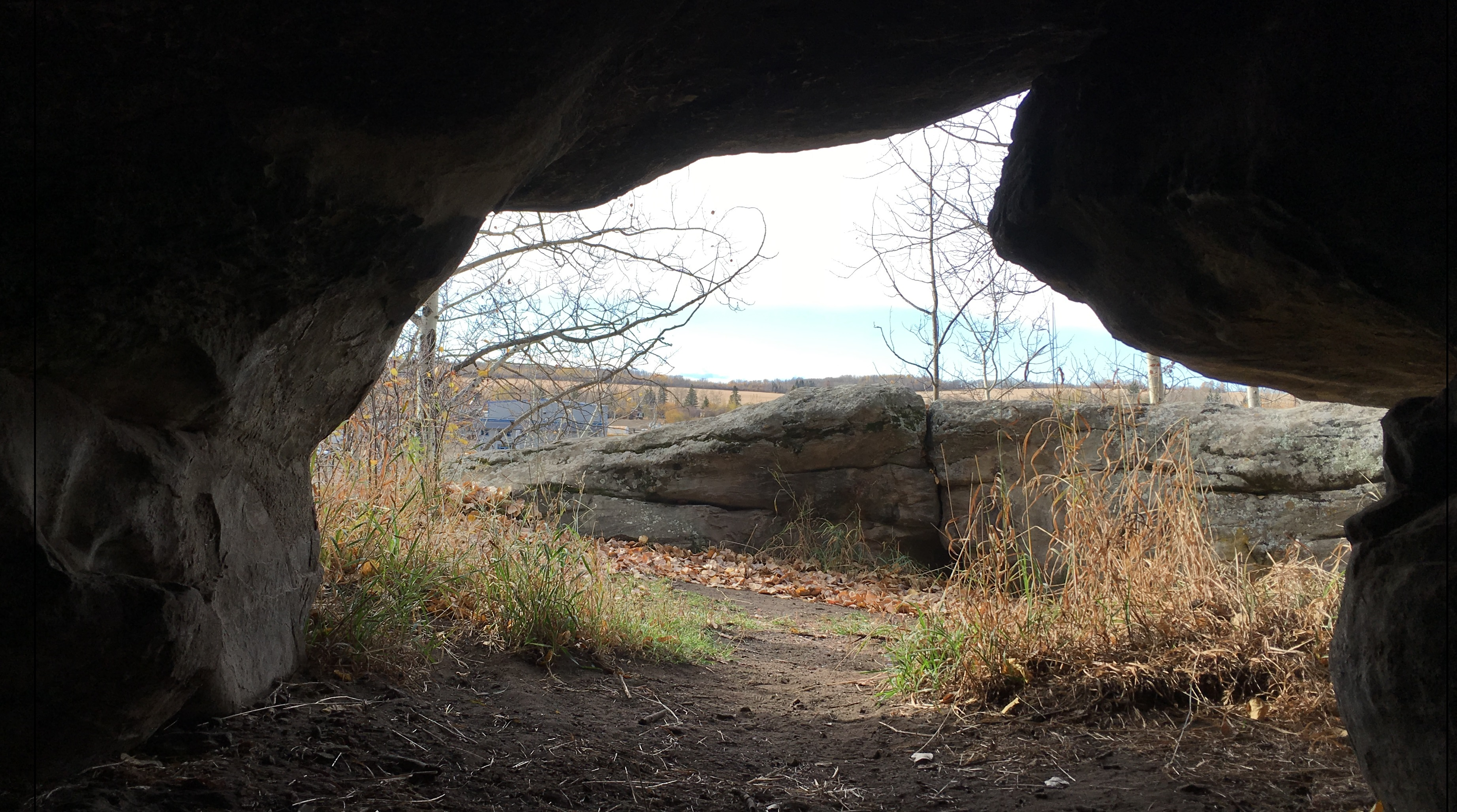
View looking out from within Charlie Lake Cave.

== Bibliography ==
- Knut R. Fladmark, Jonathan C. Driver and Diana Alexander: The Paleoindian Component at Charlie Lake Cave (HbRf 39), British Columbia, in: American Antiquity 53/2 (1988) 371–384.
- Jonathan C. Driver: Raven Skeletons from Paleoindian Contexts, Charlie Lake Cave, British Columbia, in: American Antiquity 64/2 (1999) 289–298.
- Jonathan C. Driver: Stratigraphy, Radiocarbon Dating and Culture History of Charlie Lake Cave, British Columbia, in: Arctic 49/3 (1996) 265–277, online, PDF, 592 kB.
