= North Peace Secondary School =

Location
- 9304 86th Street; Fort St. John, British Columbia, V1J 6L9; Canada; 56.24005°N 120.82282°W

Information
- School type: Public, high school
- Founded: 1987 (current NPSS facility), 2012 (Energetic Learning Campus)
- School board: School District 60 Peace River North
- Principal: Todd Koponyas
- Grades: 10-12
- Enrollment: 1,100+ (2012)
- Language: English
- Campus: Urban
- Website: www.prn.bc.ca?page_id=39

North Peace Secondary School (or "NPSS") is a high school located in Fort St. John, British Columbia, Canada. NPSS is operated by the North Peace School District and is the designated secondary school for the city's two middle schools. The school opened in its current facility in 1989 which underwent a significant expansion in 2002. Prior to the 2010–2011 school year NPSS operated grades 9–12. In recent years over one quarter of NPSS students were of Aboriginal descent and a significant number of students were employed at least 20 hours per week.

== Academic programs ==
In addition to standard core curriculum programs, the following are offered:

- ACE IT – On-site programs include Residential Carpentry, and Cook Training
- Automotive
- Construction
- Dual Trade Programs (a partnership with Northern Lights College)
- Dual Credit / Northern Opportunities
- Green Certificate Program (a partnership with Grande Prairie Regional College in Alberta.
- Music and Performing Arts
- Project Heavy Duty
- Project Natural Resource Management
- Secondary School Apprenticeship
- Welding and metal fabrication
- Woodlands Operations Learning Foundation

== Energetic Learning Campus ==
The Energetic Learning Campus (ELC) is a 180 student, 13,000 square foot branch campus of North Peace Secondary. It is located within the Pomeroy Sport Centre (PSC) located several blocks away from the NPSS main campus. The name is derived from the city's motto, "The Energetic City". The ELC came about in response to a demand for additional capacity at NPSS, itself a result of the provincial government's requirement to provide all-day Kindergarten classes. In 2010 the City offered to lease unfinished space in their newly completed community sports and recreation complex, the PSC, which prevented the need for acquisition of modular classrooms ("portables"). The cost for converting the unfinished space was $6 million. The ELC opened in 2011 with 160 students and the first school year was intended to be primarily grade 10 students with fewer grade 11 and 12 students.

The PSC is a 3-story public facility with 2 NHL sized ice rinks, a concession, 12 dressing rooms, public meeting rooms, a retail juice outlet, an indoor Olympic-sized long track speed skating oval, and a 340 meter long walking track (the "Northern Vac Track"). All ice surfaces can be removed to provide event space in excess of 140,000 square feet. When the facility was opened it included over 20,000 square feet of unfinished space on the first floor. The city offered the use of it to the school district for an expansion of North Peace Secondary School.

The ELC facility was designed to support a collaborative project-based learning curriculum related to a sports academy program, recreational facility maintenance, and kinesiology instruction using the PSC as an active learning environment. The ELC does not have traditional school classrooms, or bells. Learning spaces are flexible and view directly out onto the hockey rinks. Student worktables and chairs are on casters. Students use the PSC facilities daily as part of their mandatory daily physical activity.
