= Charlie Lake Provincial Park =

Provincial park in British Columbia, Canada

- IUCN category II (national park)
- Location within British Columbia
- Interactive map of Charlie Lake Provincial Park
- Location: Peace River Land District, British Columbia, Canada
- Nearest city: Ashcroft, BC
- Coordinates: 56°18′29″N 120°59′45″W
- Area: 176 ha (430 acres)
- Established: May 20, 1964
- Governing body: BC Parks
- Website: bcparks.ca/charlie-lake-park/

Charlie Lake Provincial Park is a provincial park in British Columbia, Canada, established on the western shore of Charlie Lake. It is roughly 92 hectares in size.

== History and conservation ==
The park was established May 20, 1964.

The park aims to protect aspen, birch, alder, lodgepole pine, Saskatoon, soopalalie, flat-top spirea, waxberry and squashberry. The park is one of a system of 3 parks protecting the poorly represented Halfway Plateau Ecosection. The primary role of the park is to provide recreational opportunities for regional residents. Recreational opportunities include hiking, boating, angling and cycling.

== Location ==
Located 11 kilometres north of Fort St. John, British Columbia.

== Size ==
92 hectares in size.
