= PRI =

PRI may refer to:

== Entertainment and media ==
- Performance Racing Industry, a magazine
- PRI Records, in Los Angeles, US
- Public Radio International, Minneapolis, US

== Measurements and codes ==
- Perceptual Reasoning Index, in the WAIS-IV intelligence test
- Photochemical Reflectance Index
- Pulse repetition interval

== Places ==
- Praslin Island Airport (IATA:PRI), Seychelles
- Puerto Rico (ISO 3166-1 alpha-3: PRI)

== Political parties ==
- Independent Regionalist Party, Chile
- Institutional Republican Party, Guatemala
- Institutional Revolutionary Party, Mexico
- Italian Republican Party, Italy

== Research organizations ==
- Pacific Research Institute, California, US
- Paleontological Research Institution, Ithaca, New York, US
- Penal Reform International, an international organisation
- Philippine Railways Institute, a transportation research and training center
- Population Research Institute (organization), Virginia, US, anti-contraception and abortion
- Prairie Research Institute, scientific body comprising the Natural History, Archaeology, Geology and Water surveys of Illinois

== Technology ==
- Cromemco PRI printer interface card
- Primary Rate Interface, telecommunication standard

== Other uses ==
- PRI disease resistant apple breeding program
- Principles for Responsible Investment, UN initiative
