= Charlie Lake (British Columbia) =

Lake in British Columbia, Canada

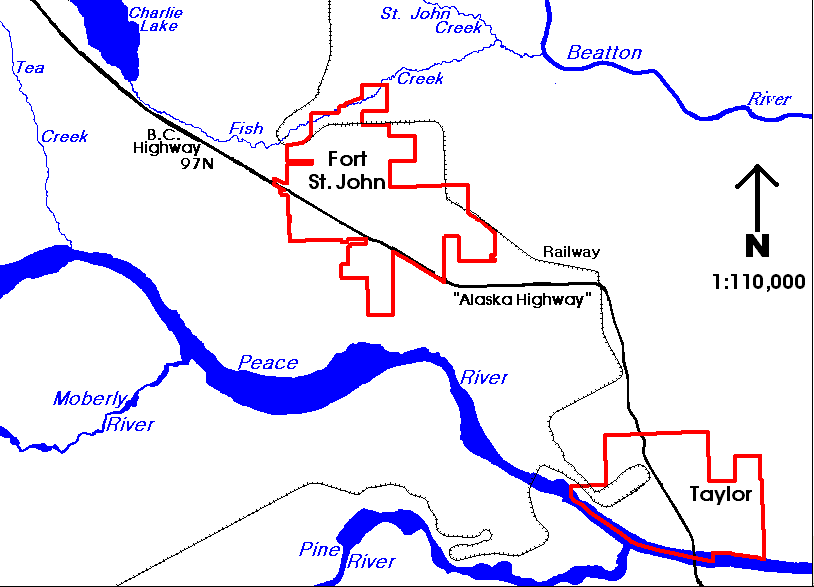
- Charlie Lake situated north-west of Fort St. John

- Location within British Columbia
- Coordinates: 56.32484°N 120.97536°W
- Primary inflows: Stoddart Creek
- Primary outflows: Stoddart Creek
- Basin countries: Canada
- Max. length: 13 kilometers (8.1 mi)
- Max. width: 3 km (1.9 mi)
- Surface elevation: 700 m (2,300 ft)
- Settlements: Charlie Lake

Charlie Lake is a lake in north-eastern British Columbia, Canada, situated 8 km (5.0 mi) west from Fort St. John, along the Alaska Highway. The lake provides the water supply for the city of Fort St. John. The Charlie Lake Formation, a stratigraphical unit of the Western Canadian Sedimentary Basin is named for the lake.

== Geography ==
The lake is situated at an elevation of 700 m (2,300 ft). It is formed along the Stoddart Creek, a right tributary of the Beatton River, itself a major tributary of the Peace River.

Two parks are established on the shores of the lake, Charlie Lake Provincial Park on the west shore, and Beatton Provincial Park on the east shore. The settlement of Charlie Lake lies at the southern tip of the lake.

== See also ==
- List of lakes of British Columbia
- Charlie Lake Cave
