= Wonowon =

Community in British Columbia, Canada

- Location of Wonowon in British Columbia Wonowon (Canada) Wonowon (North America)
- Coordinates: 56°43′42″N 121°48′24″W
- Country: Canada
- Province: British Columbia
- Area codes: 250, 778

Wonowon is a community in northeastern British Columbia, Canada, located at Mile 101 on Highway 97, the Alaska Highway. The present-day community name is derived from the mile number, "one-oh-one", however, the area was historically known as Blueberry. The community is part of the Peace River Regional District. The major business center for residents is Fort St. John, and the residents observe the same clock time as Fort St. John, including its abstinence from daylight saving time.

== Climate ==
Wonowon has a subarctic climate.

Climate data for Wonowon
| Month | Jan | Feb | Mar | Apr | May | Jun | Jul | Aug | Sep | Oct | Nov | Dec | Year |
|---|---|---|---|---|---|---|---|---|---|---|---|---|---|
| Record high °C (°F) | 8.5 (47.3) | 11.0 (51.8) | 13.0 (55.4) | 26.1 (79.0) | 30.5 (86.9) | 28.3 (82.9) | 32.0 (89.6) | 32.0 (89.6) | 26.0 (78.8) | 23.0 (73.4) | 12.0 (53.6) | 9.0 (48.2) | 32.0 (89.6) |
| Mean daily maximum °C (°F) | −7.2 (19.0) | −4.8 (23.4) | 0.4 (32.7) | 7.7 (45.9) | 14.3 (57.7) | 17.9 (64.2) | 20.0 (68.0) | 18.7 (65.7) | 13.5 (56.3) | 6.1 (43.0) | −5.7 (21.7) | −7.4 (18.7) | 6.1 (43.0) |
| Daily mean °C (°F) | −11.1 (12.0) | −9.7 (14.5) | −4.9 (23.2) | 2.4 (36.3) | 8.5 (47.3) | 12.2 (54.0) | 14.3 (57.7) | 13.2 (55.8) | 8.3 (46.9) | 1.9 (35.4) | −9.5 (14.9) | −11.3 (11.7) | 1.2 (34.2) |
| Mean daily minimum °C (°F) | −15.1 (4.8) | −14.5 (5.9) | −10.1 (13.8) | −3.0 (26.6) | 2.7 (36.9) | 6.4 (43.5) | 8.6 (47.5) | 7.6 (45.7) | 3.1 (37.6) | −2.4 (27.7) | −13.3 (8.1) | −15.2 (4.6) | −3.8 (25.2) |
| Record low °C (°F) | −39.0 (−38.2) | −40.0 (−40.0) | −34.4 (−29.9) | −23.0 (−9.4) | −9.0 (15.8) | −1.0 (30.2) | 0.0 (32.0) | −3.0 (26.6) | −12.8 (9.0) | −26.5 (−15.7) | −41.0 (−41.8) | −40.0 (−40.0) | −41.0 (−41.8) |
| Average precipitation mm (inches) | 23.0 (0.91) | 19.3 (0.76) | 27.1 (1.07) | 32.4 (1.28) | 63.7 (2.51) | 88.2 (3.47) | 82.9 (3.26) | 69.4 (2.73) | 47.1 (1.85) | 41.3 (1.63) | 33.6 (1.32) | 22.6 (0.89) | 550.6 (21.68) |
| Average rainfall mm (inches) | 0.1 (0.00) | 0.5 (0.02) | 0.3 (0.01) | 12.7 (0.50) | 52.7 (2.07) | 88.2 (3.47) | 82.9 (3.26) | 69.1 (2.72) | 43.4 (1.71) | 11.1 (0.44) | 0.6 (0.02) | 0.0 (0.0) | 361.6 (14.24) |
| Average snowfall cm (inches) | 23.0 (9.1) | 18.8 (7.4) | 26.8 (10.6) | 19.7 (7.8) | 11.0 (4.3) | 0.0 (0.0) | 0.0 (0.0) | 0.2 (0.1) | 3.7 (1.5) | 30.3 (11.9) | 33.0 (13.0) | 22.6 (8.9) | 189.0 (74.4) |
| Average precipitation days (≥ 0.2 mm) | 6.6 | 7.0 | 8.2 | 7.8 | 11.4 | 13.2 | 14.4 | 11.8 | 9.6 | 9.5 | 10.1 | 7.9 | 117.5 |
| Average rainy days (≥ 0.2 mm) | 0.1 | 0.2 | 0.5 | 4.4 | 10.9 | 13.2 | 14.4 | 11.8 | 9.4 | 4.1 | 0.2 | 0.0 | 69.0 |
| Average snowy days (≥ 0.2 cm) | 6.6 | 6.8 | 8.1 | 4.9 | 1.5 | 0.0 | 0.0 | 0.4 | 1.3 | 6.4 | 9.9 | 7.9 | 53.7 |

== Facilities ==
Wonowon offers overnight accommodation, a gas station, mobile home park, and parking lanes for long trucks. The thru-road Alaska Highway has been paved in the village area since 1982.

== See also ==
- List of places with numeric names
