= CKFU-FM =

Radio station in Fort St. John, British Columbia

Coordinates: 56°16′36″N 120°53′51″W

- Fort St. John, British Columbia; Canada
- Frequency: 100.1 MHz
- Branding: 100.1 Moose FM

Programming
- Format: Country

Ownership
- Owner: Adam Reaburn

History
- First air date: September 1, 2003

Technical information
- Class: LP
- ERP: vertical polarization only: 23 watts
- HAAT: 92 metres (302 ft)

Links
- Website: moosefm.ca

CKFU-FM, branded as 100.1 Moose FM, is a Canadian radio station, broadcasting in Fort St. John, British Columbia. The station is one of the few commercial low power FM (LPFM) stations operating in Canada.

The station launched in 2003, branded as Moose FM from its inauguration, originally playing a classic hits format; on March 12, 2009, the station flipped to a country music format, keeping the Moose brand.

Russ Wagg, on behalf of 669375 B. C. Ltd., received a broadcast approval from the CRTC on February 12, 2003, and the station launched on September 1, 2003 – branded as Moose FM from its inauguration.
