= Lake Charles =

Lake Charles may refer to:

== Canada ==
- Lake Charles (Nova Scotia), a lake in Halifax
- Lake Charles, in Guysborough County, a lake in Nova Scotia
- Lake Charles, Ontario, a community of Georgian Bluffs
- Lake Charles (Ontario), several lakes in Ontario

== United States ==
- Lake Charles, a reservoir in Illinois
- Lake Charles (Louisiana), a lake
- Lake Charles, Louisiana, a city
  - Lake Charles Air Force Station
  - Lake Charles Historic District
  - Lake Charles Regional Airport
  - Lake Charles station
- Lake Charles, a lake at Dodge City Community College, Kansas
- Lake Charles State Park, Arkansas

== See also ==
- Charlie Lake (disambiguation)
