= Charlie Lake, British Columbia =

Settlement in British Columbia, Canada

Coordinates: 56.292°N 121.006°W

Location of Charlie Lake in British Columbia

Charlie Lake is a settlement in British Columbia. It is established on the southern shore of Charlie Lake, immediately north-west from Fort St. John, along the Alaska Highway. The population of the community is 1,897 as of 2016.
