= Fort St. John Airport =

Airport in British Columbia, Canada

Fort St. John Airport North Peace Airport
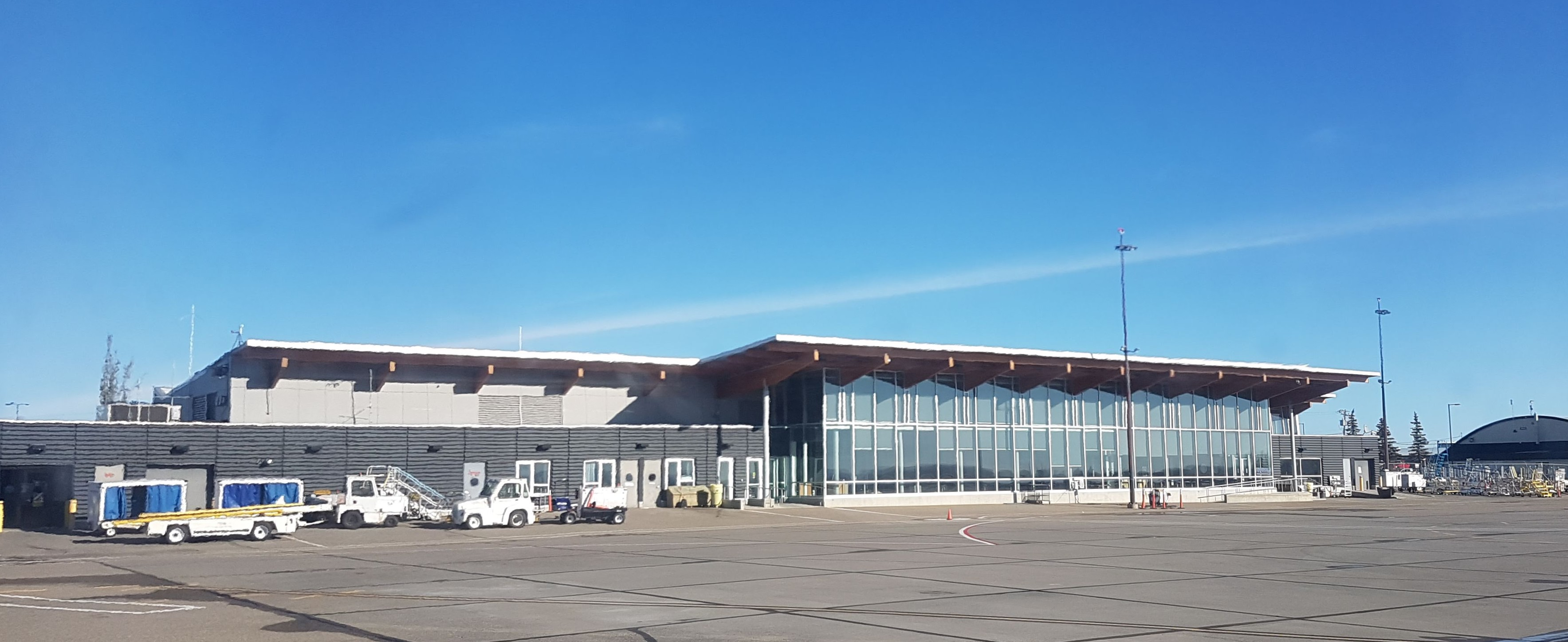
- Fort St. John Airport, BC
- IATA: YXJ; ICAO: CYXJ; WMO: 71943

Summary
- Airport type: Public
- Operator: North Peace Airport Services Ltd.
- Location: Fort St. John, British Columbia
- Time zone: MST (UTC−07:00)
- Elevation AMSL: 2,280 ft / 695 m
- Coordinates: 56°14′18″N 120°44′25″W
- Website: yxj.ca

Map
- Location in British Columbia

Runways
Direction	Length		Surface
Direction	ft	m	Surface
03/21	6,698	2,042	Asphalt
12/30	6,909	2,106	Asphalt

Statistics (2010)
- Aircraft movements: 28,939
- Sources: Canada Flight Supplement; Environment Canada; Movements from Statistics Canada

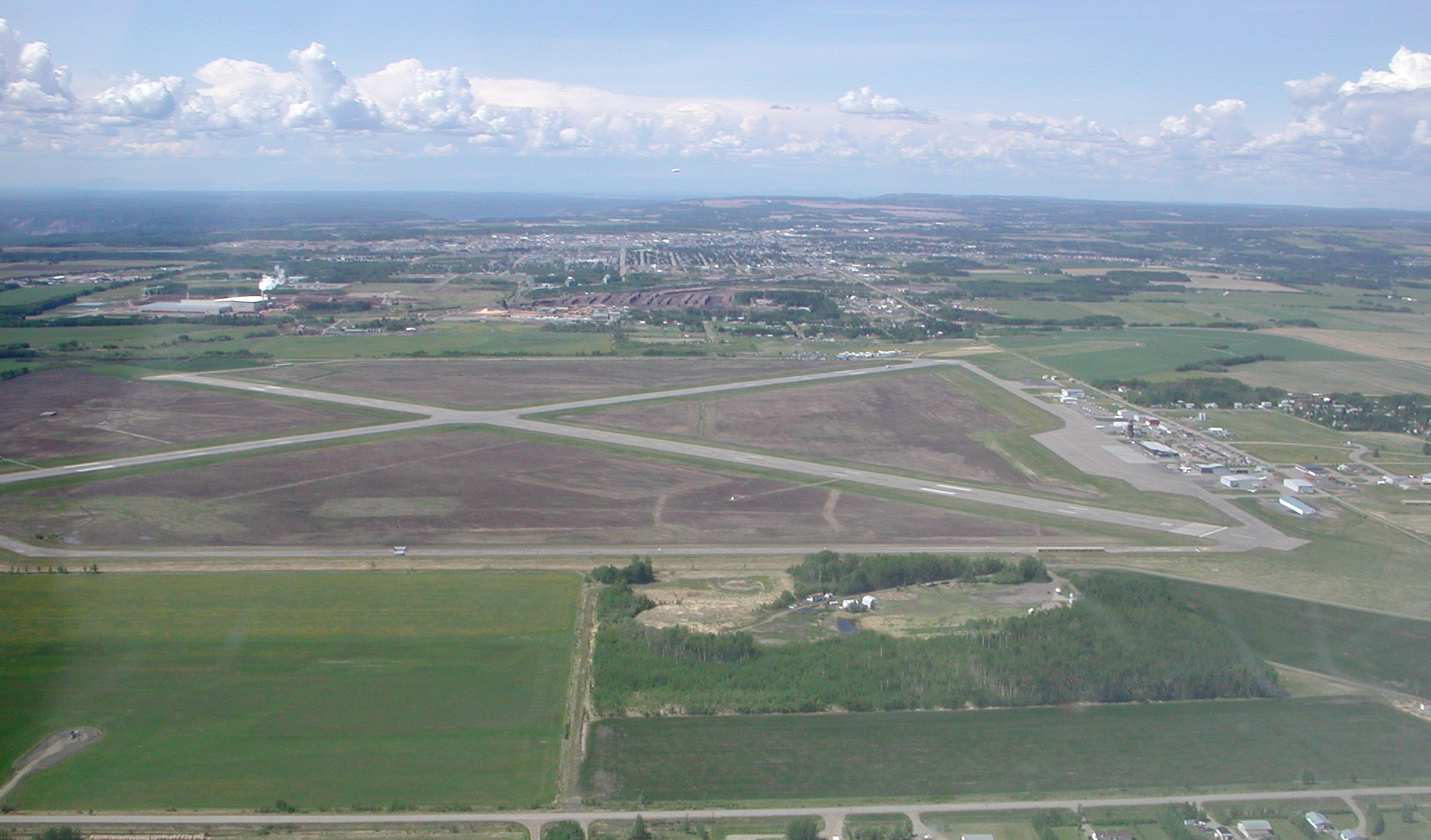
Fort St. John Airport, BC

Fort St. John Airport (IATA: YXJ, ICAO: CYXJ), North Peace Regional Airport, or North Peace Airport, is located at Fort St. John, British Columbia, Canada. The airport is operated by North Peace Airport Services Ltd (a subsidiary of Vantage Airport Group). A new record of 257,295 passengers came through the airport in 2015, up from the 252,729 passengers seen in 2014.

In 2013, WestJet Encore announced regular scheduled service to Calgary and Vancouver, representing a major expansion of airline service to the Fort St. John market. Scheduled service to Vancouver is also provided by Air Canada Express.

== Runways ==
Fort St. John Airport currently has two runways. Runway 12/30 is a 6,909 by 150 ft (2,106 by 46 m) paved runway, while runway 03/21 is a 6,698 by 200 ft (2,042 by 61 m) paved runway.

== Airlines and destinations ==
Airlines	Destinations
Air Canada Express	Vancouver
WestJet Encore	Calgary, Vancouver

== History ==
In approximately 1942 the aerodrome was listed as RCAF & D of T Aerodrome - Fort St. John, British Columbia at 56°14′N 120°44′W with a variation of 31 degrees east and elevation of 2,400 ft (730 m). The aerodrome was listed as "Under Construction - Servicable" with four runways listed as follows:

Runway name	Length	Width	Surface
2/20	5,600 ft (1,700 m)	200 ft (61 m)	Hard Surfaced
10/28	5,600 ft (1,700 m)	200 ft (61 m)	Hard Surfaced
6/24	4,200 ft (1,300 m)	200 ft (61 m)	Hard Surfaced
15/33	4,000 ft (1,200 m)	150 ft (46 m)	Hard Surfaced

=== Historical airline service ===
Commencing in the early 1940s, Canadian Pacific Air Lines and its successors CP Air and Canadian Airlines International operated scheduled passenger service to Vancouver, British Columbia; Edmonton, Alberta; Prince George, British Columbia; Whitehorse, Yukon; Fort Nelson, British Columbia; Grande Prairie, Alberta and Watson Lake, Yukon. CP Air served the airport with Boeing 737-200 jetliners during the 1970s with direct, no change of plane flights to all of the above destinations. Other Canadian Pacific flights into the airport over the years were operated with such twin engine prop aircraft as the Lockheed Lodestar, the Douglas DC-3 and the Convair 240 as well as with the larger, four engine Douglas DC-6B propliner and Bristol Britannia turboprop. In 1994, Canadian Partner code sharing service on behalf of Canadian Airlines International was being operated with de Havilland Canada DHC-8 Dash 8 turboprops and/or Fokker F28 Fellowship jets to the airport from Vancouver, Edmonton, Grande Prairie and Fort Nelson.

== See also ==
- Fort St. John (Charlie Lake) Water Aerodrome
- Fort St. John/Tompkins Mile 54 Airport
