= Fort St. John, British Columbia =

City in British Columbia

Fort St. John
- City
- City of Fort St. John
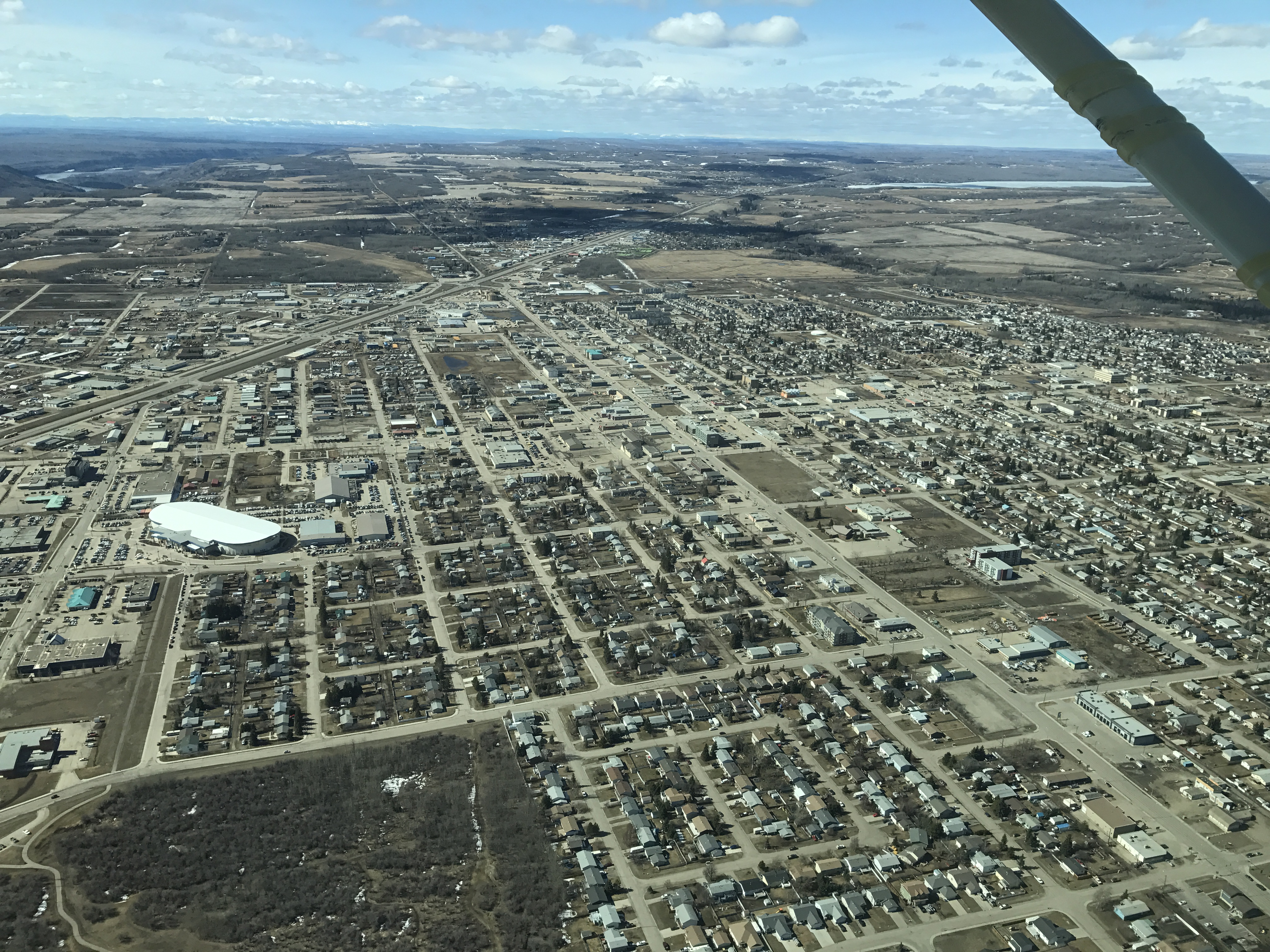
- Aerial view of the city

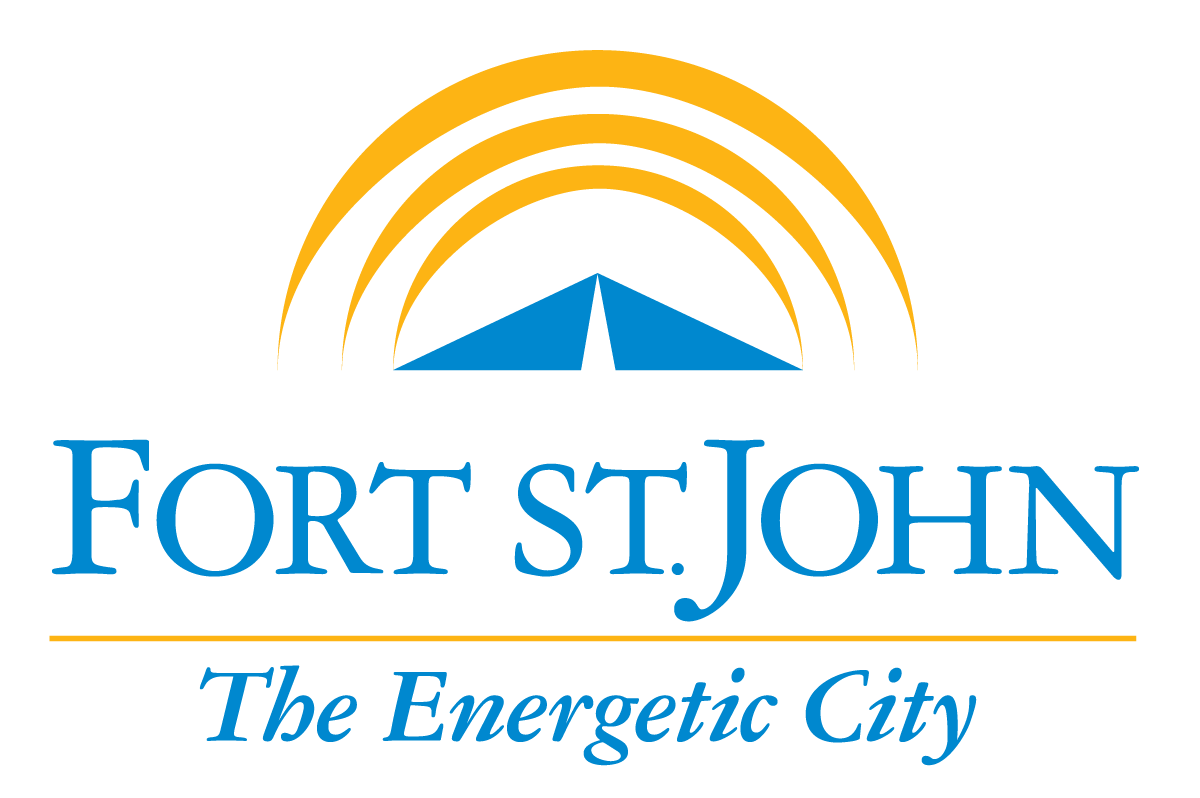
- Flag Logo
- Nickname: FSJ
- Motto: The Energetic City
- Location of Fort St. John Fort St. John (Canada) Fort St. John (North America)
- Coordinates: 56°15′09″N 120°50′48″W
- Country: Canada
- Province: British Columbia
- Regional District: Peace River
- Incorporated: 31 Dec 1947 (village)

Government
  - Mayor: Lilia Hansen
  - Governing Body: Fort St. John City Council (Byron Stewart, Gord Klassen, Trevor Bolin, Tony Zabinsky, Sarah MacDougall, Jim Lequiere)
  - MLA: Jordan Kealy, Independent
  - MP: Bob Zimmer, Conservative

Area
  - City: 22.69 km^{2} (8.76 sq mi)
  - Metro: 620.80 km^{2} (239.69 sq mi)
- Elevation: 690 m (2,260 ft)

Population (2020)
  - City: 22,283
  - Density: 820.2/km^{2} (2,124/sq mi)
  - Metro: 28,396
  - Metro density: 42.5/km^{2} (110/sq mi)
- Time zone: UTC−07:00 (MST)
- Forward sortation area: V1J
- Area codes: 250, 778, 236, 672
- Website: fortstjohn.ca

Fort St. John is a city located in northeastern British Columbia, Canada. The most populous municipality in the Peace River Regional District, the city encompasses a total area of about 22 km^{2} (8.5 sq mi) with 21,465 residents recorded in the 2021 Census. Located at Mile 47 of the Alaska Highway, it is one of the largest cities between Dawson Creek, British Columbia and Delta Junction, Alaska. Established in 1794 as a trading post, Fort St. John is the oldest European-established settlement in present-day British Columbia. The city is served by the Fort St. John Airport. The municipal slogan is Fort St. John: The Energetic City.

== History ==
The first trading post built in the area was named Rocky Mountain Fort. It was south of Fort St. John, having been established by North West Company traders one year after Sir Alexander Mackenzie explored the area in 1793. The fort closed c. 1805, and Fort St. John's was established a year later. On March 26, 1821, the North West Company merged with the Hudson's Bay Company, changing ownership of Fort St John's. It operated until 1823, when a band of disgruntled Northern Athabaskans killed several Hudson's Bay Company employees. According to historian Shepard Krech III, the incident represented an "impromptu reaction to inflexible trading policies of the [Hudson's Bay] Company." After a lapse of 37 years, Fort St. John was reopened in 1860. The site was designated a National Historic Site of Canada in 1958.

Frank Worth Beaton moved Fort St. John to Fish Creek in 1925, 1.6 kilometres (1 mile) northwest of the current city. During World War II, the town was used as a station for the 341st General Service Regiment, which was assigned to build the Alaska Highway to Fort Nelson. The population of Fort St. John grew to a few thousand people, then after the Alaska Highway was completed, the population fell. The first census that recognized Fort St. John as a census subdivision took place in 1951 and recorded 884 people. The population rapidly increased, because of the booming oil and gas industry, doubling almost every 5 years for 15 years so that by 1966 there were 6,749 residents living in the community. In May 1971, Elizabeth II and Prince Philip, Duke of Edinburgh visited Fort St. John. They were greeted by an estimated 4,000 people.

== Geography ==
Fort St. John is geographically on the western edge of the Canadian prairies that cover much of Alberta, Saskatchewan, and Manitoba, but is not politically included in the three Canadian Prairie provinces. The city sits between the Peace River and Beatton River, with Charlie Lake nearby.

Sitting at an elevation of 690 m (2,260 ft), Fort St. John is situated within a low-lying valley near the eastern foothills of the Muskwa Ranges and Hart Ranges of the Northern Rockies. Prairies lie to the east and north, while to the west the Rocky Mountains form a rain shadow. The city is built on relatively flat, rolling hills.

Fort St. John, along with neighboring cities of Chetwynd, Tumbler Ridge, and Dawson Creek, are within Peace River Country, a large geographic area of British Columbia and Alberta. The Peace River valley provides opportunities for farming, in contrast to the rugged mountains to the west.

=== Climate ===
Fort St. John experiences a cold humid continental climate (Köppen: Dfb) closely bordering on a subarctic climate (Dfc), with cold winters and warm summers. Although winters can be frigid, the area has milder winters than much of the rest of Canada (especially considering its northerly latitude) due to the influence of the nearby Rocky Mountains. They tend to block arctic air masses coming in from the north/northwest, although they can still penetrate the area. A predominantly southwesterly wind blows through town, with wind speeds averaging around 14.0 km/h (8.7 mph). Fort St. John uses Mountain Standard Time all year (same as Pacific Daylight Time in summer), and because of its northerly latitude experiences short daylight hours in winter and long daylight hours in summer.

Fort St. John is east of the Rocky Mountains, and thus has a climate much more similar to the prairies than the British Columbia interior west of the mountains. The frost-free period is much longer east of the mountains than west, and thus the Peace River area including Fort St. John can grow crops that cannot be grown in most of the province such as wheat and canola.

Fort St. John is one of the sunniest places in the province, especially in the winter and spring. The city holds British Columbia's record for most sunshine ever recorded in March (247.4 hours in 1965), May (373.5 hours in 1972), and November (141.3 hours in 1976).

The coldest temperature ever recorded was −53.9 °C (−65.0 °F) on 11 January 1911. The highest temperature ever recorded in Fort St. John was 38.3 °C (100.9 °F) on 16 July 1941. The record high daily minimum was 20.9 °C (69.6 °F) recorded 29 June 2021. The record highest dew point was 22.2 °C (72.0 °F) recorded 31 July 1960. The most humid month was August 2013 with an average dew point of 11.5 °C (52.7 °F). The warmest month was July 2024 with an average monthly mean temperature of 19.2 °C (66.6 °F), an average monthly daily maximum of 25.4 °C (77.7 °F), and an average monthly daily minimum of 13.1 °C (55.6 °F). July 2015 set a record of no maximum temperature below 18.4 °C (65.1 °F) for the entire month; August 2022 with no temperature below C, and August 1954 with no dew point below 5.6 °C (42.1 °F).

The lowest yearly maximum dew point is 13.8 °C (56.8 °F) recorded in 1985. The lowest yearly maximum daily minimum temperature is 12.8 °C (55.0 °F) recorded in 1957. The lowest yearly maximum temperature is 25.0 °C (77.0 °F) recorded in 1976.

The average yearly maximum dew point is 16.4 °C (61.5 °F) and the average yearly maximum daily minimum temperature is 16.3 °C (61.3 °F).

Fort St. John

Climate chart (precipitation, max. and min. temperature)
J	F	M	A	M	J	J	A	S	O	N	D
28 −9 −17	21 −5 −14	27 −1 −10	21 9 −2	34 16 4	75 20 9	77 22 11	48 21 9	42 16 5	33 8 −1	35 −2 −10	24 −7 −15
- █ Average max. and min. temperatures in °C
- █ Precipitation totals in mm
- Source: Environment Canada
Imperial conversion
J	F	M	A	M	J	J	A	S	O	N	D
1.1 17 2	0.8 22 7	1 31 14	0.8 48 29	1.3 61 40	2.9 67 48	3 71 51	1.9 69 49	1.7 60 41	1.3 46 31	1.4 28 15	0.9 20 6
- █ Average max. and min. temperatures in °F
- █ Precipitation totals in inches

Climate data for Fort St. John (Fort St. John Airport) WMO ID: 71943; coordinates 56°14′17″N 120°44′25″W; elevation: 694.9 m (2,280 ft); 1991–2020 normals (sun 1981–2010), extremes 1910–present (Note: Climate data was recorded in the city of Fort St. John from January 1910 to February 1945, and at Fort St. John Airport from March 1942 to present.)
Month	Jan	Feb	Mar	Apr	May	Jun	Jul	Aug	Sep	Oct	Nov	Dec	Year
Record high humidex	12.7	12.4	17.3	28.5	31.5	34.3	37.4	34.5	32.6	25.4	16.2	11.2	37.4
Record high °C (°F)	12.9 (55.2)	12.8 (55.0)	19.7 (67.5)	27.9 (82.2)	31.8 (89.2)	38.1 (100.6)	38.3 (100.9)	33.6 (92.5)	30.0 (86.0)	25.8 (78.4)	18.3 (64.9)	11.4 (52.5)	38.3 (100.9)
Mean maximum °C (°F)	6.6 (43.9)	7.1 (44.8)	10.2 (50.4)	18.4 (65.1)	24.8 (76.6)	26.6 (79.9)	28.6 (83.5)	28.1 (82.6)	24.4 (75.9)	18.2 (64.8)	7.9 (46.2)	5.4 (41.7)	29.9 (85.8)
Mean daily maximum °C (°F)	−8.6 (16.5)	−5.4 (22.3)	−0.5 (31.1)	9.1 (48.4)	16.0 (60.8)	19.7 (67.5)	21.7 (71.1)	20.8 (69.4)	15.7 (60.3)	7.7 (45.9)	−2.4 (27.7)	−6.9 (19.6)	7.2 (45.0)
Daily mean °C (°F)	−12.7 (9.1)	−9.7 (14.5)	−5.2 (22.6)	3.8 (38.8)	10.1 (50.2)	14.2 (57.6)	16.3 (61.3)	15.0 (59.0)	10.4 (50.7)	3.5 (38.3)	−6.1 (21.0)	−10.8 (12.6)	2.4 (36.3)
Mean daily minimum °C (°F)	−16.7 (1.9)	−14.0 (6.8)	−9.8 (14.4)	−1.5 (29.3)	4.2 (39.6)	8.7 (47.7)	10.7 (51.3)	9.3 (48.7)	5.1 (41.2)	−0.7 (30.7)	−9.7 (14.5)	−14.6 (5.7)	−2.4 (27.7)
Mean minimum °C (°F)	−32.5 (−26.5)	−26.5 (−15.7)	−24.7 (−12.5)	−11.5 (11.3)	−2.9 (26.8)	3.5 (38.3)	5.9 (42.6)	2.8 (37.0)	−2.6 (27.3)	−10.3 (13.5)	−22.4 (−8.3)	−28.8 (−19.8)	−35.8 (−32.4)
Record low °C (°F)	−53.9 (−65.0)	−42.2 (−44.0)	−36.7 (−34.1)	−28.9 (−20.0)	−13.1 (8.4)	−1.0 (30.2)	0.7 (33.3)	−2.9 (26.8)	−12.8 (9.0)	−25.0 (−13.0)	−39.2 (−38.6)	−44.6 (−48.3)	−53.9 (−65.0)
Record low wind chill	−59.5	−59.3	−48.7	−37.8	−19.9	−6.2	0.0	−7.8	−18.4	−35.3	−58.3	−53.9	−59.5
Average precipitation mm (inches)	28.4 (1.12)	20.7 (0.81)	26.6 (1.05)	20.6 (0.81)	34.1 (1.34)	74.9 (2.95)	76.5 (3.01)	47.8 (1.88)	42.3 (1.67)	33.4 (1.31)	34.7 (1.37)	23.6 (0.93)	463.6 (18.25)
Average rainfall mm (inches)	0.7 (0.03)	0.6 (0.02)	0.8 (0.03)	8.7 (0.34)	27.6 (1.09)	74.6 (2.94)	76.5 (3.01)	47.8 (1.88)	37.6 (1.48)	12.8 (0.50)	4.2 (0.17)	0.4 (0.02)	292.3 (11.51)
Average snowfall cm (inches)	34.4 (13.5)	26.3 (10.4)	30.0 (11.8)	14.5 (5.7)	6.8 (2.7)	0.3 (0.1)	0.0 (0.0)	0.0 (0.0)	4.9 (1.9)	22.2 (8.7)	37.6 (14.8)	29.0 (11.4)	205.9 (81.1)
Average precipitation days (≥ 0.2 mm)	11.8	8.4	9.3	6.7	8.9	12.3	12.5	10.3	10.0	9.5	11.5	9.1	120.3
Average rainy days (≥ 0.2 mm)	0.92	0.5	0.75	3.8	7.9	12.3	12.5	10.3	9.7	5.0	2.6	0.43	66.6
Average snowy days (≥ 0.2 cm)	11.7	8.7	8.8	3.7	1.7	0.0	0.0	0.0	0.8	5.6	10.3	9.2	60.4
Average relative humidity (%) (at 15:00 LST)	69.0	62.8	54.2	42.9	39.9	47.1	49.7	49.3	51.3	58.5	72.1	71.9	55.7
Average dew point °C (°F)	−16.8 (1.8)	−14.3 (6.3)	−11.5 (11.3)	−5.2 (22.6)	−0.1 (31.8)	5.9 (42.6)	8.8 (47.8)	7.9 (46.2)	3.6 (38.5)	−2.4 (27.7)	−9.8 (14.4)	−15.0 (5.0)	−4.1 (24.6)
Mean monthly sunshine hours	74.3	106.4	175.0	223.4	267.7	266.5	287.4	260.0	177.7	134.7	70.5	51.8	2,095.4
Percentage possible sunshine	31.5	39.4	47.8	52.5	52.9	50.6	54.5	55.5	46.3	41.6	28.4	23.8	43.7
Source 1: Environment and Climate Change Canada (sun) (January minimum) (March maximum) (April maximum) (June maximum) (July maximum)
Source 2: weatherstats.ca (for dewpoint and monthly/yearly average absolute maximum/minimum temperature)

== Demographics ==
Historical populations
Year	Pop.	±%
2001	16,051	—
2006	17,402	+8.4%
2011	18,609	+6.9%
2016	20,155	+8.3%

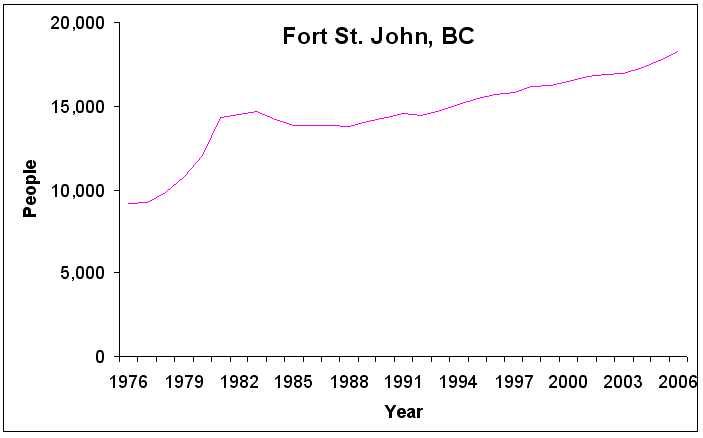
Population of Fort St. John, 1976–2006

In the 2021 Census of Population conducted by Statistics Canada, Fort St. John had a population of 21,465 living in 8,777 of its 10,004 total private dwellings, a change of 5.9% from its 2016 population of 20,260. With a land area of 32.67 km^{2} (12.61 sq mi), it had a population density of 657.0/km^{2} (1,701.7/sq mi) in 2021.

Canada 2001 Census
	Fort St. John	British Columbia
Median age	32.0 years	38.4 years
Under 15 years old	22.1%	18%
Between 25 and 44 years old	33.4%	30%
Over 65 years old	6.7%	14%
Visible minority	3%	21%
Protestant	38%	31%

=== Ethnicity ===
Panethnic groups in the City of Fort St. John (1996−2021)
Panethnic group	2021		2016		2011		2006		2001		1996	
Panethnic group	Pop.	%	Pop.	%	Pop.	%	Pop.	%	Pop.	%	Pop.	%
European (Note: Statistic includes all persons that did not make up part of a visible minority or an indigenous identity.)	14,970	70.7%	15,195	76.7%	15,395	83.44%	14,990	86.65%	13,695	85.94%	13,405	89.85%
Indigenous	2,770	13.08%	2,240	11.31%	2,120	11.49%	1,645	9.51%	1,780	11.17%	1,030	6.9%
Southeast Asian (Note: Statistic includes total responses of "Filipino" and "Southeast Asian" under visible minority section on census.)	1,225	5.79%	725	3.66%	290	1.57%	115	0.66%	130	0.82%	95	0.64%
South Asian	1,120	5.29%	595	3%	160	0.87%	150	0.87%	45	0.28%	80	0.54%
African	435	2.05%	375	1.89%	140	0.76%	100	0.58%	90	0.56%	50	0.34%
East Asian (Note: Statistic includes total responses of "Chinese", "Korean", and "Japanese" under visible minority section on census.)	325	1.53%	370	1.87%	275	1.49%	215	1.24%	130	0.82%	190	1.27%
Latin American	85	0.4%	90	0.45%	0	0%	50	0.29%	10	0.06%	0	0%
Middle Eastern (Note: Statistic includes total responses of "West Asian" and "Arab" under visible minority section on census.)	50	0.24%	120	0.61%	35	0.19%	20	0.12%	20	0.13%	10	0.07%
Other/multiracial (Note: Statistic includes total responses of "Visible minority, n.i.e." and "Multiple visible minorities" under visible minority section on census.)	190	0.9%	90	0.45%	35	0.19%	20	0.12%	30	0.19%	60	0.4%
Total responses	21,175	98.65%	19,810	98.29%	18,450	99.15%	17,300	99.41%	15,935	99.38%	14,920	99.33%
Total population	21,465	100%	20,155	100%	18,609	100%	17,402	100%	16,034	100%	15,021	100%
Note: Totals greater than 100% due to multiple origin responses.

=== Religion ===
According to the 2021 census, religious groups in Fort St. John included:

- Irreligion (12,170 persons or 57.5%)
- Christianity (7,685 persons or 36.3%)
- Sikhism (490 persons or 2.3%)
- Hinduism (290 persons or 1.4%)
- Islam (250 persons or 1.2%)
- Indigenous Spirituality (60 persons or 0.3%)
- Buddhism (50 persons or 0.2%)
- Judaism (20 persons or 0.1%)

== Economy ==
Economy
Rate	Town	Province
Unemployment rate	3%	8.5%
Participation rate	77.9%	65.2%
Poverty rate	6.7%	17.8%
Average male income	$54,252	$50,191
Average female income	$31,083	$35,895

As the urban centre for a rural and farming population of about 8,306 people and home to 18,609 people, Fort St. John is a retail, service and industrial centre. The province's oil and gas industry, including the provincial Oil and Gas Commission is centred in the city. Forestry has become more important to the city since the opening of an oriented strand board plant in 2005. Much wood is exported to the United States.

Fort St. John is a transportation hub and industrial centre serving BC Hydro's nearby hydro-electric facilities, the W.A.C. Bennett Dam, Peace Canyon Dam and Site C dam.

The 2001 Canadian census recorded 9,985 income-earners over the age of 15 residing in Fort St. John; of these, 4,500 worked full-time throughout the year. The high participation rate stems from the relatively young population, much of which was attracted by the area's high-paying oil and gas industry. Its male-female income gap is large.

== Health ==
In 1963, Fort St. John became the tenth community in British Columbia to add fluoride to its water supply. Fort St. John has a hospital, which as of 2022, had 44 in-patient beds, four intensive care unit beds, and seven delivery beds. It has a CT scanner and ultrasound.

== Arts and culture ==
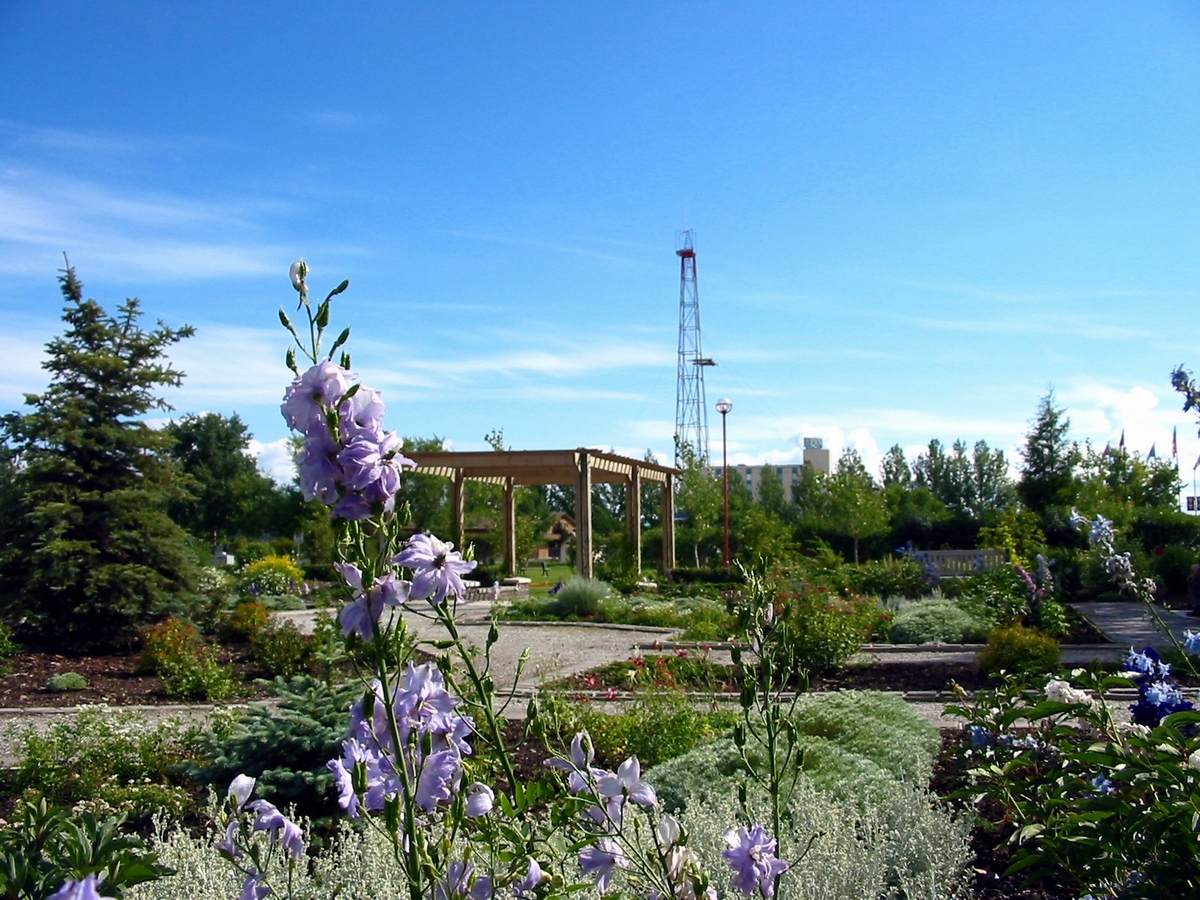
Park in Fort St. John

As the urban centre for approximately 20,000 people, much of the region's recreational and cultural facilities are located in town. Within the city, Centennial Park groups much of these facilities in a central location close to residences and businesses. This large park includes the Fort St. John North Peace Museum, the North Peace Leisure Pool, the North Peace Arena (home of the Fort St. John Huskies), a separate arena for children, an eight-sheet curling rink, as well as an outdoor water park and speed skating oval. Other parks in the area include the city-maintained Fish Creek Community Forest, and about 10 km (6.2 mi) northwest of town the Beatton Provincial Park and Charlie Lake Provincial Park. In the centre of town is the North Peace Cultural Centre which houses the Fort St. John Public Library, a theatre, and the Peace Gallery North art gallery.

== Attractions ==
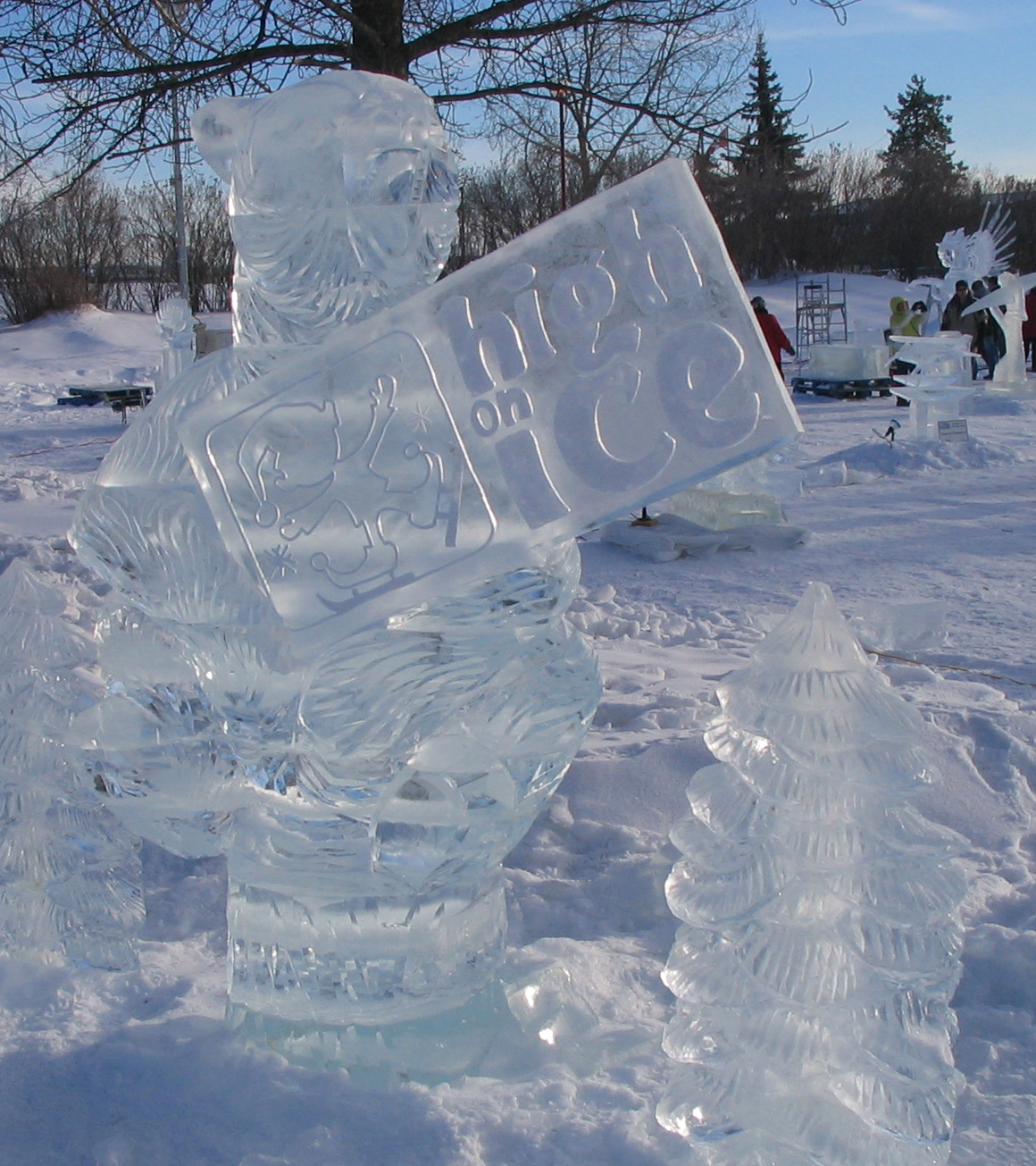
High on Ice Winter Carnival, January 2007

The city's main recreation centre is the Co-op Community Centre, previously known as the Pomeroy Sport Centre, that opened in 2010. It is a three-storey public facility with two National Hockey League-sized ice rinks, a concession, 12 dressing rooms, public meeting rooms, a retail juice outlet, an indoor near-Olympic-sized long track speed skating oval, and a 340 meter long walking track (the "Northern Vac Track"). All ice surfaces can be removed to provide event space in excess of 140,000 square feet. The facility also houses the Energetic Learning Campus, a satellite campus of the nearby North Peace Secondary School.

Fort St. John hosted the BC Winter Games in 1984 and 2020, and the Northern BC Winter Games in 1975, 1976, 1994, 2000, and 2007. Previously, the Great Canadian Welding Competition is held in Fort St. John, which sees welding artists fill Centennial Park creating statues on the year's given theme. In February, the annual Winter Fest has a frozen Centennial Park filled with ice sculptures, ice slides, and other special winter-related activities occurring around town.

== Government ==
The City of Fort St. John has a council-manager form of municipal government. A six-member council, along with one mayor, is elected at-large every four years. In the 2022 local government general election, Lilia Hansen was elected mayor, replacing Lori Ackerman, who had served since 2011. The mayor and one city councillor represent Fort St. John on the board of directors of the Peace River Regional District. Seven board of education trustees, for representation on School District 60 Peace River North, are also elected by residents.

Fort St. John is situated in the Peace River North provincial electoral district and is represented by Jordan Kealy in the Legislative Assembly of British Columbia. Replacing Pat Pimm who replaced long-time MLA Richard Neufeld who was first elected as a Member of the Legislative Assembly in the 1991 provincial election with the BC Social Credit Party taking 56% of votes cast at the Fort St. John polls and re-elected with Reform BC in 1996 with 44% support, and with the BC Liberal Party in 2001 and 2005 with 73% and 59% of Fort St. John polls, respectively. He has served as the minister of Energy, Mines and Petroleum Resources since 2001.

Federally, Fort St. John is located in the Prince George—Peace River riding, which is represented in the House of Commons by Conservative Party Member of Parliament Bob Zimmer, a former high school teacher who lives in Fort St. John. Prior to Zimmer, the riding had been represented by long-time MP Jay Hill, who was born and raised in Fort St. John, and first elected in 1993 and subsequently re-elected in 1997, 2000, and 2004 with 74%, 77%, and 70% support from Fort St. John polls, respectively. Hill was also re-elected in the 2006 and 2008 federal elections. Hill had served as the Government House Leader and was formerly the Secretary of State and Chief Government Whip, as well as the Whip of the Canadian Alliance Party. Before Hill the riding was represented, from 1972 to 1993, by Frank Oberle of the Progressive Conservative Party who served as minister of State for Science and Technology from 1985 to 1989 and minister of Forestry from 1990 to 1993.

Canadian federal election 2011: Fort St. John polls in Prince George—Peace River
Party	Candidate	Votes	city %	riding %
Conservative	Bob Zimmer	3,974	70%	62%
New Democratic	Lois Boone	1,082	19%	26%
Green	Hilary Crowley	288	5.1%	6.0%
Liberal	Ben Levine	242	4.3%	5.2%
Pirate	Jeremy Cote	88	1.6%	1.1%
Turnout		5,674	45%	54%

B.C. election 2009: Fort St. John polls in Peace River North
Party	Candidate	Votes	city %	riding %
Liberal	Pat Pimm	1,227	46%	43%
Independent	Arthur Hadland	763	29%	31%
New Democratic	Jackie Allen	359	14%	14%
Green	Liz Logan	271	10%	11%
Refederation	Suzanne Arntson	22	0.8%	0.6%
Turnout		2,642	25%	40%

=== Police ===
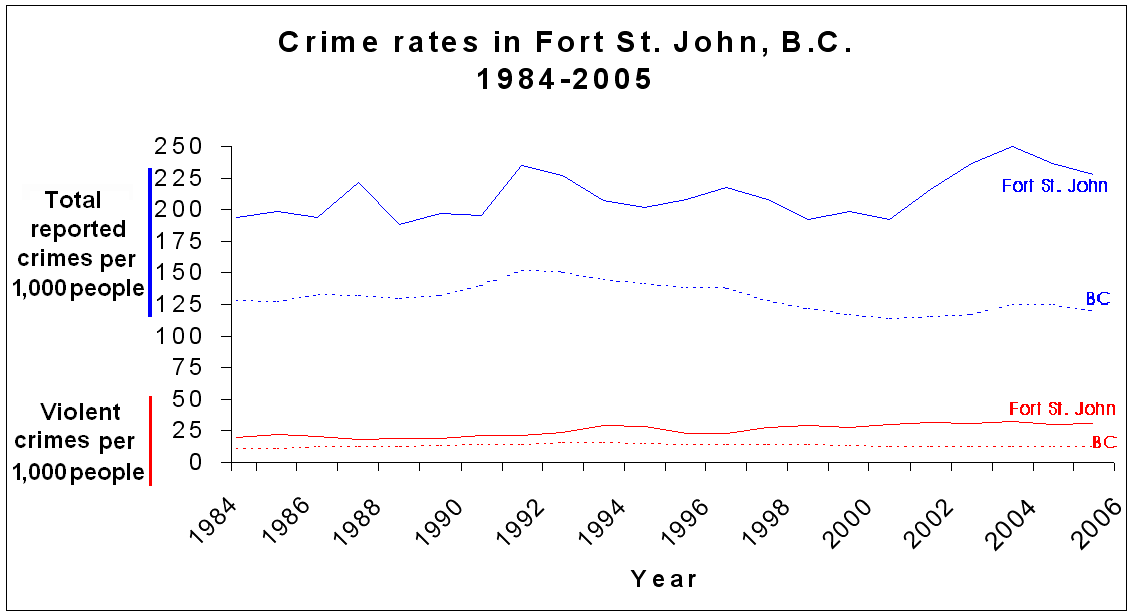
Crime rate in Fort St. John, 1984–2005

Police protection is contracted to the Royal Canadian Mounted Police which operates a 26 officer municipal detachment and a 10-member rural detachment from the city. In 2005, the municipal detachment reported 4,048 Criminal Code offences, which translates into a crime rate of 228 offences per 1,000 people, much higher than the provincial average of 125 offences. During that year, compared to the provincial average, the RCMP reported much higher crime rates in Fort St. John for cocaine, cannabis, non-sexual assaults, property damage, and arson related offences. However, the city had lower crime rates for robbery, theft from motor vehicles, and business break-and-enters.

== Infrastructure ==
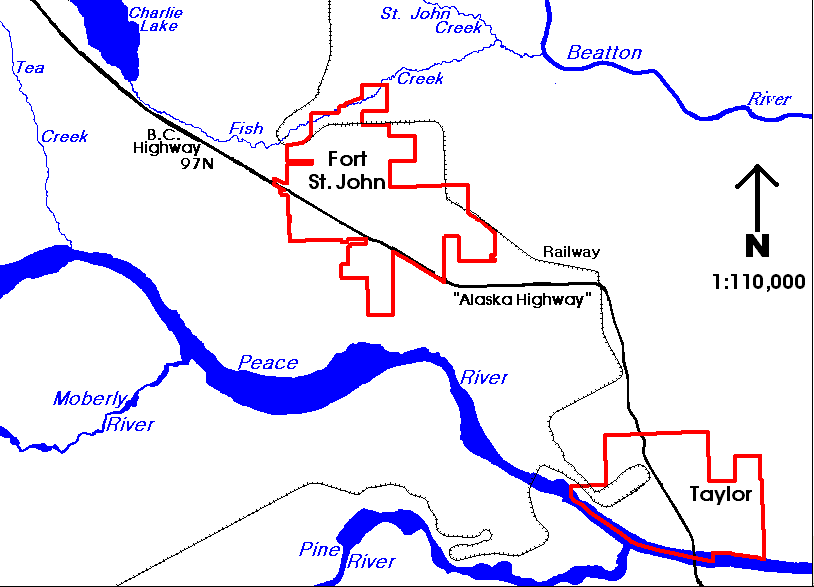
Creeks, rivers and transportation infrastructure around the city

Fort St. John is the transportation hub of the region. The main highway, Highway 97 (Alaska Highway), built in 1942 by the United States Army, runs through the city, north to Fort Nelson, the Yukon, and Alaska. Within the city the streets are laid out in a grid pattern. The main streets are the north–south 100 Street and the east–west 100 Avenue. The rail line that runs by the eastern and northern borders was extended from Chetwynd by the Pacific Great Eastern Railway with the first train arriving in 1958. The only commercial airport between Dawson Creek and Fort Nelson is the Fort St. John Airport (CYXJ) located a few miles east of the city. The two runway airport has Air Canada Jazz, WestJet and other smaller airlines such as Central Mountain Air and Swanberg Air with regularly scheduled flights and North Cariboo Air providing chartered flights. Greyhound Bus lines, which had a bus stop in the city, operated a route along the highway, north to Whitehorse (via Fort Nelson) and south to Dawson Creek, until the company stopped operations in Western Canada in 2018. BC Bus North provides bus service to Dawson Creek, Prince George, and Fort Nelson.

The city's water and sewer infrastructure pumps water from four deep wells located near the Peace River with a backup source being Charlie Lake; it is filtered, chlorinated and fluoridated before being distributed. The water has been rated by the BC Ministry of Environment as being "Very hard." Sewage is processed in one of two lagoons. The lagoon south of the city releases the processed effluent into the Peace River and the lagoon north of the city releases into the Beatton River. Storm sewers run with the sanitary sewers but storm discharge is directed into the rivers without going through the lagoons. The city's fire department consists of volunteer and professional members, covering the city plus five miles (8 km) into the rural areas.

== Education ==
There are nine public schools within the city limits, with one being a secondary school, and another 10 outside of Fort St. John that are all administered by School District 60 Peace River North. There is one private Christian school in Fort St. John, also administered by School District 60 Peace River North. Northern Lights College has a campus in Fort St. John housing the B.C. Centre of Training Excellence in Oil and Gas, which includes a full-sized oil rig and simulated well site. The 2001 Census estimated that 10% of people in Fort St. John between 20 and 64 years old graduated from a university, less than half of the 24% provincial average and 27% did not graduate from secondary school, 7% higher than the provincial average. A survey released in 2023 showed that the C. M. Finch School had the highest academic performance in Fort St. John, with an overall rating of 7.5 out of ten for the 2021/2022 school year and an overall rating of 7.4 out of ten in the past five years. The same survey showed that the Margaret Ma Murray Community School had the lowest academic performance in Fort St. John, with an overall rating of 4.2 out of ten for the 2021/2022 school year.

== Media ==
The Alaska Highway News is published in Fort St. John. The EnergeticCity.ca website is a digital news outlet focused on local news in and around Fort St. John; it is owned by 0914126 B.C. Ltd., which is controlled 100% by Adam Reaburn, owner of local radio station CKFU-FM.

Radio stations broadcasting from Fort St. John include 98.5 GO FM (CHRX-FM) (Adult contemporary), 101.5 FM The Goat(CKNL-FM) (Rock), 92.5 Sunrise FM (CIAM-FM) (Religious) and the aforementioned country music station 100.1 Moose FM (CKFU-FM).
