= John Horgan Dam =

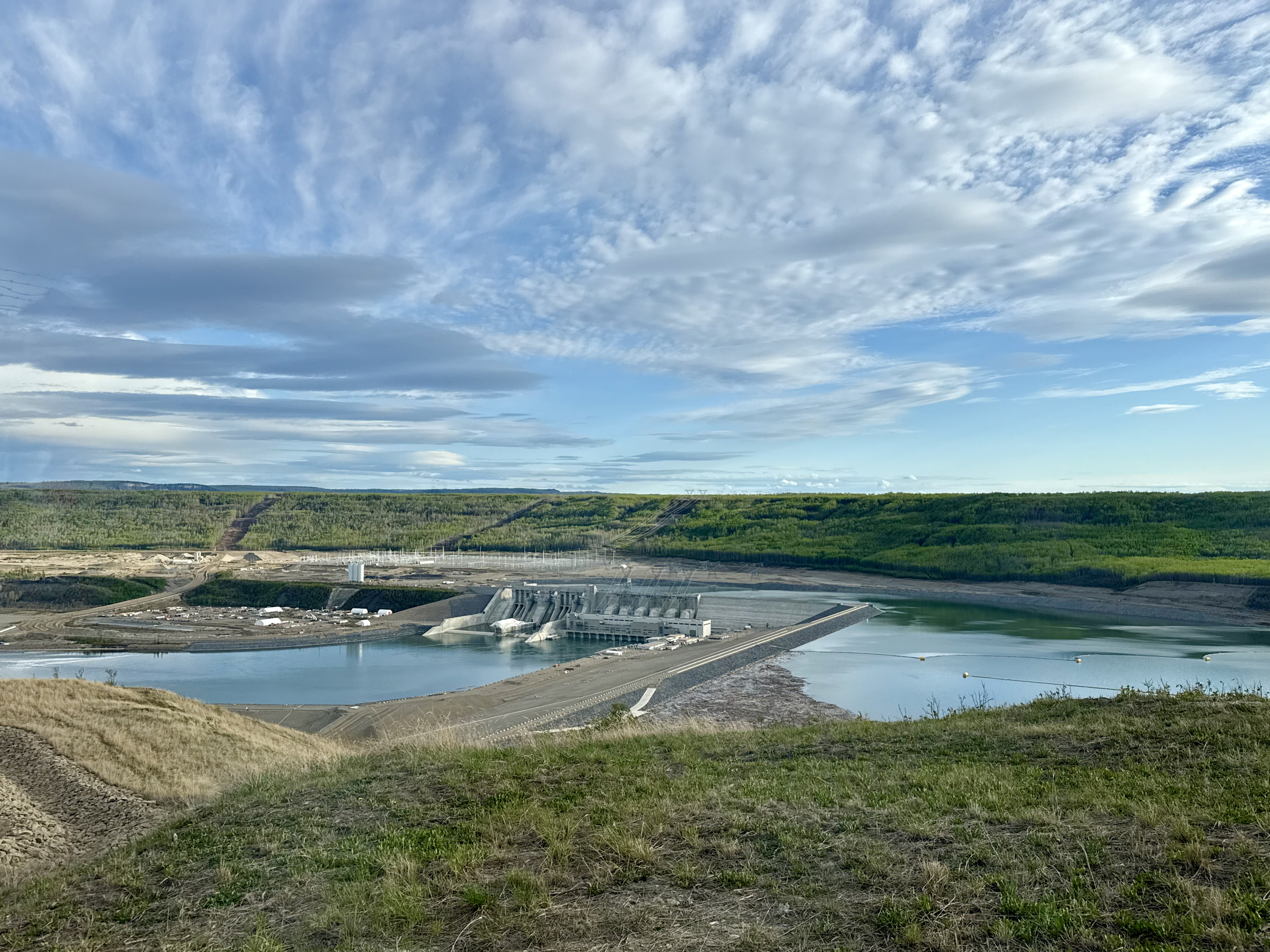
- Dam construction as of May 2025

- Location within British Columbia
- Official name: John Horgan Dam and Generating Station
- Location: Peace River Regional District, British Columbia, Canada
- Coordinates: 56°11′41″N 120°54′51″W
- Status: Operational
- Construction began: 2015
- Opening date: 2025
- Construction cost: C$16 billion, February 2021 estimate
- Owner: BC Hydro

Dam and spillways
- Type of dam: Earth fill
- Impounds: Peace River
- Height: 60 m (200 ft)
- Length: 1,050 m (3,440 ft)

Reservoir
- Creates: Náaché mege reservoir
- Surface area: 9,330 ha (23,100 acres)

Power Station
- Installed capacity: 1,100 MW
- Annual generation: 5,100 GWh

The John Horgan Dam and Generating Station (formerly known as the Site C Dam) is a hydroelectric dam on the Peace River, 14 kilometres southwest of Fort St. John in northeastern British Columbia, Canada. It is located approximately 80 kilometres downstream from the W. A. C. Bennett Dam.

It is the fourth largest producer of hydroelectricity in British Columbia. Its six generating units have an installed capacity of 1,100-1,230 MW and an annual output of approxmiately 5,100 GWh of electricity.

The dam created the Site C reservoir, named Nááchę mege (pronounced nah chay meegeh), which translates to Dreamer Lake. There are two public boat launches on Nááchę mege, at Lynx Creek and Halfway River, as well as a floating dock installed at the D.A. Thomas Recreation Area. A publicly accessible viewpoint is located immediately west of the Fort St. John, on the south side of Highway 97.

The project was controversial, and drew substantial opposition from several quarters due to its planned flooding of agricultural land, damage to the local environment, high construction cost, possible alternatives, and the uncertainty of future electricity prices and demand in the province. Two Treaty 8 First Nations and local landowners made legal challenges to the dam, though these were dismissed by the Federal Court of Appeal. In addition, over 200 scholars, as well as the Royal Society of Canada, expressed concerns to the federal Liberal government, citing weakness in the regulatory review process and the environmental assessment for the project. In May 2016, the federal government of Canada stated it is "not revisiting projects that have been reviewed and approved". On 11 December 2017, John Horgan, the premier of British Columbia, announced: "We've come to a conclusion that, although Site C is not the project we would have favoured or would have started, it must be completed", thus guaranteeing the completion of the project.

On 8 November 2024, BC Hydro announced that the reservoir was full and that the first generator was operational. The John Horgan Dam and Generating Station became fully operational on August 8, 2025.

== History ==
Site C is the third major dam on the Peace River. The first project was the W. A. C. Bennett Dam 19 kilometres west of Hudson's Hope. The Bennett Dam began operation in 1968 and formed Williston Reservoir, which is the third largest man-made lake in North America, with a total area of 1,761 km^{2} (680 sq mi). The second dam, Peace Canyon Dam, was completed in 1980 23 km downstream of the Bennett dam. The Site C dam was originally proposed for 83 km downriver of the Peace Canyon dam, or approximately 7 km southwest of Fort St. John. As proposed, Site C would flood an 83 km length of the Peace River valley, widening the river by up to three times, as well as a 10 km length of the Moberly River valley and 14 km of the Halfway River valley. A fourth proposed dam on the British Columbia segment of the Peace River, Site E, near the BC–Alberta border, was removed from the planning process during hearings in 1982 but consideration began again in 2026.

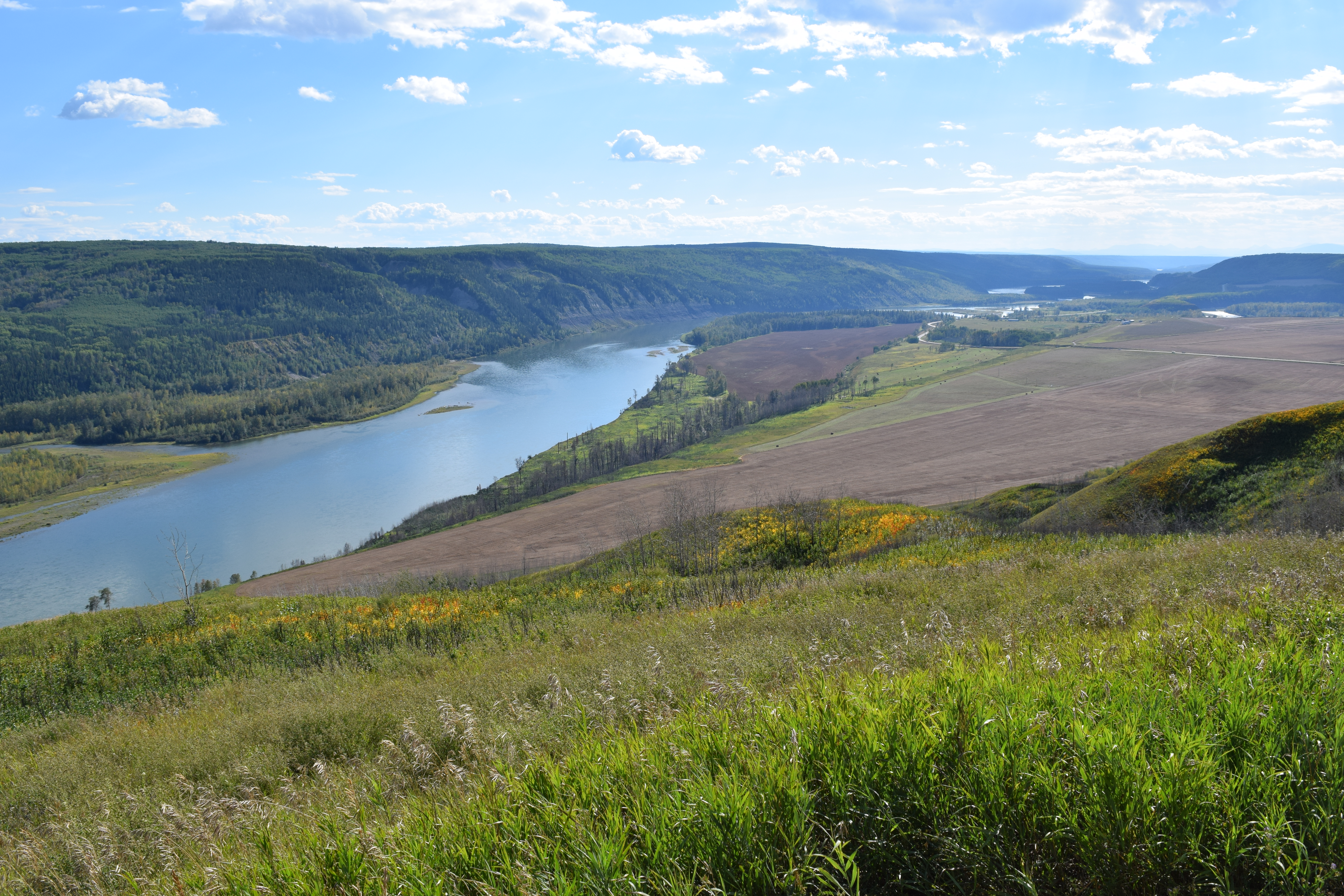
Portion of the 80-kilometre stretch of valley planned for flooding

After hearings between 1981 and 1983, the British Columbia Utilities Commission turned down the Site C project. The commission was critical of BC Hydro's forecasting methods, declaring that it neither explicitly took energy prices into account nor relied on statistically significant past patterns of behaviour. BC Hydro then chose to purchase electricity under long-term contracts from independent power producers, and it continues to do so today. As of 2017 these annual purchases are about four times the capacity of Site C. Once the initial contracts with BC Hydro expire, these independent producers may be free to export their electricity.

In April 2010, passage of the Clean Energy Act exempted the project from further BC Utilities Commission review. Site C was being reconsidered by BC Hydro for two years prior as the utility reconsidered expansion of its dam capacity on the Peace. Also in April 2010, the provincial government announced it would move forward on planning for the project, moving it to the regulatory review phase. The review was mandated under the Canadian Environmental Assessment Act, 2012 (CEAA 2012) and the British Columbia Environmental Assessment Act (BCEAA). To avoid duplication, the governments of Canada and British Columbia set up a cooperative federal-provincial environmental assessment, including a joint review panel (JRP) process.

In October 2014, Site C received environmental assessment approvals from the federal and provincial governments after a three-year environmental review, including a federal/provincial Joint Review Panel process. In December 2014, the provincial government announced a final investment decision, approving the construction of the hydroelectric project at $8.335 billion, as well as a project reserve of $440 million. A notice of Site C construction commencing in 2015 was issued in July 2015. By March 2016, site clearing, attempts at bank stabilization and the search for bedrock took the majority of BC Hydro's focus - there were no "works" in the ground; the diversion tunnels had not yet been started. BC Premier Christy Clark's stated intention was to get dam construction "to the point of no return" by the time of a scheduled general election in May 2017. The provincial election resulted in the previous Liberal government being defeated and a New Democratic government taking office. The newly elected government requested the BC Utilities Commission 2017 review.

=== Utilities Commission 2017 review ===
BC's opposition New Democratic Party promised a review of the project by the BC Utilities Commission (BCUC) should they win the 2017 general election. Hydro critic Adrian Dix called the B.C. Liberal government "reckless" for not having already done the review, as was recommended by the federal-provincial Joint Review Panel led by Harry Swain. On 2 August 2017, following a provincial election, the NDP government requested that the BCUC evaluate the cost to BC Hydro ratepayers of continuing, suspending or terminating construction of the Site C dam. In its Final Report published on 1 November 2019, the BCUC reached two overarching conclusions:

- The cost to ratepayers of suspending construction would be significantly higher than either continuing or terminating the project, to the tune of $3.6 billion. In addition, there are significant risks that it would not be possible to restart the project due to permitting and other issues.
- The cost to ratepayers of continuing or terminating construction is similar, given the assumptions that the BCUC finds to be most reasonable. Both alternatives also had risks which may cause one or the other to be more costly to ratepayers either in the short-term or over a longer period.

To assist the government in its decision-making, the BCUC included in the Final Report some sensitivity analyses to show how the cost estimates would change if different assumptions were applied.

Following the release of the Final Report the BCUC responded to additional questions from the BC government which clarified that:

- Site C sunk and termination costs were correctly treated in the rate impact analysis (sunk costs were excluded; Site C termination costs were added to the cost of the alternative portfolio);
- The same financing cost assumption was used for Site C and wind/geothermal investments in order to ensure the review was agnostic regarding ownership structure;
- Demand-side management costs were included in the alternative portfolio at their cost to the utility, as these would be the costs incurred by BC Hydro;
- The period used to recover Site C sunk costs from customers if the project was terminated would be subject to BCUC approval. While no determination as to the appropriate period was made, a 30-year period was assumed for the rate impact analysis with sensitivity analysis on 10- and 70-year amortization periods; and
- The BCUC considered electrification in arriving at its assessment that it would be more appropriate to use BC Hydro’s low load forecast in its economic analysis. The BCUC also considered recent developments in the industrial sectors, accuracy of historical load forecasts, GDP and other forecast drivers, price elasticity assumptions, future rate increases, potential disrupting trends and historical flattening electricity demand.

On 11 December 2017, John Horgan, the premier of British Columbia, announced: "We've come to a conclusion that, although Site C is not the project we would have favoured or would have started, it must be completed", thus guaranteeing the completion of the project.

=== Construction ===
In the years prior to filling the Site C reservoir, BC Hydro removed trees and vegetation from the dam site and reservoir area in order to facilitate construction and boater safety on the finished reservoir.

In August 2024, BC Hydro began filling the reservoir, and stated it would take between 2 and 4 months to complete. BC Hydro issued a warning to stay away from the reservoir for at least a year, citing concerns of possible unstable terrain and floating debris.

In November 2024, the reservoir was announced to be full with the first generating unit being operational. As completed, the Site C reservoir is 83 kilometers long, with a total surface area of approximately 9,330 hectares and a depth of up to 52 metres. The John Horgan Dam and Generating Station became fully operational in August 2025.

The Site C dam was named the John Horgan Dam after the former premier in May 2026.

== Cost ==
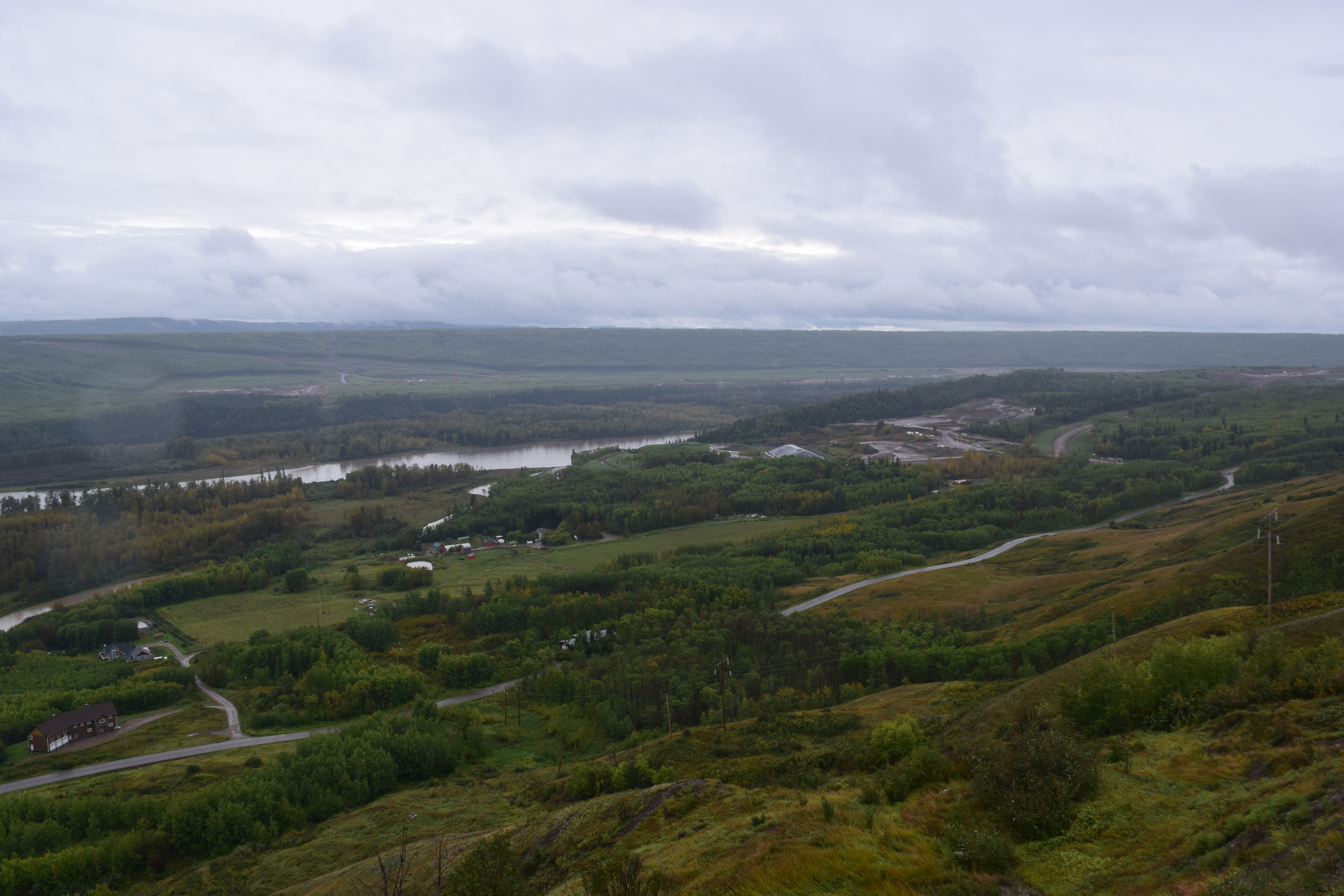
Site C Dam construction site near Fort St. John. Clearing on the far side of the river is part of the construction zone.

A cost estimate produced during the 2007 feasibility study placed the financial cost at a maximum of C$6.6 billion based on the 1981 design, safety, and engineering standards. An updated cost projection was released in May 2011 placing the estimated cost at $7.9 billion, which was revised to $8.3 billion in 2014. This does not include the cost of a transmission line to major population centres, estimated in the $743 million additional range, bringing the total estimated cost to approximately $9 billion. At the invitation of the British Columbia Utilities Commission, Deloitte published a report on the project, and noted that it's likely to miss a crucial river diversion deadline; this will bring the cost to just under $10 billion. In 2015, some experts stated that the costs could reach as high as $11 to 12 billion. In February 2021, the estimated price tag rose once again, reaching $16 billion.

Economic estimates in 2016 by Harry Swain, former chair of the Joint Review Panel and former BC deputy minister of Industry, projected that if all the power were sold to the US spot market, as little as $1.8 billion would be returned, and the rest ($7 billion) of the cost would be covered by taxpayers. Power consumption has not been increasing despite increasing population. Swain also stated that power roughly equivalent to that produced by Site C could be reclaimed from American producers under the Columbia River Treaty at no capital cost to the province; the power is currently sold to American utilities at about half the projected cost of Site C power. British Columbia Utilities Commission stated that the Canadian entitlement under the treaty, however, is not a suitable source of dependable capacity.

BC Hydro failed to disclose $128 million worth of no bid contracts it awarded, largely to SNC Lavalin until this information was revealed by The Narwhal following a Freedom of Information request. An independent review found that the same amount of energy could be produced for around half the cost using a combination of other, largely renewable energy sources.

== Legality ==
Members of the Treaty 8 First Nations boycotted the official Site C announcement ceremony at the Bennett Dam in April 2010, and the West Moberly First Nation publicly stated that it was considering legal action to oppose the dam. In April 2016, a group of landowners and farmers from BC's Peace River Valley launched a legal challenge to the project. The landowners' case states that the Provincial government ignored concerns about the project raised by the Joint Review Panel, including its cost, failure to demonstrate the need for the project, and lack of evaluation of alternatives. Also in April 2016, BC Treaty 8 First Nations filed a legal challenge in the Supreme Court of BC. The Peace Valley Landowners’ Association, BC Treaty 8 First Nations, Alberta Treaty 8 First Nations, and Blueberry River First Nation were pursuing actions in federal court.

As of December 2016, five judicial reviews of Site C's environmental approvals had been dismissed. These include two challenges from the Peace Valley Landowner Association in the B.C. Supreme Court and the Federal Court of Appeal, as well as a pair of challenges against the project's federal and provincial environmental approvals from the West Moberly and Prophet River First Nations. On 23 January 2017, the sixth legal challenge was dismissed, involving Treaty 8 First Nations, which was in the federal court.

== Scholars' concerns ==
In May 2016 a group of over 200 Canadian scholars signed a letter raising serious concerns about the process used to approve the Site C dam. The Royal Society of Canada took the "unusual step" of writing a separate supporting letter to Prime Minister Justin Trudeau. The letter from those "concerned scholars" summarized their concerns: "Our assessment is that this process did not accord with the commitments of both the provincial and federal governments to reconciliation with and legal obligations to First Nations, protection of the environment, and evidence-based decision-making with scientific integrity." Scientists argued that the environmental impacts of the dam and the lack of First Nations consent made the dam a "'bellwether' of the Trudeau government's commitment to develop resources in a more science-based, sustainable and socially responsible way." The federal government rejected the scholars' call to halt construction. Environment and Climate Change Minister Catherine McKenna's office indicated that the government had no intention to revisit the Site C environmental assessment.

== Agricultural land impacts ==
The making of Williston Reservoir affected many parts of the neighbouring environment. In “This Was Our Valley,” authors Shirlee Smith Matheson and pioneer poet Earl Pollon describe BC Hydro’s hopes for the reservoir, thinking it would bring new chances for forests, minerals, and easier fishing and hunting access. Just a few miles away from the reservoir the town Hudson’s Hope was thought to become a Canyon City, a centre for business and industry. But the water rose faster than expected, causing trouble for wildlife like moose. Around 12,500 moose died because of the flooding. The reservoir covered over 1,770 square kilometres of land, lake, and river, held back by tall dam walls. Despite what was hoped, building the Williston Lake reservoir made big changes to the environment, affecting the natural homes and systems in the area.

The Site C project will result in the largest exclusion of land in the 40-year history of BC's Agricultural Land Reserve (ALR). Of the land to be flooded, there are 2,601 hectares (6,430 acres) of Class 2 ALR land within the project activity zone. Permanent losses are estimated at 541 ha (1,340 acres) of currently cultivated land and 1,183 ha (2,920 acres) of land under grazing licence or lease areas. In all, 2,775 ha (6,860 acres) of land will be removed from the ALR for the project. The Joint Review Panel accepted BC Hydro's assessment that "production from the Peace River bottom lands is small and is certainly not important in the context of B.C." The Panel's assessment of earning potential in the next several decades led them to conclude: "The highest and best use of the Peace River valley would appear to be as a reservoir."

Professional agrologist Wendy Holm, past president of the B.C. Institute of Agrologists, argues against flooding agricultural land in the Peace River valley because it is "the only large tract of land for future horticultural expansion in the province." She notes that much of B.C.'s produce is imported from California, and growing food locally would increase food security for the province.

According to David Suzuki, flooding valuable farmland to build the dam will undermine Canada's international commitments under the Paris Agreement. Suzuki considers the farmland essential to reduce B.C.'s dependence on imported foods and minimize the carbon fuels needed to transport those foods: "It seems to me crazy to put farmland in the north underwater," Suzuki said. "We live in a food chain now in which food grows on average 3,000 kilometres from where it's consumed. The transport of all that food is dependent on fossil fuels. Food has got to be grown much closer to where it's going to be consumed."

== Proposed benefits ==
In April 2015, the federal and provincial governments named a Joint Review Panel to hold a public hearing on Site C.

In addition to a long list of recommended changes, their assessment stated: "Despite high initial costs, and some uncertainty about when the power would be needed, the Project would provide a large and long-term increment of firm energy and capacity at a price that would benefit future generations. It would do this in a way that would produce a vastly smaller burden of greenhouse gases than any alternative save nuclear power, which B.C. has prohibited." At the time the report was released, the panel added, "Site C would be the least expensive of the alternatives, and its cost advantages would increase with the passing decades as inflation makes alternatives more costly."

In reference to the Paris climate accord, Site C was predicted to prevent approximately 30 to 70 million tonnes of carbon dioxide from being generated in the atmosphere.

Ottawa discussed a new electricity inter-tie to move Site C power between BC and Alberta. Justin Trudeau commented "I think anything we can work together inter-provincially or nationally [to get] emissions down, emphasizing hydroelectricity, creating opportunities to get off coal, to get off natural gas, where possible, is good for the country. It’s good for our emissions profile; it’s good for the economy we need to build,"

== Impacts to surrounding Indigenous nations ==
For countless generations, First Nations peoples of the Peace River region have inhabited the lands that surround the Site C Dam. They explain, “In the Northeast region of British Columbia descendants of the Dane-zaa peoples, the Doig River First Nation (DRFN), known as Tsááʔ ché ne dane, have resided in the Peace River region spanning from British Columbia to Alberta for thousands of years. The community was initially recognized as the Fort St. John Beaver Band following the arrival of colonizers in 1794, who came with the fur trade. In 1900, the headman of the community signed Treaty 8, securing their rights to hunt, trap, and coexist peacefully with newcomers. However, it wasn’t until after the decline of the fur trade, as late as 1952, that they were forced to settle on reserves. Then in 1977, the Department of Indian Affairs divided their ancestors, the Fort St. John Beaver Band, into two distinct Nations: the Doig River First Nation and the Blueberry River First Nation”. The land the John Horgan Dam is located on is Doig River First Nation land, which impacts the tribes way of life and their ancestry. They have been impacted by infrastructure projects before, such as the W.A.C. Bennett Dam, up the Peace River. Members of the community believe that one key element shared between both dams is the potential combining effect, which will leave an impact on the DRFN’s Treaty rights throughout the territory. Additionally, they argue that the effects of industrial development may cause long-lasting problems with the surrounding ecosystem.

=== Kinship relations ===
It is feared that the construction of the John Horgan Dam has altered the Indigenous ways of life, primarily, the Kinship relations between the DRFN community and the Peace River beavers: “(originally named the Beaver River in the Early 1950s)”. Beavers hold significant cultural importance for the Doig River Nation (DRFN), underscoring the essential relationship between the two entities. The DRFN states that “beavers are very important to our culture and, we must ensure that sufficient beaver populations and beaver habitat are maintained in our territory, in order to sustain our way of life.” “Within the DRFN culture, beavers are regarded as kin, symbolizing a shared existence with nonhuman beings”. The construction and management of hydroelectric dams, such as the WAC Bennett Dam, John Horgan Dam, and the Peace River Canyon Dam, significantly impacted beaver populations. For instance, the release of water from those dams disrupts the beaver’s habitats by washing away their food sources and dams downstream.

In October 2014, the DRFN put forward an application to the Peace Region Fish and Wildlife Program to conduct a study on the local beavers, including the effects of existing and proposed hydroelectric facilities on beaver habitat and populations.

In November 2023, Doig River First Nation elders led a burial ceremony for ancestral remains exhumed from the Site C reservoir flooding zone. Despite DRFN Elders expressing concerns over the environmental impacts of the Site C project, BC Hydro proceeded with its construction. The reburial was first of its kind in DRFN history, and goes against the traditional beliefs and practices of the community, as Attachie states “We respect the grave. We don’t believe in cremation, we’ve never done it before. And so, it’s totally different for us to move a grave, but we don’t want it [drowning] underwater.” Attachie's sentiments show how the ceremony's implications as a departure from cultural norms.

== Treaty 8 First Nations ==
The Peace River Valley falls within the bounds of Treaty 8, which recognizes First Nations’ right to hunt, trap, and fish throughout the region. According to Indigenous activist Helen Knott, “If the valley is flooded, then the promise of that treaty will be violated." "The Treaty 8 First Nations are opposed to the proposed Site C Project for several reasons, including the estimated $8-billion cost to ratepayers, the environmental impacts, and the loss of sacred archeological, burial and sites, as well as the impacts on Treaty rights. We have already felt the adverse impacts of two major dams on the Peace River. The WAC Bennett and Peace Canyon Dams and their reservoirs have altered the landscape in the region, imposing significant environmental impacts that have not been addressed to this day. The Peace River Valley is a special and unique place and cannot be replaced. The impacts of the project are significant, and far-reaching, and cannot be mitigated. Therefore, Treaty 8’s position is that this project is unacceptable and that alternative solutions to meeting the province’s energy needs must be assessed in a meaningful way”.

== Impacts to wildlife ==
=== Bear relocation ===
The proposed flood zone will flood the Peace River Valley, a biodiverse area where four ecosystem zones meet that is home to a significant number of bears. In order to mitigate impacts on wildlife, BC Hydro proposed trapping, tranquilizing, and relocating the bears prior to the dam being filled. A permit to relocate the bears was filed on October 16, 2023, requesting permission to move the bears starting November 1, 2023. The permit application seeks to relocate the bears to artificially constructed bear dens made of straw bales while the bears are hibernating. The proposed relocation strategy was criticized as being dangerous for the bears and people moving them and for being untested.

=== Endangered and threatened species ===
B.C Hydro’s proposal to leave 45 structures of construction debris on the bottom of the Peace River upon flooding raised serious questions about the well-being of fish and their ecosystem within the community. The company argues that removing these structures could potentially harm fish and their habitat. However, residents, such as Wayne Sawchuk and Caitlin Vince, emphasize the importance of maintaining the reservoir’s cleanliness before inundation. Additionally, Vince, a long-term resident of Hudson’s Hope, says that the lack of awareness among residents about the proposal and the opportunity to provide input indicates a gap in community engagement and transparency.

== Alternatives ==
BC Hydro achieved savings at $20/MWh, while the estimated savings were at $30/MWh. Columbia Treaty and non-treaty power now sold to the US, is available at approximately $30/MWh, equivalent to Site C quantities. BC Hydro determined in the 2013 Integrated Resource Plan, DSM 5, that more than double the amount of power from Site C could be obtained from conservation at up to $45/MWh.

In 2017, Alberta received quotations for 600 MW of wind power at $37/MWh.

When BC Hydro buys power from independent power producers they set a price as low as $76.20 per megawatt hour for intermittent power from wind farms, and as high as $133.80 for firm hydro power. The average price paid, as of 2010, was $100 per megawatt hour. Site C is expected to cost $83 per megawatt hour for firm hydro power.

As of 2015, British Columbia had committed to reducing greenhouse gases to 33 per cent below 2007 levels by 2020; however, the province was far short of that goal, only achieving a 6.5% reduction as of 2015. Although the Site C dam is expected to have a large initial electricity surplus, the province proposed to sell this power rather than choosing to reduce fossil fuel consumption in the province.

In 1983, the B.C. Utilities Commission recommended the province to explore geothermal as a potential alternative to Site C. As the Site C Joint Review Panel noted in its final report on the project, the province put virtually no effort into exploring alternatives.

== See also ==
- New hydro projects in Canada
- List of generating stations in British Columbia
- Site E dam
