= Helen Knott =

Canadian writer and poet

Helen Knott is an Indigenous spoken word poet, grassroots activist, leader and social worker from the Prophet River First Nation. She is of Dane-Zaa, Nehiyaw, Métis, and European descent. Residing in Fort St. John, British Columbia, Canada, Knott has published a number of poems and short pieces of creative non-fiction in Red Rising Magazine, the Malahat Review, through CBC Arts, and in a compendium entitled Surviving Canada: Indigenous People Celebrate 150 Years of Betrayal. Most recently, she published her first book, In My Own Moccasins: A Memoir of Resilience, and is currently writing Taking Back the Bones, which has been described as an "Indigenous female manifesto". She is currently enrolled as a graduate student in the First Nations Studies program at the University of Northern British Columbia.

== Career ==
Knott is currently serving as the Director of Indigenous Education at Northern Lights College in northern British Columbia. She also advocates against violence in Indigenous lands and its correlation to violence against Indigenous women. Along with studying at UNBC, Knott has written many poems. A few of her most notable pieces of poetry include "Your Eyes They Curve Around Me" and "The Things We Taught Our Daughters". She has also appeared in many short videos advocating for ending gender-based violence. Her first book, In My Own Moccasins: A Memoir of Resilience, was published in hardcover in August 2019, and paperback in March 2020. Helen has also taken part in the Treaty 8 Caravan, calling herself an "accidental activist". Much of Knott's work is based on the land and water on which she grew up. Based on this personal connection to her tribal lands, she decided to advocate for those involved in the controversial construction of the Site C dam. Many of her written works and advocacy projects are about the correlation between resource extraction and violence against indigenous women.

Her book Becoming a Matriarch was the winner of the Jim Deva Prize for Writing that Provokes from the BC and Yukon Book Prizes in 2024, and was shortlisted for the Governor General's Award for English-language non-fiction at the 2024 Governor General's Awards.

== Treaty 8 Caravan ==
Much of Knott's advocacy began with her work against the Site C dam and taking part in the Treaty 8 Caravan. In 2014, the federal and provincial governments approved the construction of the B.C. Hydro Site C hydroelectric dam project, upsetting the people of the Prophet River and West Moberly First Nations, as it seems the dam will threaten three of the largest rivers in the Peace River territory: the Peace, Moberly, and Halfway Rivers.

In an attempt to halt the Site C dam project, Knott, elders, youth, and Treaty 8 members caravanned to Montreal, where the West Moberly and Prophet River First Nations appealed the government's decision to begin construction on the dam. The construction of Site C is alleged to violate the previously established Treaty 8, which states the First Nations could continue their traditional practices of hunting, trapping, fishing, and collecting medicinal plants "for as long as the sun shines, the rivers flow and the grass grows."

Against the wishes of the Treaty 8 Caravan, logging and land clearing for the dam began in 2015. The dam is proposed to be 60-meters high and 1,050-meters-long on the Peace River between the communities of Hudson's Hope and Taylor on Treaty 8 territory. The dam became fully operational in 2025.

== Works ==
- In My Own Moccasins: A Memoir Of Resilience (University of Regina Press, 2020)
- Becoming a Matriarch: A Memoir (Knopf Canada, 2023)
