= Peace River =

River in Canada

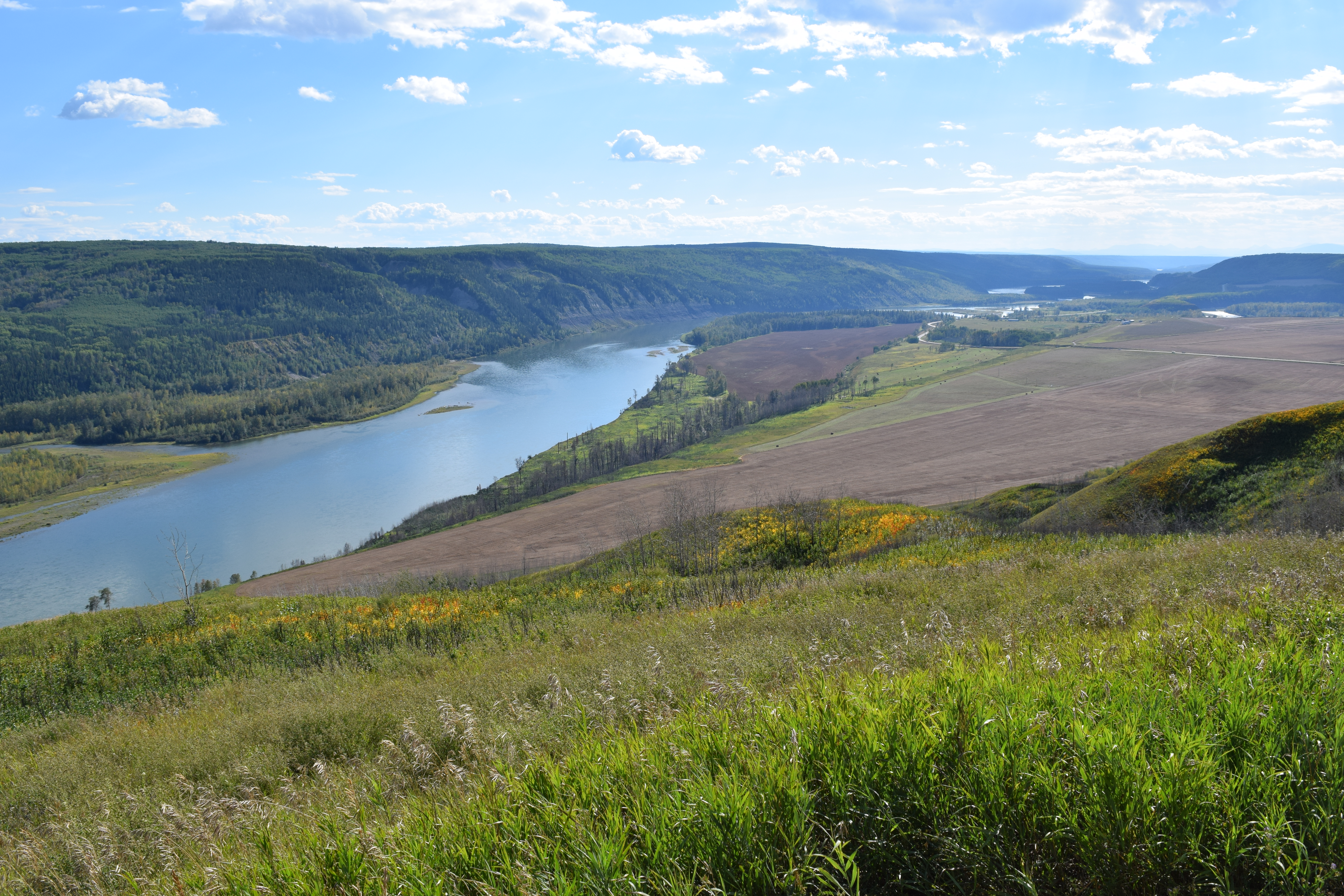
- Peace River Valley in BC

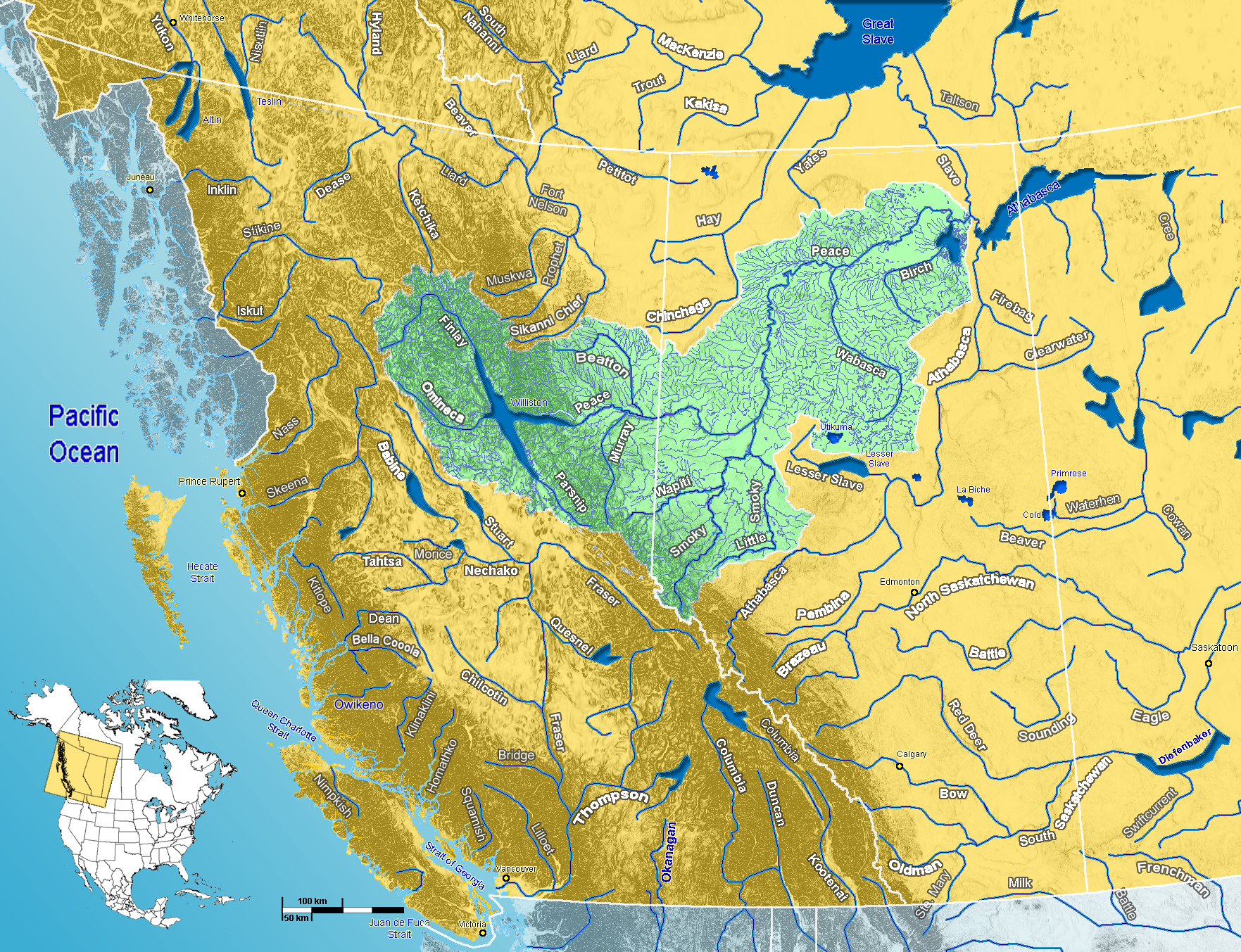
- Map of the Peace River watershed in western Canada
- Etymology: Peace Point, Alberta, where a treaty marking the river as the boundary between Beaver and Cree was signed in 1781
- Native name: Unchaga (Dane-zaa); Rivière de la Paix (French)

Location
- Country: Canada
- Province: British Columbia, Alberta
- Cities: Fort Saint John, British Columbia, Peace River, Alberta

Physical characteristics
- Source: Finlay River
  - location: Thutade Lake, British Columbia
  - coordinates: 57°04′29″N 126°53′36″W
  - elevation: 1,140 m (3,740 ft)
- 2nd source: Parsnip River
  - location: Near Mount Barton, British Columbia
  - coordinates: 54°30′02″N 121°26′26″W
  - elevation: 1,716 m (5,630 ft)
- Source confluence: Williston Lake
  - coordinates: 55°59′21″N 123°50′08″W
  - elevation: 748 m (2,454 ft)(Elevation of Williston Lake)
- Mouth: Slave River
  - location: Confluence of Peace with Athabasca River, Alberta
  - coordinates: 59°00′01″N 111°24′38″W
- Length: 1,923 km (1,195 mi)
- Basin size: 306,000 km^{2} (118,000 sq mi)
- Discharge
  - location: Peace Point, Alberta
  - average: 2,110 m^{3}/s (75,000 cu ft/s)
  - minimum: 344 m^{3}/s (12,100 cu ft/s)
  - maximum: 9,790 m^{3}/s (346,000 cu ft/s)

Basin features
- River system: Mackenzie River watershed
- Tributaries
  - left: Finlay River, Halfway River, Beatton River, Clear River (Alberta), Ponton River
  - right: Parsnip River, Pine River, Kiskatinaw River, Pouce Coupé River, Smoky River, Wabasca River, Mikkwa River

The Peace River (French: rivière de la Paix) is a 1,923-kilometre-long (1,195 mi) river in Canada that originates in the Rocky Mountains of northern British Columbia and flows to the northeast through northern Alberta. The Peace River joins the Athabasca River in the Peace-Athabasca Delta to form the Slave River, a tributary of the Mackenzie River. The Finlay River, the main headwater of the Peace River, is regarded as the ultimate source of the Mackenzie River. The combined Finlay–Peace–Slave–Mackenzie river system is the 13th longest river system in the world.

== History ==
The regions along the river are the traditional home of the Dane-zaa people, called the Beaver by the Europeans. The fur trader Peter Pond is believed to have visited the river in 1785. In 1788 Charles Boyer of the North West Company established a fur trading post at the river's junction with the Boyer River.

In 1792 and 1793, the explorer Alexander Mackenzie travelled up the river to the Continental Divide. Mackenzie referred to the river as Unjegah, from the Dane-zaa meaning "large river."

The decades of hostilities between the Dane-zaa and the Cree, (in which the Cree dominated the Dane-zaa), ended in 1781 when a smallpox epidemic decimated the Cree. The Treaty of the Peace was celebrated by the smoking of a ceremonial pipe. The treaty made the Peace River a border, with the Dane-zaa to the North and the Cree to the South.

In 1794, a fur trading post was built on the Peace River at Fort St. John; it was the first European settlement established on the British Columbia mainland.

=== Post-settlement ===
The rich soils of the Peace River valley in Alberta have been producing wheat crops since the late 19th century. In the early 21st century, the BC Grain Producers Association was researching the productivity of wheat and other grain crops near Dawson Creek. The Peace River region is also an important centre of oil and natural gas production. There are also pulp and paper plants along the river in Alberta and British Columbia.

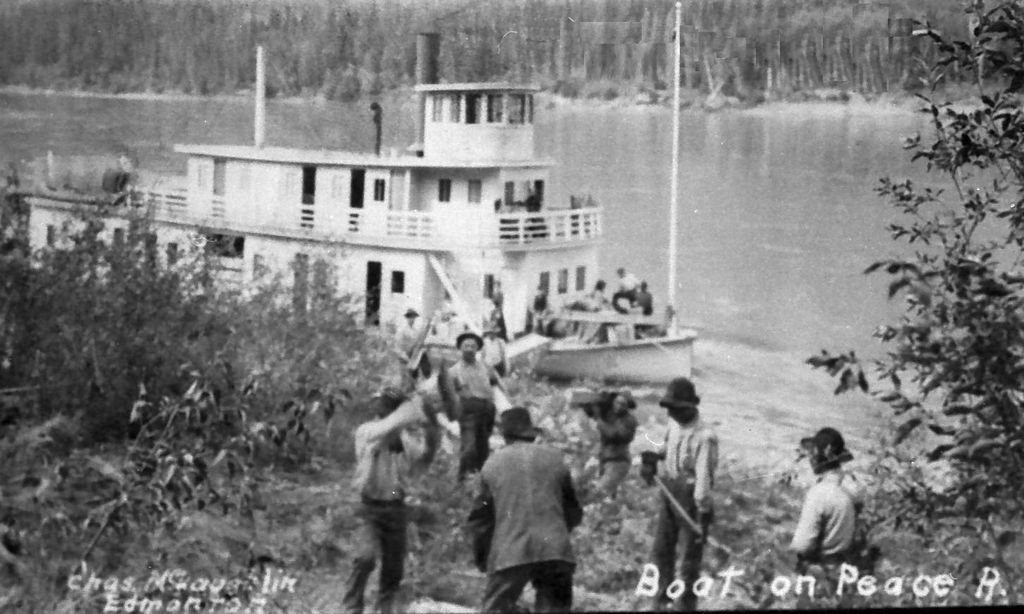
The Grenfell was one of the vessels that shipped cargo on the Peace River.

The Peace River has two navigable sections, separated by the Vermilion Chutes, near Fort Vermilion. The first steam-powered vessel to navigate the Peace River was the Grahame, a Hudson's Bay Company vessel built at Fort Chipewyan, on Lake Athabasca. Brothers of the Oblate Order of Mary Immaculate built the St. Charles to navigate the upper reaches of the river, from Fort Vermilion to Hudson's Hope. Approximately a dozen vessels were to navigate the river. Most of the early vessels were wood-burning steamships, fuelled by wood cut from the river's shore. The last cargo vessel was the Watson's Lake, retired in 1952.

=== Hydroelectric development ===
Hydroelectric development began on the Peace River in 1968 and continues to be an important source of renewable energy for British Columbia's main electricity provider, BC Hydro. The river's first dam, the W. A. C. Bennett Dam, was completed in 1968 and is British Columbia's largest dam and the third-largest hydroelectric facility in Canada. It supplies over 30% of British Columbia's total power demand. Engineers took advantage of the W. A. C. Bennet Dam's large reservoir storage to further develop the river with the Peace Canyon Dam opened in 1980. The Site C dam was finished in 2025; it will further benefit from the upstream dams and generate additional electrical capacity to meet British Columbia's growing demand for green energy and reduce the carbon footprint of residents. As of 2020 both the Alberta government and private producers were studying the possibility of hydroelectric development on the Alberta stretch of the river with one run-of-the-river project currently being proposed. In 2026, British Columbia considered proposals for the Site E dam project at the confluence of the Peace and Alces Rivers.

Existing and proposed dams on Peace River listed in downstream order
Name	Height	Capacity (MW)	Province	Year completed	Owner	Reservoir name
W. A. C. Bennett Dam	186 m	2730	B.C.	1968	BC Hydro	Williston Lake
Peace Canyon Dam	50 m	694	B.C.	1980	BC Hydro	Dinosaur Lake
Site C Dam	60 m	1100	B.C.	2025 planned	BC Hydro	TBD
Amisk Dam	24 m	370	Alberta	late 2020s	Concord Green Energy	TBD

== Geography ==
=== Course ===
This river is 1,923 kilometres (1,195 mi) long (from the head of Finlay River to Lake Athabasca). It drains an area of approximately 302,500 square kilometres (116,800 mi^{2}). At Peace Point, where it drains in the Slave River, it has an annual discharge of 68.2 billion cubic metres (55.3 million acre-feet).

A large man-made lake, Williston Lake, has been formed on the upper reaches by the construction of the W. A. C. Bennett Dam for hydroelectric power generation. Prior to its flooding, the confluence of the Finlay and Parsnip Rivers at Finlay Forks was distinct. A half mile east of that location were the half-mile long Finlay Rapids and a further seven miles east is the Peace Pass, which separates the Muskwa Ranges and the Hart Ranges of the Canadian Rockies.

The only river cutting completely through the Rockies, it nowadays flows into Dinosaur Lake, a reservoir for the Peace Canyon Dam. After the dams, the river flows east into Alberta and then continues north and east into the Peace-Athabasca Delta in Wood Buffalo National Park, at the western end of Lake Athabasca. Water from the delta flows into the Slave River east of Peace Point and reaches the Arctic Ocean via the Great Slave Lake and Mackenzie River.

=== Communities ===
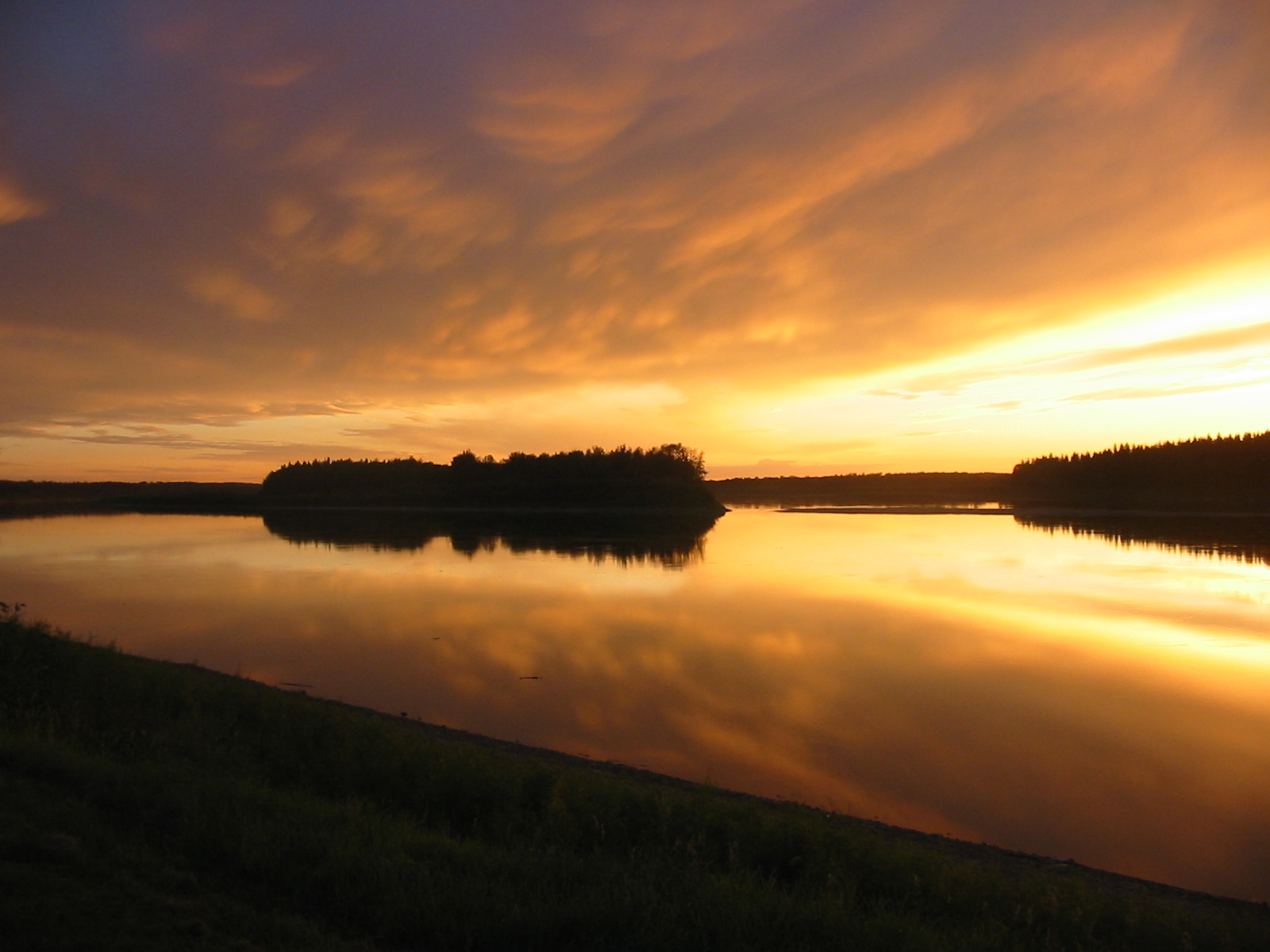
Peace River in Fort Vermilion, Alberta.

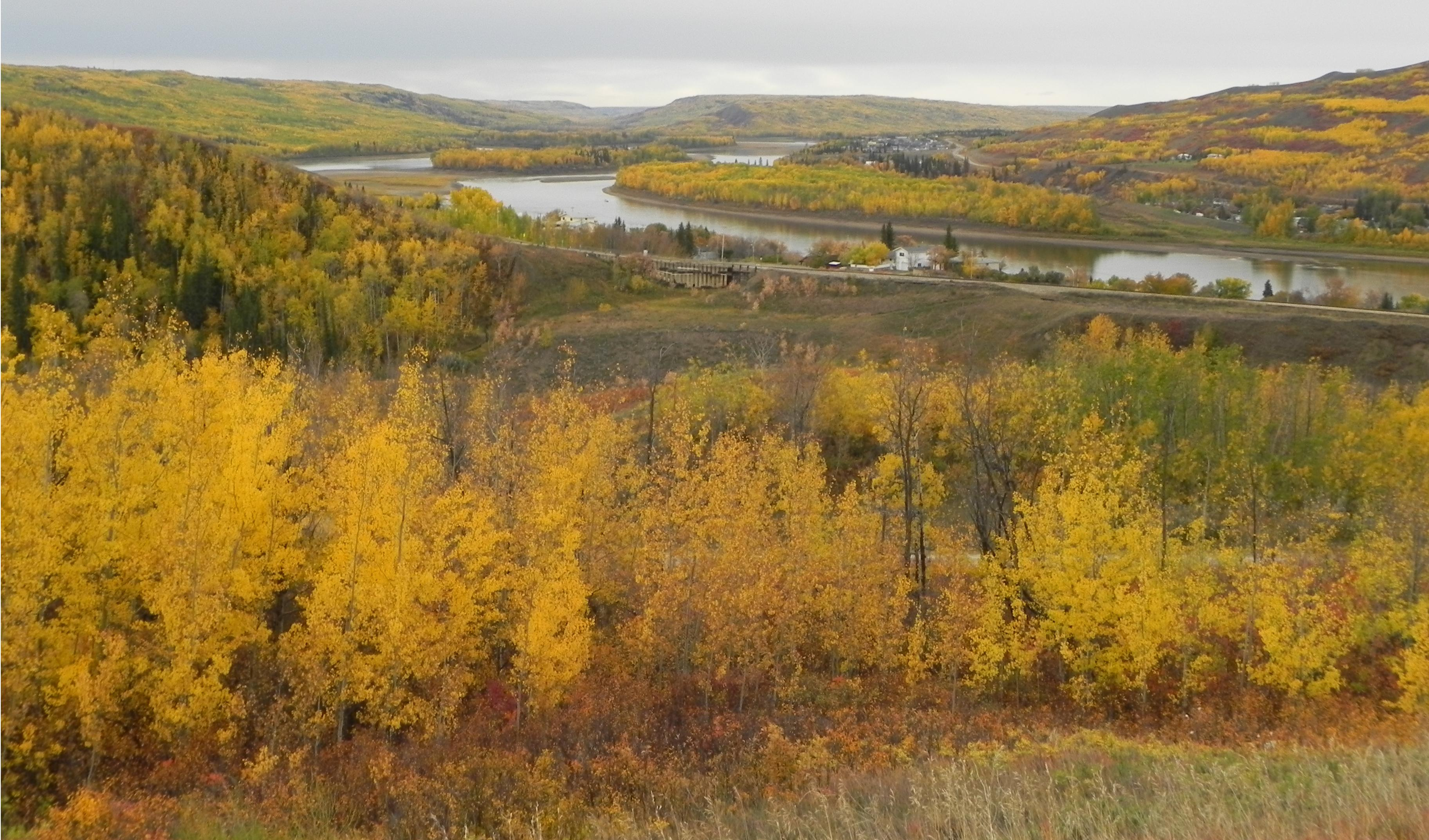
The Peace River as it winds past the town of Peace River during the autumntime.

Communities located directly on the river include:

- Hudson's Hope, British Columbia
- Taylor, British Columbia
- Peace River, Alberta
- Fort Vermilion, Alberta

Many provincial parks and wildland reserves are established on the river, such as Butler Ridge Provincial Park, Taylor Landing Provincial Park, Beatton River Provincial Park, Peace River Corridor Provincial Park in British Columbia and Dunvegan Provincial Park, Dunvegan West Wildland Provincial Park, Peace River Wildland Provincial Park, Greene Valley Provincial Park, Notikewin Provincial Park, Wood Buffalo National Park in Alberta.

A few Indian reserves are also on the river banks, among them Beaver Ranch 163, John D'Or Prairie 215, Fox Lake 162, Peace Point 222 and Devil's Gate 220.

=== Tributaries ===
Tributaries of the Peace River include:

Williston Lake

- Finlay River
- Omineca River
- Ingenika River
- Ospika River
- Parsnip River
- Manson River
- Nation River
- Clearwater Creek
- Nabesche River
- Carbon Creek

Northeastern British Columbia

- Gething Creek, Moosbar Creek, Johnson Creek, Starfish Creek, Bullrun Creek, Portage Creek, Maurice Creek, Lynx Creek, Farrell Creek
- Halfway River
- Cache Creek, Wilder Creek, Tea Creek
- Moberly River
- Pine River
- Eight Mile Creek
- Beatton River
  - Doig River
  - Blueberry River
- Golata Creek, Mica Creek
- Kiskatinaw River
- Alces River

Alberta

- Moonlight Creek
- Pouce Coupe River
- Clear River
- Sneddon Creek
- Montagneuse River
- Fourth Creek, Hamelin Creek
- Ksituan River
- Hines Creek, Dunvegan Creek, Boucher Creek
- Leith River (Little Burnt River)
- Saddle River (Burnt River)
- Griffin Creek, Mcallister Creek, Strong Creek
- Smoky River
- Heart River
- Pat's Creek, Three Creeks, Carmon Creek
- Whitemud River
- Cadotte River
- Buchanan Creek, Keppler Creek
- Notikewin River
- Scully Creek
- Wolverine River
- Buffalo River
- Keg River
- Steephill Creek
- Boyer River
- Caribou River
- Beaver Ranch Creek
- Wabasca River
- Lawrence River
- Mikkwa River (Little Red River)
- Dummy Creek, Waldo Creek
- Pakwanutik River
- Garden Creek, Drolet Creek, Swan River, Vermilion River, Trident Creek, Portage River
- Jackfish River
- Jodoin Creek
- Claire River

Lake Claire

- Lake Claire
  - Birch River
  - McIvor River
  - Mamawi Lake
- Baril River
- Chenal Des Quatre Fourches
- Revolution Coupe
- Scow Channel

== See also ==
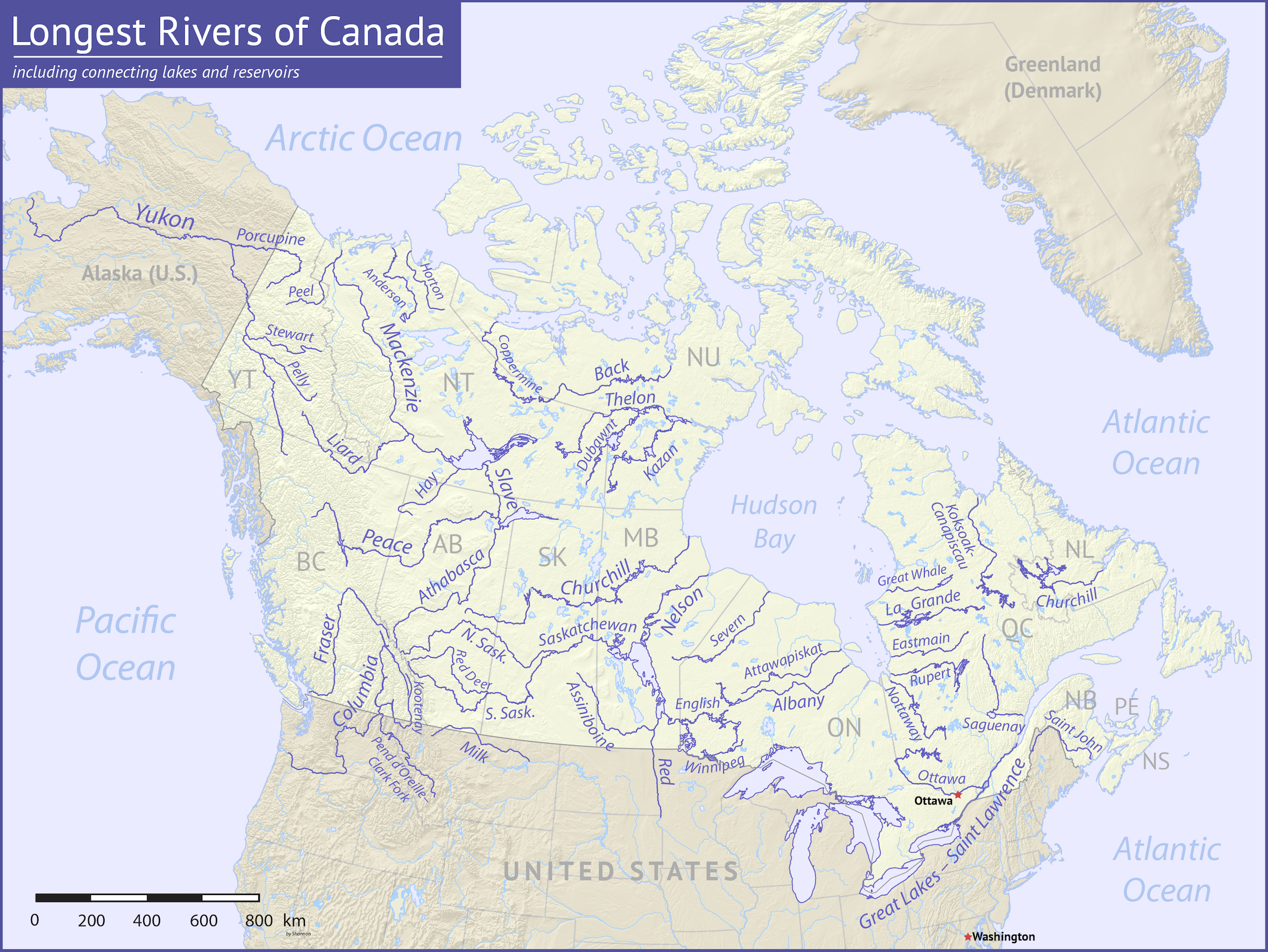
Longest Rivers of Canada

- List of rivers of Alberta
- List of rivers of British Columbia
- List of longest rivers of Canada
