= Alces River =

River in British Columbia, Canada

Coordinates: 56°07′38″N 120°03′20″W

Alces River is a river in the north-eastern part of the Canadian province of British Columbia. It is a tributary of the Peace River. Alces River flows south and enters the Peace River at 56 01' 38" N 120 03' 20"W. It is about 70 kilometres (43 mi) long.

== See also ==
- List of rivers of British Columbia
- Site E dam
