= W. A. C. Bennett Dam =

Dam in Hudson's Hope, British Columbia, Canada

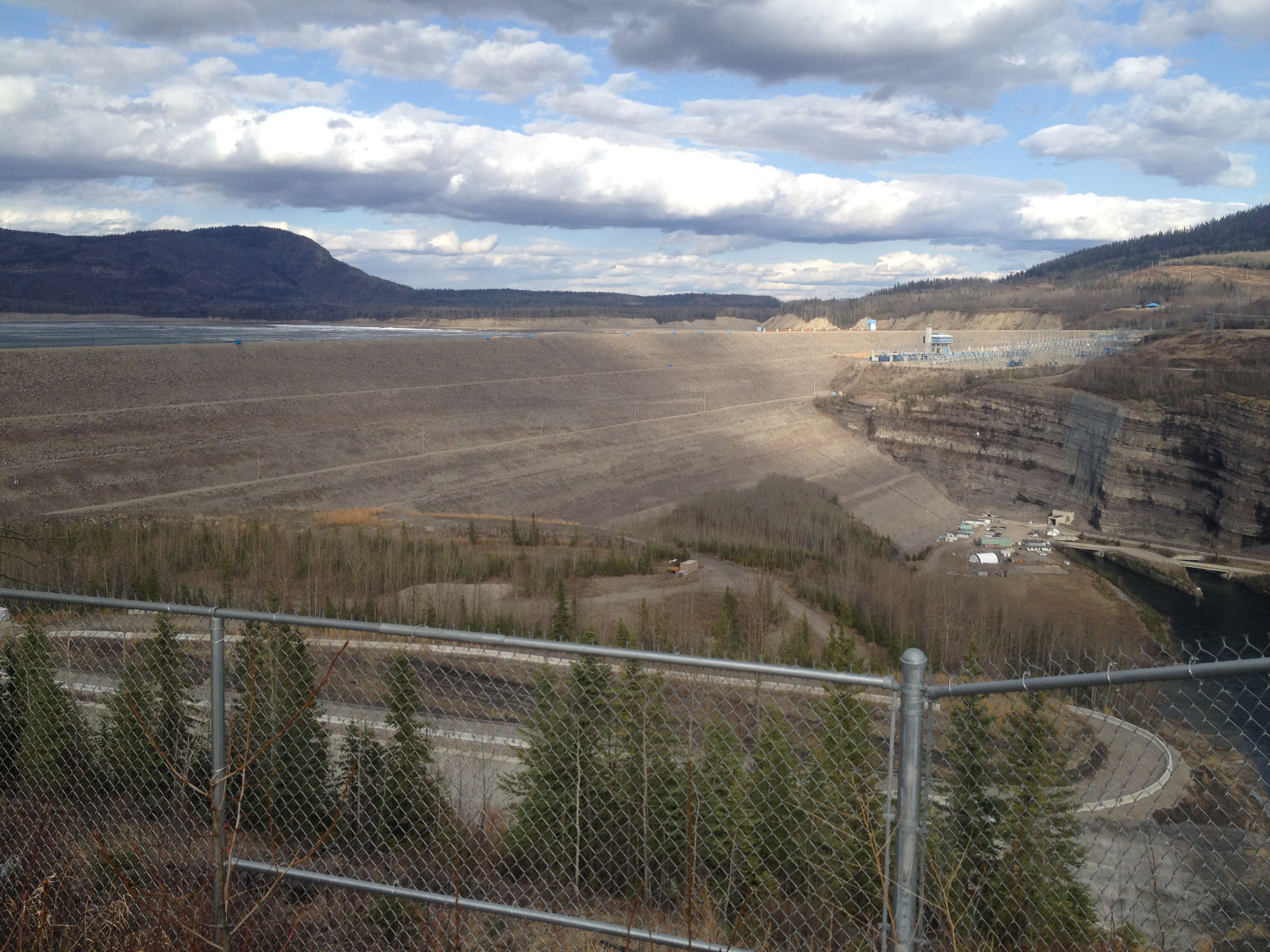
- The W. A. C. Bennett Dam, taken from the viewpoint

- Location within British Columbia
- Interactive map of W. A. C. Bennett Dam
- Location: Hudson's Hope, British Columbia, Canada
- Construction began: 1963
- Opening date: 1968
- Owner: BC Hydro

Dam and spillways
- Type of dam: Embankment dam
- Impounds: Peace River
- Height: 186 m (610 ft)
- Length: 2,068 m (6,785 ft)
- Spillway capacity: 9,205 m^{3}/s (325,100 cu ft/s)

Reservoir
- Creates: Williston Lake
- Total capacity: 74 km^{3} (60,000,000 acre⋅ft)
- Surface area: 1,761 km^{2} (680 sq mi)

Power Station
- Turbines: 10
- Installed capacity: 2,907 MW
- Capacity factor: 58.9%
- Annual generation: 15 TWh (54 PJ)

The W. A. C. Bennett Dam is a large hydroelectric dam on the Peace River in northern British Columbia, Canada. At 186 metres (610 ft) high, it is one of the world's highest earth fill dams. Construction of the dam began in 1961 and culminated in 1968. At the dam, Williston Lake, also referred to as Williston Reservoir, drains into the Peace River. It is the third largest artificial lake in North America (after Smallwood Reservoir and Manicouagan Reservoir) as well as the largest body of fresh water in British Columbia. Williston Lake runs 250 kilometres north–south and 150 kilometres east–west.

The construction of the dam cost $750 million, making it the largest project of its kind in the province of BC. The dam was named after Premier W. A. C. Bennett because his vision played a major role in the project initiation, development, and realization; the reservoir was named after the premier's trusted cabinet colleague: Ray Williston. The Gordon M. Shrum Generating Station at the W. A. C. Bennett Dam has the capacity to generate more than 13,000 GWh annually, at times supplying over a third of B.C's power demand. At the time of its construction the powerhouse was the largest of its kind worldwide; it continues to be the largest power station in B.C and it is the third largest hydroelectric development in Canada after Robert-Bourassa and Churchill Falls.

In addition to the benefits related to the clean energy generated, the construction of the dam and the reservoir also provided economic opportunities for the province of British Columbia, for the newly founded provincially owned electric utility BC Hydro, and for the large number of workers. These workers were involved in the planning, construction, operation, and maintenance of the project. Considerable costs were involved in the government funded project, the clearing of the area for the reservoir, called the Trench, alone cost $5 million.

The building of the dam and the reservoir were not without controversy. One controversy was caused by the significant negative environmental effects the project had on the immediate environment. In the process of creating Williston Lake, 350,000 acres of former forest land was flooded. This caused the loss of plant and wildlife biodiversity as well as risking mineral and timber rights.

A second controversy related to the fact that the land had been inhabited prior to its flooding, therefore the flooding resulted in the displacement of the forty or fifty residents located in the Trench. Among them were members of the Tsay Keh Dene First Nation, then known as Ingenika. The displacement had negative social impacts on the inhabitants as the loss of the land that had previously supported them meant loss of autonomy and resulted in isolation, alienation, and "social disorganization". A BC Hydro consultant admitted in 1977 that the 'isolation imposed by the reservoir had severe impacts on Ingenika society and culture".

== History ==
=== W. A. C. Bennett and high modernism ===
W. A. C. Bennett was the Premier of British Columbia from 1952 to 1972. Bennett was committed to the large-scale, state-directed development of British Columbia and promoted the continued development of natural resources. Large hydroelectric projects, such as the W. A. C. Bennett Dam, were part of the resource development for which Bennett was advocating. In his opinion, harnessing nature would make British Columbia wealthy and support the emergence of an industrial economy as well as a society that was, "connected, institutionally anchored, urban, wealthy, and domestic.".

Bennett's convictions, and therefore the policies of his government, concerning hydroelectric development have been regarded as a manifestation of the ideology high modernity, also known as high modernism. Along with the benefits that high modernist development could bring, there were also consequences. High modernism, along with the administrative ordering of nature and society, authoritarian state, and a "prostrate civil society which would be unable to resist high modernist plans", can be a recipe for disaster. It is debatable whether or not all of these elements were present in British Columbia at the time, but regardless, the development of the Peace River led to environmental changes that caused a minority of people to live in isolation, dependence, alienation, and illness. On the other hand, the hydroelectric projects realized by Bennett's Two Rivers policy created a large supply of less expensive energy in British Columbia, which provided industrial growth and therefore employment.

=== Two Rivers policy ===
W. A. C. Bennett's Two Rivers policy aimed to develop the hydroelectric potential of both the Peace and Columbia Rivers simultaneously. The policy stemmed from Bennett's desire to wrest control of resources away from the federal government in regards to power development in the province. Bennett and the American company Kaiser Aluminum and Chemical Corporation of the United States had agreed that in return for a fifty-year water license, the Kaiser Corporation would construct a large dam on the upper Columbia River. Not only would they pay for the construction, they would also return 20% of the electricity generated to British Columbia and pay the provincial taxes as well as water license fees. Much to Bennett's dismay, the federal government of Canada dissolved the deal by asserting its right of control over international waterways and took over negotiations with the United States. It would appear that British Columbia was not to be allowed to sell electricity to America for provincial profit.

In response, Bennett turned his attention towards developing the Peace River's hydroelectric potential at the previously identified site of Portage Mountain by constructing a massive storage dam that would later be named the W. A. C. Bennett dam. Bennett hoped that the economic independence British Columbia would gain by developing the Peace River would provide the leverage necessary for the federal government of Canada to allow British Columbia to sell electricity that could be created by damming the Columbia River to the Americans. This 'Two Rivers' policy faced opposition from people who thought that if the Columbia were developed, the electricity generated should be for Canada's sole use as opposed to America's.

The Two Rivers policy led to the development of the WAC Bennett Dam on the Peace River and the Keenleyside Dam and Mica Dam on the Columbia River together with Duncan Dam at the top of Kootenay Lake. In 1964 the policy was formally realized with ratification of the Columbia River Treaty by the Government of Canada and the United States of America. Because of his Two Rivers policy, Bennett was successful in pressuring the federal government of Canada to allow British Columbia to 'sell electricity' to the Americans for a thirty-year period for the lump sum of US$275 million. The nationalization of BC Electric (1961), which was rolled over into the BC Power Commission to form BC Hydro, can also be seen as a part of this strategy.

=== Site selection ===
Ray Williston, the minister of land and forests for the provincial government at the time, proposed turning sections of the Peace and Columbia River basins known as the Rocky Mountain Trench into a source of power generation. The "Power Trench", as it was known, would provide not only electricity, but give the ability to control water flow for flood prevention and agricultural purposes in the U.S. and Canada. In 1957 twelve locations along the Peace River were identified by the Wenner-Gren British Columbia Development Company as potential sites to build a dam. One of the sites, located 22 kilometres from Hudson's Hope, was judged to be the best location due to its geography. Gordon Shrum, a physics professor at the University of British Columbia, was chosen to conduct a study on the cost effectiveness of developing dams on the Peace and Columbia rivers. The study led to the conclusion that it would be cheaper to build on the Peace River, but only if a public company was used due to lower interest rates available to crown corporations.

=== Construction ===
When plans for construction were given the green light on the W. A. C. Bennett Dam (known as the Portage Mountain Dam during construction), clearing the soon to be reservoir was the first step in the process. It was a massive undertaking which was completed on the shoestring budget of five million dollars by the Forest Service Branch. When the water rose, hundreds of thousands of acres of cut trees floated on the lake surface The initial stages of construction required building a coffer dam, preparing the foundations and injecting grout into the ground to create a watertight seal, building a drainage system, and excavating to create a solid base for building. Over the course of construction, 55 million cubic yards (42 million cubic metres) of rock and dirt were taken from the nearby glacial moraine by conveyor belt to create the dam relying primarily on gravity to hold it together. Upon completion, the W. A. C. Bennett Dam became one of the biggest earth-filled dams in the world stretching 183 metres tall, 800 metres wide, by two kilometres long (200 × 875 × 2,187 yd). When finished, the dam incorporated one of the largest hydroelectric generating stations. Components are located as far as 150 m (490 ft) below ground and includes 10 generating units located deep underground in the powerhouse. The Main powerhouse structure is named the G.M. Shrum generating station. It was designed to resemble a giant transformer to reflect its function and modern design of the 1960s.

The project was widely seen as a success, especially considering its remote location far from civilization. The construction project was managed by Gordon Shrum, the appointed head of the newly created BC Hydro crown corporation. The provincial government had specifically created BC Hydro as a way of financing the project through lower interest rates available to crown corporations and to control the development of provincial energy resources. When Shrum took over the project in 1961 it was already a year behind schedule meeting the 1968 deadline to generate power. Through a 'hands on', 'cost conscious' and a 'design as you go' strategy, the project was officially completed in the fall of 1967 with the first generators going online in 1968. The project was completed on time and on budget; however, additional construction would continue through the 1970s with final completion in 1980 when the last generator was installed.

The construction of the W. A. C. Bennett Dam involved over twenty unions that were bound by ten-year contracts guaranteeing BC Hydro no lockouts or strike action. This contract allowed the project to be built without labour delays. The men involved on the project were international, coming from around North America, Europe, and as far as Japan. The workers onsite lived in temporary camps built around the Portage Mountain site with more workers in the summer and fewer in the winter. Much of the construction occurred inside the dam which was claustrophobic, full of exhaust fumes, and occasionally subject to cave-ins. In total, 16 men have lost their lives working on the dam.

During the construction process, the Portage Mountain lookout was one of the first buildings built so that tourists could view the progress on the dam.

=== Upgrading and refurbishment ===
From 2009 to 2012, units 6 to 8 were refurbished to increase the plant capacity by 90 megawatts. The last unit of them, unit 7, was put into service on November 29, 2012.

Units 1 to 5 have undergone complete refurbishment and upgrades, increasing the reliability and capacity of the first units installed at G.M. Shrum. The upgrades increase the generating capacity of each unit by as much as 17%.

== Economic investment and opportunity ==
=== Province of British Columbia ===
In the 1950s, as well as the decades before and after, the economy of British Columbia had largely been based on the extraction of natural resources and had therefore been susceptible to fluctuations in the world's demand for the respective resources. Despite the potentially unreliable economy resulting from this susceptibility, British Columbia was considered to be one of the most sought-out Canadian provinces to live in. This was due to the fact that British Columbia had the country's highest real per capita income which resulted in high standards of living for its residents. It was not until W. A. C. Bennett's premiership and vision for his province though that British Columbia saw the realization of its hydroelectric energy potential. Bennett believed that any natural resource that was not used was wasted and pushed for the development of ways to harness the enormous unrealized hydroelectric energy power potential of the Peace River. Today, the W. A. C. Bennett and Peace Canyon facilities produce about 35% of British Columbia's total electricity.

=== BC Hydro ===
The British Columbia Hydro and Power Authority Act, introduced by Premier W. A. C. Bennett in March 1962, laid out the plan in which he would pursue his Two Rivers Policy. BC Electric had refused to commit to buying the power that would be harnessed from the Peace River development as cheaper power was available elsewhere. Hence, the BC Hydro and Power Authority Act merged BC Electric with another crown corporation, the BC Power Commission, into a newly formed BC Hydro which was co-chaired by Gordon Shrum of BC Electric and Hugh Keenleyside of BC Power Commission. BC Hydro became responsible for the building of the dam, powerhouse and associated infrastructure.

=== Local community and workers ===
The building of the dam and the powerhouse and the creation of Williston Lake provided economic opportunities to the high number of workers who found employment with BC Hydro or one of the subcontractors; these workers included members of the local First Nations, non-native residents, non-residents, and immigrants. One of the subcontractors was the Forest Service Branch of the Department of Lands and Forests to whom BC Hydro paid $5 million to clear the area that would become Williston Lake—an area that was covered in timber to 80%. At the peak of project, 3,500 workers were employed. Many of them had moved to the area for the job and settled down, at least temporarily, in close proximity to the dam project. Hudson's Hope, a frontier town, was one of the communities in which many of the non-resident workers found a home; during the project, the population of Hudson's Hope rose from 800 to over 5,000 in 1968 and dropped to less than 1,500 by the early 1980s. In addition, about 2,000 workers lived at a camp in close proximity to the dam.

== Social impacts ==
=== First Nations communities ===
When it became clear that the environmental impacts of the dam would render land unlivable to First Nations groups who were dependent on the hereditary sites, the British Columbia government offered a settlement of $1.7 million. The settlement resulted in the government's purchase of fourteen thousand acres of land, including timber and mineral rights, buying out approximately one hundred and fifty individuals. Of those one hundred and fifty, roughly one third were members of the Tsay Keh Dene First Nation. Outside of relocation, traditional hunting and fishing grounds around the Fort Grahame and Finlay Forks areas were severely impacted by ecological change. Many species of fish as well as mountain caribou and muskrats were no longer available for consumption or traditional use. These changes to First Nations independence through fur trade and the relocation of many people to new reserves caused an influx in demand for government assistance through welfare. Between 1965 and 1970, social assistance provided by the Provincial government to Indigenous groups in the areas surrounding the Bennett Dam increased by 300 percent. The devastating impact of the dam on traditional ways of life is documented in detail in a doctoral dissertation by Daniel Sims, a Tsay Keh Dene First Nation member.

As recently as October 2008, the Kwadacha First Nation, another First Nations group residing in the Fort Ware area located at the north end of the Finlay Reach of Lake Williston, reached a settlement with the British Columbia government and BC Hydro over damages suffered during construction and operation of the dam and Williston Lake. The settlement included a $15 million lump-sum payment and annual payments of $1.6 million adjusted for inflation.

The effects of the project on the Tsay Keh Dene First Nation were profiled in The Scattering of Man (DƏNE YI’INJETL), a 2021 documentary film by Luke Gleeson.

=== Local residents ===
When the government, controlled by the Social Credit Party of British Columbia, dammed the Peace River to generate hydroelectricity it had already set into motion a series of social changes in the surrounding communities. These social changes had positive effects for workers who flocked to the area to secure jobs and economic opportunities unavailable elsewhere. It also had negative effects for residents who lived in the surrounding areas prior to the dam's construction. British Columbia Premier W. A. C. Bennett saw growing communities when he envisioned the damming of the Peace River in 1952. In 1964, his vision would be validated as a result of the "instant town" of Mackenzie, where thousands of individuals would find employment with BC Forest Products. The company spent $60 million on a "forestry complex" to process timber resulting from clearing land for the construction of the dam. For residents who had lived in the surrounding areas prior to the dam's planned construction, development caused many to be pushed off homesteads for small monetary settlements. One resident who owned a thousand acres of land, much of which was used for farming, was offered only twenty-eight thousand dollars by BC Hydro to secure the property. However, for local residents of Anglo ethnicity, full-time waged work was more easily accessible due to the employment opportunities produced directly and indirectly by the damming project.

== Environmental and ecological impacts ==
=== Downstream ===
Since the construction of the W. A. C. Bennett Dam, a number of environmental changes have taken place. The dam is responsible for less drastic fluctuations in the water levels of the downstream portions of the Peace River, creating modifications to both plant and animal life in the region. In addition, it has also been blamed for creating changes in the landscapes of the Athabasca Lake and Peace River, known as the Athabasca Delta. This part of the river faced significant water loss.

Downstream of the dam, the flood plains of Peace-Athabasca delta were drying up after typical bi-annual floods came to a halt, affecting the wetland biodiversity alongside the delta. For this reason, the delta experienced lower water levels, affecting both the landscape of the delta and its aquatic life. Following the completion of the Williston Lake reservoir in 1971, water coverage in the delta was reduced by 38 percent. Twenty years later, the amount of wetlands had declined by 47 percent. A reduction in the amount of discharge resulted in the accumulation of toxins and sediments downstream, decreasing the quality of the water. Fish also experienced changes as a result of the low water levels: fewer channels were accessible for walleye to reach spawning grounds and for juvenile fish to reach nursery areas, therefore jeopardizing their ability to reproduce. Dinosaur Lake was created directly downstream of the W. A. C. Bennett Dam when the Peace Canyon Dam was completed. The Peace Canyon Dam was built to produce hydro-electricity for a second time with the water coming from W. A. C. Bennett Dam and its huge reservoir. Today, it is a popular destination for camping in British Columbia. The Site C dam was proposed as a downstream duplicate of the Peace Canyon Dam.

=== Upstream and Williston Reservoir ===
The area upstream of the dam experienced a number of environmental changes as a result of the flooding of the land. The creation of Williston Reservoir flooded a vast area of former forest land, drowning a significant amount of wildlife and creating drastic changes to the landscape. It created a reservoir that measured 250 kilometres from north to south and another 150 kilometres from east to west. Two farmers asked for compensation from BC Hydro due to higher humidity compromising their ability to grow crops. Because of the vast amount of stagnant water that was introduced to the landscape following the creation of the dam, there were cooler temperatures and an increase in fog.

The creation of the reservoir compromised the livelihood of some existing aquatic life, which lived in the river prior to the dam's construction. Mountain whitefish, rainbow trout, and Arctic grayling were the primary species that faced declining populations. A number of species are known to have thrived, and it is estimated that there are more fish in the basin today than before the reservoir, but possessing levels of mercury indicating they are not entirely healthy. In 2000, British Columbia issued a Fish Consumption Advisory for bull trout and dolly varden due to the high content of mercury in these fish.

The creation of the reservoir resulted in the severing of a caribou migration route. This, along with other industrial development in Peace River Country, devastated the southern mountain populations of woodland caribou, drove the Burnt Pine herd to local extinction by 2013, and had put five out of six other herds at risk of local extinction by 2016. In the Klinse-Za herd, only 16 animals remained by 2014.

== Visitor centre ==
The W. A. C. Bennett Dam Visitor Centre is located near the dam, overlooking Williston Lake Reservoir. The centre features exhibits on the dam, hydroelectricity, and the area's natural and cultural history.

== See also ==
- List of largest power stations in Canada
- List of conventional hydroelectric power stations
- List of generating stations in BC

== Works cited ==
- Iredale, Kathryn (2008). Finding A Good Fit: The Life and Work of Architect Rand Iredale. Vancouver: Blueimprint. ISBN 9781894965903.
- Loo, Tina (2007). "Disturbing the Peace: Environmental Change and the Scales of Justice on a Northern River". Environmental History. 12 (4): 895–919. doi:10.1093/envhis/12.4.895.
- Loo, Tina (2004). "People in the Way: Modernity, Environment, and Society on the Arrow Lakes". BC Studies (142/143): 161–196.
- Mitchell, David Joseph (1994). W.A.C. Bennett and the rise of British Columbia. Vancouver: Douglas & McIntyre. ISBN 0888943954.
- Scott, James (1998). Seeing Like a State: How Certain Schemes to Improve the Social Condition Have Failed. New Haven: Yale University Press. ISBN 9780300128789.
- Stanley, Meg (2010). Voices from Two Rivers: Harnessing the Power of the Peace and Columbia. Vancouver: Douglas & McIntyre. ISBN 9781553654957.
