= Gordon Shrum =

Canadian scientist, teacher and administrator

Chancellor of Simon Fraser University
- In office 1963–1968

Personal details
- Born: Gordon Merritt Shrum; January 14, 1896 Smithville, Ontario
- Died: June 20, 1985 (aged 89) Vancouver, British Columbia
- Education: Victoria College

Gordon Merritt Shrum OC OBE MM (January 14, 1896 – June 20, 1985) was a Canadian scientist, teacher, administrator, and the first Chancellor of Simon Fraser University.

== Early life ==
Shrum was born in Smithville, Ontario, the son of Emma Jane (née Merritt) and William Burton Shrum. His education at Victoria College at the University of Toronto, where he started in 1913, was interrupted by World War I. A friend of Lester (Mike) Pearson, he was in his Canadian Officers Training Corps (C.O.T.C.) unit starting in 1914. Their company commander was Vincent Massey.

== Career ==
=== Military ===
On April 1, 1916, he enlisted in the army. He was a gunner and fought at the Battle of Vimy Ridge. He received the Military Medal during the war.

=== Academia ===
After the war, he continued his education and received a Bachelor of Arts in 1919, a Master of Arts in 1921. As a doctoral student in February 1923 he was the first to replicate Kamerlingh Onnes's 1908 Nobel Prize–winning feat of liquefying helium. Later that year he was awarded his Doctorate in physics for studies of the hydrogen spectrum. As a post-doctoral fellow he was the first to identify the prominent green line in the Aurora Borealis as due to oxygen.

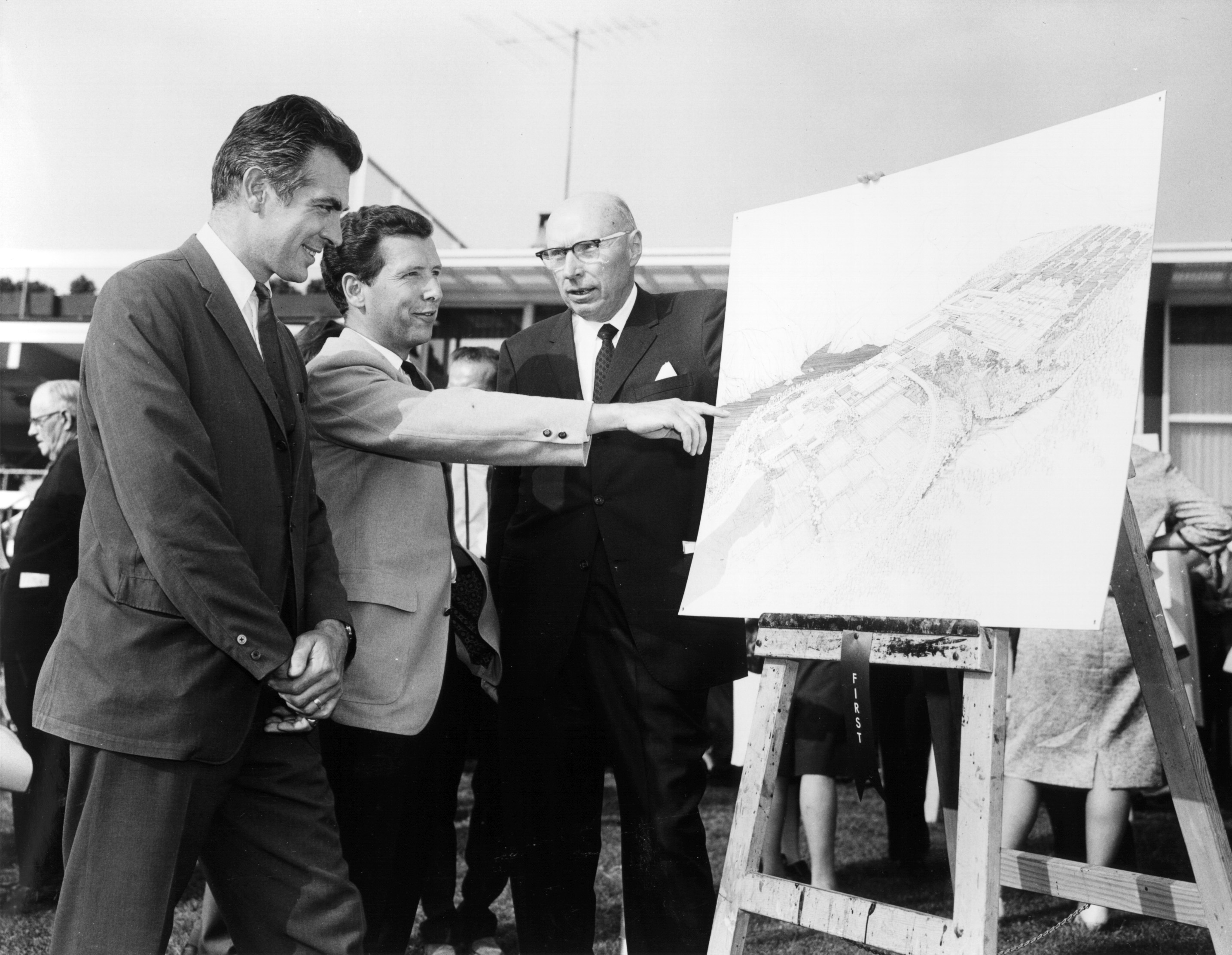
SFU Architects and President Shrum

In 1925, he joined the faculty at the University of British Columbia (UBC) where he taught physics. In 1935 he was elected a Fellow of the Royal Society of Canada. From 1938 to 1961, he was the head of the Physics Department. Circa 1945-1950, he was also Director of Emergency Housing, allocating former WWII Army huts for faculty and staff housing on campus in Acadia Camp and Fort Camp. From 1957 to 1961, he was the Dean of Graduate Studies and served on the Senate of the University. However, he was forced to retire at the age of 65 due to their rules.

In 1958, he was chairman of a royal commission investigating the BC Power Commission. He was also named a member of the Order of the British Empire. After retiring from UBC, he was appointed head of BC Electric by Premier W.A.C. Bennett and was involved with the Peace River hydro project. This project comprised the construction of the W.A.C. Bennett Dam, which impounds Williston Lake Reservoir, and the construction of a 2730 MW powerhouse (at that time the largest in the world) named after him: the G.M. Shrum Generating Station. In 1969, he was the recipient of Electrical Man of the Year. He stayed at BC Hydro until 1972.

During this time, Shrum was also involved in establishing Simon Fraser University and served as its first chancellor from 1963 to 1968. During this time, he was appointed an Officer of the Order of Canada. A few years later, in 1975, he was appointed Director of the Vancouver Museum and Planetarium Association. In 1986, he wrote his autobiography with Peter Stursberg, called Gordon Shrum: An Autobiography.

Shrum died in Vancouver, British Columbia, at age 89.

Academic offices
Preceded by New position	Chancellor of Simon Fraser University; January 1, 1964 – May 31, 1968	Succeeded by Kenneth P. Caple
