= Halfway River =

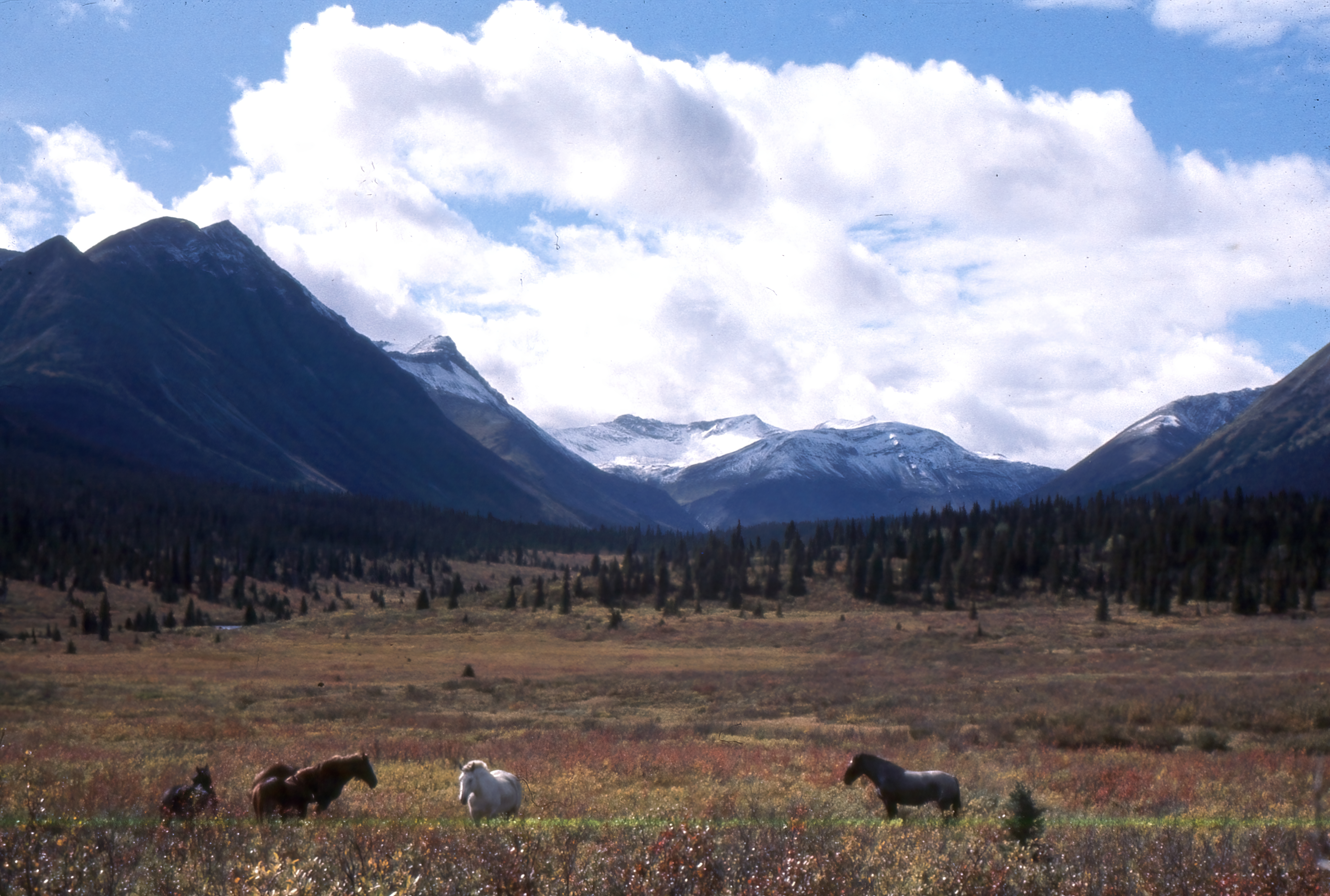

Location
- Country: Canada
- Province: British Columbia
- District: Peace River Land District

Physical characteristics
- Source
  - location: Muskwa Ranges
  - coordinates: 56.90314°N 123.78038°W
  - elevation: 1,500 meters (4,900 ft)
- Mouth
  - location: Peace River
  - coordinates: 56.21157°N 121.44618°W
  - elevation: 440 meters (1,440 ft)

The Halfway River is a tributary of the Peace River in northeastern British Columbia, Canada.

The river originates in the Muskwa Ranges at an elevation of 1,500 meters (4,900 ft). It flows from Robb Lake, between Mount Kenny and Mount Robb, then flows east to Pink Mountain. It continues south and south-west, paralleling the Alaska Highway, and flows into the Peace River downstream of Hudson's Hope and upstream from Taylor, at an elevation of 440 meters (1,440 ft).

The Halfway River First Nation is established on the banks of the river.

== See also ==
- List of rivers of British Columbia
