= Lake Claire (Alberta) =

Lake in Alberta, Canada

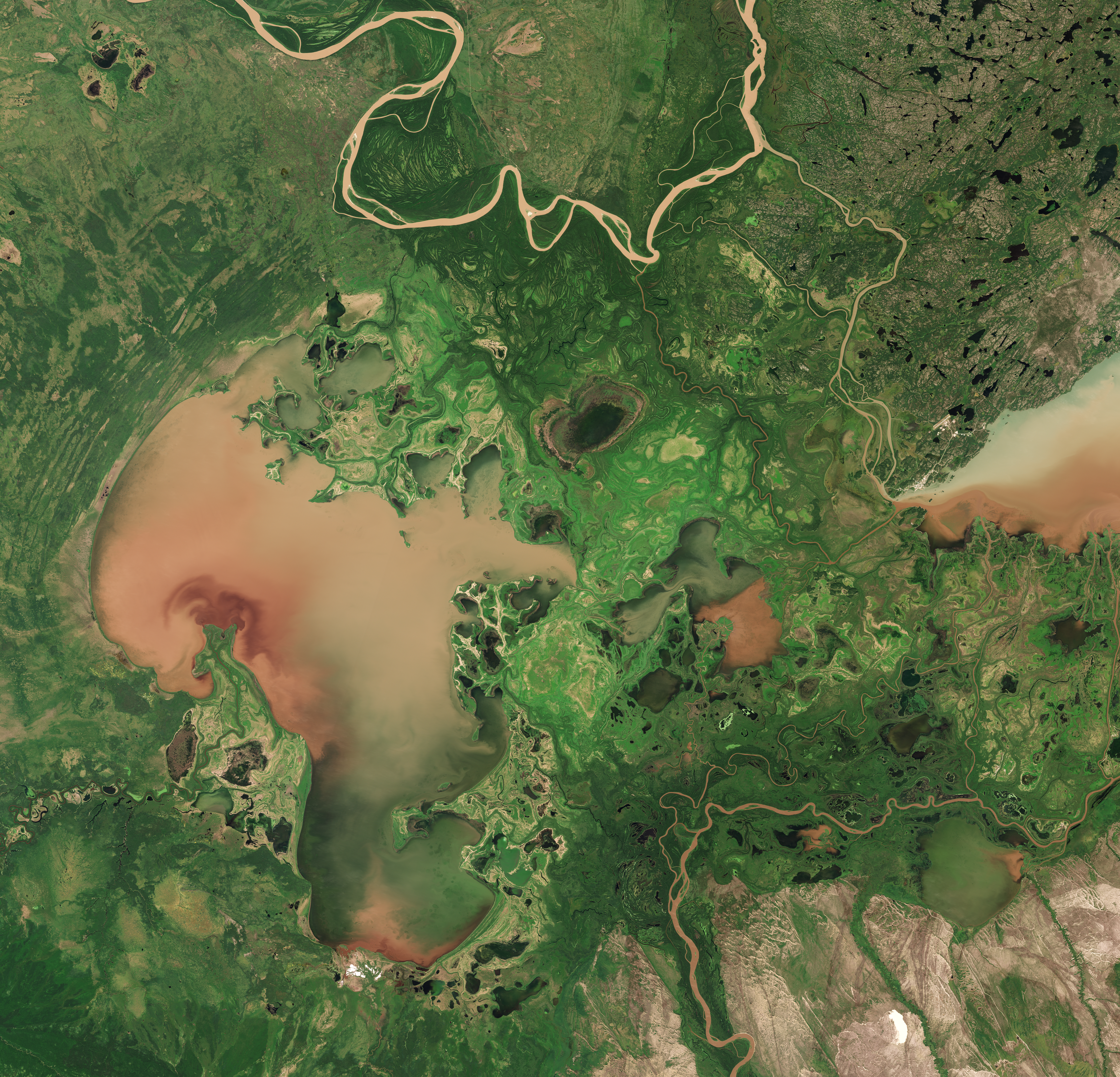
- Peace-Athabasca Delta with Lake Claire, west end of Lake Athabasca and mouths of Peace River (north) and Athabasca River(south)
- Interactive map of Lake Claire
- Location: Wood Buffalo National Park, Alberta
- Coordinates: 58°35′N 112°05′W
- Primary inflows: Birch River, McIvor River
- Primary outflows: Peace River
- Basin countries: Canada
- Max. length: 59 km (37 mi)
- Max. width: 45 km (28 mi)
- Surface area: 1,436 km^{2} (554 sq mi)
- Surface elevation: 213 m (699 ft)

Lake Claire is the largest lake which is entirely in Alberta, Canada. It is located entirely in Wood Buffalo National Park, west of Lake Athabasca. It lies between the mouths of Peace River and Athabasca River, and is part of the Peace-Athabasca Delta system.

The lake has a total area of 1,436 km^{2} (554 sq mi), with 21 km^{2} (8.1 sq mi) island area, and lies at an elevation of 213 m (699 ft). It is the largest lake located entirely within Albertan boundaries. While Lake Athabasca covers a larger area within Alberta, its total area straddles the border with Saskatchewan.

The lake is fed by Birch River and McIvor River, and the lake system also contains Baril Lake and Mamawi Lake. The waters are discharged in the Peace River, finding their way to the Arctic Ocean through the Slave River, Great Slave Lake and Mackenzie River.

== See also ==
- Lakes of Alberta
