= Beryl Prairie =

- Location of Beryl Prairie in British Columbia
- Coordinates: 56°05′00″N 122°02′00″W
- Country: Canada
- Province: British Columbia
- Area codes: 250, 778

Beryl Prairie is a locality in the Peace River Country of British Columbia, Canada, located just northwest of the town of Hudson's Hope, between Portage and Brenot Creeks. It has about 300 people. It encompasses various sectors such as agriculture, logging, and oil. The community prudently manages its water supply and operates a fire hall that relies on the commitment of volunteer firefighters. It also benefits from its proximity to Farrell Creek Road, positioned approximately 40 km from the area.
