= Butler Ridge Provincial Park =

Provincial park in British Columbia

- IUCN category II (national park)
- Location within British Columbia
- Interactive map of Butler Ridge Provincial Park
- Location: Peace River Land District, British Columbia, Canada
- Nearest city: Hudson's Hope, BC
- Coordinates: 56°11′N 122°18′W
- Area: 6,024 ha (14,890 acres)
- Established: June 29, 2000
- Governing body: BC Parks

Butler Ridge Provincial Park is a provincial park in British Columbia, Canada. Located on the northern shore of the Peach Reach arm of Williston Lake, 20 km northwest of Hudson's Hope, the park covers an area of 6,694 ha. Within the Peace Foothills ecosection, it includes three biogeoclimatic zones: the Engelmann Spruce-Subalpine Fir, the Sub-Boreal Spruce, and the Black and White Boreal Spruce zones. This cold and moist area is used as winter ranges by caribou, Stone's sheep, moose, and elk. It is recognized by the province and the Treaty 8 Tribal Association as an area that has traditionally been used by First Nations people. The park is used for fishing, hunting, trapping, hiking, and wildlife/nature viewing, cross-country skiing. There is a boat launch for Williston Lake, and motorized recreation (ATV, snowmobile is permitted on designated trails).
