= Daniel Sims =

Canadian historian

Daniel Chester Forest Sims is a Canadian historian specializing in the history of northern British Columbia. Born and brought up in Prince George, he is a member of the Tsay Keh Dene First Nation. He received his Ph.D. in history from the University of Alberta in 2017 with a dissertation, nominated for the Governor-General's Gold Medal, entitled Dam Bennett: The Impact of the W. A. C. Bennett Dam and Williston Lake Reservoir on the Tsek'ehne of Northern British Columbia.

He is Associate Professor of First Nations Studies at the University of Northern British Columbia, where he served as Chair from 2020 to 2022, and a member of the council of the Canadian Historical Association. He was previously assistant professor of history at the University of Alberta – Augustana campus.

On February 1, 2023, he became academic co-lead, together with Sheila Blackstock, of the National Collaborating Centre for Indigenous Health.

== Selected publications ==
- “Balloon Bombs, the Alaskan Highway and Influenza: Tsek’ehne Perspectives of the 1943 Flu Epidemic,” BC Studies, no. 203 (2019): 111-130.
- “Accrued Many Rights: The Ingenika Tsay Keh Nay, Mennonite Missionaries, and Land Claims in the Late Twentieth Century,” Journal of Mennonite Studies 37 (2019): 87-104.
- “‘Not That Kind of Indian:’ The Problem with Generalizing Indigenous Peoples in Contemporary Scholarship and Pedagogy.” Active History.ca 12 January 2017.
- “Ware’s Waldo: Hydroelectric Development and the Creation of the Other in British Columbia,” in Sustaining the West: Cultural Responses to Western Environments, Past and Present. Eds. Liza Piper and Lisa Szabo-Jones (Waterloo: Wilfrid Laurier Press, 2015).
