= Birch River (Alberta) =

River in Alberta, Canada

Coordinates: 58°35′26″N 112°17′48″W

The Birch River is a river of Alberta, Canada. It starts in the Birch Mountains then flows eastward into Lake Claire, where it forms a small delta.

== See also ==
- List of rivers of Alberta
