= Boyer River (Alberta) =

Stream in Alberta, Canada

Coordinates: 58.45019°N 115.95261°W

Boyer River is a stream in Alberta, Canada.

Boyer River may have the name of Charles Boyer, an 18th-century trader.

== See also ==
- List of rivers of Alberta
