= McIvor River =

River in Alberta, Canada

- Location of mouth in Alberta

Location
- Country: Canada
- Province: Alberta

Physical characteristics
- Mouth
  - coordinates: 58.30023°N 112.052°W

The McIvor River is a river of Alberta, Canada. It is flows into Lake Claire.
