= Peace Canyon Dam =

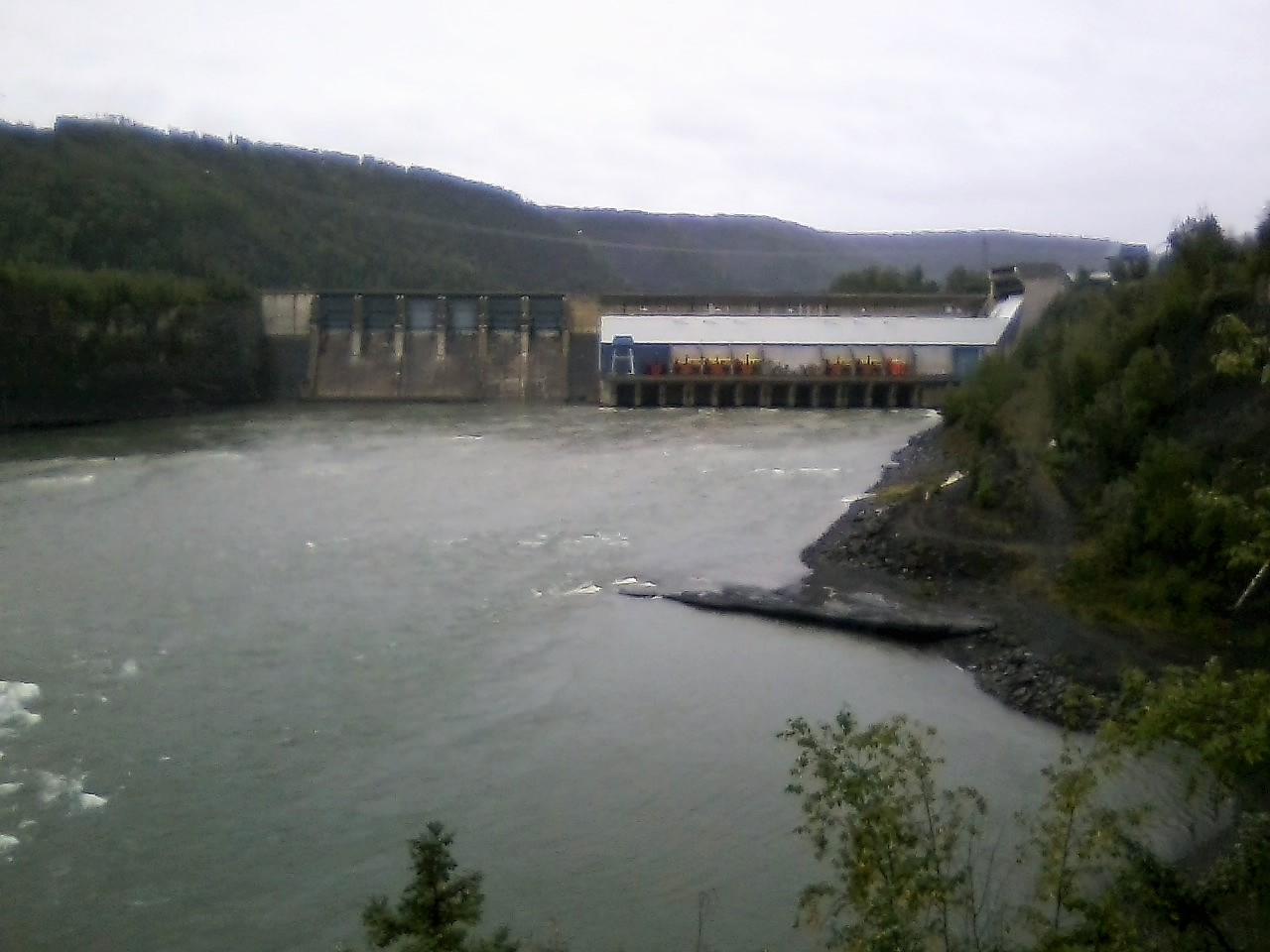

- Location within British Columbia
- Location: Hudson's Hope, British Columbia, Canada
- Coordinates: 55°58′55″N 121°59′40″W
- Owner: BC Hydro

Dam and spillways
- Impounds: Peace River

Reservoir
- Creates: Dinosaur Lake

Power Station
- Installed capacity: 694 MW
- Capacity factor: 57.6%
- Annual generation: 3,500 GWh

The Peace Canyon Dam is a large hydroelectric dam on the Peace River in northern British Columbia, Canada. It is located 6 km (4 mi) southwest of Hudson's Hope, 23 km (14 mi) downstream from the W.A.C. Bennett Dam.

The 50 m (164 ft) high concrete dam, completed in 1980, impounds a 21 km (13 mi) long reservoir, called Dinosaur Lake. Together, the four generating units of the complex have a peak capacity of 700 MW, and typically produce over 3,500 GWh of electricity per year.

While there are no guided tours at the Peace Canyon Dam and entry to the building is off-limits, however it does have a viewing deck,picnic tables and panels containing information about the Dam.

== See also ==
- List of electrical generating stations in Canada
- List of generating stations in BC
