= Site E dam =

Site E dam is a proposed dam site in North East British Columbia on the Peace River. The idea of the dam was first proposed in 1958. While development of the idea was stopped in the 1980s, consideration began again in 2026.
