= Hudson's Hope =

- District municipality
- District of Hudson's Hope
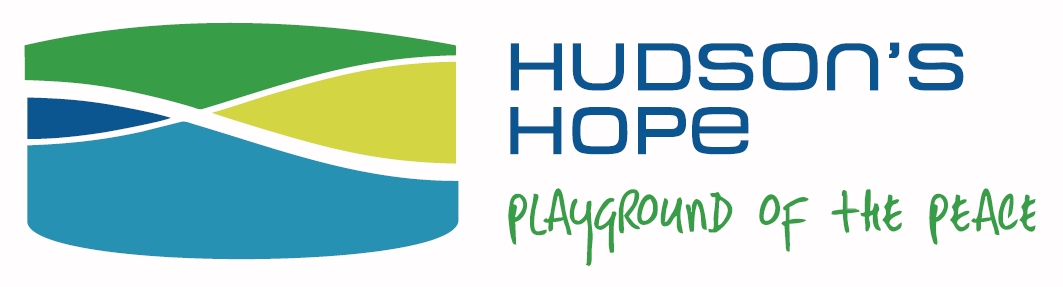

- Location of Hudson's Hope within British Columbia
- Coordinates: 56°01′53.9″N 121°54′20.6″W
- Country: Canada
- Province: British Columbia
- Regional District: Peace River
- Settled: 1805
- Incorporated: 1965

Government
  - Mayor: Travous Quibell
  - Governing body
  - MP: Bob Zimmer
  - MLA: Jordan Kealy

Area
  - Total: 826.7 km^{2} (319.2 sq mi)
- Elevation: 671 m (2,201 ft)

Population (2021)
  - Total: 841
  - Density: 1.02/km^{2} (2.63/sq mi)
- Time zone: UTC−07:00 (PT)
- Postal code span: VOC 1VO
- Area codes: 250, 778, 236, & 672
- Highways: Highway 29
- Website: Official website

Hudson's Hope is a district municipality in northeastern British Columbia, Canada, in the Peace River Regional District. Having been first settled along the Peace River in 1805, it is the third-oldest European-Canadian community in the province, although it was not incorporated until 1965. Most jobs in the economy are associated with the nearby W. A. C. Bennett Dam and Peace Canyon Dam, and timber logging.

There is debate about the origin of Hudson's Hope's name. One theory derives the word "Hudson's" from the Hudson's Bay Company and "Hope" from the Scottish word "hope" meaning a "small enclosed valley". Another theory has the name derived from a prospector named Hudson who came to the area searching for gold. The District of Hudson's Hope slogan is the "Playground of the Peace".

== History ==
Nomadic aboriginal Dene zaa tribes originally occupied the area. Alexander Mackenzie and his team of voyageurs became the first Europeans to travel through as they canoed westward along the Peace River in 1793. Simon Fraser followed in 1805 and established a North West Company fur-trading outpost, the Rocky Mountain Portage House, at the foot of the canyon directly across the river from the current townsite. This was the only significant portage site on the Peace River between Fort Chipewyan and Fort McLeod.

The Hudson's Bay Company took control of the fort after merging with the North West Company in 1821 but abandoned it in 1823 after a massacre in the nearby Fort St. John outpost. The HBC opened a new trading post on the southern river banks in 1866 to compete against free traders coming in from the west. (Hudson's Bay Company Archives B.39/b/18 p. 57) Though its origins are unclear, the name Hudson's Hope was first recorded in 1868. Theories on its origin include an explorer named Hudson searching for the Northwest Passage, or a prospector named Henry Hudson searching for gold, or the use of the English and Scottish word hope, meaning a small enclosed valley. In 1899 the fort was moved to the townsite's present-day location on the north bank to better serve those portaging northwestwards.

Much of the area was explored by prospectors and surveying crews as the Peace River Block was opened to mineral staking in 1908 and homestead claims in 1912. A permanent settlement was established in 1912 by a police officer, who was previously stationed in Fort St. John, and a friend from Victoria, who staked the first homestead. Others joined them as they travelled through Edmonton, Dunvegan, and Fort St. John to found the communities of Beryl Prairie and Lynx Creek. Soon, as other settlers came, they built a post office, hotel, and church around the trading post. In 1923 settlers opened the first school. Coal was discovered a few years earlier and used locally. Commercial coal mining, attempted in 1923, was not successful due to the isolation and high transportation costs to other markets. Construction of the Alaska Highway in 1942 created a high local demand and stimulated commercial coal mining.

Major development came to the rural area in the 1960s, when the provincial government planned and constructed the W. A. C. Bennett Dam and its associated Gordon M. Shrum Generating Station for hydroelectric power. Its construction involved thousands of workers; the project was served by the distant highway and railway 85 km (53 mi) to the south at Chetwynd. To help organize and finance the project, the Hudson's Hope Improvement District was incorporated in 1962 and the District Municipality of Hudson's Hope was incorporated 2 years later. The two incorporated areas merged in 1967 after construction was completed. As the reservoir was filled and the dam went online in 1968, most of the thousands of workers left for other areas.

Soon afterwards a second dam, the Peace Canyon Dam, was planned and constructed, several kilometers downstream from the first. The second dam went online in 1980. The town has remained geographically isolated and is economically dependent on BC Hydro as its single major employer. It has marketed its isolation and extensive outdoor recreational opportunities as a benefit to living in the area.

== Geography and climate ==
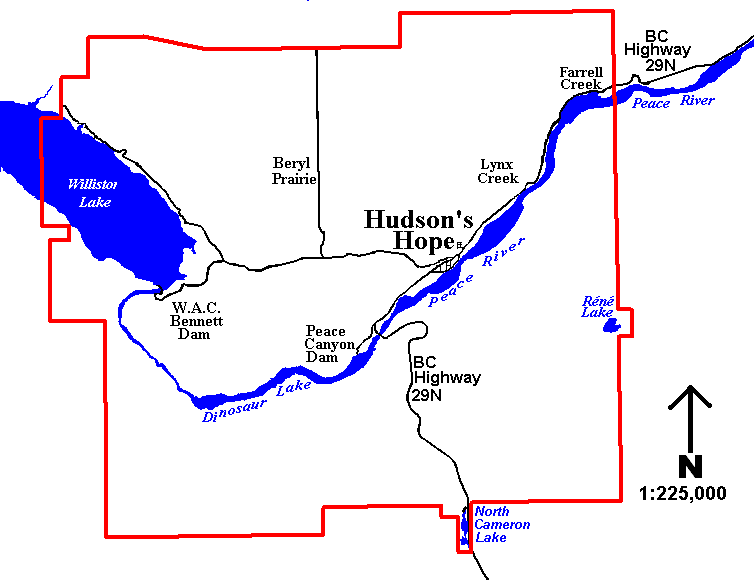
The District of Hudson's Hope is centered around a townsite on the north side of the Peace River along Highway 29. The rural communities of Lynx Creek and Farrell Creek, and the farming community of Beryl Prairie, are located north of the main townsite.

The main townsite is 3 km (2 mi) wide, 8 km (5 mi) long flat along the north bank of the Peace River, and the rural communities of Beryl Prairie, Lynx Creek, and Farrell Creek. The Peace River originates at the W.A.C. Bennett Dam from the Peace Reach Arm of Williston Lake and flows around the 1,427 m (4,682 ft) tall Portage Mountain and through Dinosaur Lake. The water is retained here for three days before being released to the Peace Canyon Dam. It flows northeastward past the townsite, and the rural communities of Lynx Creek and Farrell Creek, and eventually into the Arctic Ocean. The Hudson's Hope Suspension Bridge provides passage over the river near the town. The forested foothills of the Rocky Mountains, including Mount Johnson and the 1,230 m (4,035 ft) Two Ridge Mountain, dominate the area south of the Peace River. The foothills continue north of the river, passing into prairie land at Beryl Prairie.

Dinosaur Lake is the deeply entrenched reservoir of the Peace Canyon Dam, having a surface area of 805 ha (3 sq mi) and a volume of 0.216 km^{3} (0.052 mi^{3}). The oligotrophic lake is fed by Williston Lake and 5 tributaries (Gething, Johnson, Moosebar, Starfish and Mogul creeks).

Most of the municipality is forested by aspen and poplar trees. Animals common to the area include moose, bear, deer, sheep, goats and elk. A hatchery annually releases sportsfish, mainly rainbow trout, into the lakes. Dinosaur tracks and fossils have been discovered in the municipality, including deposits that were later covered by the filling of Dinosaur Lake. The ichthyosaur Hudsonelpidia was named after the community after being discovered there in the 1960s.

Census population: Hudson's Hope
Year	Pop.	±%
1966	3,068	—
1971	1,741	−43.3%
1976	1,330	−23.6%
1981	1,365	+2.6%
1986	1,158	−15.2%
1991	985	−14.9%
1996	1,122	+13.9%
2001	1,039	−7.4%
2006	1,012	−2.6%
2011	970	−4.2%
2016	1,015	+4.6%
2021	841	−17.1%
Source: Statistics Canada

Historically, winters have been very cold and snowy. However, since the filling of Williston Lake, the largest man-made lake in North America, the winters have been milder with an average January temperature of −15 °C (5 °F) and annual snowfall of 194 cm (76 in). The municipality has an average growing season of 135 days, the longest in northern BC, with an average July temperature of 15 °C (59 °F). With the dams, both the lakes and the river are isothermal at about 2 to 10 °C (36 to 50 °F).

== Demographics ==
In the 2021 Census of Population conducted by Statistics Canada, Hudson's Hope had a population of 841 living in 378 of its 460 total private dwellings, a change of −17.1% from its 2016 population of 1,015. With a land area of 826.7 km^{2} (319.2 sq mi), it had a population density of 1.0/km^{2} (2.6/sq mi) in 2021.

While the community is one of the province's oldest, the first census that included it as a defined subdivision was that of 1966, which recorded 3,068 people. An earlier report put the population at less than 100 in 1954. The 1960s peak was due to workers coming to the area for the planning and construction of the hydroelectric dam.

== Infrastructure ==
The road network of Hudson's Hope.

The town is located along Highway 29, between Chetwynd and Fort St. John. The highway crosses the Peace River via the Hudson's Hope Suspension Bridge and runs eastward along the north bank of the Peace River through the townsite, Lynx Creek, and Farrel Creek. From the townsite, the W.A.C. Bennett Dam is 22 km (14 mi) west. In total, the district maintains 33 km (21 mi) of paved and 27 km (17 mi) of unpaved roads with most of the businesses located along the Beattie Road portion of Highway 29. Community facilities and some residential areas are located between Beattie Road and the Peace River, and more residential areas are located on hills north of the downtown area.

The Hudson's Hope Airport, 6 km (4 mi) west of town, is a small airport with a 1,585 m (5,200 ft)-long paved runway that handles private and chartered flights. The closest commercial airport, with regularly scheduled flights, is approximately 86 km (53 mi) to the east, near Fort St. John. The closest regional bus stop and rail station is about 60 km (37 mi) to the south, in Chetwynd.

The town draws its drinking water from the Peace River, and chlorinates and distributes it through 15 km (9 mi) of watermains. Sewage is collected through 8 km (5 mi) of sanitary sewers and processed in a two-cell lagoon system. The municipality funds weekly garbage collection from households in the townsite and transfer stations in the rural communities. Electrical power is supplied by the provincially owned BC Hydro and natural gas by the privately owned Pacific Natural Gas.

== Economy and education ==
Hudson's Hope has a predominantly resource-based economy. The community was founded as a trading post along a portage trail but with sternwheelers and steamships navigating the Peace River in the 1800s resource extraction, such as logging and farming, began. The town's economy turned towards construction starting in the 1960s with the Bennett Dam followed by the Peace Canyon Dam. Additional staff have been employed with the dams’ museums and tour-related activities.

The only school in the municipality is the Hudson's Hope Elementary-Secondary School, administered by School District 60 Peace River North. The school, constructed in 1993, teaches students from kindergarten to grade 12 and has an enrollment of about 220 students. Northern Lights College offers courses at the Hudson's Hope Learning Centre that focus on the oil and gas industry, as well as adult basic, continuing, and vocational education.

== Culture and recreation ==
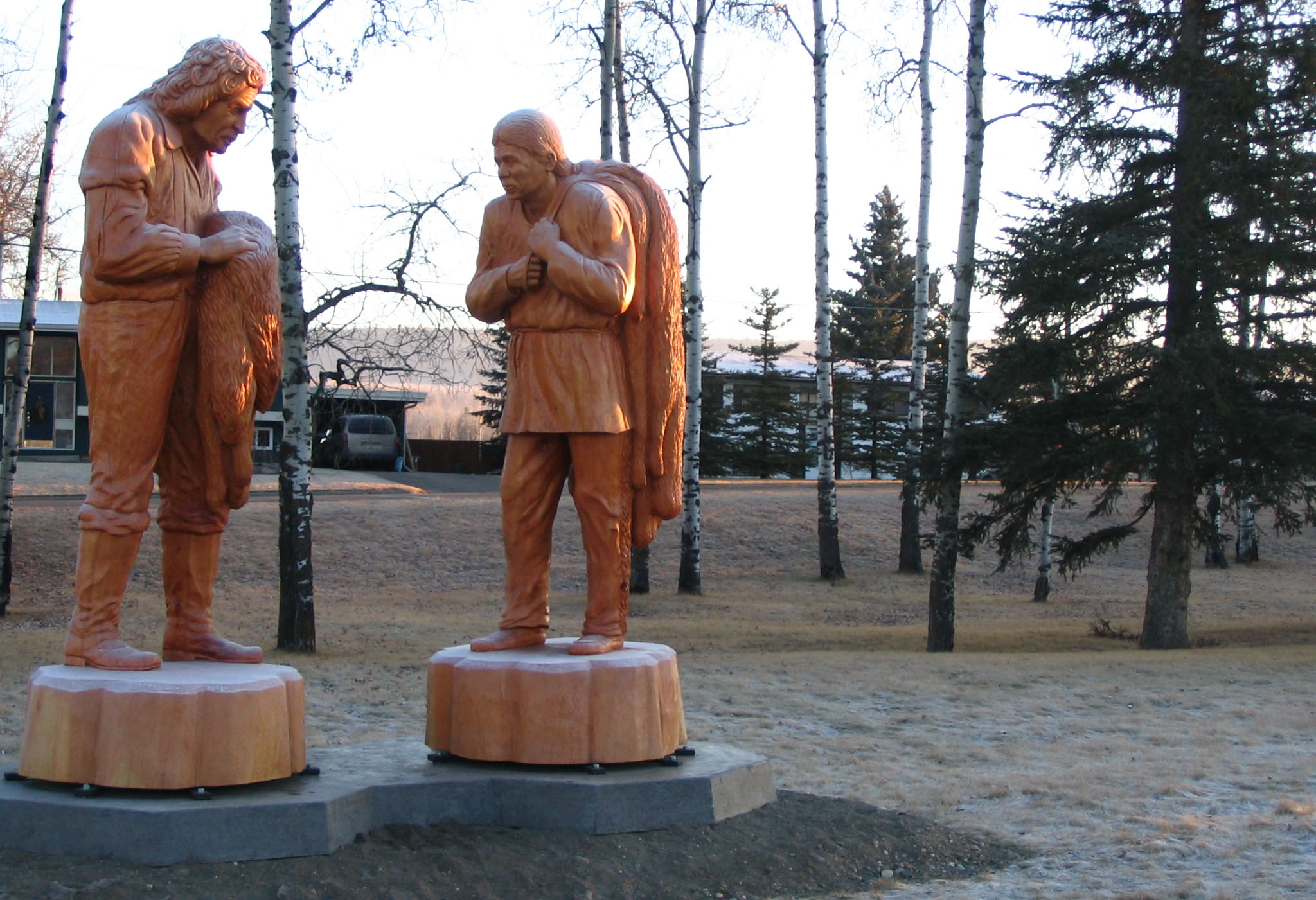
Chainsaw carvings in Stegge Park

The Hudson's Hope Museum is located in the old Hudson's Bay Store, built in 1942. It has exhibits on the area's prehistory (i.e. dinosaur fossils, bones and tracks), frontier times (i.e. aboriginal, North West Company and the Hudson's Bay Company artifacts), and boom times (i.e. construction of Bennett and Peace Canyon dams). Both dams have museums and offer tours. The museum at the Bennett Dam focuses on the massive engineering and construction programs to build the reservoir and world's largest earth-filled dam. The museum at the Peace Canyon Dam focuses on the natural history of the area, especially the dinosaur finds that were discovered during construction of the dam.

The town maintains a library, skating arena, curling rink, and an outdoor heated swimming pool. The Hudson's Hope Community Hall is used for theatrical performances, dances, and public meetings. Annual events include a rodeo in June, a fall fair in August, and a torchlight parade in December. The district operates three public parks: Beattie Park with a playground and visitor information centre, Centennial Park with its chainsaw carvings and totem poles, and Memorial Park with tennis courts, swimming pool and toboggan hill. Outside the townsite, the district helps maintain the Beryl Prairie Community Park, and Jamieson Woods Nature Preserve.

Williston Lake, Dinosaur Lake, Cameron Lake and the Peace River are used for canoeing, kayaking, sailing and fishing. In addition to private campgrounds, the district operates four campgrounds. King Gething Park and Alwin Holland Park, both named after 1920s–30s pioneers, are fully serviced campgrounds and RV parks on the north bank of the Peace River, west of the townsite. Dinosaur Lake Campground near the Peace Canyon dam and Cameron Lake Campground near North Cameron Lake were both taken over by the district in 1989 from the province.

== Government and politics ==
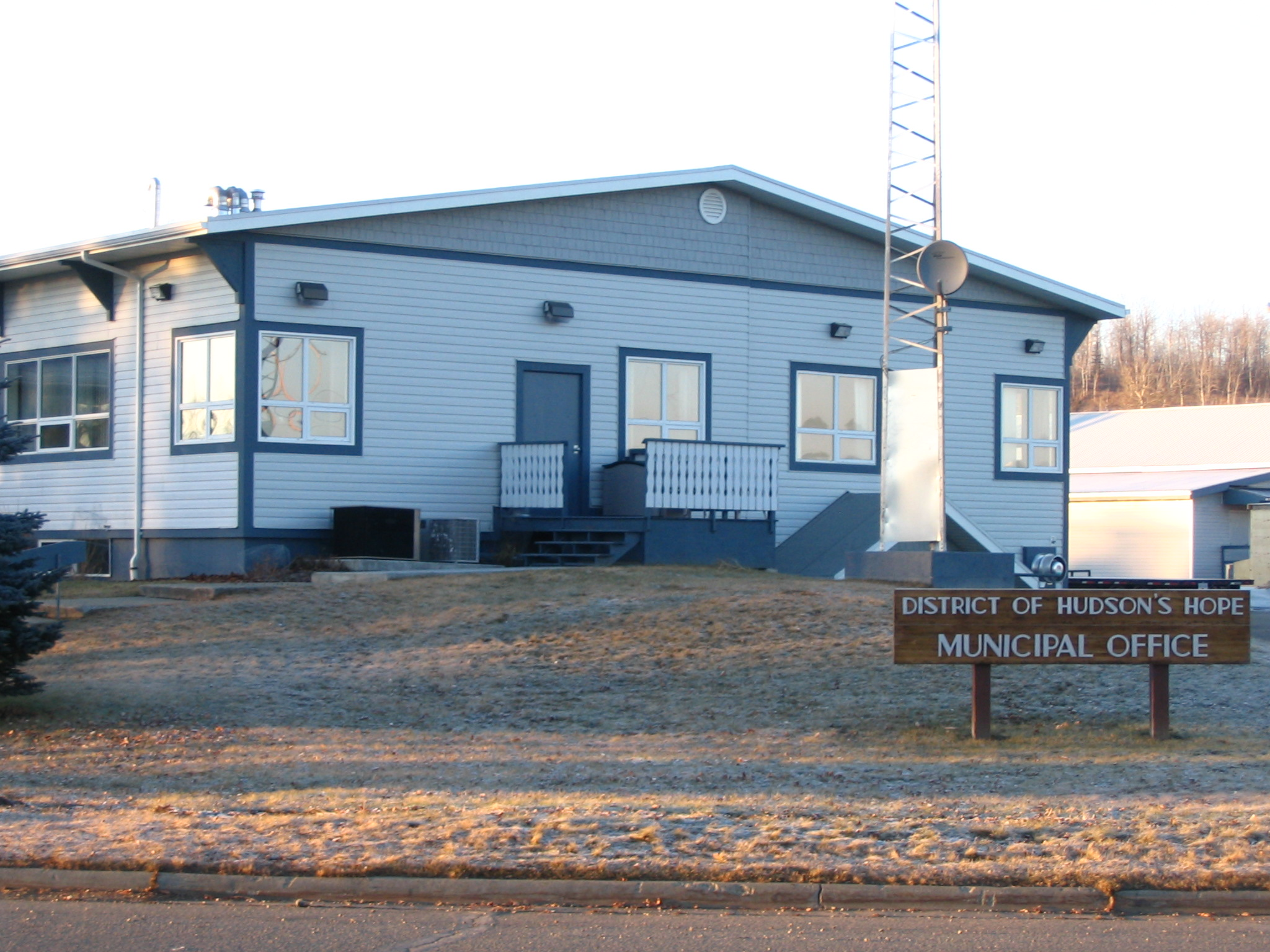
Dual purpose building: town hall and fire station

The District of Hudson's Hope has a council-manager form of municipal government. A mayor and six councillors are elected at-large every three years, along with one trustee to the school district. Such a system results in candidates who appeal to the majority of voters. In a December 2, 2012 by-election, Gwen Johansson was elected as the mayor of Hudson's Hope, replacing Karen Anderson. In November 2011 Karen Anderson had been elected mayor. She had first been elected mayor in 2008, defeating former mayor Lenore Harwood. The mayor is appointed by the council as the District's representative on the board of directors of the Peace River Regional District.

Hudson's Hope federal election results
Year	Liberal		Conservative		New Democratic		Green	
2021	8%	50	64%	421	9%	63	6%	37
2019	12%	65	66%	365	7%	40	11%	63

Hudson's Hope provincial election results
Year	New Democratic		Liberal		Green		Conservative		Independent	
2020	24%	77	32%	102	0%	0	43%	138	0%	0
2017	12%	59	40%	201	0%	0	0%	0	48%	244

Hudson's Hope is situated in the Peace River North provincial electoral district and is represented by Pat Pimm in the Legislative Assembly of British Columbia. Prior to Pimm, the town was represented by Richard Neufeld who was first elected as a Member of the Legislative Assembly in the 1991 provincial election with the BC Social Credit Party taking 31% of votes cast at the Hudson's Hope polls and re-elected with the Reform Party of BC in 1996 with 44% support, with the BC Liberal Party in 2001 and 2005 with 57% and 41% from Hudson's Hope polls, respectively.

Federally, Hudson's Hope is located in the Prince George—Peace River riding, which is represented in the House of Commons by Conservative Party Member of Parliament Bob Zimmer. Prior to Zimmer, the town was represented by Jay Hill who was first elected in 1993, then re-elected in 1997, 2000, 2004, and 2006 with 79%, 75%, 64%, and 66%. support from Hudson's Hope polls, respectively. Before Hill the riding was represented by Frank Oberle of the Progressive Conservative Party from 1972 to 1993. Oberle served as Minister of State for Science and Technology from 1985 to 1989 and Minister of Forestry from 1990 to 1993.

== See also ==
- Beryl Prairie, British Columbia
