= Dane-zaa language =

Athabaskan language of western Canada

Dane-zaa
- Beaver
- Dane-ẕaa Ẕáágéʔ (ᑕᓀᖚ ᖚᗀᐥ)
- Native to: Canada
- Region: British Columbia, Alberta
- Ethnicity: 1,700 Dane-zaa (2016)
- Native speakers: 220 (2021 census)
- Language family: Na-Dené: Athabaskan–Eyak; Athabaskan; Northern Athabaskan; Dane-zaa

Language codes
- ISO 639-3: bea
- Glottolog: beav1236
- ELP: Dane-Zaa (Beaver)
- Beaver is classified as Definitely Endangered by the UNESCO Atlas of the World's Languages in Danger.

- People: Dane-z̲aa ᑕᓀᖚ
- Language: Dane-z̲aa Ẕáágéʔ ᑕᓀᖚ ᖚᗀᐥ
- Country: Dane-z̲aa nanéʔ ᑕᓀᖚ ᖚᗀᐥ ᓇᓀᐥ, Denendeh ᑌᓀᐣᑌᐧ

Dane-zaa, known in the language as Dane-ẕaa Ẕáágéʔ (syll: ᑕᓀᖚ ᖚᗀᐥ), formerly known as Beaver, is an Athabascan language of western Canada. It means "people-regular language." About one-tenth of the Dane-zaa people speak the language.

Beaver is closely related to the languages spoken by neighbouring Athabaskan groups, such as Slavey, Sekani, Tsuu T’ina, Chipewyan, and Kaska.

== Dialects ==
The dialects of Dane-zaa language are two main groups. Dialects that developed high tone from stem-final glottalic consonants are called high-marked and dialects that developed low tone low-marked. From north to south are as follows:

- the High-marked Dane-zaa dialects:
  - Boyer River (Alberta) dialect is spoken by members of the Beaver First Nation
  - Child Lake (Alberta) dialect is spoken by members of the Beaver First Nation
  - Prophet River (British Columbia) dialect is spoken by members of the Prophet River First Nation
  - Blueberry River (British Columbia) dialect is spoken by members of the Blueberry River First Nation
  - Doig River (British Columbia) dialect is spoken by members of the Doig River First Nation
- the Low-marked Dane-zaa dialects:
  - Halfway River (British Columbia) dialect is spoken by members of the Halfway River First Nation
  - West Moberly Lake (British Columbia) dialect is spoken by members of the West Moberly First Nations

== Use and number of speakers ==
A 1991 estimate gave 300 total speakers out of a population of 600 Dane-zaa people. Leading up to 2007, Dane-zaa was "spoken in eastern British Columbia (in the communities of Doig River (Hanás̱ Saahgéʔ), Blueberry, Halfway River, Hudson Hope, and Prophet River) and in northwestern Alberta (in the communities of Horse Lakes, Clear Hills, Boyer River (Rocky Lane), Rock Lane, and Child Lake (Eleske) Reserves)."

A 2011 CD by Garry Oker features traditional Beaver language chanting with world beat and country music.

== Language loss ==
English is now the first language of most Dane-zaa children, and of many adults in the Dane-zaa communities. Dane-zaa was the primary language until the grandparents and parents started to send their children to school in the 1950s. English only became dominant in the 1980s. Because the language is orally based, Dane-zaa becomes increasingly endangered as the fluent speakers pass away. The 1918 Spanish flu epidemic was a contributor in language loss because it decimated the Dane-zaa population, claiming the lives of hunters, mothers and the older population. To fully recover from this, it took several generations. Because fluency lay in the older generation, the epidemic played a part in that loss of language. The loss of Suu Na Chii Kʼchinge, the traditional meeting place for the Dane-zaa, along with residential schools, resulted in the loss of language. As schools were built on the reserves, a lack of teachers due to the isolation as well as them being forbidden to write about the poverty and realities of colonial violence added to that loss.

== Language documentation ==
Alfred Garrioch (1848–1934) was a Christian missionary of the Anglican Church Mission Society (CMS) who worked with the Beaver. He was born in 1848 in what would later become Manitoba. In 1876, he established a CMS mission and Indian children training school at Fort Vermilion, under the name of Unjaga Mission. He learnt and analysed the Beaver language and translated the Gospel of Mark into Beaver. In the mid-1880s he visited England where he had his work in the Beaver language printed. In 1886 Garrioch returned to mission work among the Beaver Indians. In 1892 he returned to Manitoba. In 1905 he retired from active work and settled at Portage la Prairie, Manitoba. In 1925 he wrote two autobiographical accounts of his life called The Far and Furry North and in 1929 A Hatchet Mark in Duplicate. He died in 1934.

In 1885, the Society for Promoting Christian Knowledge (SPCK) published A Primer and a Vocabulary in the Beaver Indian Language. In 1886, SPCK published A Manual of Devotion in the Beaver Indian Language and also published Garrioch's Gospel of Mark in syllabic characters with syllabarium, supplementary syllabarium, chapter headings and illustrations. In 1886 the British and Foreign Bible Society (BFBS) published his Gospel of Mark as Ootech oochu Takehniya-Tinkles St. Mark in Roman characters without the illustrations. This has been digitised and is online on YouVersion and BibleSearch.

In 1959 and throughout the 1960s, anthropologist Robin Ridington began working with the Doig River First Nation on the documentation and recording of Dane-zaa. He returned in 1978 with his second wife Jillian Ridington and they worked with Howard Broomfield and linguist Billy Attachie. His daughter Amber Ridington collaborated with Dane-zaa youth and elders to create Dane Wajich: Dane-zaa Stories and Songs-Dreamers and the Land, a virtual library that has made Dane-zaa pronunciations and other resources on Dane-zaa culture available to the public.

In 1968, the Gospel of John, chapter 3, was translated by Marshall and Jean Holdstock and published as Lǫ́ǫ́se nadááse by Scripture Gift Mission.

In 2004–2011, the language as spoken by the elders of the Beaver First Nations communities in Alberta and British Columbia was collected as part of the DoBeS Beaver documentation project. The intent was to document an endangered language from a place names' perspective, collecting place names along with stories of culturally relevant locations and personal migration stories, allowing for the exploration of spatial expressions in the language. These materials, along with other grammatical and pedagogical items, are held in the DoBeS Archive and are available for download (subject to agreeing to the terms of access).

== Phonemes ==
=== Consonants ===
Dane-zaa has 35 consonants:

		Bilabial	Dental	Alveolar			Postalveolar / Palatal	Velar	Glottal
		Bilabial	Dental	plain	sibilant	lateral	Postalveolar / Palatal	Velar	Glottal
Nasal		m		n					
Plosive	unaspirated	p	ts̪	t	ts	tɬ	tʃ	k	ʔ
Plosive	aspirated		ts̪ʰ	tʰ	tsʰ	tɬʰ	tʃʰ	kʰ	ʔ
Plosive	ejective		ts̪ʼ	tʼ	tsʼ	tɬʼ	tʃʼ	kʼ	ʔ
Fricative	voiceless		s̪		s	ɬ	ʃ	(x)	h
Fricative	voiced		z̪		z	ɮ	ʒ	ɣ	
Approximant							j	w	

=== Vowels ===
Dane-zaa has 10 phonemic vowels.

		Front	Central	Back
Close	full	i		u
Close	reduced	ɪ		ʊ
Mid	oral	e		o
Mid	nasal	ẽ		õ
Open	reduced		ɜ	
Open	full		a	

Two vowels contrast oral and nasal qualities.

== Grammar ==
Dane-zaa has gender-neutral pronouns where less importance is put on the person.

- His/Her/It: ma-
- His/Her own: da-

== Bibliography ==
- "Bibliography of Materials on the Beaver Language". Yinka Déné Language Institute. 2012.
- "Dane Wajich-Dane-ẕaa Stories and Songs-Dreamers and the Land". Doig River First Nation. 2007. Archived from the original on 2017-03-01.
- Randoja, Tiina Kathryn (1990). The Phonology and Morphology of Halfway River Beaver (PhD dissertation). University of Ottawa. hdl:10393/5749.
- Story, Gillian (1989). "Problems of Phonemic Representation in Beaver". In Cook, Eung-Do; Rice, Keren (eds.). Athapaskan Linguistics: Current Perspectives on a Language Family. Berlin: Mouton de Gruyter. pp. 63–98.
- Ridington, Robin; Ridington, Jillian (2006). When You Sing It Now, Just Like New: First Nations Poetics, Voices, and Representation. Lincoln: University of Nebraska Press.
- Ridington, Robin; Ridington, Jillian (2013). Where Happiness Dwells: A History of the Dane-zaa First Nations. Vancouver: UBC Press.
