= Art Napoleon =

Indigenous Canadian folk singer and TV personality

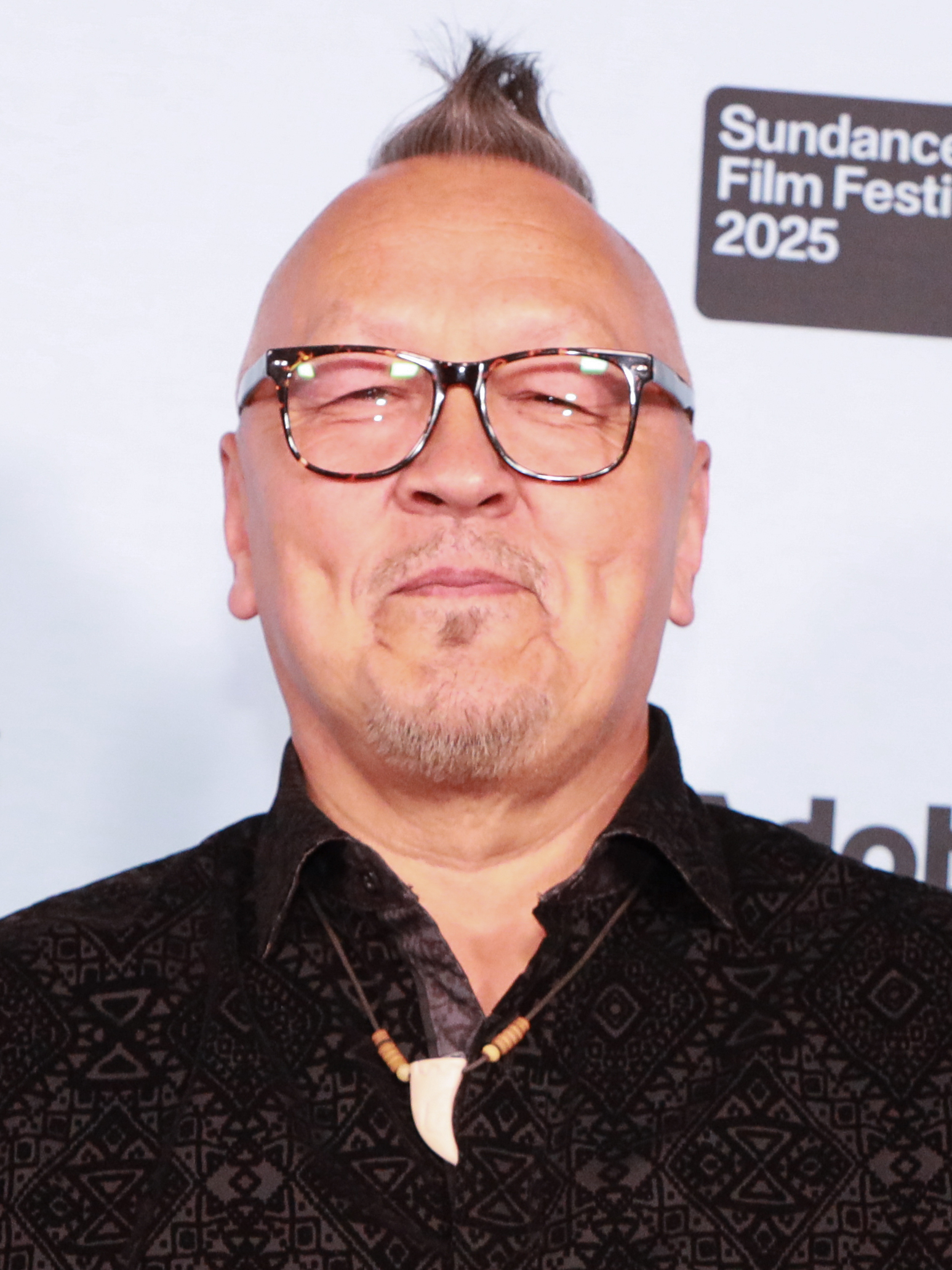
- Napoleon at the 2025 Sundance Film Festival

Background information
- Also known as: Âciw; Sunchild
- Born: 1961 (age 64–65); Moberly Lake, British Columbia
- Origin: Moberly Lake, British Columbia
- Genres: Country; folk
- Occupations: Singer-songwriter; actor; author; bush cook; activist; speaker
- Instruments: Vocals; guitar; harmonica; hand-drums
- Years active: 1995–present
- Label: Sunchild Records
- Website: https://www.artnapoleon.com/

Art Napoleon is a former chief of the Saulteau First Nation, from Victoria, British Columbia. He has used his television shows, music, and books to provide education on and increase awareness of Indigenous foods, languages, and cultures. He is co-host of the popular cooking show, "Moosemeat & Marmalade", and has appeared in other programs that promote and support Indigenous languages and cultures. Napoleon has also recorded several award-winning music albums.

== Early life ==
Art Napoleon was born in the Saulteau First Nation on Moberly Lake, British Columbia, in 1961. His mother died when he was a baby. As such, he was raised by his grandparents, who taught him to speak Cree, hunt, and fish. He credits his grandmother and aunt with teaching him how to cook. Napoleon began working as a bush cook at the age of fifteen. He attended the University of Victoria, where he graduated with a Masters of Arts degree in Indigenous Language Revitalization.

== Career ==
=== Activism and politics ===
Art Napoleon was a former Chief of the Saulteau First Nation (see West Moberly First Nations) and has been consulted as a cultural advisor for archeological findings in northeastern British Columbia. Napoleon led an educational training camp on First Nations traditions that was facilitated by the Treaty 8 Tribal Association.

Art Napoleon was a leading figure in the protests of the construction of the Site C dam, participating in the summit, and signing a letter to "BC Hydro CEO Jessica McDonald, Premier Christy Clark and Prime Minister Justin Trudeau". Napoleon helped organize the Rocky Mountain Fort protest camp. Napoleon and other elders expressed the belief that Treaty 8 had been repeatedly undermined and that the dam was one of many examples. At least three of the protestors participating in a road block were arrested. Many of the protestors were sued by BC Hydro and were accused of "conspiracy, intimidation, trespassing, creating a public and a private nuisance, and intentionally interfering with economic relations by unlawful means", but Art Napoleon was not targeted, despite his involvement.

=== Television career ===
Art Napoleon was cast in the third season of the children's television show "Tiga Talks!", a program which served to improve children's language skills and introduce them to media in aboriginal languages. During the filming of the show, Napoleon met Dan Hayes, who had been catering for the set. Napoleon had been considering a comedy cooking show that would "juxtapose" his rustic "bush cooking" with the food preparation of a trained chef, and approached Hayes with his idea.

As a result of their conversation, the first season of Moosemeat & Marmalade was filmed in 2015 and was funded by the Aboriginal Peoples Television Network, the Bell Fund, the Canadian Media Fund, and the Government of Nunavut. The show focused on the collaboration and competition between Art Napoleon with his traditional outdoors "bush cook" approach to cooking and co-host Dan Hayes' classically trained British cooking style. The show continued to be hosted on Aboriginal Peoples Television Network, and Napoleon translated each episode into Cree. Each episode of the show was set in a different community across Canada and the United Kingdom. Most of the ingredients cooked in the show were obtained by the hosts through hunting, gathering, or fishing. Napoleon regularly emphasized conservationism, food security and sustainability, and other ethical considerations of cooking, and he has been noted as an important figure in the indigenous food sovereignty movement more broadly. Seasons one and two focused on hunting and gathering whereas season three focused on river food, lake food, seafood, and fishing. Season four focused on experimental foods.

=== Music career ===
Art Napoleon released his debut album, Outta the Woods in 1995. He released his second album, Miyôskamin in 2006; it received playtime on CBC's Galaxy Folk-Roots radio program and won two Aboriginal People's Choice Awards. Napoleon released his third album Mocikan: Songs for Learning Cree in 2008, which was nominated for best children's recording at the Western Canadian Music Awards. His fourth album, Siskabush Tales was released later the same year and received "best country album and best folk/acoustic album" at the Canadian Aboriginal Music Awards. Napoleon released a covers album in 2010 entitled Creeland Covers.

== Personal life ==
Art Napoleon has two sons and four daughters. His son, Julian Napoleon, is a conservationist and caribou guardian. His daughter, Niska Napoleon, has pursued a musical career and is outspoken on issues of domestic abuse. His daughter, Quanah Style, has pursued a career in music, acting, and dancing and is outspoken on issues concerning transgender or two-spirit people and drag. Both Niska and Quanah, along with their father, formed The Napoleon Collective, which released a self-titled album in 2012.

== Filmography ==
Year	Title	Role	Notes
2002	Cree for Kids	Host	Awarded the Telefilm-APTN award for best Aboriginal production at the Banff Television Festival
2002	The New Canoe	Himself / co-host	Nominated for Best Performance or Host(s) in a Music, Comedy, or Variety Program or Series
2008-2011	Tiga Talk!	Dad	
2010-2013	Down2Earth	Himself / co-host	
2015-2019	Moosemeat & Marmalade: Food for Thought	Himself / co-host	Nominated for the 2015 and 2017 Best Documentary Series Leo Award
2024	Inkwo for When the Starving Return		Voice role, animated short film

== Published works ==
=== Non-fiction ===
- The NESA Activities Handbook for Native and Multicultural Classrooms (2010), ReadHowYouWant.com ISBN 978-1-458-78301-1
- Dancing Towards the Sky: David Meeko's Journey with AIDS (1998), Twin Sisters Publishers ISBN 978-0-969-65098-0

== Discography ==
=== Studio albums ===
- Outta the Woods (1995)
- Miyôskamin (2006)
- Mocikan: Songs for Learning Cree (2008)
- Siskabush Tales (2008)
- Creeland Covers (2010)

=== With the Napoleon Collective ===
- The Napoleon Collective (2012)

== See also ==
- Cree
- Site C dam
- Indigenous music of North America
- Indigenous music of Canada
- List of people from British Columbia
