= Doig =

Doig may refer to:

== Places ==
- Doig, Alberta, Canada, an unincorporated community
- Doig Airport, a remote forest fire suppression airfield in northwestern Alberta, Canada
- Doig River, a river in Alberta and northern British Columbia, Canada
- Daugai (Yiddish: Doig), Lithuania, a small city

== People ==
- Doig (surname)

== Other uses ==
- Doig Formation, a stratigraphical unit of middle Triassic age in the Western Canadian Sedimentary Basin
- Doig Medal, an award for the Fremantle Football Club in the Australian Football League
