= Hudson Hope Indian Band =

Hudson Hope Indian Band may refer to:

- Halfway River First Nation before 1971
- West Moberly First Nations before 1971
