= Danezaa =

Danezaa may refer to:

- Danezaa people, an ethnic group of the Athabaskan people
- Danezaa language, spoken by the Danezaa
