= Sulphur Mountain Formation =

Geologic formation of Canada

- Stratigraphic range: Early to Middle Triassic
- Type: Geological formation
- Unit of: Spray River Group
- Sub-units: Phroso Member; Mackenzie Dolomite; Vega Member; Whistler Member; Llama Member
- Underlies: Whitehorse Formation
- Overlies: Ishbel Group
- Thickness: Up to 557 metres (1,830 ft)

Lithology
- Primary: Siltstone, dolomite
- Other: Mudstone, shale, sandstone

Location
- Coordinates: 51°5′24″N 115°31′35″W
- Region: Alberta; British Columbia
- Country: Canada

Type section
- Named for: Sulphur Mountain, Alberta
- Named by: P.S. Warren
- Year defined: 1945

The Sulphur Mountain Formation is a geologic formation of Early to Middle Triassic age. It is present on the western edge of the Western Canada Sedimentary Basin in the foothills and Rocky Mountains of western Alberta and northeastern British Columbia. It includes marine fossils from the time shortly after the Permian-Triassic extinction event.

The Sulphur Mountain Formation was first described as a member of the Spray River Formation by P.S. Warren in 1945, who named it for Sulphur Mountain in Banff National Park. It was later raised to formation status. Its type section is located in the Spray River gorge at the southern end of Sulphur Mountain.

== Lithology and stratigraphy ==
The Sulphur Mountain Formation was deposited on the continental shelf along the western margin of the North American craton, which at that time was part of the supercontinent of Pangaea. It consists primarily of grey to rusty brown dolomitic and calcareous quartz siltstone, with interbeds of silty sandstone, silty dolomite, mudstone, shale, carbonaceous shale, and minor fine-grained quartz sandstone. Cross-bedding and ripple marks are common in its strata.

The Sulphur Mountain Formation is subdivided into the following members:

Geological Unit	Age	Lithology	Thickness	Reference
Llama Member	Middle Triassic	Yellowish grey-brown silty dolomite, silty shale, and minor very fine-grained quartz sandstone	3 – 64 m (9 – 201 ft)	
Whistler Member	Middle Triassic	Dark grey to black silty dolomite and dolomitic quartz siltstone	13 – 23 m (43 – 75 ft)	
Vega Siltstone Member	Early Triassic	Grey to rusty brown dolomitic and calcareous siltstone, silty limestone, and shale	52 – 363 m (170 – 1190 ft)	
Mackenzie Dolomite Lentil	Early Triassic	Light grey to yellowish grey, slightly calcareous, silty to sandy dolomite, with minor dolomitic quartz siltstone and sandstone	0 – 24 m (0 – 80 ft)	
Phroso Siltstone Member	Early Triassic	Grey-brown to dark grey quartz siltstone and silty shale	30 – 244 m (100 – 800 ft)	

== Paleontology ==
The Sulphur Mountain Formation has yielded fossils that provide a record of Triassic life shortly after the Permian-Triassic extinction event. Remains of extinct marine reptiles and fish have been found in its strata, as well as conodonts; shells of brachiopods and bivalves; teeth of Hybodus; shells of ammonoids; the ichnofossils Thalassinoides, Planolites, and Zoophycos; and traces of microbial mats.

Fish found at the formation include:

Taxon	Material	Notes
Rebellatrix divaricerca	A nearly complete and articulated specimen, missing the pectoral and pelvic fins and much of the skull	A fast swimming coelacanth
Listracanthus pectenatus		

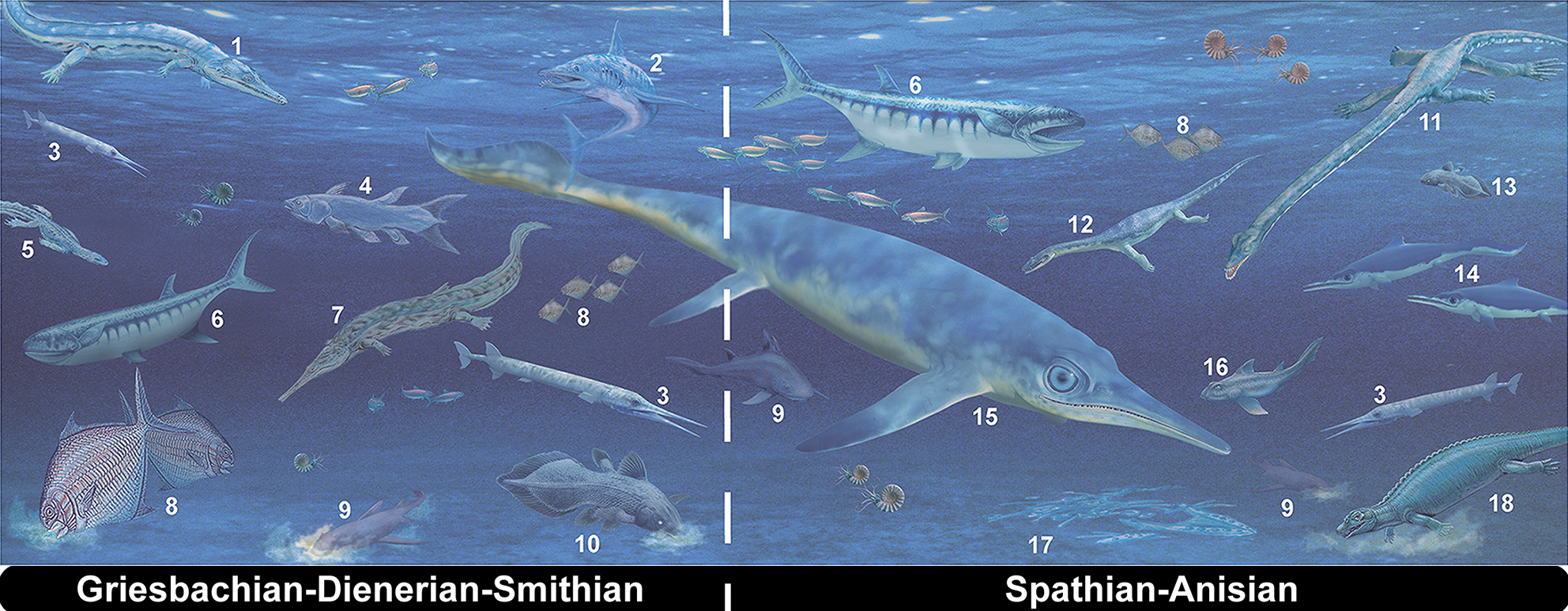
Early and Middle Triassic fish, marine reptiles, and ammonoids

Remains of the following marine reptiles have been found in the Sulphur Mountain Formation:

Taxon	Material	Notes
Agkistrognathus campbelli	A disarticulated skull	A thalattosaurian
Grippia longirostris	Several skulls and forelimbs	A basal ichthyosaur
Paralonectes merriami		A thalattosaurian
Thalattosaurus borealis	Anterior skull, partial mandible, vertebral centra, isolated ribs, left pterygoid	A thalattosaurian
Wapitisaurus problematicus		A thalattosaurian
Utatsusaurus sp.		

== Distribution and thickness ==
The Sulphur Mountain Formation is present in the foothills and eastern front ranges of the Canadian Rockies from the Canada–United States border in southwestern Alberta to the Pine River area of northeastern British Columbia. It ranges in thickness from a minimum of 37 metres (120 ft) south of the Bow River in Alberta to a maximum of 557 metres (1,830 ft) in northeastern British Columbia.

== Relationship to other units ==
The Sulphur Mountain Formation is laterally equivalent to Montney, Doig, and Halfway Formations in the subsurface beneath the plains of Alberta and northeastern British Columbia, and to the Toad, Grayling, and Liard Formations in the foothills of northeastern British Columbia. It unconformably overlies the Permian Ishbel Group or, in some areas, the Mississippian Rundle Group. It is conformably overlain by the Whitehorse Formation in the southern part of its extent and by the laterally equivalent Charlie Lake Formation in the north. In areas where those formations were removed by erosion it is unconformably overlain by the Jurassic Fernie Formation.

== Economic resources ==
=== Petroleum and natural gas ===
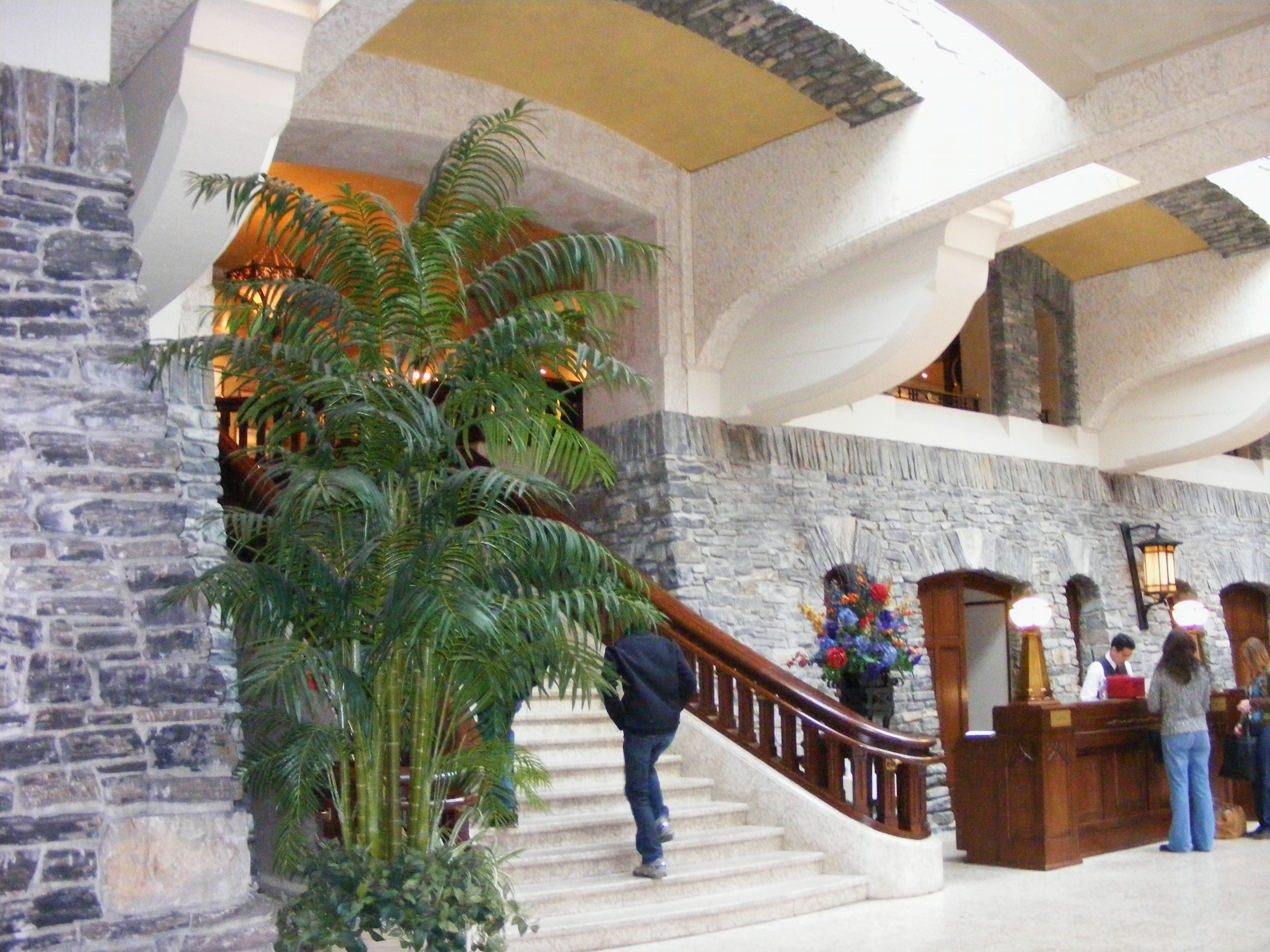
Dolomitic siltstone quarried from the Sulphur Mountain Formation is featured in the lobby of the Banff Springs Hotel.

Outcrops of the Sulphur Mountain Formation provide an analog for studying the Montney Formation, a laterally equivalent formation that is a major producer of shale oil and shale gas in the subsurface to the east.

=== Building stone ===
The flaggy siltstones of the Vega Member have been quarried as building stone in the Canmore area. This rock, which is commonly called "Rundle Rock" or "Rundle Stone", has been used extensively to face buildings and construct floors, patios, and fireplaces in the Jasper, Banff, and Calgary areas.

=== Phosphate ===
Although localized deposits of granular phosphate are present at the base of the Whistler Member, they lie within Jasper National Park and are protected from development.

== See also ==
- List of fossiliferous stratigraphic units in Alberta
