= Baldonnel =

Baldonnel may refer to:

- Baldonnel, County Dublin, Ireland, an industrial/agricultural area in County Dublin, Ireland
- Casement Aerodrome, also known as Baldonnel Aerodrome, an Irish military air base in County Dublin, Ireland
- Baldonnel, British Columbia, Canada, a town
- Baldonnel Formation, a geological formation in the area of the Canadian town
