= AAV =

AAV or Aav may refer to:

== Businesses ==
- Advantage Oil & Gas Ltd., a Canadian oil and gas company
- Armstrong Studios, an Australian recording studio later renamed AAV

== Language ==
- African American Vernacular English
- Austroasiatic languages, a language group of Southeast Asia

== People ==
- Aav (surname), Estonian surname
- Aníbal Acevedo Vilá, governor of Puerto Rico (2005-2008)

== Places ==
- Aire d'attraction d'une ville, a metropolitan statistical area used by the French national statistics office INSEE
- Allah Valley Airport in Soccsksargen Region, Philippines (IATA airport code AAV)

== Science and technology ==
- Adeno-associated virus, a nonpathogenic virus used as a gene therapy tool
- Air admittance valve, a valve in a drain-waste-vent system
- Anomalous Aerial Vehicle, a military term for an unidentified flying object
- Anti-aircraft vehicle, or self-propelled anti-aircraft weapon
- Assault Amphibious Vehicle or Amphibious Assault Vehicle, an amphibious tracked vehicle

== Other uses ==
- Another Angry Voice, a British political blog
- Vatican Apostolic Archive, Latin: Archivum Apostolicum Vaticanum
