= Liard Formation =

Stratigraphic unit in Canada

- Stratigraphic range: Middle Triassic to Late Triassic
- Type: Geological formation
- Underlies: Charlie Lake Formation; Garbutt Formation; Buckinghorse Formation
- Overlies: Toad Formation
- Thickness: up to about 420 metres (1370 ft)

Lithology
- Primary: Sandstone, siltstone
- Other: Limestone, dolomite

Location
- Coordinates: 59.276461°N 125.239326°W
- Region: British Columbia
- Country: Canada

Type section
- Named for: Liard River
- Named by: E.D. Kindle, 1946

The Liard Formation is a stratigraphic unit of Middle Triassic to Late Triassic age in the Western Canadian Sedimentary Basin that is present in northeastern British Columbia. It takes its name from the Liard River, and was first described from outcrops on the southern bank of that river, near Hell Gate Rapids in the Grand Canyon of the Liard, by E.D. Kindle in 1946.

The Liard Formation contains marine index fossils that define its age, but it is less fossiliferous than the underlying Toad Formation. A very diverse ichnofossil assemblage is also known from the upper part of the formation.

== Lithology ==
The Liard Formation is composed of dolomitic to calcareous sandstone and siltstone, with minor thin beds of dolomite and bioclastic limestone. The limestone becomes cherty south of the Peace River.

== Distribution ==
The Liard Formation extends from the Liard River to the Pine River in the foothills of the Northern Rockies in northeastern British Columbia. It reaches a maximum thickness of about 420 metres (1370 ft) in the Williston Lake area.

== Relationship to other units ==
The Liard Formation overlies the Toad Formation, and the contact is conformable in most areas. It is conformably overlain by the Charlie Lake Formation in the southern part of its extent. To the north in the Liard River area, it is unconformably overlain by the Garbutt Formation and Buckinghorse Formation. It is laterally equivalent to the Halfway Formation in the subsurface of the Peace River plains, and to the upper part of the Llama Member of the Sulphur Mountain Formation in the southern Canadian Rockies and their foothills.
