= Toad-Grayling Formation =

Geologic formation in Canada

- Stratigraphic range: Early to Middle Triassic
- Type: Geological formation
- Sub-units: Toad Formation; Grayling Formation
- Underlies: Liard Formation
- Overlies: Fantasque Formation

Lithology
- Primary: Siltstone, shale
- Other: Limestone, dolomite

Location
- Coordinates: 59°2′8″N 125°13′11″W
- Region: British Columbia
- Country: Canada

Type section
- Named for: Toad and Grayling Rivers
- Named by: E.D. Kindle, 1944

Toad Formation, Grayling Formation, and Toad-Grayling Formation are obsolete names for the strata of the Early to Middle Triassic Doig and Montney Formations. They were applied in the foothills and Rocky Mountains of northeastern British Columbia, on the western edge of the Western Canada Sedimentary Basin. Although the names are considered obsolete, their usage persists.

The Toad and Grayling strata have yielded fossils of marine organisms, including ammonites, brachiopods, and bivalves.

== Stratigraphic history ==
The Toad and Grayling Formations were originally described by E.D. Kindle in 1944, who named them for the Toad and Grayling Rivers, which are tributaries of the Liard River in northeasternmost British Columbia. They were combined as the Toad-Grayling Formation by A.D. Hunt and J.D. Ratcliffe in 1959. The Toad-Grayling was replaced by the Doig and Montney Formations by J.H. Armitage in 1962, and the names are now considered obsolete, although their usage persists.

== Lithology ==
The Grayling Formation consists of dolomitic siltstone and silty shale, with minor silty limestone, dolomite, and very fine-grained sandstone. It reaches a maximum thickness of about 460 metres (1500 ft). The overlying Toad Formation is more calcareous and less dolomitic than the Grayling. It consists of dark grey calcareous siltstone and silty limestone, with minor amounts of silty dolomite and calcareous sandstone and, in the lower part, minor thin, randomly dispersed lenses and nodules of phosphate. It reaches a maximum thickness of about 825 metres (2700 ft).

== Relationship to other units ==
The Grayling Formation unconformably overlies the Permian Fantasque Formation. It is equivalent to the lower Montney Formation in the subsurface of the Peace River plains and to the Phroso Siltstone Member of the Sulphur Mountain Formation in west-central and southwestern Alberta. Its contact with the overlying Toad Formation is gradational.

The Toad Formation is conformably overlain by the Liard Formation. North of the Peace River it is overlain, possibly unconformably, by the Ludington Formation, and in the Liard River area it is unconformably overlain by the Fort St. John Group. It is laterally equivalent to the Doig Formation and the upper two-thirds of the Montney Formation in the subsurface of the Peace River plains, and to part of the Llama Member of the Sulphur Mountain Formation in west-central and southwestern Alberta.

== See also ==
- List of fossiliferous stratigraphic units in British Columbia
