= Doig River, Alberta =

Community in Alberta

Doig River
- Unincorporated community
- Interactive map of Doig River
- Coordinates: 56°34′20″N 120°29′30″W
- Country: Canada
- Province: Alberta
- Municipal district: Clear Hills County
- Time zone: UTC−06:00 (Alberta Time)

Doig River is an unincorporated community in northern Alberta, Canada. It is located in Clear Hills County, in a landscape of muskeg and boreal forest.

The Doig Airport (IATA: N/A, ICAO: CFX3) is located nearby.

It was named after the Doig River, a tributary of Beatton River. The middle Triassic bituminous Doig Formation was named after this place.
