= Alfred Garrioch =

Anglican priest and author (1848–1934)

- Born: February 14, 1848; Portage la Prairie, Rupert's Land
- Died: December 2, 1934 (aged 86); Winnipeg, Manitoba
- Occupation: Anglican priest
- Known for: Author

Alfred Campbell Garrioch (February 14, 1848 – December 2, 1934) was an Anglican priest and author who lived in Manitoba, Canada.

He was born in Portage la Prairie, Manitoba, in 1848. In 1866, he married Agnes Bertha Crabbe, and together they raised 12 children. He studied theology at St. John's College in 1869.

He was ordained as an Anglican priest serving in Peace River in Manitoba. In 1885, while working in England he translated several books into the Beaver language as well as creating an English-Beaver and Cree dictionary. He also wrote some autobiographical works, including First Furrows in 1923 and The Correction Line in 1933. He died in Winnipeg in 1934.

== Works ==
- First Furrows, (1923)
- The Far And Furry North, (1925)
- A Hatchet Mark In Duplicate, (1929)
- The Correction Line, (1933)
