= Whitehorse Formation (Canada) =

Geologic formation of Canada

- Stratigraphic range: Late Triassic
- Type: Geological formation
- Unit of: Spray River Group
- Sub-units: Winnifred Member; Brewster Limestone; Olympus Sandstone Lentil; Starlight Evaporite Member
- Underlies: Fernie Formation
- Overlies: Sulphur Mountain Formation
- Thickness: Up to 500 metres (1,640 ft)

Lithology
- Primary: Limestone, dolomite
- Other: Sandstone, gypsum

Location
- Coordinates: 52°59′5″N 117°20′48″W
- Region: Alberta, British Columbia
- Country: Canada

Type section
- Named for: Whitehorse Creek
- Named by: P.S. Warren
- Year defined: 1945

The Whitehorse Formation is a geologic formation of Late Triassic age. It is present on the western edge of the Western Canada Sedimentary Basin in western Alberta and northeastern British Columbia. It was first described as a member of the Spray River Formation by P.S. Warren in 1945, who named it for Whitehorse Creek, a tributary of the McLeod River south of Cadomin, Alberta. It was later raised to formation status.

Marine fossils from the Late Triassic epoch including crinoids, brachiopods, bivalves, and gastropods, have been found in the Whitehorse Formation.

== Lithology and stratigraphy ==
The Whitehorse Formation was deposited on the continental shelf along the western margin of the North American craton. It consists of dolomite, limestone, quartzose sandstone, and siltstone, with minor gypsum.

The Whitehorse Formation is subdivided into the following members:

Geological Unit	Age	Lithology	Thickness	Reference
Winnifred Member	Late Triassic	Grey silty to sandy quartzose dolomite, with minor beds of quartz siltstone	4 – 44 m (12 – 145 ft)	
Brewster Limestone Member	Late Triassic	Grey, cliff-forming fossiliferous limestone with local interbeds of silty to sandy dolomite	0 – 63 m (0 – 207 ft)	
Starlight Evaporite Member	Late Triassic	Interbedded dolomite, limestone, sandstone, siltstone, and minor gypsum	6 – 402 m (20 – 1320 ft)	
Olympus Sandstone Lentil	Late Triassic	Cliff-forming, slightly dolomitic quartz sandstone and, locally, sandy dolomite	0 – 140 m (0 – 457 ft)	

== Distribution and relationship to other units ==
The Whitehorse Formation is present in the Rocky Mountains and their foothills from the Canada–United States border in Alberta to the Sukunka River area of northeastern British Columbia. It is disconformably overlain by the Jurassic Fernie Formation and conformably underlain by the Sulphur Mountain Formation. It is correlative with the Charlie Lake, Ludington, Baldonnel and lower Pardonet Formations and, in the subsurface of northeastern British Columbia, the Schooler Creek Group.

== Economic resources ==
=== Gypsum ===
Although localized deposits of gypsum are present in the Starlight Evaporite Member, they lie within Jasper National Park and are protected from development.
