= Blueberry River First Nations =

Band of Indigenous peoples in British Columbia, Canada

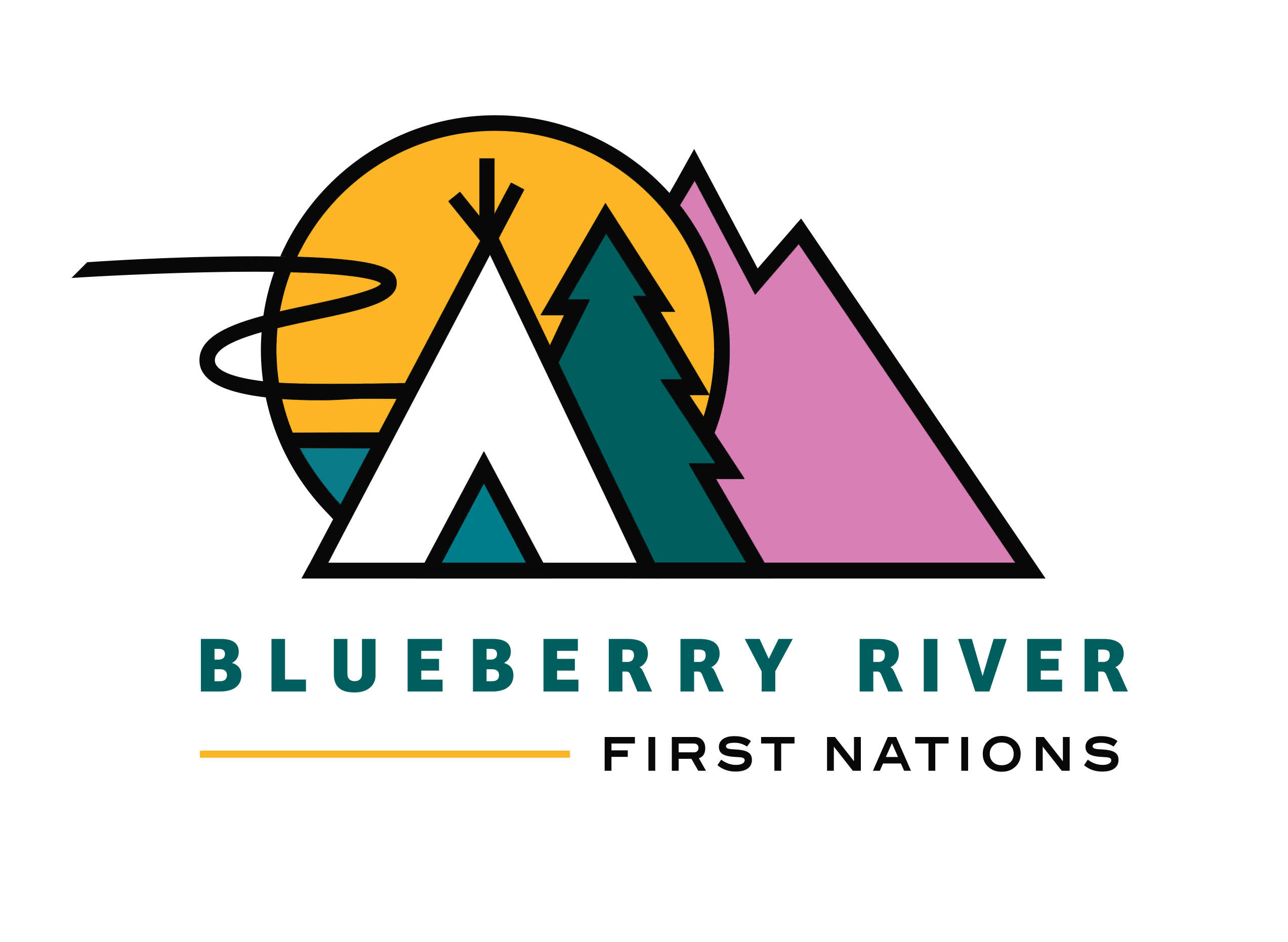
- Logo of the Blueberry River First Nations
- People: Dane-zaa
- Treaty: Treaty 8
- Headquarters: Buick Creek
- Province: British Columbia

Land
- Main reserve: Blueberry River 205
- Reserves: Beaton River 204; Charlie Lake
- Land area: 15.05 km^{2} (5.81 sq mi)

Population (2025)
- On reserve: 201
- On other land: 46
- Off reserve: 310
- Total population: 547

Government
- Chief: Judy Desjarlais
- Council: Cherry Dominic; Shelley Gauthier; Troy Wolf; Wayne Yahey; Linda Chipesia

Website
- blueberryfn.com

Blueberry River First Nations is an Indian band based in the Peace country in northeast British Columbia. The band is headquartered on Blueberry River 205 Indian reserve located 80 kilometres (50 mi) northwest of Fort St. John, siting on oil and gas reserves. The band is party to Treaty 8.

== History ==
Blueberry River First Nations has Dane-zaa and Cree roots. They first joined Treaty 8 in 1990 after the initial signing of the adherence document a year prior at Lesser Slave Lake.

The earliest record of the Dane-zaa people came from oral stories recorded by fur traders in 1793. At the time, the band occupied land in the Rocky Mountains in Northwestern Alberta, Canada.

In April 2020, the nation went into lockdown after COVID-19 struck.

== Leadership ==
Blueberry's band is led by a council of five and one appointed chief.

In May 2021, the Federal Court of Canada ordered the nation's governing council to meet to discuss a petition to have Chief Marvin Yahey removed from his position. The petition had been started by three councilors, alleging a breach of the Chief's fiduciary duties and noting that the council had not met in over a year. The council found Yahey guilty, and he was removed as Chief after eight years of leadership.

Chief Judy Desjarlais, Yahey's successor, was removed from her position as chief on September 17, 2024, after the council found her guilty of giving gas and oil companies permit approvals to work on the traditional lands without consulting the other council members.

== Environment ==
The band's territory extends over 38 300 square kilometers, including the Montney Basin. The nation's territory has been marked as an epicenter of oil and gas activity, with extensive industrial presence. Across 73% of the nation's territory, there is at least one road, hydro reservoir, pipeline, or gas well within a 250-meter radius. The construction of the W. A. C. Bennett Dam in the 1960s flooded parts of the nation's territory. This is not the only time that outside influence on the environment affected the band. Due to extraction of oil and gas, there was also a large toxic gas leak in 1979 causing the band to have to temporarily relocate to Riddington for safety concerns.

== Demographics ==
The 2016 Statistics Canada census noted a population increase of 3% from 2006, with a median age of 27. Total population is 197.

The population of the band has increased significantly since 2016, now having a total population of 547 reported in October 2025.

== Court cases ==
In recent years, many pieces of legislation have been brought to try and combat the development that has been increasing on Blueberry's land. This is an issue that spans nearly eighty years, starting with the building of The Alaska Highway in 1940 which intersects with the bands claim area.

In Yahey v. British Columbia, 2015 (BCSC 1302), the British Columbia Supreme Court dismissed the band's application for a pre-trial injunction to prevent the province from proceeding with a planned auction of 15 timber sale licenses. The court dismissed the application on the basis that it was not satisfied the timber sales would materially increase the cumulative impacts on Treaty rights.

The second application on the same subject was heard in late October 2016. This time the band sought an injunction to prohibit the Province from authorizing industrial development relating to forestry and oil and gas activities within defined "critical areas". The court rejected the application for an injunction on the basis that the issue would go to trial in March 2018 and no "irreparable harm" would occur in the meantime.

In June 2021, the British Columbia Supreme Court, in Yahey v. British Columbia, 2021 (BCSC 1287), ruled that the provincial government had breached its Treaty 8 obligations by permitting forestry, energy, and mining development within the Blueberry River First Nation's claim area. Justice Emily Burke ruled that the province had failed to assess that the cumulative effect of approving developments and taking land meant that the nation could not meaningfully exercise its treaty rights. The court declared that the province must halt authorizations that would lead to further breaches, suspended for six months so the parties could negotiate a regulatory scheme. This court case, from 2015 to 2021, was the first time that a First Nation Band sued a provincial Government for Treaty 8 infringements in the history of Canada's legal system.

== Impact of the modern economy in 2019 ==
During an initial trial which began in May 2019, the province of British Columbia suggested that the First Nation needed to “modernize” its livelihood, with its representative stating that “Reserve lands may provide for the ‘livelihood’ of First Nations in modern times through agriculture, ranching or the exploitation of the subsurface rights.”

The impact of the "modern economy" presented during opening remarks by the representative of Blueberry stated that "projects approved between 2013-2016" included:

- " 2,600 oil and gas wells
- 1,884 kilometres of petroleum access and permanent roads
- 740 kilometres of petroleum development roads
- 1,500 kilometres of new pipelines
- 9,400 kilometres of seismic lines, and
- harvesting of approximately 290 forestry cutblocks."

Arguments presented in the case have raised broader questions about assimilation of an indigenous people, and the choice to continue to pursue a traditional way of life.

One commentator expressed concerns regarding the definition of modernity, wondering whether "ever-expanding exploitative resource extraction activities continue to define our moment in time as a society .. even when science tells us that cumulative impacts are imperiling wildlife survival."
