= Doig Formation =

Geological formation

- Stratigraphic range: middle Anisian-Ladinian; ~245–237 Ma
- Type: Geological formation
- Underlies: Halfway Formation
- Overlies: Montney Formation
- Thickness: up to 190 metres (620 ft)

Lithology
- Primary: Siltstone, shale
- Other: Phosphate, sandstone

Location
- Coordinates: 55.7°N 121.3°W
- Approximate paleocoordinates: 25.1°N 35.0°E
- Region: NW Alberta; NE British Columbia; SE Yukon
- Country: Canada
- Extent: Western Canadian Sedimentary Basin

Type section
- Named for: Doig River
- Named by: J.H. Armitage
- Year defined: 1962
- Doig Formation (Canada) Doig Formation (British Columbia)

The Doig Formation is a geologic formation of middle Triassic age in the Western Canadian Sedimentary Basin. It takes the name from Doig River, a tributary of the Beatton River, and was first described in the Texaco N.F.A. Buick Creek No. 7 well (located north-west of Fort St. John, east of the Alaska Highway) by J.H. Armitage in 1962. .

== Lithology ==
The Doig Formation is composed of fine grained, grey argillaceous siltstone and dark calcareous shale. Phosphate nodules occur at the base of the formation. Anomalously thicker, porous sandstone channels and bars are present locally in the upper units of the formation. The formation has provided fossils of various species of conodonts; Magnigondolella alexanderi, M. cyri, M. julii, M. nebuchadnezzari, M. salomae, Neogondolella curva, N. hastata, N. panlaurentia and N. ex gr. shoshonensis.

== Distribution ==
The Doig Formation reaches a maximum thickness of 190 metres (620 ft) in the Canadian Rockies foothills it thins towards the north and east. It occurs in the subsurface in north-western Alberta, north-eastern British Columbia and southern Yukon, from 53°N and 118°W to the Canadian Rockies.

== Relationship to other units ==
The Doig Formation is unconformably overlain by the Halfway Formation of the Schooler Creek Group; the contact is marked by a dolomitic bed and a chert and quartz conglomerate bed. To the west it is overlain by younger Jurassic beds. It conformably overlies the Montney Formation and the contact is marked by a phosphate pellet bed in the base of the Doig.

The formation correlates with the lower Llama Member of the Sulphur Mountain Formation in the southern ranges of the Canadian Rockies, with the Whistler Member of the Whitehorse Formation in the Muskwa Ranges, and with the Toad Formation in the upper Liard River area.

== Petroleum geology ==
The Doig formation is an important source rock for the Triassic Halfway and Charlie Lake formations. Total organic carbon values in the "phosphate zone" at the base of the Doig are commonly greater than 4% by weight and can reach up to 11%. The "phosphate zone" is also a potential undeveloped shale gas reservoir with as much as 400 trillion cubic feet of natural gas in place. Oil and gas is also extracted from the Doig Formation in conventional reservoirs along the western Montney trend and in the Peace River Arch.
