= Spray River Group =

Stratigraphic unit of Canada

- Stratigraphic range: Triassic
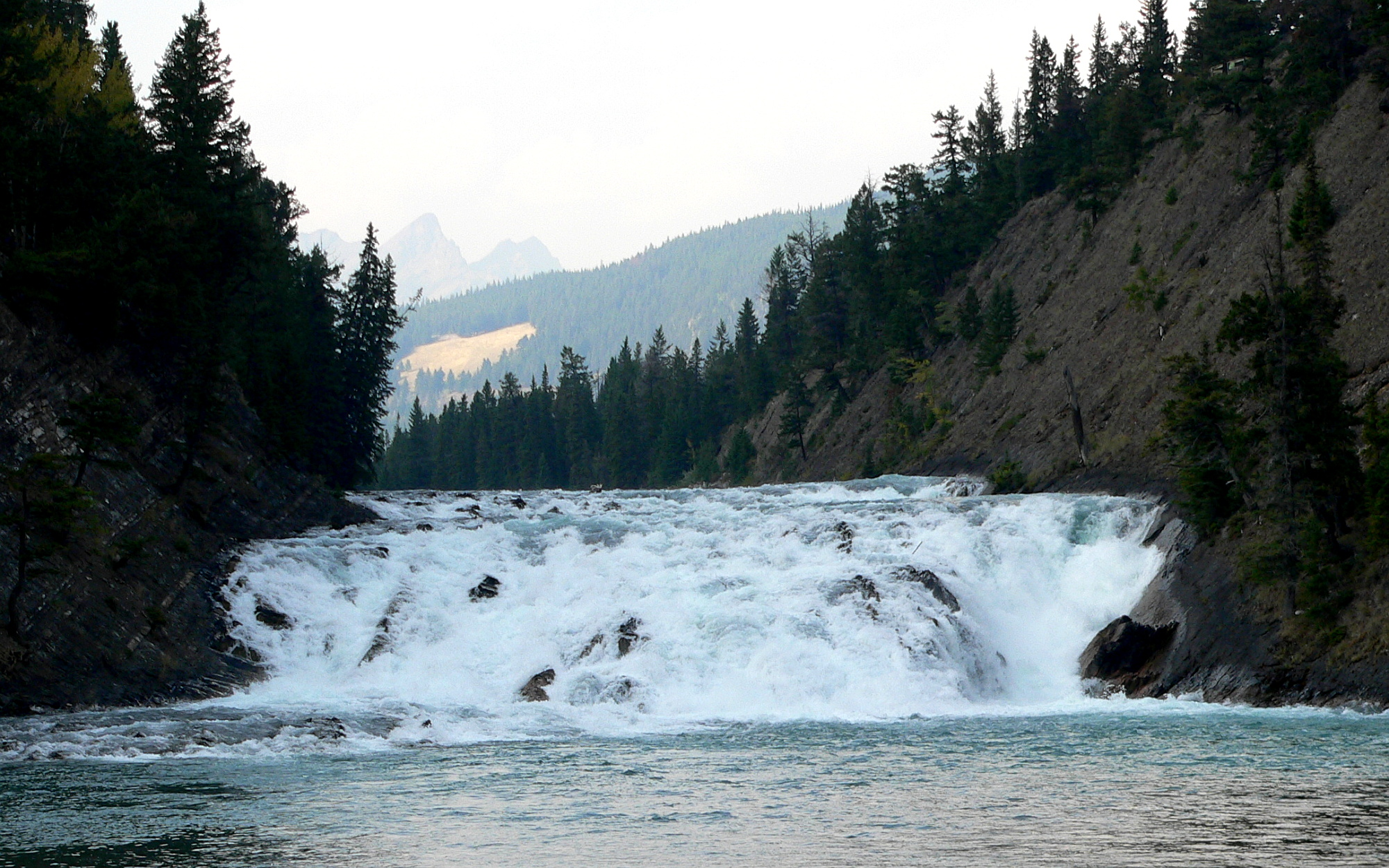
- Spray River strata exposed at Bow Falls
- Type: Group
- Sub-units: Whitehorse Formation; Sulphur Mountain Formation
- Underlies: Fernie Formation
- Overlies: Ishbel Group
- Thickness: Up to about 850 m (2,790 ft)

Lithology
- Primary: Siltstone, dolomite
- Other: Limestone, sandstone

Location
- Coordinates: 51°5′24″N 115°31′35″W
- Region: Alberta
- Country: Canada

Type section
- Named for: Spray River
- Named by: E.M. Kindle

The Spray River Group is a stratigraphic unit of Triassic age. It is present on the western edge of the Western Canada Sedimentary Basin in the foothills and Rocky Mountains of western Alberta. It was originally described as the Spray River Formation by E.M. Kindle in 1924 and was later raised to group status. Its type section is located in the Spray River gorge at the southern end of Sulphur Mountain.

The Spray River Group includes marine fossils from the Triassic period.

== Stratigraphy and lithology ==
The Spray River Group was deposited on the continental shelf along the western margin of the North American craton. It is subdivided into two formations: the Sulphur Mountain Formation at the base and the Whitehorse Formation at the top.

The Sulphur Mountain Formation consists of dolomitic and calcitic siltstones, silty dolomites, dolomitic limestones, and very fine-grained dolomitic quartz sandstones. The Whitehorse Formation consists of dolomites, dolomitic siltstones and limestones, and dolomitic and calcitic quartzites.

== See also ==
- List of fossiliferous stratigraphic units in Alberta
