= Aav (surname) =

Estonian family name

Aav is an Estonian surname. Notable people with the surname include:

- Evald Aav (1900–1939), Estonian composer
- Herman Aav (1878–1961), Estonian Orthodox archbishop
- Tõnu Aav (1939–2019), Estonian stage, TV, film, and radio actor
