= Blueberry River (British Columbia) =

River in the country of Canada

Coordinates: 56°44′00″N 120°49′00″W

The Blueberry River is a river in the Peace River Block of northeastern British Columbia, Canada. It is a tributary of the Beatton River, which is a tributary of the Peace River.

This river should not be confused with the Blaeberry River near Golden, which is sometimes incorrectly known as the Blueberry River.

== See also ==
- List of rivers of British Columbia
