= Advantage Energy =

Canadian oil and gas company

Advantage Energy Ltd.
- Company type: Public
- Traded as: TSX: AAV
- Industry: Oil and natural gas
- Founded: 2001; 25 years ago, in Calgary, Alberta
- Headquarters: Calgary, Alberta
- Key people: Andy J. Mah (CEO); Mike Belenkie (president & COO); Craig Blackwood (CFO)
- Products: Oil and natural gas
- Revenue: 251 million CAD (2019)
- Website: www.advantageog.com

Advantage Energy Ltd. is a Canadian oil and gas company based in Calgary, Alberta. The company is focused on the development of its Montney fossil gas and liquids resource play to provide Canadian energy. In 2019, it produced 45,833 barrels of oil equivalent per day, with 94% of production consisting of natural gas and 6% light oil and liquids with a low emission intensity of 4 kg CO2e/boe. It is listed on the Toronto Stock Exchange under the symbol TSX: AAV.

== Operations ==
Advantage's Montney assets are located from approximately 4 km to 80 km northwest of the city of Grande Prairie, Alberta. Land holdings consist of 210 net sections (134,400 net acres) of liquids rich Montney lands at Glacier, Vahalla, Progress, and Pipestone/Wembley.

Since 2008, production has grown to approximately 275 mmcfe/d (45,833 boe/d) and 2P reserves had increased to 2.8 Tcfe (466 million Boe) at December 31, 2019.

Management estimates a future drilling inventory of >1,400 horizontal well locations. Total estimated capital expenditures over the life of the project could exceed $10 billion with associated reserves and production growth. Future investment will target the highest return and short payout investments in natural gas or liquids to fill the company's existing owned surplus capacity through balancing free cash generation, debt reduction and modest growth.
