= Beatton River =

Tributary river in British Columbia, Canada

Coordinates: 56°06′00″N 120°23′00″W

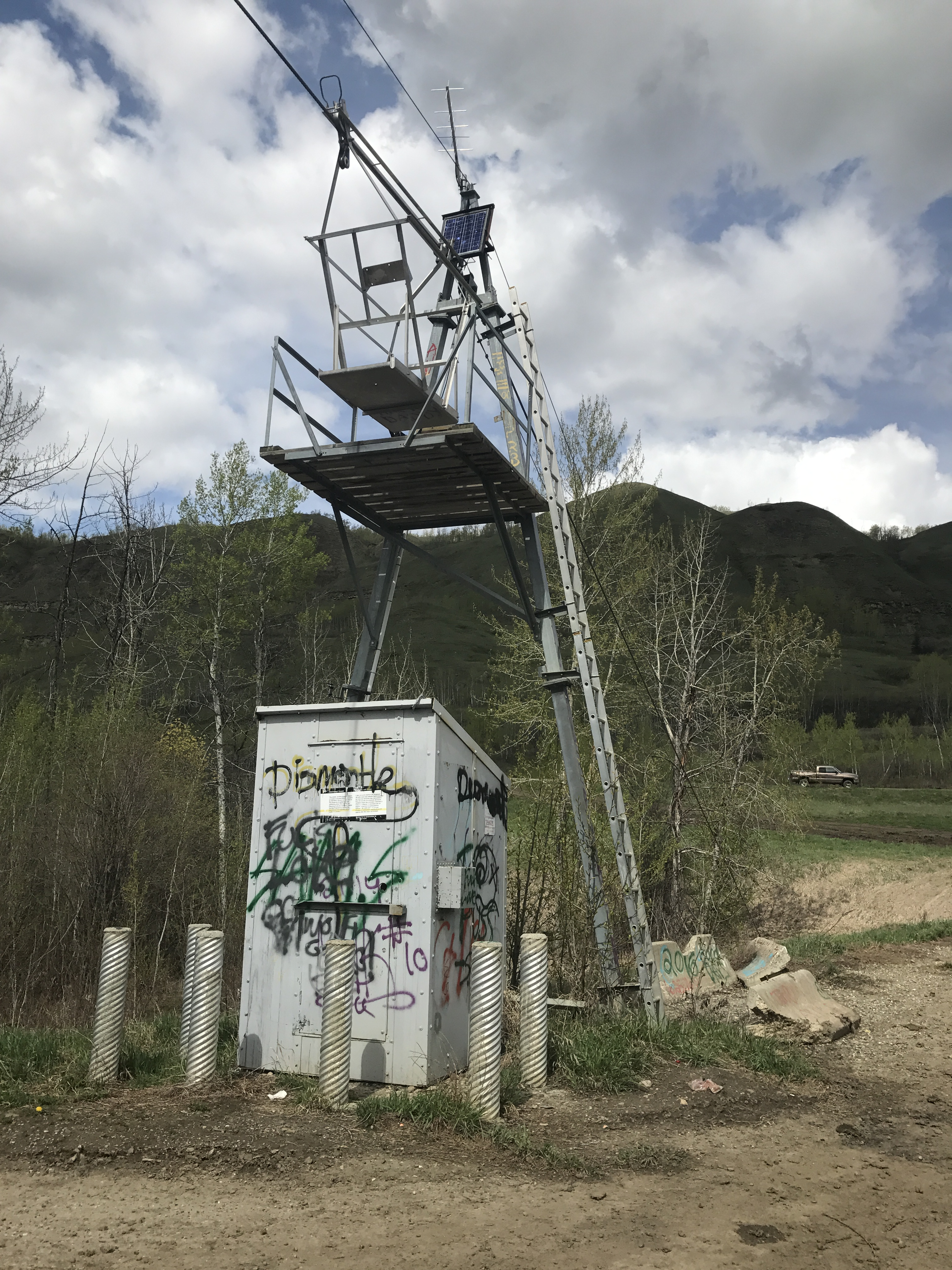
Cable car at site of Beatton river bridge

The Beatton River is a tributary of the Peace River, flowing generally east, then south through north-eastern British Columbia, Canada. The river rises at Pink Mountain, about 10 kilometres (6 mi) west of the Alaska Highway hamlet of the same name, and flows 240 kilometres (150 mi) generally east, then south, draining into the Peace River just downstream of Fort St. John. The river meanders mostly through the boreal forest and muskeg of the Peace Plain. Its major tributaries are the Doig and Blueberry Rivers.

The area around the river is the homeland of the Dane-zaa or Beaver First Nation. Archaeologists have found evidence of human habitation in the area dating back at least 10,000 years. The mouth of the Beatton River was the location of a Northwest Company fort established in 1806. Modern-day British Columbia's first European settlement was fur trading Rocky Mountain Fort, established in 1794 at the mouth of the Moberly River near the present Fort St. John. The river became an important route for First Nations people in their trading relationship with the Europeans. The present community of Fort St. John is west of the Beatton.

The river, originally called the "North Pine" is named for Frank Beaton (1863–1944), the manager of the Hudson's Bay Company post in the early twentieth century, who homesteaded by the river. Beaton spelled his name with one "t" but the river is now spelled Beatton.

The banks of the Beatton River are home to the northernmost naturally occurring cactus population in the world, with outcroppings of Opuntia fragilis being present up to 30 km (18 mi) upstream from its confluence with the Peace River, just southwest of Cecil Lake and northeast of Fort St. John. One such outcropping is accessible through the Cactus Loop Trail along Cecil Lake Road.

== See also ==
- List of rivers of British Columbia
