= Baldonnel Formation =

Geologic formation in Western Canada

- Stratigraphic range: Carnian
- Type: Geological formation
- Unit of: Schooler Creek Group
- Sub-units: Ducette Member
- Underlies: Pardonet Formation, Fernie Formation
- Overlies: Charlie Lake Formation
- Thickness: up to 146 metres (480 ft)

Lithology
- Primary: Limestone, dolomite
- Other: Siltstone, sandstone

Location
- Coordinates: 56.11404°N 122.81095°W
- Region: Alberta, British Columbia
- Country: Canada

Type section
- Named for: Baldonnel, British Columbia
- Named by: L.M. Clark, 1957

The Baldonnel Formation is a stratigraphic unit of Carnian age in the Western Canadian Sedimentary Basin.

It takes the name from the hamlet of Baldonnel, British Columbia, and was first described in the Pacific Fort St. John No. 16 well by L.M. Clark in 1957. A surface type locality can be found at Brown Hill, on the north shore of Williston Lake, at 56.11404°N 122.81095°W.

== Lithology ==
The upper unit of the Baldonnel Formation consists of grey massive limestone and dolomite in the Canadian Rockies foothills and in the western range between the Liard River and Peace River. Siltstone and fine grained sandstone occur as interbeds.

In the sub-surface of the Peace River Country, the Baldonnel Formation is represented by porous and permeable dolomite.

=== Oil and gas production ===
Gas is produced from the Baldonnel Formation in north-eastern British Columbia.

== Distribution ==
The Baldonnel Formation occurs in outcrops in the Williston Lake area of the Canadian Rockies, and in the sub-surface from the Liard River to the Peace River Country.

It reaches a maximum thickness of 146 metres (480 ft) south of Hudson's Hope.

== Relationship to other units ==
The Baldonnel Formation is the middle member of the Schooler Creek Group. It is conformably overlain by the Pardonet Formation limestone and siltstone or unconformably overlain by the Fernie Formation shale. North of the Williston Lake it overlies the dolomite beds of the Charlie Lake Formation.

It is equivalent to the upper parts of the McLearn Formation and Ludington Formation. It can also be correlated with the Winnifred Member of the Whitehorse Formation in central Alberta.

=== Ducette Member ===
The lower unit is designated as Ducette Member. It occurs only in the south-west of the range, between the Liard River and the Peace River.

It is composed of argillaceous siltstone, very fine grained sandstone and limestone.
