= Baldonnel, British Columbia =

Baldonnel
- Location within British Columbia Location within Canada Location within North America
- Coordinates: 56.1302°N 120.4121°W

Baldonnel (population ~142) is a town in the Peace River District of British Columbia, Canada, near Fort St. John. It is at an elevation of 680 meters (2,230 ft). The community contains a K-6 school and used to contain a post office.

== Name ==
The community gives the name to the gas bearing Baldonnel Formation.

== Climate ==
Climate data for Baldonnel
Month	Jan	Feb	Mar	Apr	May	Jun	Jul	Aug	Sep	Oct	Nov	Dec	Year
Record high °C (°F)	13.3 (55.9)	14.4 (57.9)	18.9 (66.0)	29.4 (84.9)	31.7 (89.1)	32.2 (90.0)	40.6 (105.1)	34.5 (94.1)	32.8 (91.0)	27.2 (81.0)	18.3 (64.9)	12.2 (54.0)	40.6 (105.1)
Mean daily maximum °C (°F)	−7.3 (18.9)	−5.3 (22.5)	1.3 (34.3)	9.8 (49.6)	16.3 (61.3)	19.7 (67.5)	21.9 (71.4)	20.8 (69.4)	14.8 (58.6)	7.8 (46.0)	−4.6 (23.7)	−8.2 (17.2)	7.2 (45.0)
Daily mean °C (°F)	−11.4 (11.5)	−9.9 (14.2)	−3.7 (25.3)	4.2 (39.6)	10.2 (50.4)	13.9 (57.0)	15.9 (60.6)	14.8 (58.6)	9.5 (49.1)	3.5 (38.3)	−8.4 (16.9)	−12.1 (10.2)	2.2 (36.0)
Mean daily minimum °C (°F)	−15.5 (4.1)	−14.4 (6.1)	−8.6 (16.5)	−1.4 (29.5)	4.0 (39.2)	8.0 (46.4)	9.8 (49.6)	8.8 (47.8)	4.3 (39.7)	−0.8 (30.6)	−12.1 (10.2)	−15.7 (3.7)	−2.8 (27.0)
Record low °C (°F)	−48.9 (−56.0)	−42.8 (−45.0)	−37.2 (−35.0)	−32.2 (−26.0)	−10.6 (12.9)	−2.8 (27.0)	1.1 (34.0)	−2.8 (27.0)	−13.9 (7.0)	−26.5 (−15.7)	−40.0 (−40.0)	−47.8 (−54.0)	−48.9 (−56.0)
Average precipitation mm (inches)	25.9 (1.02)	18.5 (0.73)	17.7 (0.70)	22.4 (0.88)	39.7 (1.56)	70.0 (2.76)	75.3 (2.96)	51.3 (2.02)	43.8 (1.72)	32.0 (1.26)	28.1 (1.11)	25.2 (0.99)	449.7 (17.70)
Average rainfall mm (inches)	0.3 (0.01)	0.3 (0.01)	0.3 (0.01)	14.2 (0.56)	36.4 (1.43)	70.0 (2.76)	75.3 (2.96)	51.3 (2.02)	42.7 (1.68)	19.1 (0.75)	2.6 (0.10)	1.4 (0.06)	313.9 (12.36)
Average snowfall cm (inches)	25.5 (10.0)	18.2 (7.2)	17.4 (6.9)	8.2 (3.2)	3.3 (1.3)	0.0 (0.0)	0.0 (0.0)	0.0 (0.0)	1.0 (0.4)	12.9 (5.1)	25.5 (10.0)	23.8 (9.4)	135.8 (53.5)
Average precipitation days (≥ 0.2 mm)	9.8	9.5	7.5	8.0	10.7	12.1	13.0	12.2	11.3	10.5	11.8	10.0	126.4
Average rainy days (≥ 0.2 mm)	0.4	0.5	0.4	5.8	10.7	12.1	13.0	12.2	11.2	6.9	1.7	0.5	75.2
Average snowy days (≥ 0.2 cm)	9.5	9.0	7.3	3.8	0.6	0.0	0.0	0.0	0.6	4.9	10.5	9.6	55.7
