= Montney, British Columbia =

Montney
- Location of Montney in British Columbia
- Coordinates: 56°27′00″N 120°55′00″W
- Country: Canada
- Province: British Columbia
- Area codes: 250, 778

Montney is an unincorporated locality located in British Columbia about 15 miles (24 km) north of Fort St. John, near Beatton Provincial Park.

It lies at an elevation of 700 meters (2,300 ft), along the BC Rail tracks.

The settlement gives the name to the Montney Formation, a gas-bearing geological unit first described in a well located north-west of the hamlet.

The name of the town is an Anglicized form of an Indigenous name. The fact that the name is spelled the same as the Montney family name is purely coincidental.
