= Dane-zaa =

First Nations in Alberta and British Columbia, Canada

ᑕᓀᖚ
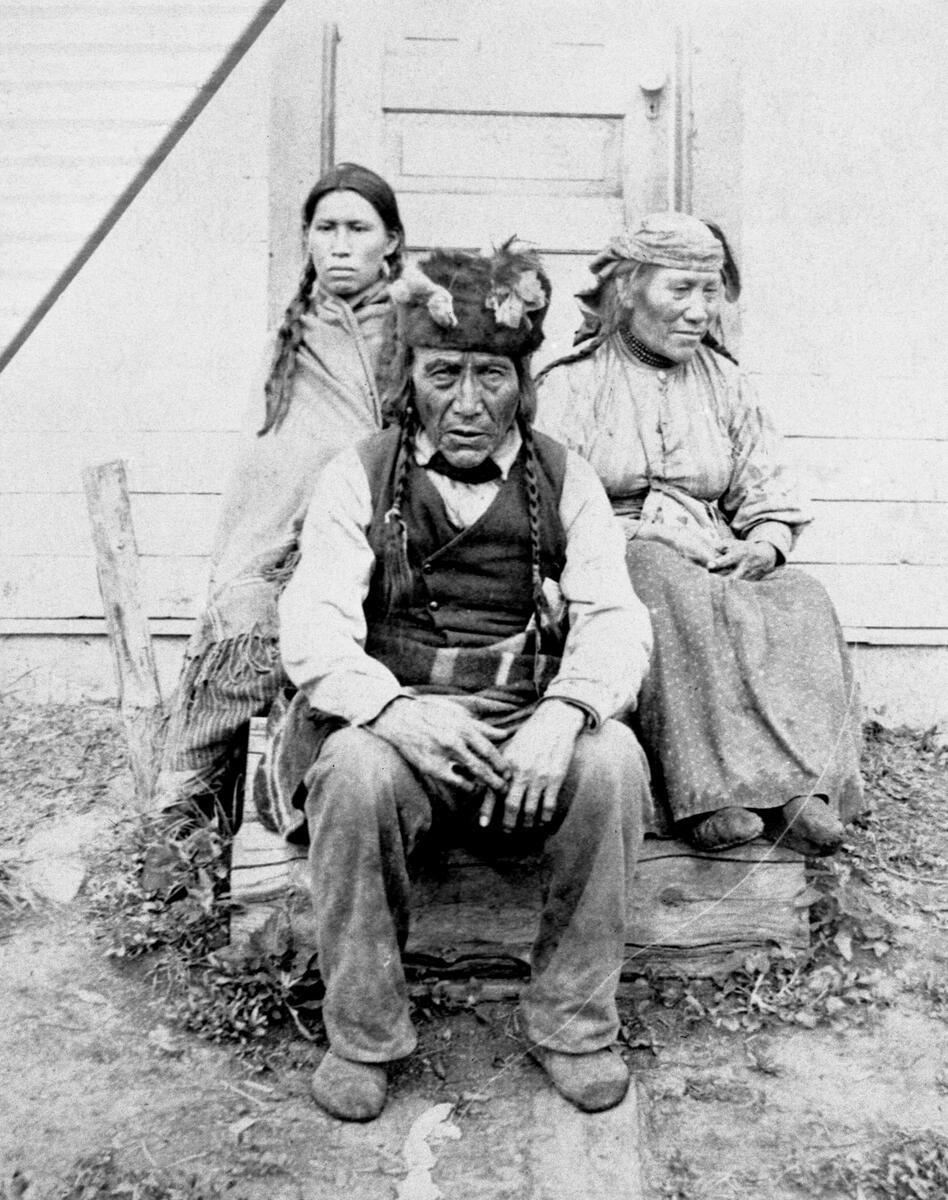
- Dane-zaa chief and family, Peace River area Alberta, 1899, Glenbow Museum

Total population
- 1,700 (2016 census)

Regions with significant populations
- Canada
- British Columbia: 890 (2016)
- Alberta: 770 (2016)

Languages
- English, Dane-zaa

Religion
- Christianity, Indigenous religion

Related ethnic groups
- Tsuu Tʼina

- People: Dane-ẕaa ᑕᓀᖚ
- Language: Dane-ẕaa Ẕáágéʔ ᑕᓀᖚ ᖚᗀᐥ
- Country: Dane-ẕaa nanéʔ ᑕᓀᖚ ᓇᓀᐥ, Denendeh ᑌᓀᐣᑌᐧ

The Dane-zaa (ᑕᓀᖚ, also spelled Dunne-za, or Tsattine) are an Athabaskan-speaking group of First Nations people. Their traditional territory is around the Peace River in Alberta and British Columbia, Canada. Today, about 1,600 Dane-zaa reside in British Columbia and 270 of them speak the Dane-zaa language. Approximately 770 Dane-zaa live in Alberta.

Europeans historically referred to the Dane-zaa as the Beaver.

== Name ==
The name Dunne-za has been translated to "Those who live among the beaver." The spelling Dane-zaa is typically used for "the Real People." That spelling is used by the Dane-zaa Language Authority. Different tribes and First Nations use different spellings. For example, the Doig River First Nation (DRFN) and Halfway River First Nation (HRFN) use Dane-Zaa. Prophet River First Nation (PRFN) uses Dene Tsaa; and the West Moberly First Nations (WMFNs) use Dunne-za or Dunne Za. Where other spellings are used in citations, such as Dunne-Za (e.g., Ridington 1988), they are kept intact and are synonymous with Dane-zaa.

The historic usual English term Beaver is a translation of the name used by several of their neighboring tribes. The Dakelh called them Tsattine / Tsatʼen and the Plains Cree called them Amiskiwiyiniw, both meaning "Those who live among the beaver" or "Beaver People." In French, they are known as the Gens de Castor, meaning "People of the Beaver".

== History ==
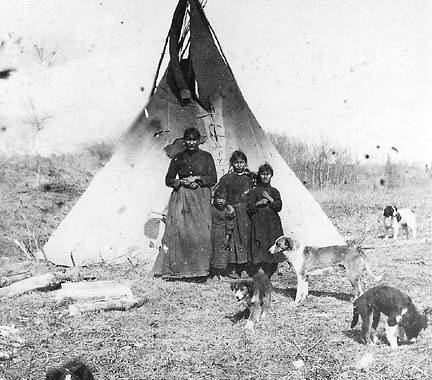
Dane-zaa (Beaver) women and children in front of their tipi, 1899

Prior to the 19th century, the Dane-zaa inhabited lands further east, near the Athabaska and Clearwater Rivers, and north to Lake Athabaska, as well as territory north of the upper Peace River (called Saaghii Naachii, meaning "big river," by them). Archaeological evidence at Charlie Lake Cave establishes that the area of Charlie Lake north of Fort St John has been continuously occupied for 10,500 years by varying cultures of indigenous peoples.

In the late 18th century, European-Canadians opened the Peace River area to fur trading. Scot-Canadian explorer Alexander Mackenzie (explorer) established Rocky Mountain Fort at the mouth of the Moberly River in 1794.

According to Dane-zaa oral history, the Peace River is named for the settling of a conflict between the Dane-zaa and the Cree. The Cree traditionally lived south and east of the Upper Peace River region. Due to their trade with settlers, they had guns and they pushed the Dane-zaa northwest in the late 18th century. A peace treaty, negotiated in the late 1700s or early 1800s, stated that the Cree would live south of the Peace River, and the Dane-zaa north. The Peace River, before and after its new name, marked a boundary zone, where groups met for trade, celebration, and settling of disputes.

A post journal of 1799–1800 mentions people trading at the post who can be identified as the ancestors of members of the former Fort St John Band, now the Doig River and Blueberry River First Nations. Doig oral history confirms that the ancestors of present Dane-zaa families were in the upper Peace River area prior to the first contact by Alexander Mackenzie in 1793. Traders provisioned their expeditions with bison meat and grease provided by the Dane-zaa in their hunting on the rich prairies of the upper Peace River area. By the time the Hudson's Bay Company took over the North West Company in 1823, bison were scarce.

Traditionally, Dane-zaa has followed the teachings and songs of Dreamers, who first predicted the coming of the Europeans. The last Dreamer, Charlie Yahey, died in 1976.

The Dane-zaa of Fort St John took an adhesion to Treaty 8 in 1900. Today they continue to have a strong cultural and economic presence in the North Peace area.

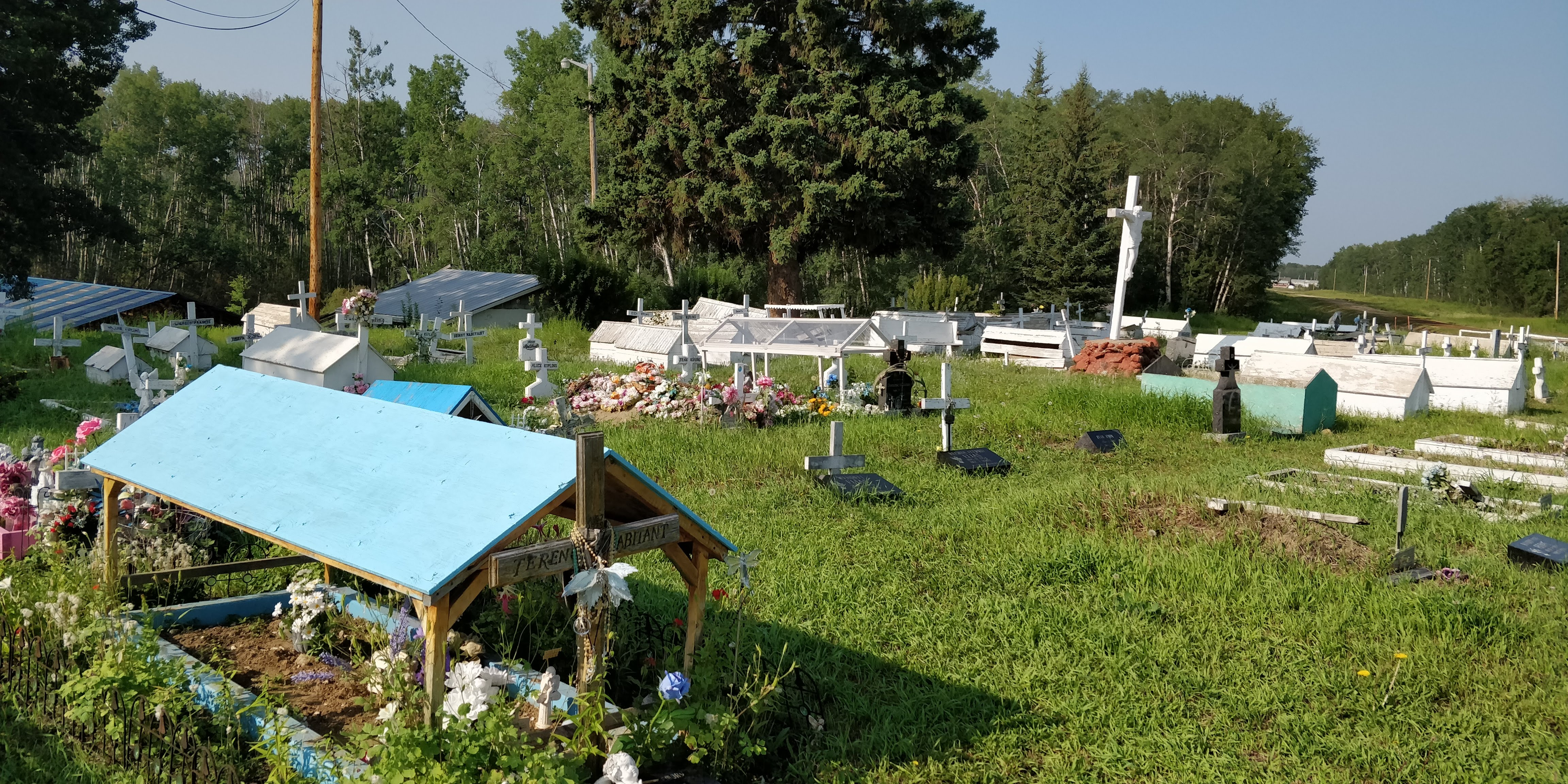
Dunne-za cemetery in High Level, Alberta

In collaboration with the elders of the Doig River First Nation, Robin and Jillian Ridington wrote Where Happiness Dwells: A History of the Dane-zaa First Nations, which was published by UBC Press in 2013. It features the oral history of the Dane-zaa from pre-history to the present day.

== Danezaa governments ==
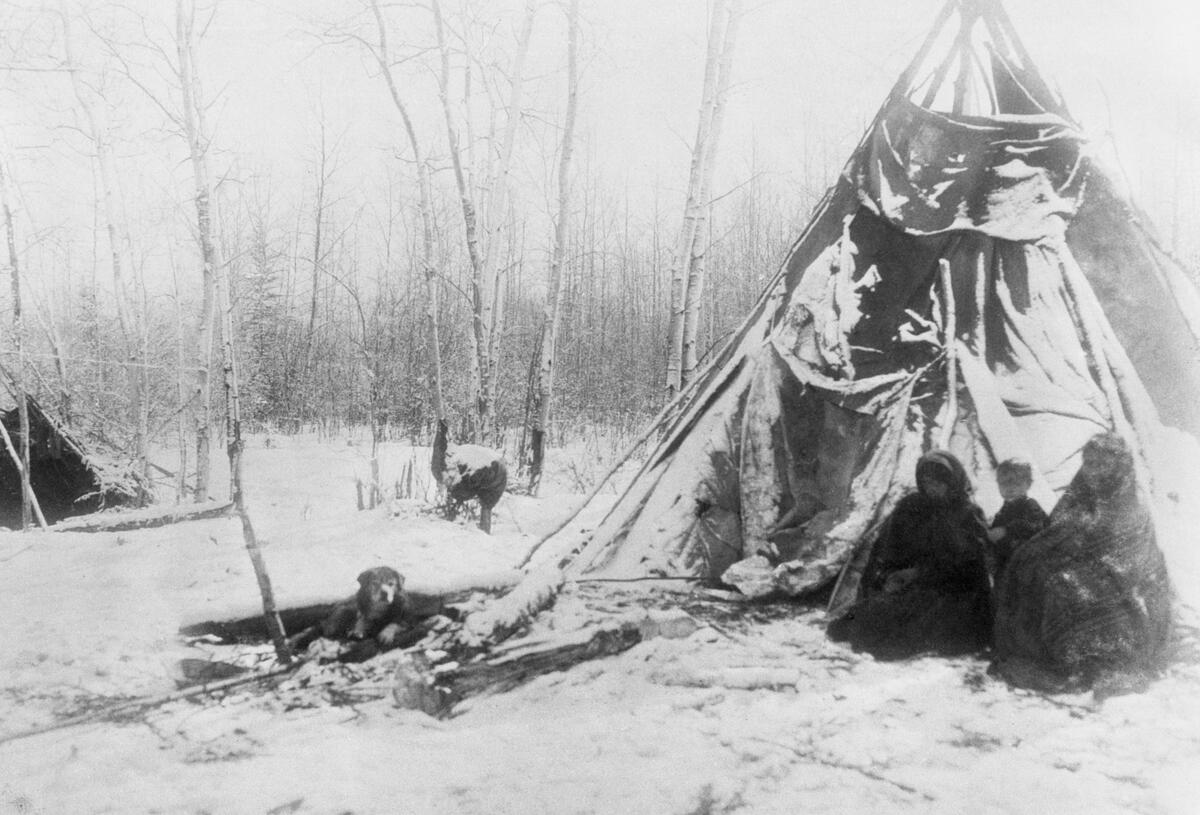
Dane-zaa tipi in winter near Peace River, Alberta, 1899

=== Treaty 8 Tribal Association ===
Treaty 8 Tribal Association members:

- Doig River First Nation (Dane-Za Adishtl'sh, takes its name from the Doig River (Hanás̱ Saahgéʔ) running through the reserve and has strong ties with the Blueberry River First Nation, band office is on the most populous reserve Blueberry River IR No. 206, Reserves: Beaton River IR No. 204 (North Half), Doig River IR No. 206, Population: 301)
- Blueberry River First Nations (was given this name because of the abundant supply of blueberries found in the river valley, band office is on the most populous reserve IR No. 205, about 80 km northwest of Fort St. John, Danezaa and Cree, Reserves: Beaton River No. 204 (South Half), Blueberry River IR No. 205, Population: 472)
- Halfway River First Nation (originally from Chowade River (Stony River) it was the last First Nation to move to its new location in the early sixties. Once forming with the West Moberly First Nation the Hudson Hope Band, the First Nations separated in 1971, the community is located 75 km northwest of Fort St. John, Reserve: Halfway River IR No. 168, Population: 268)
- Prophet River First Nation (Dene Tsaa First Nation, the First Nation is located 100 km south of Fort Nelson, Reserve: Prophet River IR No. 4, Population: 266)
- Saulteau First Nations (In the 1870s one group of Anishnaube (Saulteau) migrated westward from Manitoba and settled at Moberly Lake, where they later intermarried with the Nēhiyawēwin (Cree) and Danezaa (Beaver) who were already living in the area, the community is located at the east end of Moberly Lake, about 100 km southwest of Fort St. John, Reserve: East Moberly Lake IR No. 169, Population: 840)
- West Moberly First Nations (was originally part of the Hudson Hope Band, which split into West Moberly and Halfway River First Nations in 1971, the community is located at the west end of Moberly Lake, about 90 km southwest of Fort St. John, Danezaa and Cree, Reserve: West Moberly Lake No. 168A, Population: 275)

=== North Peace Tribal Council (NPTC) ===
North Peace Tribal Council members:

- Beaver First Nation has two reserves are both near Fort Vermilion, Alberta in the Peace Country of Northern Alberta, band office is on the most populous Reserve Beaver IR No. 164A, Reserves: Boyer IR No. 164 (Rocky Lane), Child Lake IR No. 164A (Eleske), Population: 1 027)

=== Western Cree Tribal Council ===
- Horse Lake First Nation is a First Nation headquartered in Hythe, Alberta. It is a party to Treaty 8, and despite being a member of the Western Cree Tribal Council, the Horse Lake nation is linguistically and culturally a part of the Danezaa or "Beavers". Reserves: Clear Hills IR No. 152C, Horse Lakes IR No. 152B, Population: 1 089)
