= Buick, British Columbia =

Buick Buick Creek
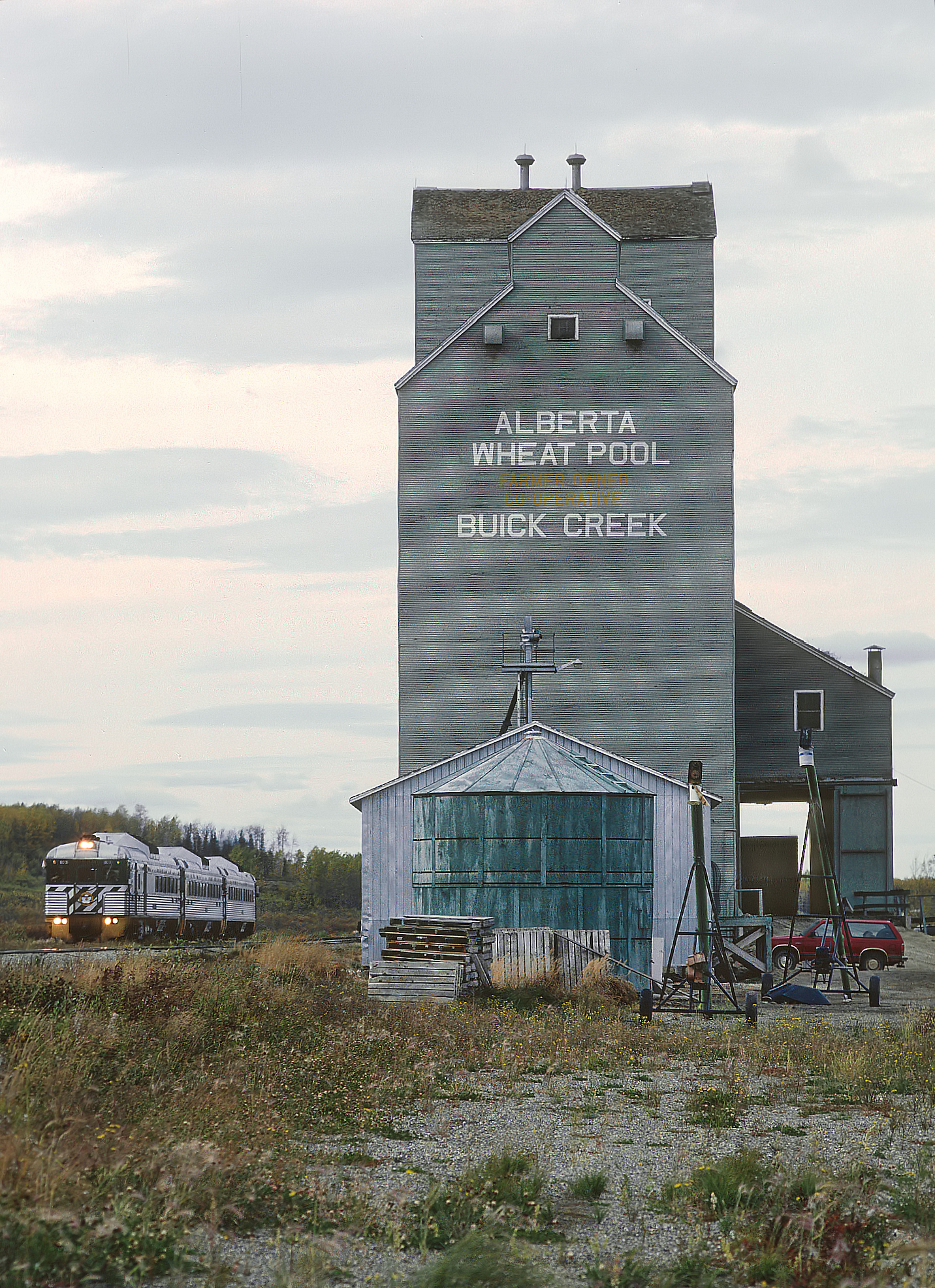
- Alberta Wheat Pool elevator in Buick, 1987. Now gone.

- Location of Buick in British Columbia
- Coordinates: 56°45′35″N 121°16′30″W
- Country: Canada
- Province: British Columbia
- Area codes: 250, 778

Buick (also known as Buick Creek) is a community in North-Eastern British Columbia, Canada.
