= Montney Formation =

Stratigraphical unit

- Stratigraphic range: Anisian
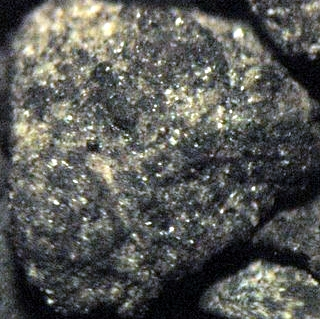
- Type: Geological formation
- Underlies: Doig Formation, Fernie Group
- Overlies: Belloy Formation
- Area: 130,000 square kilometres (50,190 sq mi)
- Thickness: up to 280 metres (920 ft)

Lithology
- Primary: Siltstone and shale
- Other: Dolomitic siltstone, sandstone

Location
- Coordinates: 56.57159°N 121.2219°W
- Region: British Columbia, Alberta
- Country: Canada

Type section
- Named for: Montney, British Columbia
- Named by: J.H. Armitage, 1962
- Montney Formation (Canada)

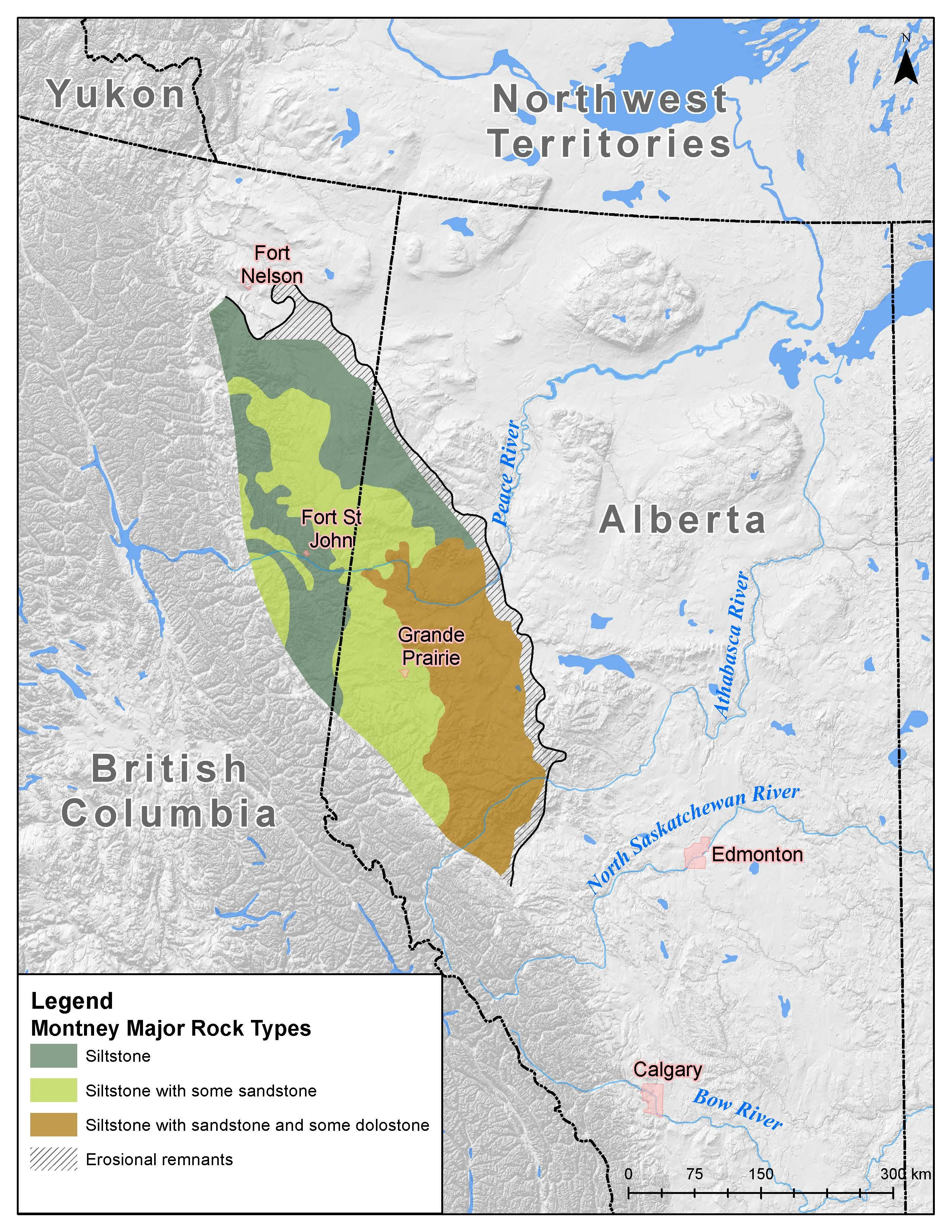
Montney Formation

The Montney Formation is a stratigraphic unit of Lower Triassic age in the Western Canadian Sedimentary Basin in British Columbia and Alberta.

It takes the name from the hamlet of Montney and was first described in Texaco's Buick Creek No. 7 well by J.H. Armitage in 1962. The well was drilled 41 kilometres (25 mi) north of Fort St. John, immediately east of the Alaska Highway.

== Lithology ==
The formation is composed of siltstone and dark grey shale, with dolomitic siltstone in the base and fine grained sandstone towards the top. The facies is shaley in the north and west of the extent (Fort St. John), silty in the center (Dawson Creek and Pouce Coupe areas) and becomes coarser (sandy) in western Alberta (Valleyview area).

=== Oil and gas production ===
The Montney Formation is a major shale gas and tight oil resource. A comprehensive joint study on the potential of the Montney Formation was completed by the National Energy Board, British Columbia Oil and Gas Commission and the Alberta Energy Regulator in 2013. This study found that the potential resources contained within the formation were 449 trillion cubic feet of marketable natural gas, 14,521 million barrels of marketable natural gas liquids (NGLs) and 1,125 million barrels of oil. This estimate makes it one of the largest known gas resources in the world and equivalent to 145 years of Canada's 2012 consumption. Montney has one of lowest full cycle cost of gas in North America - below US$3/Mcf with NGL uplift.

Gas is produced from the Montney Formation in both British Columbia and Alberta. Major operators include Seven Generations Energy Ltd., Progress Energy Canada Ltd. (a subsidiary of Malaysia's PETRONAS), Painted Pony Energy Ltd., Royal Dutch Shell plc, Encana Corporation, Murphy Oil Corporation, ARC Resources Ltd., and Advantage Oil & Gas Ltd. and oil is produced from the formation in Northern Alberta. Horizontal drilling and extensive fracturing process is necessary to have the fluid flow through the low permeability siltstone. Shale gas extraction emerged in the late 2000s in the distal facies of the formation's western extent.

== Hydraulic fracturing in Canada ==
Massive hydraulic fracturing has been widely used in Alberta since the late 1970s. The method is currently used in development of the Cardium, Duvernay, Montney and Viking formations in Alberta, Bakken formation in Saskatchewan, Montney and Horn River formations in British Columbia.

== Distribution ==
The Montney Formation reaches maximum thickness in the foothills of the northern Canadian Rockies at 280 meters (920 ft), and thins out towards the north up to the Fort Nelson area and towards the east to Peace River.

== Relationship to other units ==
Montney Formation is unconformably overlain by Jurassic or Cretaceous beds such as the Doig Formation or Fernie Group and unconformably underlain by the Permian or Carboniferous strata such as the Belloy Formation.
