= Doig River =

Location
- Country: Canada

Physical characteristics
- Source
  - location: Halverson Ridge, Clear Hills County, Alberta
  - coordinates: 56.99998°N 119.49797°W
  - elevation: 890 meters (2,920 ft)
- Mouth
  - location: Beatton River
  - coordinates: 56.42168°N 120.65752°W
  - elevation: 480 meters (1,570 ft)

The Doig River is a river in Alberta and northern British Columbia, Canada.

It originates on the northern fringes of Peace River Country in northern Alberta, south of the Chinchaga Wildland Park, in the Halverson Ridge of the Clear Hills, then flows westwards into British Columbia. It empties into the Beatton River, a tributary of the Peace River, at an elevation of 480 meters (1,570 ft).

Tributaries include the Square Creek, Betts Creek and Mearon Creek in Alberta; Adskwatim Creek, Osborn River, La Guarde Creek, and Siphon Creek in British Columbia.

The Indigenous community of Doig River is located in British Columbia along the river on reserve No 206, based on Treaty No. 8 and signed by the Beaver community as the last tribe in May 1900. There were 140 inhabitants in 2001, 125 thereof Indians. 50% of the inhabitants were fluent in the Athabascan (Beaver) language; 28,6% of the population spoke Beaver as their mother-tongue.

The Doig Airport is located at Doig, Alberta.

The Doig Formation, a Triassic age geological unit of the Western Canadian Sedimentary Basin was named for the river.

== See also ==
- List of rivers of Alberta
- List of rivers of British Columbia
