= West Moberly First Nations =

First Nations in British Columbia, Canada

West Moberly First Nations Band No. 545
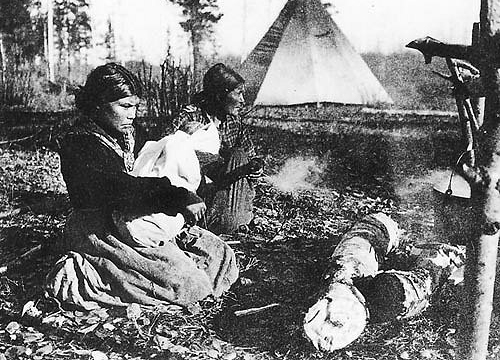
- Three generations of Dunne-za women at Moberly Lake c. 1899
- People: Dane-zaa and Cree
- Treaty: Treaty 8
- Province: British Columbia

Land
- Main reserve: West Moberly Lake 168A
- Land area: 20.336 km^{2}

Population (2021)
- On reserve: 121
- On other land: 9
- Off reserve: 228
- Total population: 358

Government
- Chief: Roland Willson
- Council: Asher Atchiqua; Theresa Davis; Robin Fuller; Clarence Willson

Tribal Council
- Treaty 8 Tribal Association

Website
- http://www.westmo.org/

West Moberly First Nations is a First Nation located in the Peace River Country in northern British Columbia. They are part of the Dunne-za and Cree cultural and language groups. West Moberly First Nations used to be part of the Hudson Hope Band, but in 1977 the band split becoming the modern-day Halfway River First Nation and West Moberly First Nations.

The Nation is located on the West Moberly Lake 168A reserve, at the west end of Moberly Lake, about 90 km (56 mi) southwest of Fort St. John, within territory covered by Treaty 8. Facilities on the reserve include the band administration office, the leadership offices, the lands management building, a community health centre, the Dakii Yadze childcare centre and the Dunne-za Lodge.

West Moberly is affiliated with the Treaty 8 Tribal Association, which is registered under the B.C. Societies Act.

== Governance ==
West Moberly First Nations Chief and Council consists of a generally elected Chief and four family Councillors that are elected according to the preference of each of the main families (Brown, Dokkie, Desjarlais, and Miller). West Moberly used to operate under a governance model set forward by Indigenous and Northern Affairs Canada (INAC), but a custom governance system was established in 2000. Under the custom governance system, every member over the age of 19 has a vote, and council may not proceed on any action without support from 50% + 1 of its membership.

=== Council composition history ===
Chief (term of office)	Ref	Brown Family Councillor (term of office)	Ref	Dokkie Family Councillor (term of office)	Ref	Desjarlais Family Councillor (term of office)	Ref	Miller Family Councillor (term of office)	Ref
Roland Willson (August 2000 – present)		Theresa Davis (December 2019 – present)		Asher Atchiqua (July 8, 2020 – present)		Robyn Fuller (September 20, 2016 – present)		Clarence Willson (June 3, 2002 – present)	
Roland Willson (August 2000 – present)		Theresa Davis (December 2019 – present)		Brad Dokkie (December 2019 - July 2020)		Robyn Fuller (September 20, 2016 – present)		Clarence Willson (June 3, 2002 – present)	
Roland Willson (August 2000 – present)		Patricia Brown (February 2016 - November 2019)		Dean Dokkie (at least October 2008 - November 2019)		Robyn Fuller (September 20, 2016 – present)		Clarence Willson (June 3, 2002 – present)	
Roland Willson (August 2000 – present)		Patricia Brown (February 2016 - November 2019)		Dean Dokkie (at least October 2008 - November 2019)		Laura Webb (at least October 2008 - September 19, 2016)		Clarence Willson (June 3, 2002 – present)	
Roland Willson (August 2000 – present)		Tim Davis (at least March 2015 - February 2016)		Dean Dokkie (at least October 2008 - November 2019)		Laura Webb (at least October 2008 - September 19, 2016)		Clarence Willson (June 3, 2002 – present)	
Roland Willson (August 2000 – present)		Kyle Brown (at least October 2008 - at latest March 2015)		Dean Dokkie (at least October 2008 - November 2019)		Laura Webb (at least October 2008 - September 19, 2016)		Clarence Willson (June 3, 2002 – present)	

== Treaty Process ==
The West Moberly First Nation is a signatory of the Treaty 8 but are now in discussions outside the BC Treaty Process, along with five other First Nations who have joined as the Treaty 8 Tribal Association.

== History ==
Prior to 1977, the people of West Moberly were part of the Hudson Hope Band, also referred to as the Hudson's Hope Indigenous Band, after the nearby region of Hudson's Hope, where a North West Company outpost had been established in 1805.

Some Crees and Saulteaux arrived in the area in the late nineteenth century, fleeing the North-West Rebellion of 1885.

In 1914, the Nation was admitted to Treaty 8 as part of the Hudson Hope Band, referred to in the 1914-1915 Indian Affairs Annual Report as "Hudson's Hope (Beaver) 116". The West Moberly Reserve 168A was established at the same time, the same size as it is today. They had not been admitted to the treaty earlier (as other nearby nations had) because the day the Treaty Commission arrived in 1899 "conflicted with the annual hunt." The Chief at the time was Chief Dokkie.

In 1977, the Hudson Hope Band split and became the modern West Moberly First Nations and Halfway River First Nation.

In the 1980s, West Moberly First Nations began hosting an annual celebration known as West Mo Days.

In 1996, West Moberly submitted its Treaty Land Entitlement claim, by which they hoped to receive the full extent of the land they were promised as signatories to Treaty 8. The claim was accepted for negotiation in 1998, but Canada did not appoint its first negotiation team until 2002.

Around 1999, during a full audit, West Moberly was found to have misspent, and was entered into a repayment program to the federal government. The community removed the council of the time, and appointed an interim council with a mandate to fix the Nation's financial troubles. The 1999 interim council included Roland Willson as a councillor, before he was acclaimed chief in 2000.

On September 5, 2002, members of the Kelly Lake First Nation (KLFN), set up a blockade at the Rat Lake entrance of the Wapiti River to demand their recognition as an independent first nation, separate from the West Moberly and Saulteau First Nations. Up until that point, members of KLFN had been members of the other two bands, despite KLFN having gained status in 1994. A few weeks after the blockade went up, Saulteau First Nations agreed to allow KLFN to separate from them.

Treaty Land Entitlement claim negotiations were suspended by Canada in 2004, then resumed in 2006 with a second negotiation team, and the team changed again in 2008. In 2015, the Nation described negotiations as "effectively stalled".

In 2004, the Nation headed up a study on petroleum contaminants after hunters noticed abnormalities in game. This study contributed to a change in how the BC Oil and Gas Commission dealt with reclamation fines.

In 2005, West Moberly, along with several other Nations under Treaty 8, began litigation around the definition of the western boundary of the treaty, which was defined in the original document as "due west to the central range of the Rocky Mountains, thence northwesterly along the said range to the point where it intersects the 60th parallel of north latitude," but defined differently in the map attached to Order in Council 2749 (1898). On September 27, 2017, the Supreme Court of British Columbia ruled in West Moberly First Nations v. British Columbia that the western boundary was "the height of land along the continental divide between the Arctic and Pacific watersheds," rather than an interpretation proposed by the Province and the Kaska Dena Council (and, on appeal, the McLeod Lake First Nation) of a boundary of the height of the Rocky Mountains. The British Columbia Court of Appeal upheld the ruling in May 2020.

== Demographics ==
=== Population history ===
Date	Number of band members	Ref
July 2009	207	
May 2016	140 (on-reserve)	
July 2021	358	

== Social, educational and cultural programs and facilities ==
=== Klinse-Za Caribou Maternity Pen ===
In 2014, the West Moberly First Nations and Saulteau First Nations jointly began a caribou penning project to stabilize and regrow the Klinse-Za caribou herd. The caribou populations had been devastated by industrial development in the region, including the severing of a major migration route by the construction of the W. A. C. Bennett Dam in the 1960s. The project is primarily run by members of the two founding nations, and involves the capture and transportation of pregnant caribou cows every March to the 15-hectare pen on a mountaintop in the Misinchinka Ranges, where they are tagged, protected, and cared for while their calves are young, and then released in mid-summer, once the calves are old enough to survive in the wild. From an initial population of 36 animals in 2014 (including some taken from the Scott herd), the herd had grown to 95 as of July 2020. The project has received funding from crowdfunding, provincial and federal government organizations, and some resource extraction companies including TransCanada, Teck Resources, Canadian Natural Resources Limited, Spectra Energy. The project also receives technical assistance from Wildlife Infometrics Inc and West Fraser Timber.

In less than a decade, the collaborative program had succeeded in bringing the herd back from extinction. A March 23, 2022 article in the Ecological Applications journal cited West Moberly Elders saying that caribou were once so numerous that they were "like bugs on the landscape". The herd had declined from ~250 in the 1990s to 38 in 2013, then with the program, had increased to 114.

=== Dakii Yadze Out Of School Care Centre ===
As of October 2019 and since at least September 2011, the Dakii Yadze Centre has operated a licensed child care program on weekdays to serve the families of West Moberly. The centre emphasizes holistic programming and play-based learning in its mission statement.

=== Dunne-za Lodge ===
The Dunne-za Lodge is a year-round retreat destination located on the northwest shore of Moberly Lake, with 30 acres of land, cabins that are available for rent, and a meeting space. The First Nations' website states that the lodge "is used to showcase our culture, traditions, host community events, cultural healing camps and other special events hosted by West Moberly First Nations".
