= Halfway River First Nation =

Coordinates: 56°28′26″N 121°52′51.6″W

- Band No. 546
- Treaty: Treaty 8
- Province: British Columbia

Land
- Main reserve: Halfway River 168
- Land area: 3,988 ha (9,850 acres)

Population (2024)
- On reserve: 137
- On other land: 7
- Off reserve: 157
- Total population: 317

Government
- Chief: Darlene Hunter
- Council: Linda Brady; William Field; Lori Ann Wokeley; Joyce Audit; Annette Davis; Charmaine Hunter

Tribal Council
- Treaty 8 Tribal Association

Website
- Halfway River First Nation

Halfway River First Nation is a Dunneza First Nations government with a 3988 ha reserve located 75 km northwest of Fort St. John, British Columbia. It is a Treaty 8 nation.

The Halfway River people were at one point part of the "Hudson Hope Indian Band" but in 1971 they split off, and the remaining people formed West Moberly First Nations. As of January 2024, there were 317 registered members, with 137 living on the reserve.

The current chief is Darlene Hunter (replacing Russell Lily in December 2013)

== History ==
=== Past Chiefs and Councils ===
- Chief Darlene Hunter (2013–present) with William Field, Lori Ann Wokeley, Linda Brady, Annette Davis, Joyce Audit, Charmaine Hunter
- Chief Russell Lily (2011–2013) with Coleen Achla and William Field
- Chief Ed Whitford (2008–2011)
