= Schooler Creek Group =

Stratigraphic Group in Western Canada

- Stratigraphic range: Ladinian to Norian
- Type: Geological group
- Sub-units: Bocock Formation, Pardonet Formation, Baldonnel Formation, Ludington Formation, Charlie Lake Formation, Halfway Formation
- Underlies: Fernie, Bullhead, Fort St. John Group
- Overlies: Toad Formation, Doig Formation
- Thickness: up to 730 feet (220 m)

Lithology
- Primary: Limestone, dolomite
- Other: Siltstone, shale, evaporite minerals

Location
- Coordinates: 56.2769°N 120.9836°W
- Region: British Columbia
- Country: Canada

Type section
- Named by: F.H. McLearn, 1921

The Schooler Creek Group is a stratigraphic unit of Middle to Late Triassic (Ladinian to Norian) age in the Western Canadian Sedimentary Basin. It is present in northeastern British Columbia. It was named for Schooler Creek, a left tributary of Williston Lake, and was first described in two oil wells (Pacific Fort St. John No. 16 and Southern Production No. B-14-1) northwest of Fort St. John, by F.H. McLearn in 1921. Exposures along Williston Lake serve as a type locality in outcrop.

== Lithology ==
The Schooler Creek Group is composed of limestone and dolomite, with subordinate siltstone, shale, sandstone, and evaporite minerals such as gypsum and anhydrite.

== Distribution ==
The Schooler Creek Group outcrops in the foothills of the northern Canadian Rockies in northeastern British Columbia, where it reaches its maximum thickness of 730 feet (220 m). In the subsurface, it extends throughout the plains of the Peace River Country. The Pardonet Formation has its type locality at Pardonet Hill, on the south shore of the Williston Lake at 56.05328°N 123.01889°W.

== Relationship to other units ==
The Schooler Creek Group is unconformably overlain by the Fernie shale, or by the Bullhead or Fort St. John Group. It conformably overlies the Toad Formation or the Doig Formation.

=== Subdivisions ===
The Schooler Creek Group has the following sub-divisions from top to base:

Sub-unit	Age	Lithology	Thickness	Reference
Bocock Formation	late Norian	aphanitic crystalline and bioclastic limestone	63 metres (210 ft)	
Pardonet Formation	Norian	limestone, silty limestone, siltstone, rare shale	137 metres (450 ft)	
Baldonnel Formation	Carnian	limestone, dolomite, with interbeds of siltstone and very fine grained sandstone	146 metres (480 ft)	
Ludington Formation	Carnian	dolomitic and calcareous siltstone, sandstone, bioclastic limestone	500 metres (1,640 ft)	
Charlie Lake Formation	Carnian	aeolian sandstones, limestone, dolomite and evaporite minerals such as anhydrite. Deposited in a series of sand dunes and sabkah environments similar to the modern Coastal Ergs of Namibia.	550 metres (1,800 ft)	
Halfway Formation	early Ladinian to Carnian	sandstone, with interbeds of siltstone, dolomite and limestone	416 metres (1,360 ft)	
