= Moberly Lake (British Columbia) =

Lake in British Columbia, Canada

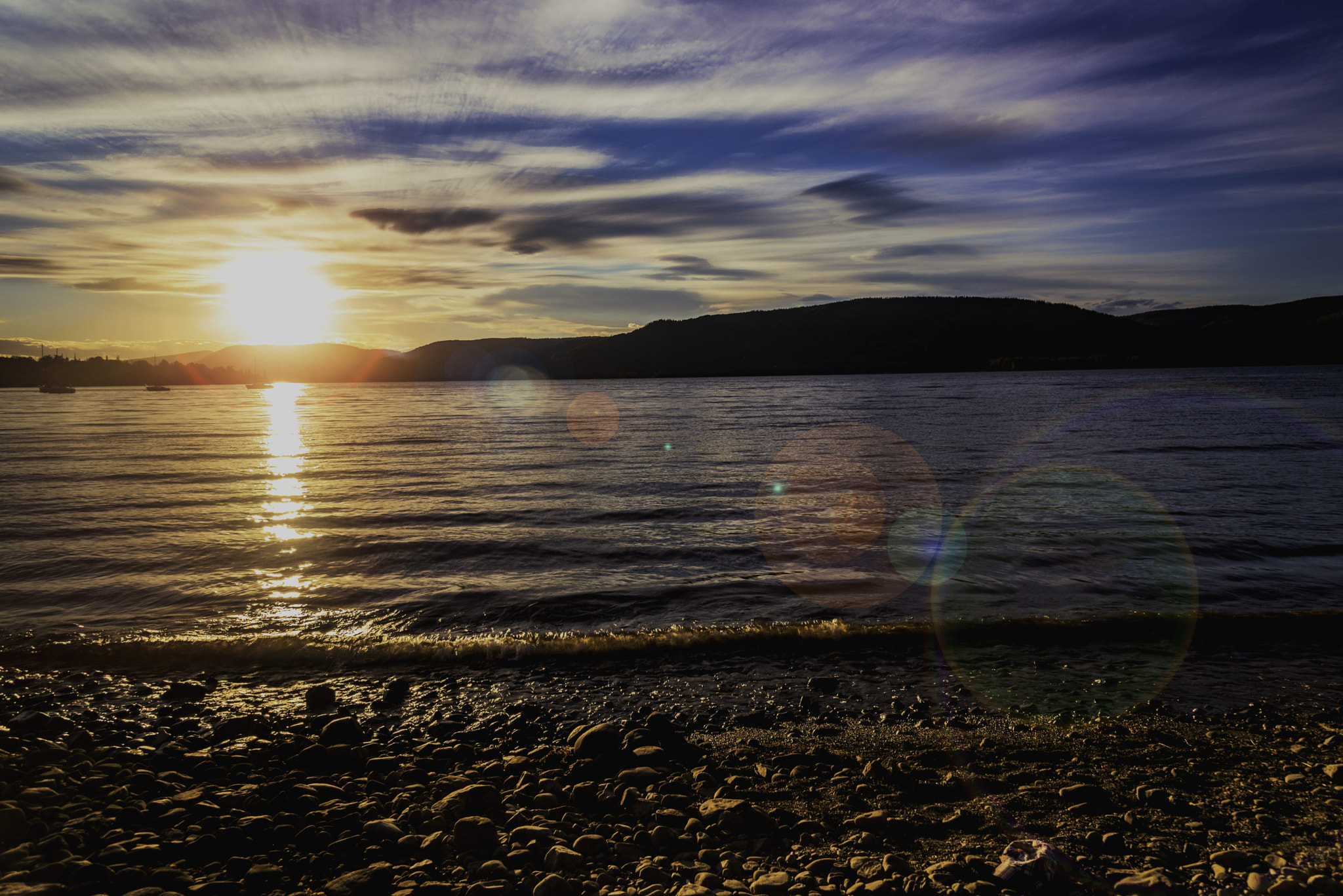

- Location within British Columbia
- Location: British Columbia
- Coordinates: 55.823°N 121.762°W
- Type: oligotrophic
- Primary inflows: Moberly River
- Basin countries: Canada
- Surface area: 29.4 km^{2} (11.4 sq mi)
- Average depth: 18.3 m (60 ft)
- Max. depth: 42.7 m (140 ft)
- Water volume: 534×10^{6} m^{3} (433,000 acre⋅ft)
- Residence time: 2.4 years
- Surface elevation: 692 m (2,270 ft)

Moberly Lake is along British Columbia Highway 29 in northern British Columbia, Canada, and named for Henry John Moberly, a fur trader who lived on the lake. It is served by the Chetwynd Royal Canadian Mounted Police (RCMP) detachment.

The Moberly Lake has always been a revered site for the Danezaa people, who called it "the lake you can depend on," an allusion to the bounty of the lake, where they could always find food.

In 1915, the outsider settlement comprised 16 people (Fort George Herald, 9 Oct 1915).

== Legends ==
Other Danezaa regarded the lake as a place of mystique. For them, it was 'the Lake with a hole through it' or 'the lake with no bottom'. According to their lore, the lake was the dwelling place of an ancient creature that came to the surface after long intervals below the water.

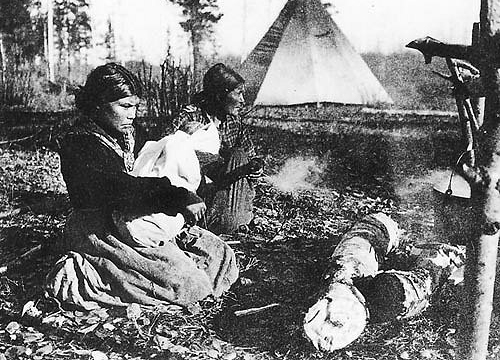
Three generations of Beaver (Dunneza) women at Moberly Lake, British Columbia.

== See also ==
- List of rivers of British Columbia
