= Treaty 8 Tribal Association =

Association of six Peace River Country First Nations bands in Canada

Treaty 8 Tribal Association (T8TA) is an association of six of the eight Peace River Country First Nations bands who are signatories to Treaty 8 in northeastern British Columbia. They have joined in an effort to negotiate with British Columbia and Canada outside the British Columbia Treaty Process.

Incorporated in 1982 under the BC Societies Act, T8TA is primarily funded by the federal Department of Crown–Indigenous Relations and Northern Affairs.

== Members ==
- Doig River First Nation – Northeast of Fort St. John, BC
- Fort Nelson First Nation – Fort Nelson, BC
- Halfway River First Nation – Northwest of Fort St. John, BC
- Prophet River First Nation – South of Fort Nelson, BC
- Saulteau First Nations – Chetwynd, BC
- West Moberly First Nations – Peace River Country in northern BC

== Treaty process ==
Blueberry River First Nations retained lawyer and academic Murray Rankin who successfully negotiated the first Economic Benefits Agreement relating to natural resources revenues in British Columbia.

== See also ==
- List of tribal councils in British Columbia
