= Scatter River Old Growth Provincial Park =

Provincial park in British Columbia, Canada

- IUCN category II (national park)
- Location within British Columbia
- Interactive map of Scatter River Old Growth Provincial Park
- Location: British Columbia, Canada
- Nearest city: Fort St. John
- Coordinates: 59°37′52″N 124°40′54″W
- Area: 11.4 km^{2} (4.4 sq mi)
- Established: June 28, 1999
- Governing body: BC Parks

Scatter River Old Growth Provincial Park is a provincial park in British Columbia, Canada, located on the Liard River downstream from Liard River Hot Springs Provincial Park and Liard River Corridor Provincial Park and Protected Area. The park includes the Grand Canyon of the Liard, a 30 km stretch of canyon and whitewater between the Toad and Trout River converges with the Liard. The park includes high upland plateau and muskeg as well as stands of old growth spruce forests. Established in 1999, the park is c.1140 ha. in area.

== See also ==
- Terminal Range
- Sentinel Range (Canada)
- Toad River Hot Springs Provincial Park
