= Terminal Range =

Mountain range in British Columbia, Canada

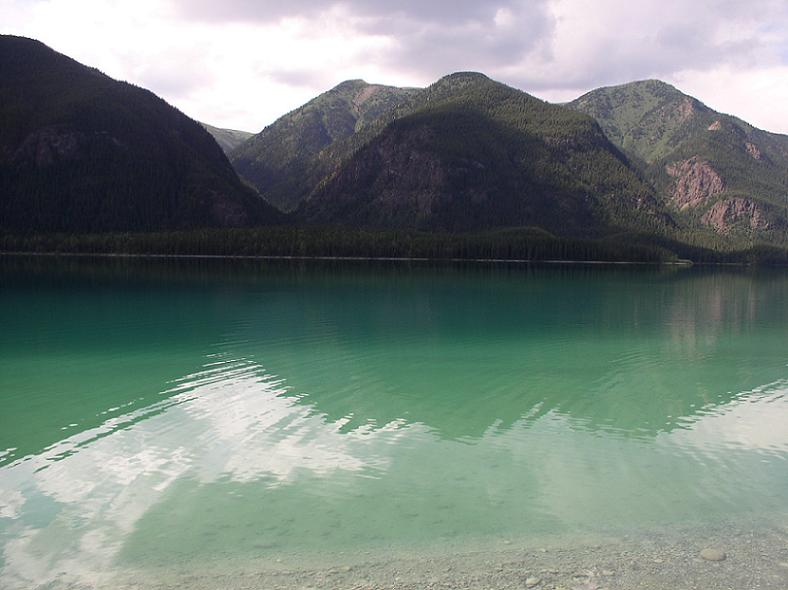
- Terminal Range and Muncho Lake seen from the Alaska Highway

Highest point
- Elevation: 1,772 m (5,814 ft)
- Listing: Ranges of the Canadian Rockies

Geography
- Location within British Columbia Location within Canada
- Country: Canada
- Province: British Columbia
- Range coordinates: 59°15′N 126°13′W
- Parent range: Muskwa Ranges; Canadian Rockies
- Borders on: Sentinel Range
- Topo map: NTS 94N/04

The Terminal Range is the northernmost mountain range of the Canadian Rockies, so-named for its position at the northern terminus of the Rockies. Lying west of Muncho Lake and the Trout River, its northern perimeter is the Liard River. The Sentinel Range lies to its east.

== See also ==
- Liard River, British Columbia
- Toad River Hot Springs Provincial Park
- Muncho Lake Provincial Park
- Liard River Hot Springs Provincial Park
