= Muncho Pass =

Mountain pass in the Rocky Mountain

- Location within British Columbia
- Elevation: 1,095 m (3,593 ft)
- Traversed by: Highway 97 (Alaska Highway)

Third Approach
- Location: British Columbia, Canada
- Range: Canadian Rockies
- Coordinates: 58°49′57″N 125°43′49″W
- Topo map: NTS 94K13 Muncho Lake

Muncho Pass (el. 1,095 m or 3,593 ft), also known as Muncho Lake Pass, Drogheda Lake Pass, or Muncho-Toad Pass, is the northernmost mountain pass in the Rocky Mountains to be traversed by a public highway. Located in Muncho Lake Provincial Park, British Columbia, Canada, the pass links the Toad River and Trout River drainages. The Alaska Highway travels across the pass.

== See also ==
- Sentinel Range (Canada)
- Terminal Range
