= Muskwa =

Muskwa is a region in north-eastern British Columbia, part of the Muskwa-Kechika Management Area. The name comes from the Cree word for bear (maskwa). The term can refer to:

- Muskwa River, a 250 km long tributary of the Fort Nelson River
- Muskwa Formation, a gas producing geological formation in the Western Canadian Sedimentary Basin
- Muskwa Ranges, a northern range in the Canadian Rocky Mountains
- Muskwa, British Columbia, a small settlement in northern British Columbia, located south of Fort Nelson
