= Muncho Lake, British Columbia =

Muncho Lake
- Location of Muncho Lake in British Columbia Muncho Lake (Canada)
- Coordinates: 58°56′17″N 125°46′03″W
- Country: Canada
- Province: British Columbia
- Regional district: Northern Rockies Regional Municipality
- Elevation: 848 m (2,782 ft)
- Time zone: UTC-07:00 (Mountain Standard Time)
- Postal codes: V0C 0B8, V0C 1Z0
- Area codes: 250

Muncho Lake is a highway services community in northern British Columbia, Canada, located at Mile 462 on Highway 97, the Alaska Highway, within Muncho Lake Provincial Park and on the south end of the lake of the same name. The community consists almost entirely of travel and tourism-related businesses such as lodging, game outfitting, restaurants, gas stations and fishing outfitting.

== Climate ==
Climate data for Muncho Lake (1981-2010): 836m
Month	Jan	Feb	Mar	Apr	May	Jun	Jul	Aug	Sep	Oct	Nov	Dec	Year
Record high °C (°F)	10.5 (50.9)	15.0 (59.0)	15.0 (59.0)	23.9 (75.0)	34.0 (93.2)	32.5 (90.5)	34.0 (93.2)	32.8 (91.0)	30.5 (86.9)	25.5 (77.9)	13.3 (55.9)	13.0 (55.4)	34.0 (93.2)
Mean daily maximum °C (°F)	−8.9 (16.0)	−5.5 (22.1)	−0.3 (31.5)	7.9 (46.2)	14.0 (57.2)	18.9 (66.0)	20.5 (68.9)	19.1 (66.4)	13.5 (56.3)	6.1 (43.0)	−4.1 (24.6)	−6.4 (20.5)	6.2 (43.2)
Daily mean °C (°F)	−14.1 (6.6)	−11.5 (11.3)	−6.9 (19.6)	1.5 (34.7)	7.2 (45.0)	12.1 (53.8)	14.1 (57.4)	12.7 (54.9)	7.9 (46.2)	1.4 (34.5)	−8.6 (16.5)	−11.2 (11.8)	0.4 (32.7)
Mean daily minimum °C (°F)	−19.2 (−2.6)	−17.5 (0.5)	−13.4 (7.9)	−5.0 (23.0)	0.4 (32.7)	5.3 (41.5)	7.6 (45.7)	6.2 (43.2)	2.2 (36.0)	−3.3 (26.1)	−13.1 (8.4)	−16.0 (3.2)	−5.5 (22.1)
Record low °C (°F)	−50.4 (−58.7)	−45.0 (−49.0)	−40.0 (−40.0)	−29.0 (−20.2)	−18.0 (−0.4)	−3.5 (25.7)	−0.6 (30.9)	−5.0 (23.0)	−12.8 (9.0)	−32.5 (−26.5)	−40.0 (−40.0)	−48.0 (−54.4)	−50.4 (−58.7)
Average precipitation mm (inches)	38.4 (1.51)	25.9 (1.02)	19.0 (0.75)	17.4 (0.69)	43.8 (1.72)	63.3 (2.49)	92.1 (3.63)	71.4 (2.81)	45.0 (1.77)	36.6 (1.44)	31.5 (1.24)	28.0 (1.10)	512.3 (20.17)
Average rainfall mm (inches)	0.5 (0.02)	0.3 (0.01)	0.3 (0.01)	5.4 (0.21)	37.8 (1.49)	62.8 (2.47)	92.1 (3.63)	71.0 (2.80)	43.1 (1.70)	17.6 (0.69)	2.1 (0.08)	0.4 (0.02)	333.3 (13.12)
Average snowfall cm (inches)	38.0 (15.0)	25.6 (10.1)	18.6 (7.3)	12.0 (4.7)	6.0 (2.4)	0.5 (0.2)	0 (0)	0.4 (0.2)	1.9 (0.7)	18.9 (7.4)	29.4 (11.6)	27.6 (10.9)	179.0 (70.5)
Average precipitation days	10.1	8.1	6.5	6.4	13.3	16.2	20.7	17.3	16.0	13.5	11.4	8.8	148.3
Average rainy days	0.31	0.12	0.15	2.6	12.6	16.2	20.7	17.3	15.6	8.4	0.96	0.21	95.2
Average snowy days	9.9	8.0	6.3	4.4	1.2	0.12	0	0.15	0.81	6.2	10.8	8.5	56.2
Source: Environment Canada

== See also ==
- Muncho Pass
- Sentinel Range (Canada)
