= Muncho Lake =

Lake in British Columbia, Canada

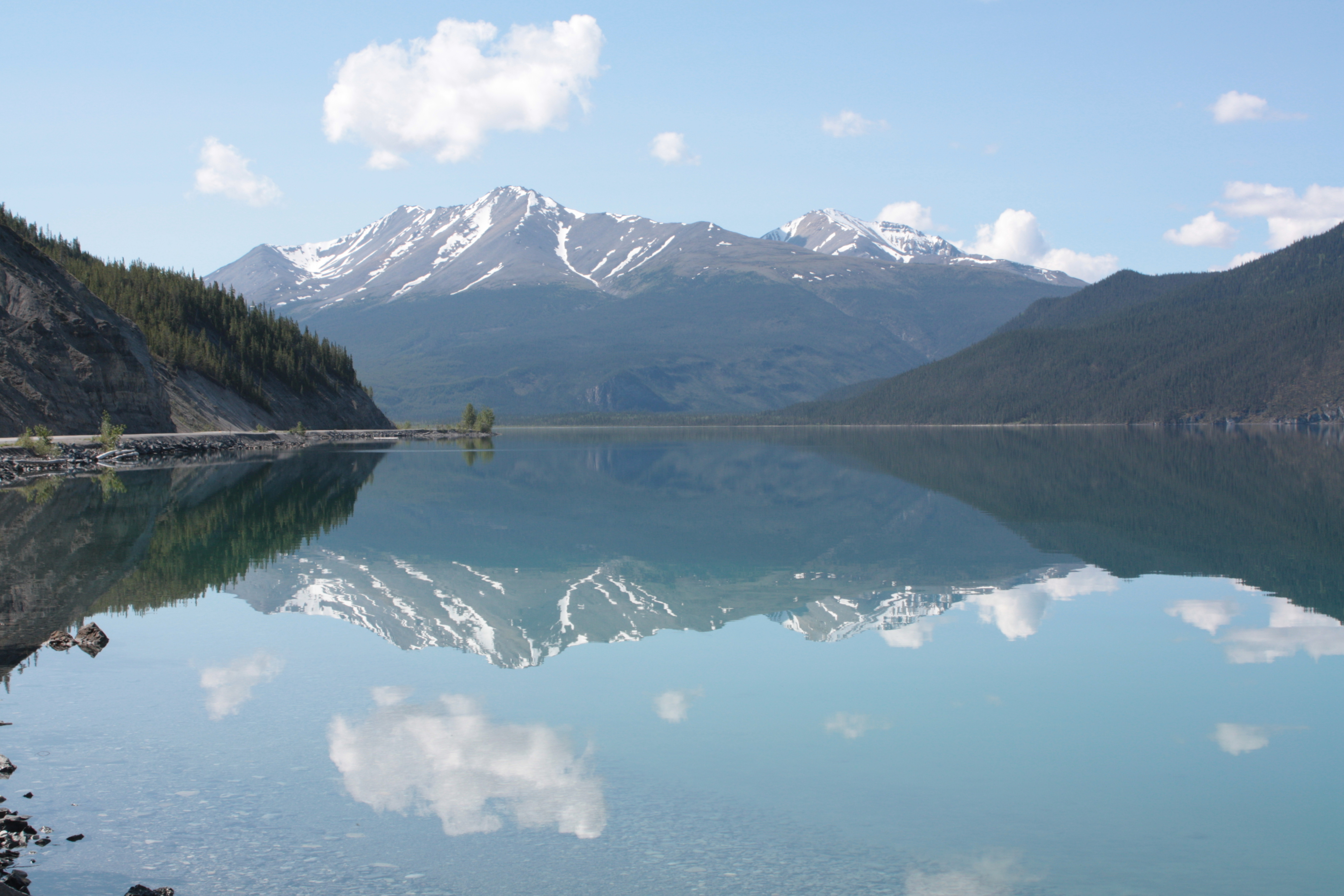

- Location within British Columbia
- Location: British Columbia
- Coordinates: 59°00′N 125°46′W
- Primary inflows: Trout River, Muncho Creek
- Primary outflows: Trout River
- Max. length: 12 kilometres (7.5 mi)
- Max. width: 1.6 kilometres (0.99 mi)
- Max. depth: 223 m (732 ft)
- Surface elevation: 820 m (2,690 ft)
- Settlements: Muncho Lake, British Columbia

Muncho Lake is a lake in northern British Columbia, Canada.

== Geography ==
The lake is part of the Muncho Lake Provincial Park and located at kilometre 681 (mile 423) of the Alaska Highway. The lake is about 12 km (7.5 mi) long and its width varies. It reaches a maximum depth of 110 m (360 ft). The surrounding peaks (the Terminal Range of the Muskwa Ranges to the west and the Sentinel Range to the east) reach altitudes of more than 2,000 m (6,600 ft), while the lake lies at an elevation of 820 m (2,690 ft). It is formed along the Trout River, a tributary of the Liard River.

The jade-green color of the lake is attributed to the presence of copper oxide leached from the bedrock underneath. Its name is derived from the Kaska language in which "muncho" translates as "big water".

The small community of Muncho Lake is established on the lake's southern shore, at the confluence of Trout River and Muncho Creek. The Muncho Lake/Mile 462 Water Aerodrome is set up along the eastern shore of the lake, at Mile 462 of the Alaska Highway.

== See also ==
- List of lakes of British Columbia
- Muncho Pass
- Sentinel Range (Canada)
