= Fort Nelson Airport =

Northern Rockies Regional Airport Fort Nelson Airport
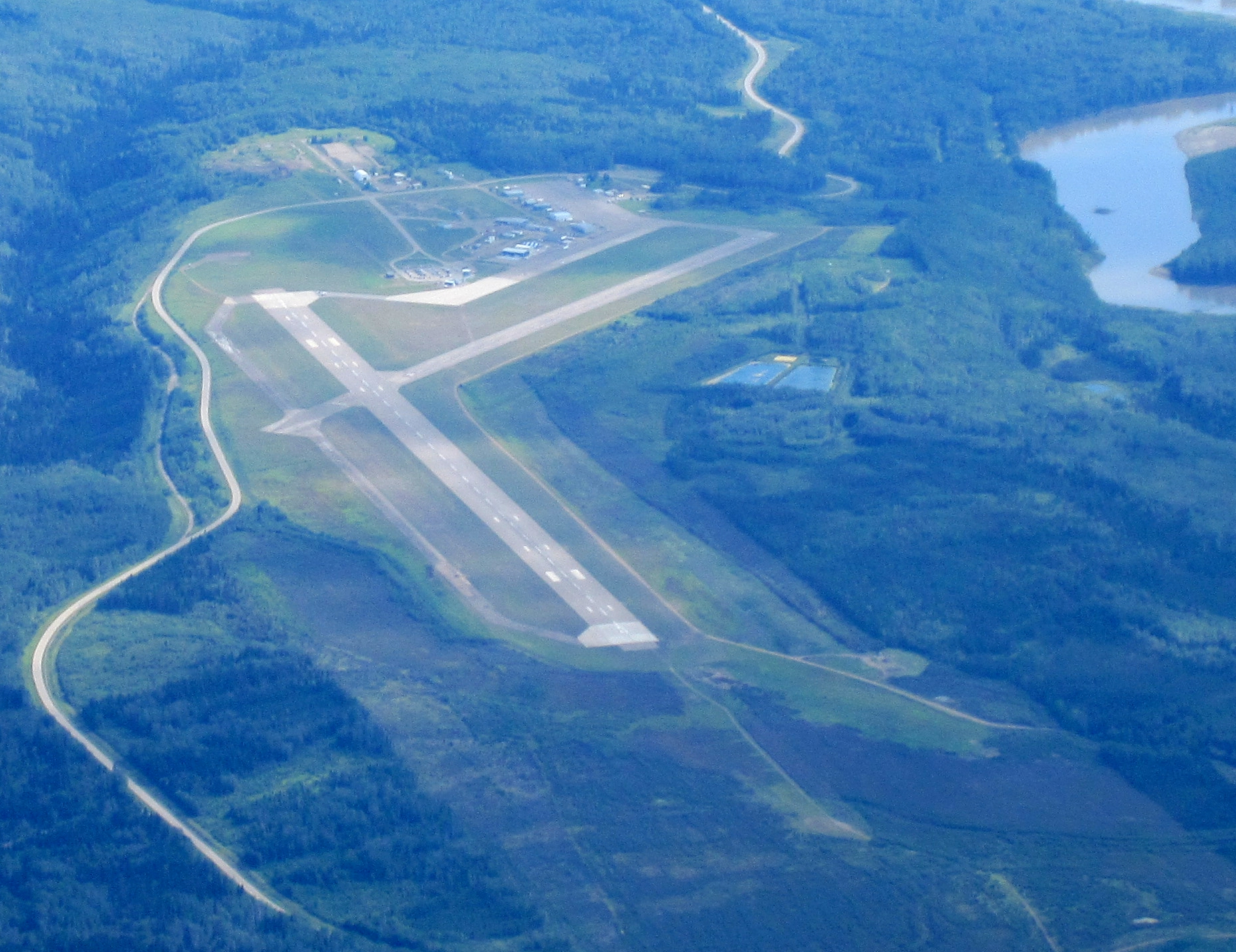
- Fort Nelson Airport, BC
- IATA: YYE; ICAO: CYYE; WMO: 71945

Summary
- Airport type: Public
- Operator: Northern Rockies Regional Municipality
- Location: Fort Nelson, British Columbia
- Time zone: MST (UTC−07:00)
- Elevation AMSL: 1,253 ft / 382 m
- Coordinates: 58°50′14″N 122°36′05″W
- Website: https://www.northernrockies.ca/en/live-here/regional-airport.aspx

Map
- Location in British Columbia

Runways
Direction	Length		Surface
Direction	ft	m	Surface
04/22	6,402	1,951	Asphalt
08/26	3,575	1,090	Asphalt

Statistics (2010)
- Aircraft movements: 21,371
- Sources: Canada Flight Supplement; Environment Canada; Movements from Statistics Canada

Northern Rockies Regional Airport (Fort Nelson Airport) (IATA: YYE, ICAO: CYYE) is located 3.8 nautical miles (7.0 km; 4.4 mi) east northeast of Fort Nelson, British Columbia, Canada.

== Airlines and destinations ==
Airlines	Destinations
Central Mountain Air	Prince George

== History ==
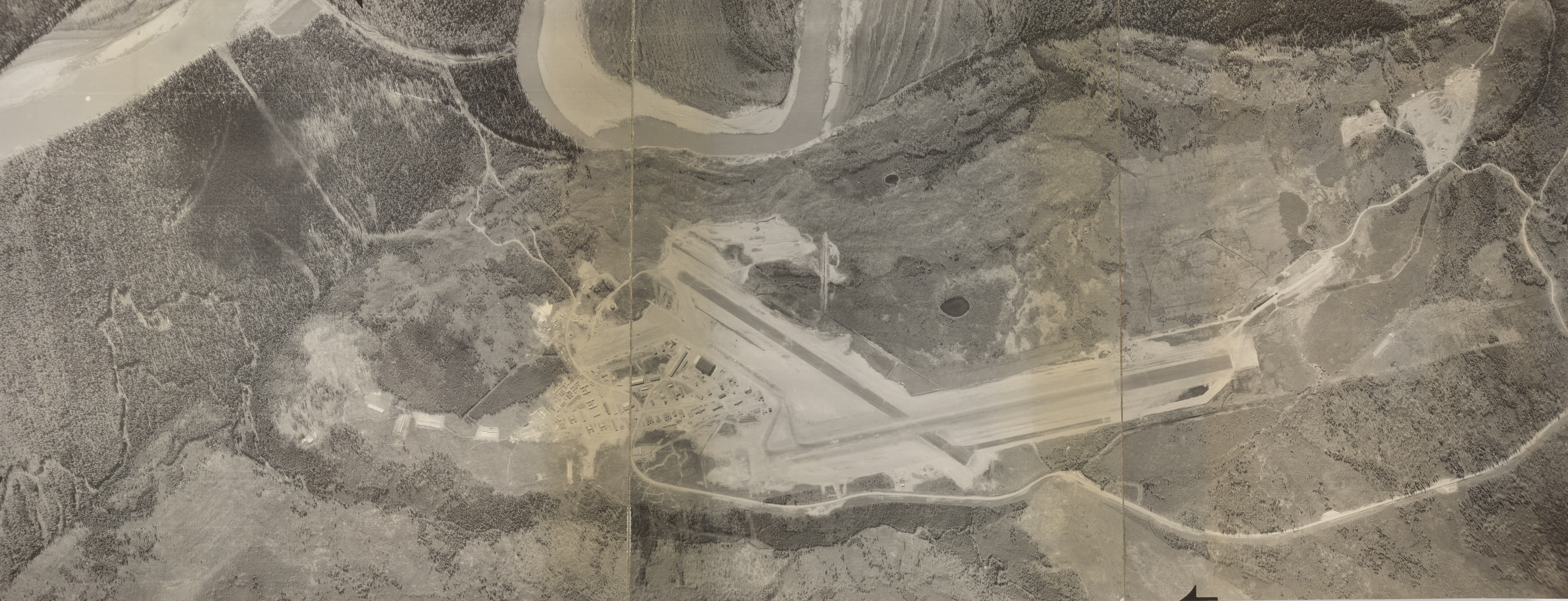
Aerial image, 1944

The Northern Rockies Regional Airport was established in 1941 as part of the United States Army Air Forces (USAAF) Northwest Staging Route and was used to ferry and refuel aircraft en route to Russia during World War II. The building of the airport was logistically challenging, as Fort Nelson lies 180 air miles north-north-west of Fort St. John and required traveling over roads only passable in winter or dry weather, or via dog team along frozen rivers; in the summer months, material was carried by rail and then transported by steamship up the Athabasca, Slave and McKenzie rivers, and then via barge up the Liard and Fort Nelson rivers. The first working runway was put in commission on Sept 1, 1941.

In approximately 1942 the aerodrome was listed as RCAF Aerodrome - Fort Nelson, British Columbia at 58°50′N 122°40′W with a variation of 34 degrees east and elevation of 1,170 ft (360 m). The aerodrome was listed as "Under Construction - Servicable" with two runways listed as follows:

Runway name	Length	Width	Surface
2/20	6,400 ft (2,000 m)	200 ft (61 m)	Hard
7/25	4,800 ft (1,500 m)	200 ft (61 m)	Hard

=== Historical airline service ===
Commencing during the early 1940s, scheduled passenger service was operated in the past by Canadian Pacific Air Lines and its successors CP Air and Canadian Airlines International to Vancouver, British Columbia; Edmonton, Alberta; Prince George, British Columbia; Fort St. John, British Columbia, Watson Lake, Yukon and Whitehorse, Yukon. CP Air served the airport with Boeing 737-200 jetliners during the 1970s with direct, no change of plane flights to all of the above destinations. Other Canadian Pacific flights into the airport over the years were operated with such twin engine prop aircraft as the Lockheed Lodestar, the Douglas DC-3 and the Convair 240 as well as with the larger, four engine Douglas DC-6B propliner and the Bristol Britannia turboprop. Another airline which served Fort Nelson during the mid 1970s was International Jetair operating nonstop flights several days a week to Inuvik with continuing one stop service to Whitehorse, Yukon flown with Lockheed L-188 Electra turboprop aircraft. In 1994, Canadian Partner code sharing service on behalf of Canadian Airlines International was being operated with de Havilland Canada DHC-8 Dash 8 turboprops and/or Fokker F28 Fellowship jets to the airport from Vancouver, Edmonton, Grande Prairie and Fort St. John.

== See also ==
- Fort Nelson (Parker Lake) Water Aerodrome
- Fort Nelson/Gordon Field Airport
- Fort Nelson/Mobil Sierra Airport
