= Toad River, British Columbia =

Toad River
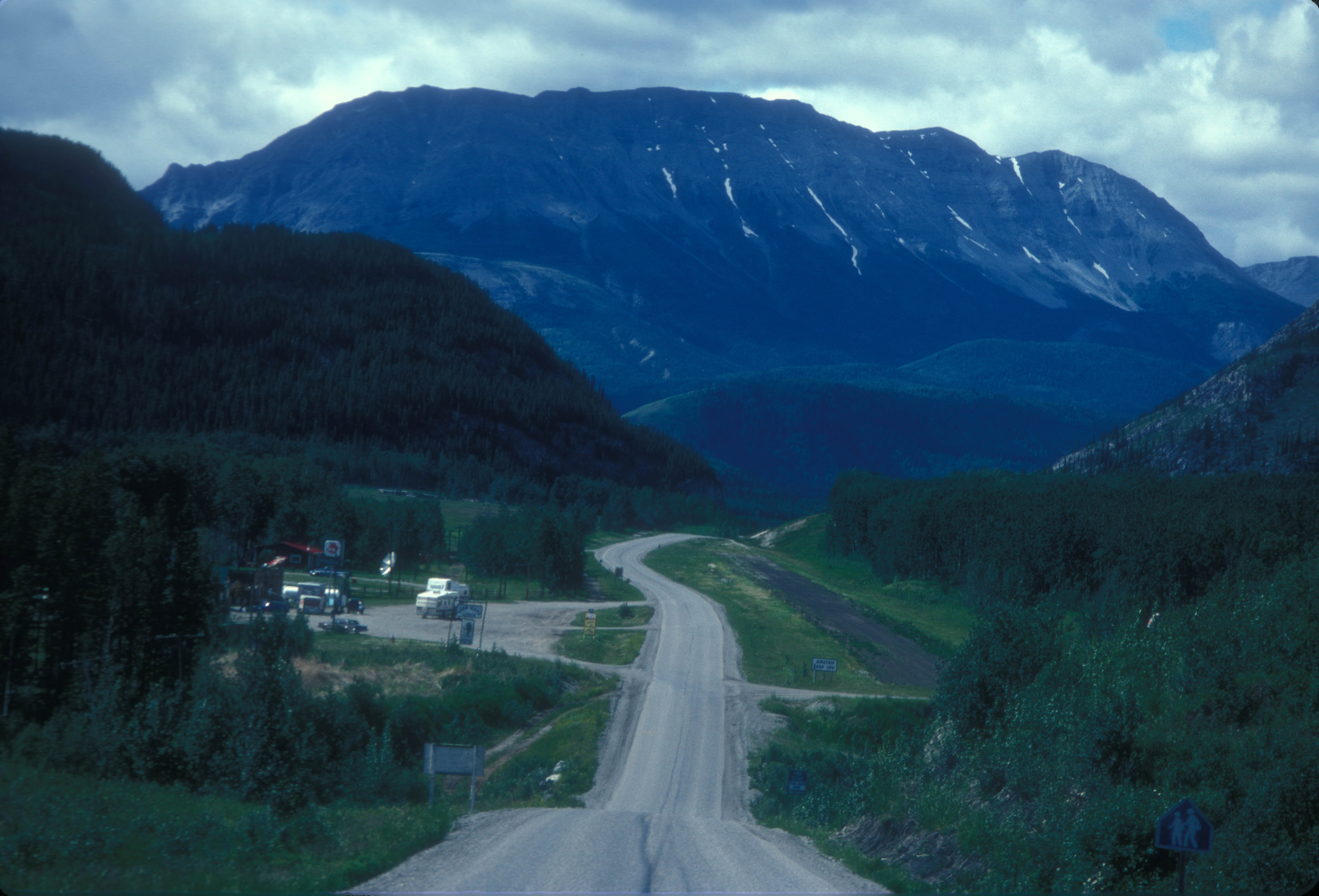

- Location of Toad River in British Columbia
- Coordinates: 58°51′00″N 125°14′00″W
- Country: Canada
- Province: British Columbia
- Area codes: 250, 778

Toad River, originally Toad's River Post, is a highway service community in northern British Columbia, Canada, located at historic Mile 422 on Highway 97, the Alaska Highway, near the confluence of the Toad and Racing Rivers. The community primarily serves travelers and tourists with a highway maintenance station; a lodge with a restaurant, campground and gas station; Other services includes a community hall, post office, fire station, a public telephone and a private 3000 foot airstrip. The Toad River Lodge boasts a "world famous" collection of over 10,000 hats (2016) thumbtacked to the ceiling, many of them donated by passersby on the Alaska Highway. Two miles north, The Poplars Campground offers camping, and motel rooms during the summer months (2011).

== Name ==
The community name derives from the nearby river of the same name that lies close to the Alaska Highway a few miles past the airstrip. The name derives historically from Hudson's Bay Company employees using the Liard River to reach the Northern Interior of British Columbia. It is likely a name given by Robert Campbell on his trips up river to Fort Halkett and Dease Lake during the 1830s. A Hudson's Bay trading post was established here in 1867, with a postmaster in service from 1868 to 1878, but the site was reported abandoned by the Geological Survey of Canada in 1890.

The name was well established by the time R.G. McConnell of the Canadian Geological Survey passed the mouth of Toad River entering the Liard River in 1887. He wrote "and Toad River, which comes in from the south through a deep gloomy valley four miles farther down (from the Crow River mentioned previously in the text). Two miles below Toad River, on the opposite side, is situated Toad River post, which was abandoned when the post on the Nelson was established." (ref. Geological and Natural History Survey of Canada, Annual Report 1888–89, report by R.G. McConnell, 1891, pages 40D-41D)

The river has its origin in a series of lakes which lie to the south of the Alaska Highway near historic Mile 446. The Toad River canyon between the community and the Liard River is a nasty piece of water even for jet boats with experienced pilots (private communication with D.Coulson, 2007). Much closer to the community lies Toad River Hot Springs Provincial Park.

== Schools ==
There is a public school in Toad River serving, as of May 2016, 10 students in grades 2 through 9, staffed by one teacher, an educational assistant, a secretary based in Fort Nelson and a circuit riding principal.
