= Frances Lake =

Lake in Yukon, Canada

- Location within Yukon
- Location: Yukon
- Coordinates: 61°20′22″N 129°34′21″W
- Basin countries: Canada
- Surface area: 9,941 ha (24,560 acres)
- Average depth: 31 m (102 ft)
- Max. depth: 93 m (305 ft)
- Surface elevation: 734 m (2,408 ft)

Frances Lake is a lake of Yukon, Canada. With an area of 9,941 hectares (24,560 acres; 38.38 sq mi) it is the largest lake in southeast Yukon and the largest in territory that does not flow into the Yukon River, instead draining to the Frances River and then the Beaufort Sea via the Liard and Mackenzie rivers. The lake lies at an elevation of 734 m (2,408 ft) has an average depth of 31 m (102 ft) and a maximum depth of 93 m (305 ft).

Several rivers and creeks flow into Frances Lake, forming extensive deltas. The lake and surrounding area was featured in Anton Money's 1975 autobiographical book This Was the North and one of the creeks is named Money Creek after this early settler to the area.

== Climate ==
Hour Lake, at an altitude of 890 m (2,920 ft), is a weather station located approximately 10 km (6.2 mi) to the south of Frances Lake. The region, typically for the Yukon, has a subarctic climate (Köppen Dfc) characterised by short, mild summers and long, frigid winters, although there is much greater precipitation and snowfall than more northerly parts of the Territory due to being closer to Pacific Ocean moisture.

Climate data for Hour Lake, Yukon (altitude 890 m (2,920 ft)), 1994-2013, extremes 1982-2014
Month	Jan	Feb	Mar	Apr	May	Jun	Jul	Aug	Sep	Oct	Nov	Dec	Year
Record high °C (°F)	11 (52)	10 (50)	15 (59)	19 (67)	31 (88)	33 (91)	33 (91)	33 (91)	24 (75)	18 (64)	9 (49)	8 (46)	33 (91)
Mean maximum °C (°F)	−1.8 (28.7)	1.4 (34.5)	6.4 (43.6)	14.2 (57.5)	21.9 (71.4)	27.3 (81.2)	27.7 (81.9)	26.4 (79.5)	18.1 (64.6)	10.8 (51.4)	1.4 (34.5)	−0.7 (30.8)	29.2 (84.6)
Mean daily maximum °C (°F)	−15.1 (4.9)	−9.1 (15.6)	−3.1 (26.4)	5.7 (42.3)	13.0 (55.4)	19.3 (66.8)	20.8 (69.4)	18.3 (65.0)	11.7 (53.1)	2.4 (36.4)	−9.5 (14.9)	−13.2 (8.3)	3.4 (38.2)
Daily mean °C (°F)	−20.2 (−4.4)	−15.7 (3.8)	−11.3 (11.7)	−1.8 (28.7)	5.9 (42.6)	11.9 (53.4)	13.6 (56.4)	11.5 (52.7)	6.2 (43.2)	−1.6 (29.2)	−14.2 (6.4)	−18.4 (−1.1)	−2.8 (26.9)
Mean daily minimum °C (°F)	−27.1 (−16.7)	−22.3 (−8.2)	−19.4 (−2.9)	−9.4 (15.1)	−1.3 (29.7)	4.4 (40.0)	6.4 (43.5)	4.6 (40.3)	0.8 (33.4)	−5.5 (22.1)	−19.0 (−2.2)	−24.1 (−11.4)	−9.3 (15.2)
Mean minimum °C (°F)	−45.0 (−49.0)	−38.4 (−37.2)	−36.8 (−34.3)	−24.3 (−11.8)	−9.0 (15.8)	−2.1 (28.2)	0.6 (33.0)	−2.1 (28.3)	−6.9 (19.5)	−19.7 (−3.4)	−33.9 (−29.1)	−39.5 (−39.1)	−46.7 (−52.0)
Record low °C (°F)	−51 (−60)	−48 (−54)	−45 (−49)	−35 (−31)	−22 (−8)	−4 (24)	−2 (28)	−4 (24)	−20 (−4)	−36 (−33)	−47 (−53)	−50 (−58)	−51 (−60)
Average precipitation mm (inches)	40 (1.59)	29 (1.14)	28 (1.12)	21 (0.81)	35 (1.39)	59 (2.34)	67 (2.64)	67 (2.62)	55 (2.15)	40 (1.59)	46 (1.83)	47 (1.85)	534 (21.07)
Average snowfall cm (inches)	40 (15.6)	29 (11.4)	28 (11.2)	14 (5.6)	7.1 (2.8)	0.0 (0.0)	0.0 (0.0)	0.0 (0.0)	3.0 (1.2)	28 (11.2)	45 (17.6)	45 (17.7)	239.1 (94.3)
Source: XMACIS2 (normals, extremes & precip/snow)

== See also ==
- List of lakes in Yukon
