= Muskwa-Kechika Management Area =

Provincially run tract of land in British Columbia, Canada

The Muskwa-Kechika Management Area (M-K or M-KMA) is a provincially-run tract of land in the far north of British Columbia. It has an advisory board that counsels the government on land-use decisions. Established by provincial government legislation in 1998, the area is meant to be preserved as a wild area, but development is not outright forbidden; the land is divided into different zones, with varying levels of protection, although the whole area is to be used according to an overall plan. The original concept called for 25% of the land to be turned into provincial parks, 60% to become "special management zones" (where limited mining and oil/gas drilling would be permitted), and 15% to become "special wild land zones", where logging would be prohibited. The original size of the M-KMA was 4,450,000 hectares (11,000,000 acres). However, in 2000, with the approval of the Mackenzie Land and Resource Management Plan (LRMP), over 1,900,000 hectares (4,700,000 acres) were added to the M-KMA for a total area of 6,400,000 hectares (16,000,000 acres)—an area slightly smaller than the US state of Maine, or the entire island of Ireland, or seven times the size of Yellowstone National Park, in Wyoming.

== Name and geography ==
The area is named after the Muskwa River and Muskwa Ranges (from the Cree: maskwa, "bear") and the Kechika River and Kechika Ranges (Kechika means "long inclining river"). The area include the Northern Rocky Mountains to the north of Lake Williston and the Rocky Mountain Foothills north of the Peace River and much of the southeastern Cassiar Mountains and a small portion of the northeastern Omineca Mountains. With the southern Selwyn and Mackenzie Mountains north of the Liard River, the area defines the Boreal Cordillera Ecozone.

== Parks and protected areas ==
(with area)

- Dall River Old Growth Provincial Park 644 hectares (1,590 acres)
- Denetiah Provincial Park & Protected Area 97,908 hectares (241,940 acres)
- Dune Za Keyih Provincial Park & Protected Area 347,789 hectares (859,410 acres)
- Finlay-Russel Provincial Park & Protected Area 122,795 hectares (303,430 acres)
- Graham-Laurier Provincial Park 99,982 hectares (247,060 acres)
- Horneline Creek Provincial Park 298 hectares (740 acres)
- Kwadacha Wilderness Provincial Park 114,444 hectares (282,800 acres)
- Liard River Corridor/West Provincial Parks & Protected Area 88,898 hectares (219,670 acres)
- Liard River Hot Springs Provincial Park 1,082 hectares (2,670 acres)
- Muncho Lake Provincial Park 86,079 hectares (212,710 acres)
- Northern Rocky Mountains Provincial Park & Protected Area 665,709 hectares (1,645,000 acres)
- Ospika-Cones Ecological Reserve 1,282 hectares (3,170 acres)
- Prophet River Hot Springs Provincial Park 185 hectares (460 acres)
- Redfern-Keily Provincial Park 80,771 hectares (199,590 acres)
- Sikanni Chief River Ecological Reserve 2,091 hectares (5,170 acres)
- Stone Mountain Provincial Park 25,179 hectares (62,220 acres)
- Toad River Hotsprings Provincial Park 414 hectares (1,020 acres)
