= Finlay-Russel Provincial Park and Protected Area =

Provincial park in British Columbia, Canada

- IUCN category II (national park)
- Location within British Columbia
- Interactive map of Finlay-Russel Provincial Park and Protected Area
- Location: Peace River RD, British Columbia, Canada
- Coordinates: 57°32′59″N 126°11′59″W
- Area: 109,205 ha (421.64 sq mi)
- Established: April 4, 2001
- Governing body: BC Parks

Finlay-Russel Provincial Park and Protected Area is a provincial park in British Columbia, Canada. It is part of the larger Muskwa-Kechika Management Area. The park is a 85-km corridor that goes along the Finlay River, stretching between the Fox River confluence and the Toodoggone River confluence. The closest community is Mackenzie, but it is a day's drive away from the park.

Finlay-Russel is near Stone Mountain Provincial Park, which is slightly more accessible. Finlay-Russel is rather remote, and the trails that are there are not reliably maintained.

== Protected Area ==
In the protected area, cycling and hunting are allowed, along with wilderness camping. Those who are cycling cannot use e-bikes off the designated roads unless using specifically authorized trail maintenance bikes.
