= Liard River, British Columbia =

Liard River
- Location of Liard River in British Columbia
- Coordinates: 59°24′57″N 126°05′42″W
- Country: Canada
- Province: British Columbia
- Area codes: 250, 778

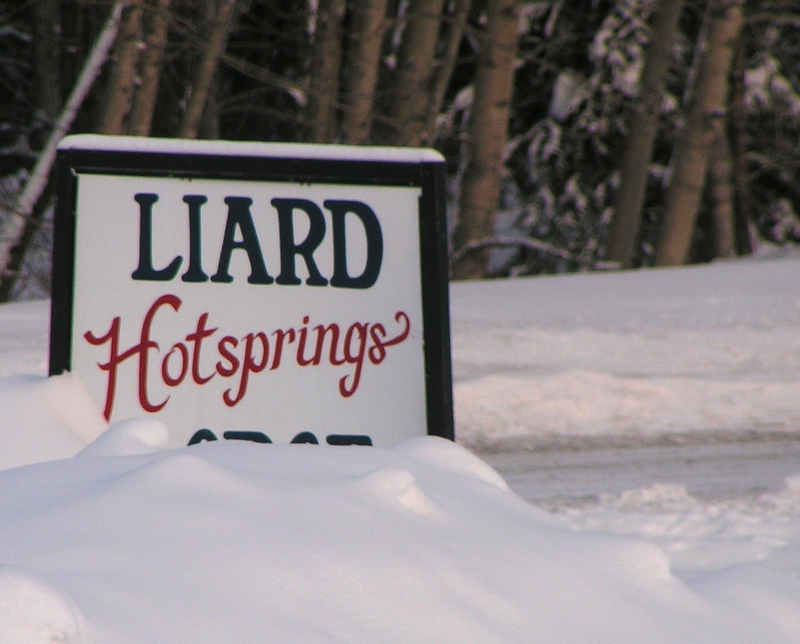
Welcome sign on the Alaska Highway

Liard River is a small community in northern British Columbia, Canada. It has a population of about 100 people. It is located at Kilometre 799 (Mile 496) of the Alaska Highway, near the border of British Columbia and the Yukon Territory.

== History ==
Liard River received its name from the Liard River, the large river on whose banks the town is located.

== Geography ==
The community lies at an elevation of 460 meters (1,510 ft), between the Terminal Range of the Muskwa Ranges (to the south), and Mount Ole of the Liard Plateau (to the north), immediately north of the Liard River Suspension Bridge on the Alaska Highway.

The Liard River area is home to Liard River Hot Springs Provincial Park. The hot springs have been used by humans for several thousand years as documented by oral tradition of the Peace Liard Indian tribes, native to the region. The hot springs have a water temperatures ranging from 42 °C to 52 °C; and is called the Alpha pool. The change building and deck was refurbished in 2013 with multiple access points and a new toilet building being added. The boardwalk, which leads to the hot spring pools, passes 700m through a warm water swamp and boreal forest which supports rich and diverse plant communities as well as mammal and bird species. Moose can be seen feeding in the warm water swamps. Due to the lush plant life influenced by the warmth of the springs, the area used to be known as the "Tropical Valley".
