= Liard River Corridor Provincial Park and Protected Area =

Provincial park in British Columbia, Canada

- IUCN category II (national park)
- Location within British Columbia
- Interactive map of Liard River Corridor Provincial Park and Protected Area
- Location: Northern Rockies RM, British Columbia, Canada
- Coordinates: 59°18′N 125°12′W
- Area: 179,710 ha (693.9 sq mi)
- Established: January 25, 2001
- Governing body: BC Parks

Liard River Corridor Provincial Park and Protected Area is a provincial park in British Columbia, Canada. Part of the park is in the larger Muskwa-Kechika Management Area. It was designated a park in January 2001.

== Location ==
Liard River Park is adjacent to the famed Liard River Hot Springs, which are also within their own provincial park. The park is located among the northernly area of the Rockies, with the Alaska Highway providing road access. The largest human settlement is Fort Nelson, found 317 kilometers southeast.
