= Stone Mountain Provincial Park =

Provincial park in British Columbia, Canada

- IUCN category Ib (wilderness area)
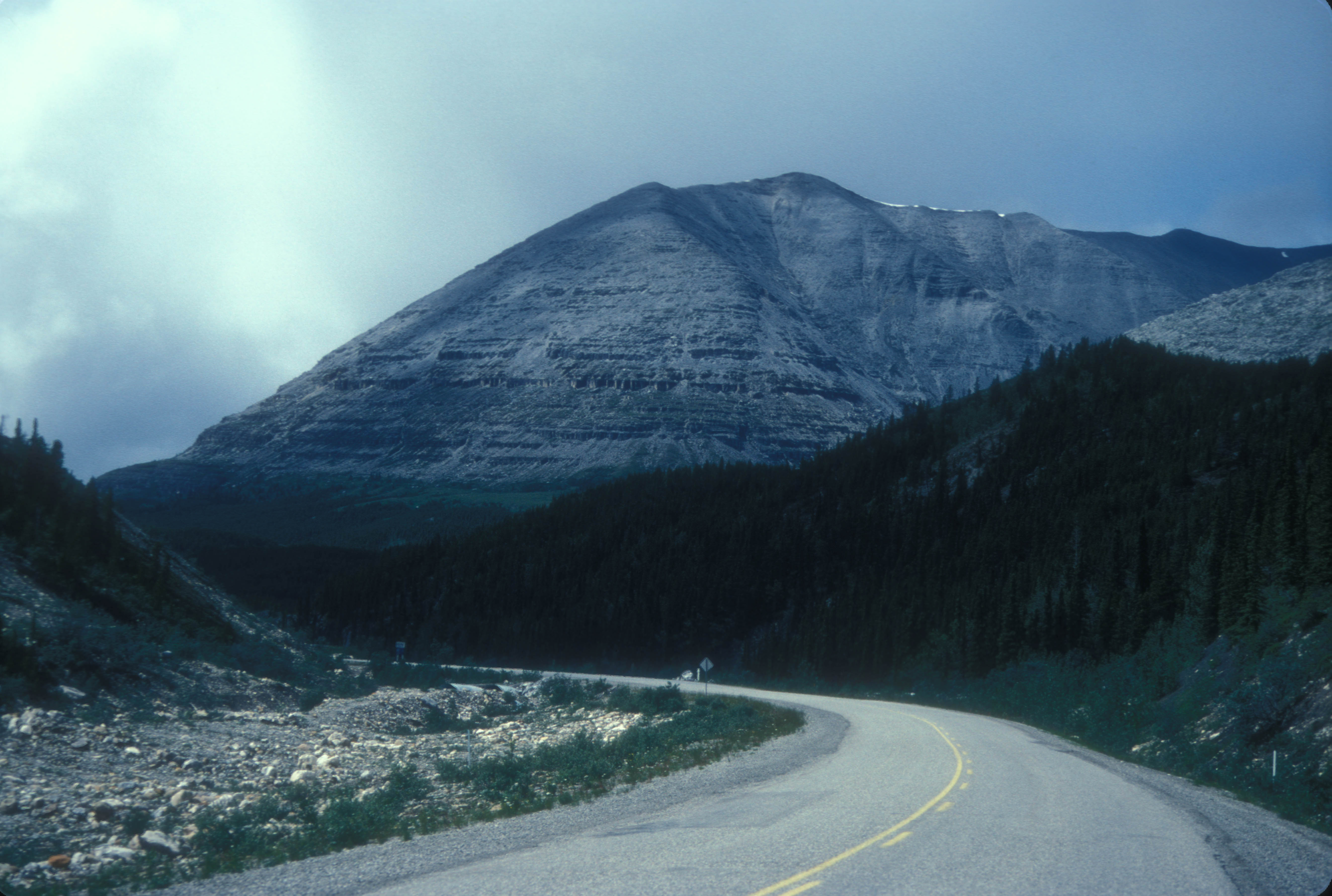
- The Alaska Highway in Stone Mountain Provincial Park

- Location within British Columbia
- Interactive map of Stone Mountain Provincial Park
- Location: Northern Rockies RM, British Columbia, Canada
- Nearest city: Fort Nelson, British Columbia
- Coordinates: 58°35′N 124°45′W
- Area: 25,690 ha (99.2 sq mi)
- Established: June 26, 1957
- Governing body: BC Parks
- Website: Stone Mountain Provincial Park

The Stone Mountain Provincial Park is an area of 256.91 square kilometres (99.19 sq mi) of mountain wilderness in the Canadian province of British Columbia. The park is part of the larger Muskwa-Kechika Management Area, which includes the Northern Rocky Mountains Provincial Park, located immediately south, and Kwadacha Wilderness Provincial Park.

It and nearby Muncho Lake Provincial Park are accessed from the Alaska Highway, where it penetrates the Northern Rocky Mountains. The park has various campsites, hiking and backpacking trails, a day-use picnic area, and a boat launch available for use.

== Geography ==
Stone Mountain Provincial Park is best known for its mountains, as that is how it got its name. Since the park is in the alpine tundra biogeoclimatic zone, there is a lack of trees and an abundance of solid mountains going skywards.

The park has steep topography, as elevations range from 1,200 meters to 2,500 meters and above. The tallest mountain in the park is St. Magnus at 2,550 meters. There are also rivers, lakes, and flowering meadows inside of the park as well.

== Flora ==
Stone Mountain Park has two bio-geoclimatic zones that it supports: the subalpine zone and the alpine tundra zone. Due to a short growing season and severe weather, the plants in the park are often fragile.

== Facilities ==
The park offers 28 vehicle campsites, sites available for day-use, a picnic area, and a boat launch. Stone Mountain Park has a large trail variety, with the most popular destination within the park being Summit Lake. The hiking trails in the park are all sorts of difficulty, as some can be done within a day while others can take multiple.
