= Frances River (Yukon) =

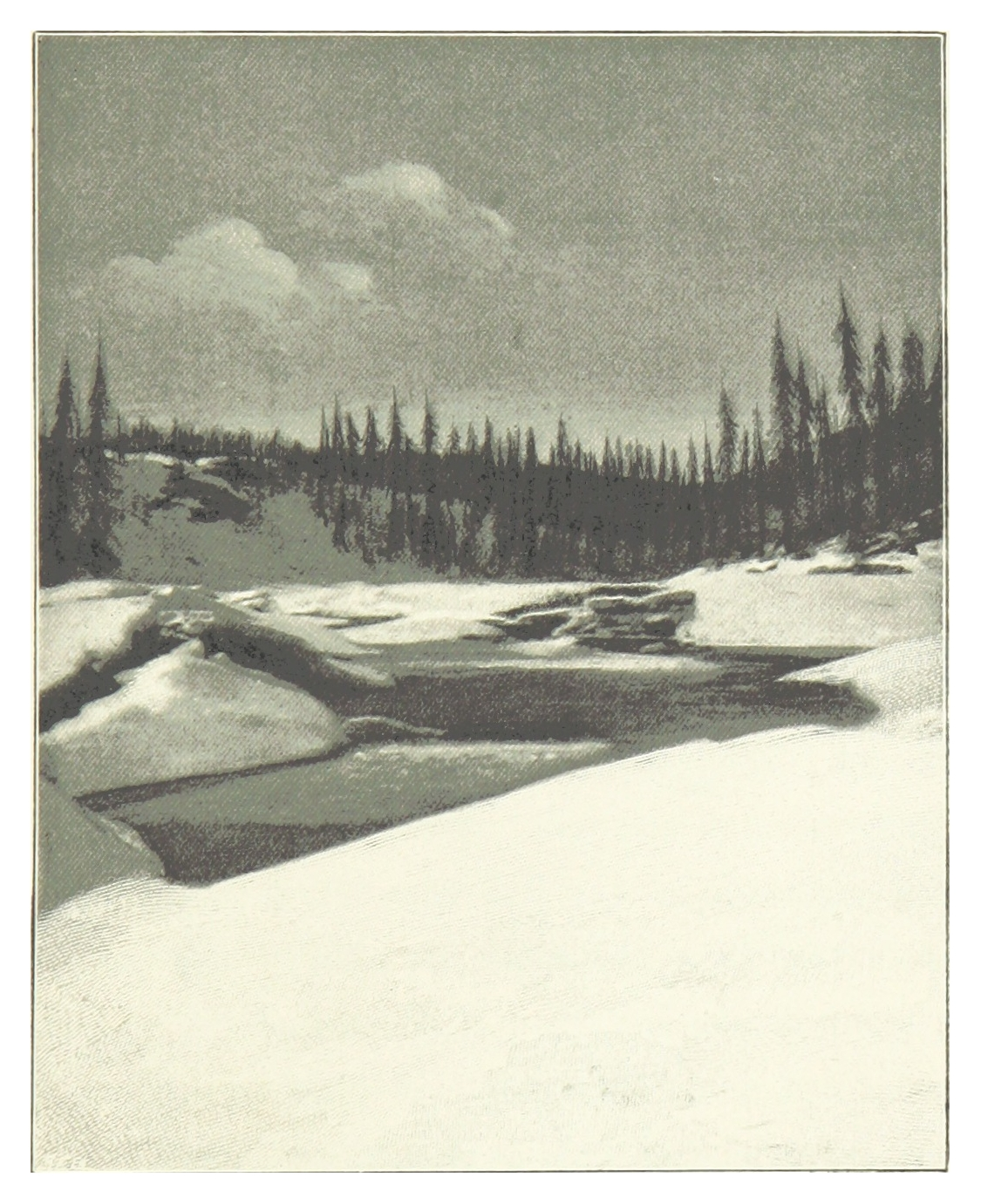

Location
- Country: Canada
- Territory: Yukon

Physical characteristics
- Source
  - location: Frances Lake
  - coordinates: 61°13′29″N 129°16′59″W
  - elevation: 740 meters (2,430 ft)
- Mouth
  - location: Liard River
  - coordinates: 60°16′2″N 129°10′56″W
- Length: 140 km (87 mi)

The Frances River is a left tributary of the Liard River in southern Yukon.

The Frances River forms the drain of Frances Lake. Flowing south, it passes Tuchitua, where the Nahanni Range Road branches off from the Yukon Highway 4 (Robert Campbell Highway). The Yukon Highway 4 runs parallel to the river for a while before it crosses the river about 25 km (16 mi) from the mouth and continues to Watson Lake. The Frances River flows into the Liard River 25 km (16 mi) northwest of Watson Lake. The river valley of the Frances River separates the Selwyn Mountains to the east from the Pelly Mountains to the west.

The Frances River has a length of about 140 km (87 mi). At the level at the highway bridge, the mean discharge is 157 m^{3}/s (5,500 cu ft/s). At this point the catchment area covers an area of 12,800 km^{2} (4,900 sq mi).

== See also ==
- List of rivers of Yukon
