= Kwadacha Wilderness Provincial Park =

Provincial park in British Columbia, Canada

- IUCN category Ib (wilderness area)
- Location within British Columbia
- Interactive map of Kwadacha Wilderness Provincial Park
- Location: Peace River RD, British Columbia, Canada
- Coordinates: 57°48′N 125°7′W
- Area: 130,279 ha (503.01 sq mi)
- Established: May 18, 1973
- Governing body: BC Parks

Kwadacha Wilderness Provincial Park is a provincial park in British Columbia, Canada. It is part of the larger Muskwa-Kechika Management Area, which include to the north of the Kwadacha the Northern Rocky Mountains Provincial Park and Stone Mountain Provincial Park. The park covers 130,279 ha of wilderness, with most of that being mountainous.

Kwadacha Park has 70+ bird species, along with bears, wolves, and Siberian lemmings.

== Accessibility ==
It is approximately 160 km (100 mi) southwest of Fort Nelson, and there is no road access. The standard way to access the park is through horseback or by aircraft. It is about 150 km (90 mi) of backpacking to reach the park from Alaska Highway, and there are many treacherous river crossings. It is advised that backpackers plan for 12 to 14 days of backpacking for safety.

== Recreation ==
The park is open year round to anyone who manages to get there. Wilderness, backcountry, or walk-in camping are allowed, but there are no facilities provided.
