= Graham-Laurier Provincial Park =

Provincial park in British Columbia, Canada

- IUCN category II (national park)
- Location within British Columbia
- Interactive map of Graham-Laurier Provincial Park
- Location: Peace River RD, British Columbia, Canada
- Coordinates: 56°38′N 123°30′W
- Area: 99,982 ha (386.03 sq mi)
- Established: June 29, 1999
- Governing body: BC Parks

Graham-Laurier Provincial Park is a provincial park in British Columbia, Canada. It is part of the larger Muskwa-Kechika Management Area. The main recreation activity in the park is hunting. The park is a remote wilderness area located approximately 145 km northwest of Fort St. John. The main attraction at the park is Christina Falls, which can be accessed by the Christina Falls trail. Only ATVs and non-motorized users can use the 22-km long route, but there are other non-motorized routes throughout the park.

== Access ==
There is motorized access to Grahm-Laurier Park through the Halfway/Graham Forest Service Road that provides an entrance for motorized visitors in the southeast corner of the park.

== See also ==
- List of British Columbia Provincial Parks
