= Peace River-Liard Regional District =

Division of British Columbia, Canada (1967–1999)

Coordinates: 56°40′00″N 122°45′00″W

Peace River-Liard Regional District was a regional district in northeastern British Columbia, spanning from Tumbler Ridge in the southwest to Lower Post on the northwest, in the angle of British Columbia's borders with Yukon, the Northwest Territories and Alberta. It was created on October 31, 1967, and split into Fort Nelson-Liard Regional District and the Peace River Regional District on October 31, 1987. The Fort Nelson-Liard Regional District was renamed the Northern Rockies Regional District, then made into the Northern Rockies Regional Municipality on May 26, 1999.

== See also ==
- List of regional districts of British Columbia
