= Hyland River Provincial Park =

Provincial park in British Columbia, Canada

- IUCN category II (national park)
- Location within British Columbia
- Interactive map of Hyland River Provincial Park
- Location: Cassiar Land District, British Columbia, Canada
- Nearest city: Lower Post, BC
- Coordinates: 59°57′44″N 128°08′45″W
- Area: 34 ha (84 acres)
- Established: March 20, 1964
- Governing body: BC Parks

Hyland River Provincial Park is a provincial park in British Columbia, Canada, located near the boundary with Yukon along the Alaska Highway just east of the community of Lower Post and north of the Liard River. Established in 1964, the park is 34 ha. in area.
