= Coal River (Canada) =

River in Canada

Coordinates: 59.68623°N 126.93812°W

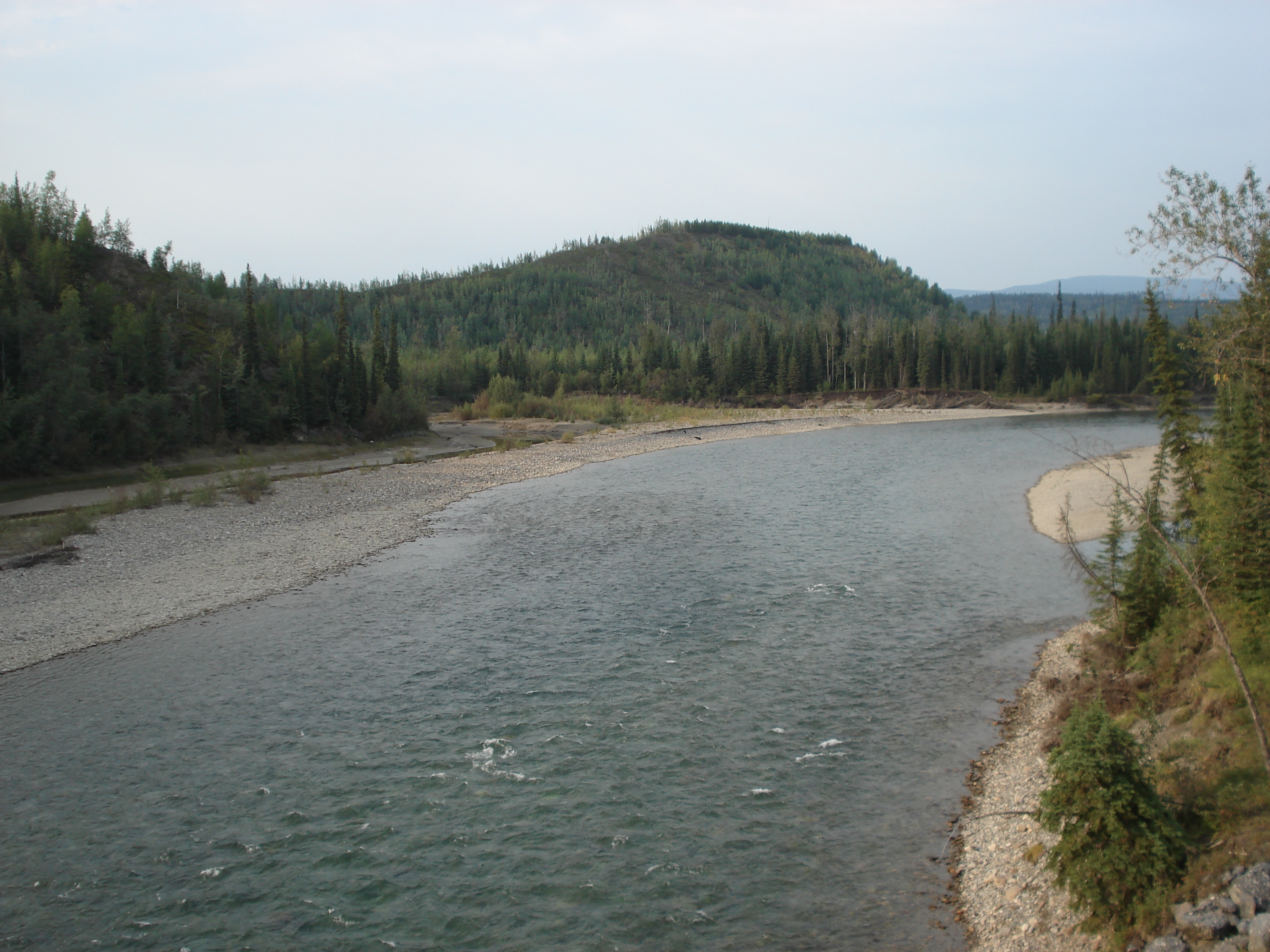
Coal River in August 2010 as seen from Highway 97 near Cranberry Rapids

The Coal River runs from southern Yukon, Canada, into northern British Columbia, Canada, where it flows into the Liard River at historic milepost 533 of the Alaska Highway (Highway 97). It was originally named Charles River in 1831, after John Charles of the Hudson's Bay Company. When Canadian explorer-geologist Richard George McConnell visited the river in 1887, he noted deposits of low grade lignite that had been brought down by the river.

This river hosts a series of class 5 and 6 rapids, but the start of the river is not accessible by road—only the bottom end can be reached by an automobile. Where the Coal River runs into the Liard river stands the Coal River Lodge, which contains an RV park, motel, cafe, gas station, 370-metre (1,200 ft) airstrip, and gift shop. The "community" of Coal River has a winter population of 2, and in the summer swells to 5 or 6 when the lodge is open.

== See also ==
- List of rivers of British Columbia
- List of rivers of Yukon
