= Sentinel Range (Canada) =

Mountain range in British Columbia, Canada

- Location within British Columbia

Dimensions
- Length: 76 km (47 mi) N-S
- Width: 78 km (48 mi) E-W

Geography
- Country: Canada
- Province: British Columbia
- Range coordinates: 59°00′00″N 125°39′00″W
- Parent range: Canadian Rockies
- Borders on: Terminal Range

The Sentinel Range is one of the northernmost sub-ranges of the Canadian Rockies, lying between Muncho Lake (SW) and the Liard River (N). The northernmost is the Terminal Range, so named for its position at the terminus of the Rockies, and lies to its west.

== See also ==
- Muncho Lake Provincial Park
- Stone Mountain Provincial Park
- Northern Rockies
- Muskwa Ranges
- Muncho Pass
