= Trout River (British Columbia) =

Tributary of the Liard River

- Location of Trout River in British Columbia

Location
- Country: Canada
- Province: British Columbia
- Regional district: Northern Rockies Regional Municipality

The Trout River is a tributary of the Liard River in far northern British Columbia, Canada, flowing northwest from headwaters at 58°44′N 126°14′W, near Muncho Lake, to meet the Liard at the community of Liard River. It is at the upper end of the Grand Canyon of the Liard, which is part of Liard River Corridor Provincial Park and Protected Area.
