= Toad River =

- Location of mouth

Location
- Country: Canada
- Province: British Columbia
- District: Peace River Land District

Physical characteristics
- Mouth
  - coordinates: 59°23′N 124°55′W

The Toad River is a river in the Canadian boreal forest, within the borders of the province of British Columbia.

The Toad River was named for the numerous large toads seen along its banks by fur traders of the early 19th century. John McLeod of the Hudson's Bay Company, who traveled up the river in 1831, wrote: "it derives its appellation from the number of Toads seen along its banks and some are of immense size; I have seen some which weighed upwards of a pound, and the Indians inform me there are some to be seen of a much larger size."

The traditional indigenous name for the river is Tsal-eh-chesi.

== Course ==
The Toad River flows generally north and northeast, passing through Muncho Lake Provincial Park, to join the Liard River. The Liard River is a tributary of the Mackenzie River, which empties into the Arctic Ocean. The community of Toad River, British Columbia is located in the lower reaches of the river where it is crossed by the Alaska Highway, near the Liard.

Part of the river flows through the Muskwa-Kechika Management Area.

== See also ==
- List of rivers of British Columbia
- Toad River Hot Springs Provincial Park
