= Liard River Hot Springs Provincial Park =

Provincial park in British Columbia, Canada

- IUCN category III (natural monument or feature)
- Location within British Columbia
- Interactive map of Liard River Hot Springs Provincial Park
- Location: British Columbia, Canada
- Nearest city: Fort Nelson
- Coordinates: 59°25′22″N 126°05′48″W
- Area: 10.82 km^{2} (4.18 sq mi)
- Established: April 1957
- Governing body: BC Ministry of Environment, BC Parks

Liard River Hot Springs Provincial Park is a provincial park in British Columbia, Canada. It is home to the second largest natural hot springs in Canada, after Deer River Hot Springs 15 km to the northeast. It is a natural river of hot water rather than a spring-fed man-made pool. The park is part of the larger Muskwa-Kechika Management Area. The community of Liard River, British Columbia is located nearby at milepost 499.

== History ==
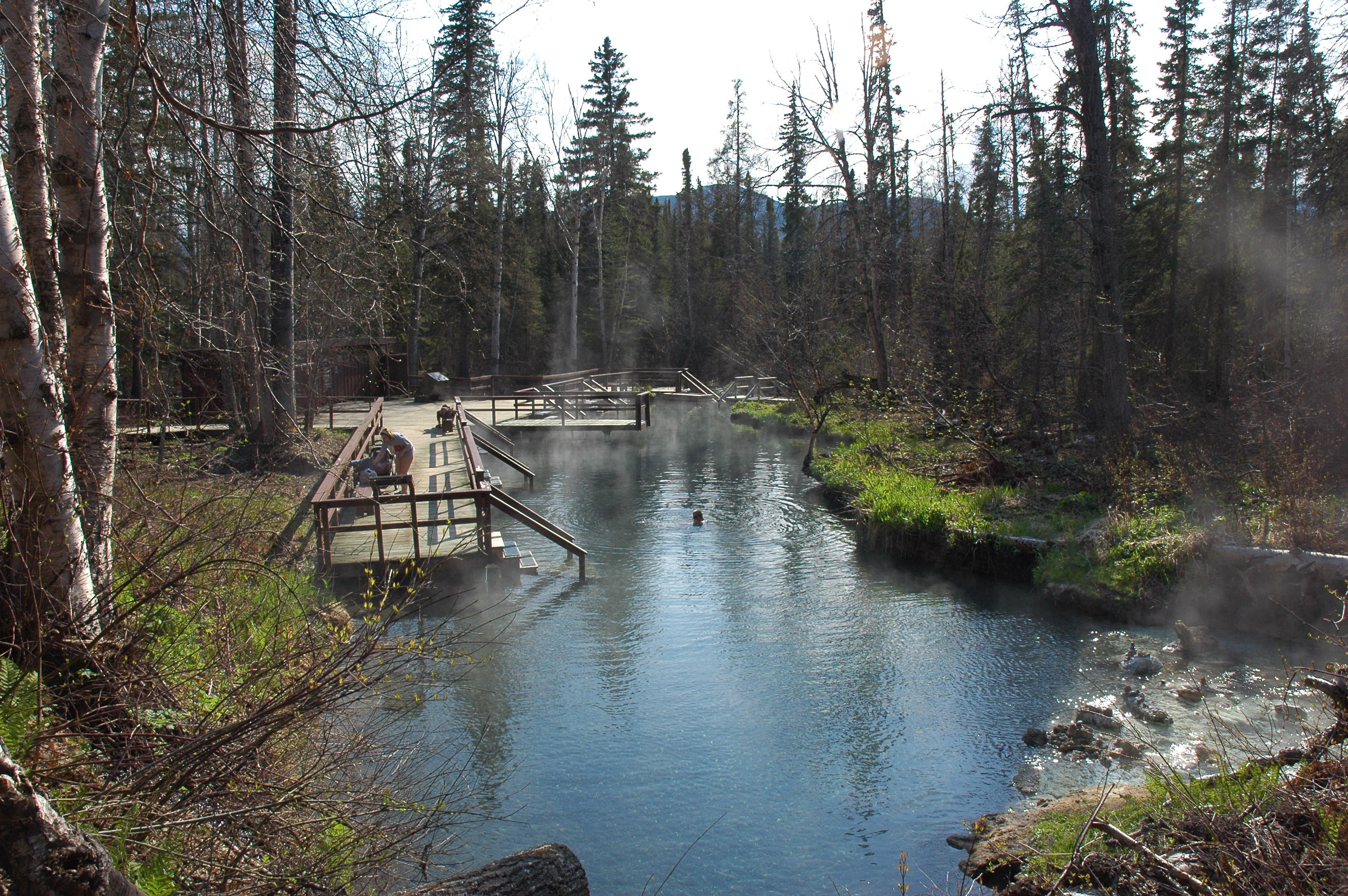
Alpha Pool

The Liard River Hot Springs Provincial Park was created in April 1957. The first boardwalk and pool facilities were built by the United States Army in 1942.

The Liard River Hot Springs proper are located at 59°25′40″N 126°06′15″W. They were originally named the Theresa Hot Springs.

== Flora ==
The park contains a warm water swamp and boreal forest which supports rich and diverse plant communities, as well as mammal and bird species.

== Fauna ==
Watch for moose feeding in the warm water swamps. Bears, as well, are a common hazard in summer months, and may be feeding only 10 ft (3.0 m) away from bathers.

Due to the lush plant life (including 14 species of orchids) influenced by the warmth of the springs, the area used to be known as the "Tropical Valley".

== Recreation ==
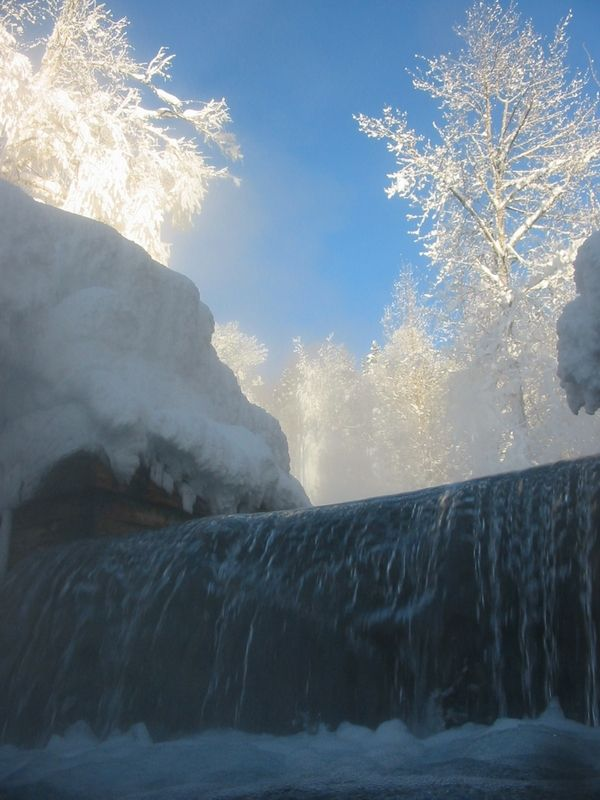
Waterfall from Alpha Pool

The alpha pool has water temperatures ranging from 42 to 52 °C (108 to 126 °F).

There are raised walkways from the parking area to the springs so that the delicate muskeg that forms the swamp is not disturbed. The walkway was the scene of a much-publicized black bear attack that killed two tourists on August 14, 1997.

=== Amenities ===
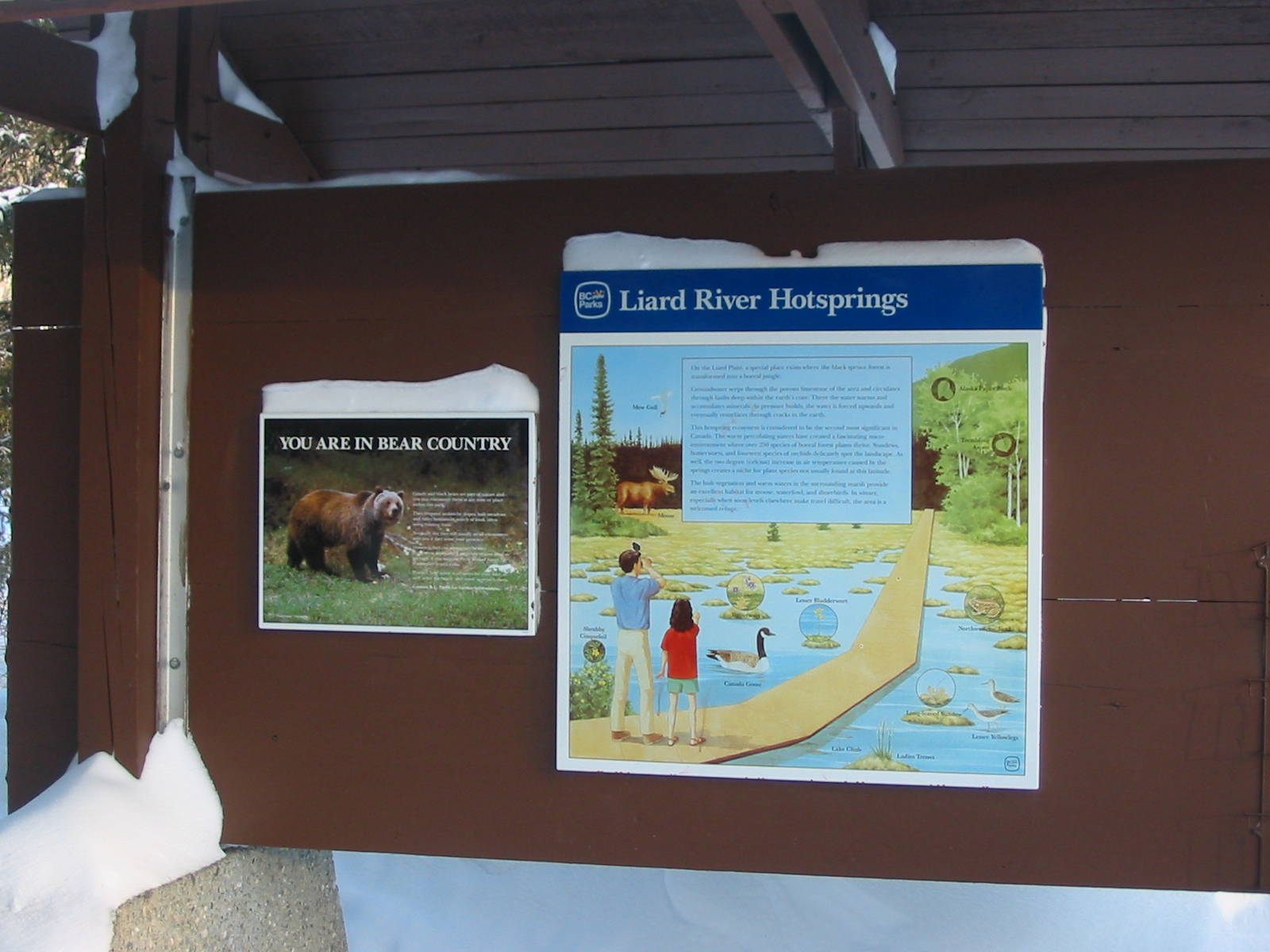
Information panel

Some of the amenities offered are:

- Bathing pools
- Change houses
- Wheelchair access
- Playground
- A 700-metre (2,300 ft) long wooden walkway leads from the parking lot to the hotsprings pool, crossing picturesque muskeg.

== Photo gallery ==
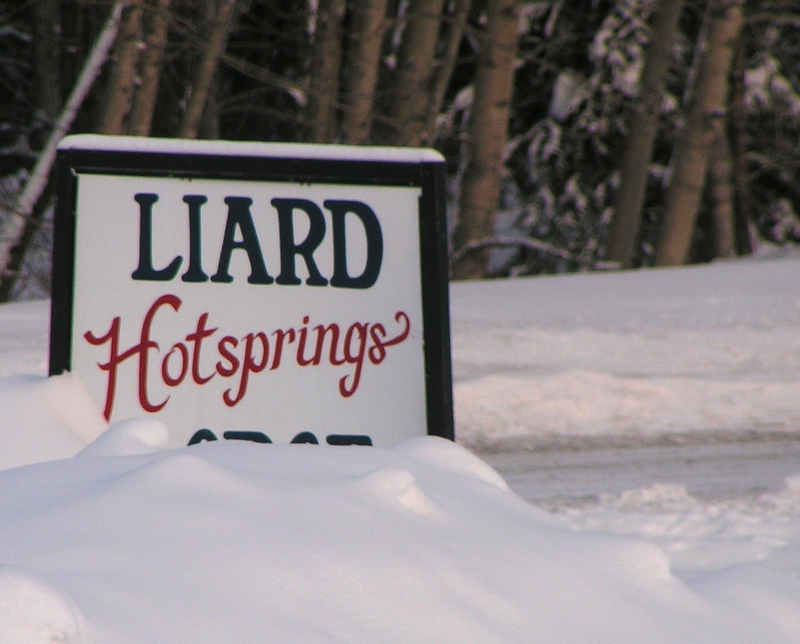

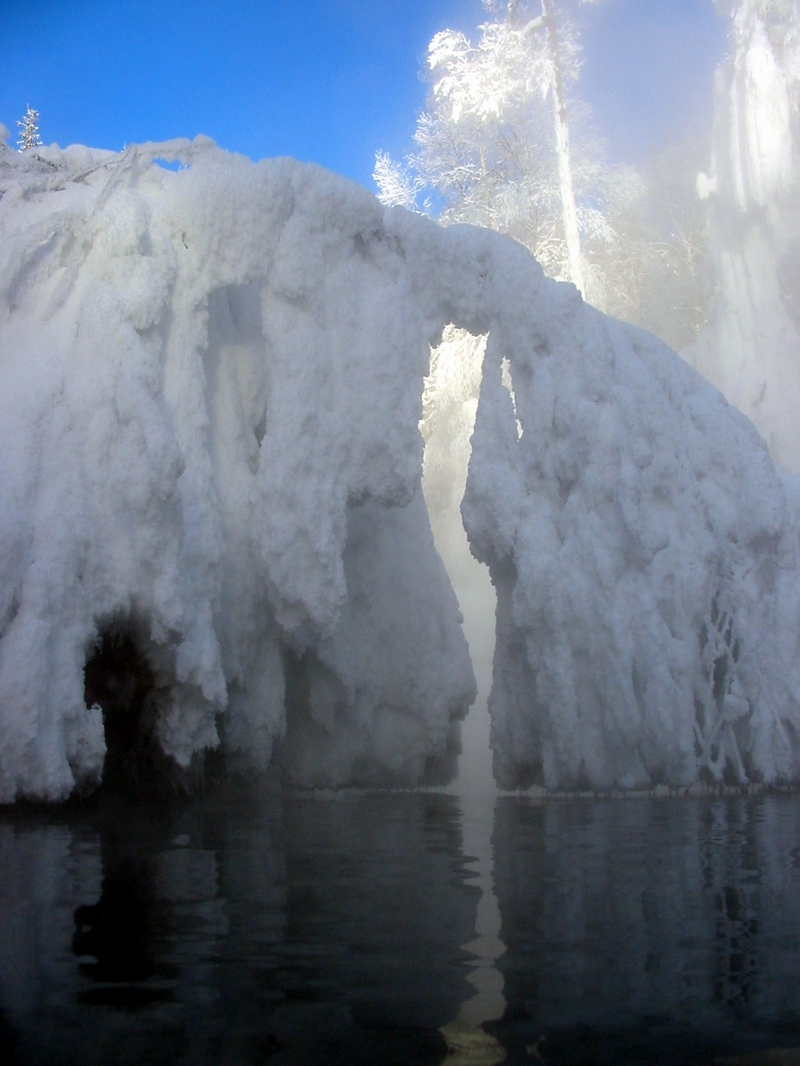

== See also ==
- List of British Columbia Provincial Parks
- List of Canadian provincial parks
- List of National Parks of Canada
- Muncho Lake Provincial Park
- Stone Mountain Provincial Park
- Toad River Hot Springs Provincial Park
