= Toad River Hot Springs Provincial Park =

Provincial park and thermal springs in British Columbia, Canada

- IUCN category II (national park)
- Location within British Columbia
- Interactive map of Toad River Hot Springs Provincial Park
- Location: British Columbia, Canada
- Nearest city: Fort Nelson
- Coordinates: 58°55′36″N 125°05′04″W
- Area: 4.23 km^{2} (1.63 sq mi)
- Established: June 28, 1999
- Governing body: BC Parks

Toad River Hot Springs Provincial Park is a provincial park in the north of British Columbia, Canada. The hot springs are located on the lefthand bank of the Toad River, outside of the Racing River outflow. Fort Nelson, Canada, is 160 km away. The area is rugged and remote, accessible only via hiking, riverboat, horseback, or helicopter. The park is part of the larger Muskwa-Kechika Management Area.

== Accessibility ==
Getting entrance into this area is very difficult, as the crossing of private property being a likely factor, unless accessed by boat or air. For those traveling on horseback or by hiking, it is best done so from the Stone Mountain Safaris parking lot.

== Hot springs ==
There is no actual bathing pool; visitors are advised to not attempt bathing, as heavy mud is a strong presence in the area. The chances of seeing wildlife is high though, as moose and other species use the mudflats as a mineral lick. The location of the main hot springs are about 1 km upstream from where the Toad and Racing Rivers join.

== Ecology ==
Toad River Hot Springs Park is located within the Muskwa Foothills ecosection, and it protects a significant ecosystem of hot springs. The floodplain often deals with fire, which allows for a mosaic-style variety in the shrubbery and other plants.
