= Fort Nelson, British Columbia =

Fort Nelson
- Nicknames: Mile 300, Fort Nelly, F-N
- Location of Fort Nelson in British Columbia Fort Nelson (Canada)
- Coordinates: 58°48′21.3″N 122°41′47.3″W
- Country: Canada
- Province: British Columbia
- Regional Municipality: Northern Rockies
- Incorporated: 1971
- Amalgamated: 2009

Government
  - Governing body: Northern Rockies Regional Council
  - MP: Bob Zimmer (Cons - Peace River)
  - MLA: Jordan Kealy (Ind - Peace River North)

Area (2021)
  - Total: 5.02 km^{2} (1.94 sq mi)
- Elevation: 410 m (1,350 ft)

Population (2021)
  - Total: 2,611
  - Density: 520.1/km^{2} (1,347/sq mi)
- Time zone: UTC−07:00 (MST)
- Postal code span: V0C
- Area code: 250 / 778 / 236
- Highways: Highway 97
- Website: Fort Nelson; Northern Rockies Regional Municipality

Fort Nelson is a community in northeast British Columbia, Canada, within the Northern Rockies Regional Municipality (NRRM). It held town status prior to 6 February 2009, when it amalgamated with the former Northern Rockies Regional District to form the NRRM, becoming its administrative centre. The NRRM is the first regional municipality in the province.

The community lies east of the northern Rocky Mountains in the Peace River region along the Alaska Highway at Mile 300. The town is approximately a four hour drive from the nearest urban centre, Fort St. John, but could potentially take six hours under winter driving conditions. The Alaska Highway both north and south of Fort Nelson is usually well plowed in the winter, and offers scenic views year-round.

According to the 2021 Canadian Census, the population was 2,611, a drop of 22.5% from the 2016 census.

== History ==
Fort Nelson, named in honour of the British naval hero Horatio Nelson, 1st Viscount Nelson, was established by the North West Company in 1805 as a fur-trading post. Due to fires, floods and feuds, Fort Nelson is in its fifth location.

=== World War II ===
Fort Nelson Airport was a valuable asset for allied military forces in World War II, as it served as an airbase for the United States Air Force and for the Royal Canadian Air Force. Contrary to popular belief that the construction of the Alaska Highway commenced in Dawson Creek, Fort Nelson was the original Mile 0 on the Alaska Highway because of the existence of a previously constructed road from Fort St. John to Fort Nelson. The United States Army built perhaps the most notable historical artifact in the area, the Alaska Highway. Construction began in 1942 out of a firm belief that Alaska faced a significant threat of Japanese invasion. Initial highway construction was performed by over 11,000 U.S. soldiers. After approximately nine months, the highway was finally completed, making Fort Nelson a bustling service-centre along the road. After the Japanese surrender of 1945, the U.S. Army ceded the Canadian portion of the highway to the Canadian government, which it made accessible to the public in 1948.

=== Post-World War II ===
In the early 1950s the first five acres were sold to locals, which marked the start of the community as a separate entity from the military. Oil and gas exploration in the early 1950s provided Fort Nelson with the industrial sector that it required to jump-start expansion of the community into what would eventually become the village of Fort Nelson in 1971. However, due to collapse in oil price in 2014, most gas fields and associated rigs have been shut down and put out of operation on an indefinite basis. After the completion of BC Hydro's natural gas power plant to provide electricity to the region, Fort Nelson experienced true growth. A railway was built by the Pacific Great Eastern Railway (BC Rail) up to Fort Nelson in 1971 which allowed efficient transportation of the local industry's major products (lumber, and gas) to larger markets in the south. The railway was left in abandoned state due to lack of use in the 2010s and was subsequently closed down. No facility has since been built to replace the railway to ship commodity to markets. Renewable energy company Peak Renewables is currently in negotiations with the provincial government and CN Rail to make improvements to the rail line as they develop their Pellet Plant in Fort Nelson.

=== Post-millennium ===
Fort Nelson held its first annual Northern Lights Festival in March 2019. The community welcomed hundreds of international visitors to experience the northern British Columbia lifestyle. The festival included dog sled races, trips to Liard Hot Springs, northern lights viewing, indigenous handgames and cultural celebrations, concerts from celebrated Canadian musicians, and many other events.

The closure of both forestry mills officially ended the major economic pillar in 2008, mainly due to the collapse in US housing prices and subprime mortgage crisis. The 2014 collapse in oil prices decimated the natural gas industry. Without oil production in the Horn River Basin and lack of pipeline access, many major oil companies, including Apache, Nexen and Encana, shut down their local production. With the bankruptcy of Endurance energy, many local workers were laid off. The Community Forest or boreal caribou protection initiative, with support of local First Nations and Mayor Gary Foster, impacted the potential logging quota and possible areas for new gas well development. The Community Forest would be 193,262 ha (477,560 acres) out of a total of 1,465,000 ha (3,620,000 acres).

Since 2012, lack of access to maternal care has deterred many young professionals from relocating to Fort Nelson for work. In 2019, outages in electrical power, telephone service and internet access in 2017 disrupted the municipality. Lack of basic infrastructure, including user-friendly facilities, have deterred many tourists from enjoying local attractions. On 26 March 2020, the shuttered Tackama mill was set on fire and suffered significant damage. Circumstances were suspicious and RCMP was called to investigate for any criminal element.

Due to the collapse of LNG price and the closure of the biggest private employer in the local region, Fort Nelson suffered an exodus of residents, including former business owners who cannot find jobs in their birthplace, and amongst the casualties of this economic downturn included the Fort Nelson dollar store. The owner of the Fort Nelson dollar store told CBC Daybreak North host Carolina de Ryk that '[she] just had no choice but to decide to close and try and make it out of here paying off people I owe money to.' The owner of the dollar store predicted that 'A lot of people are hurting. A lot of people are leaving Fort Nelson and leaving their houses, either renting them out or just downright giving them back to the banks.' Average house values dropped from 282,000 in 2014 to 103,000 in 2019. Over a 5-year period, the house price dropped by 63.4%.

On May 10, 2024, the entire town was evacuated as the result of a massive wildfire by nearby Parker Lake. The evacuation order was rescinded and residents were allowed to return on May 27. Due to the wildfire and a lack of a stable supply of gas, NorthRiver Midstream shut down their natural gas plant and laid off 42 unionized employees and six non-unionized employees.

== Geography ==
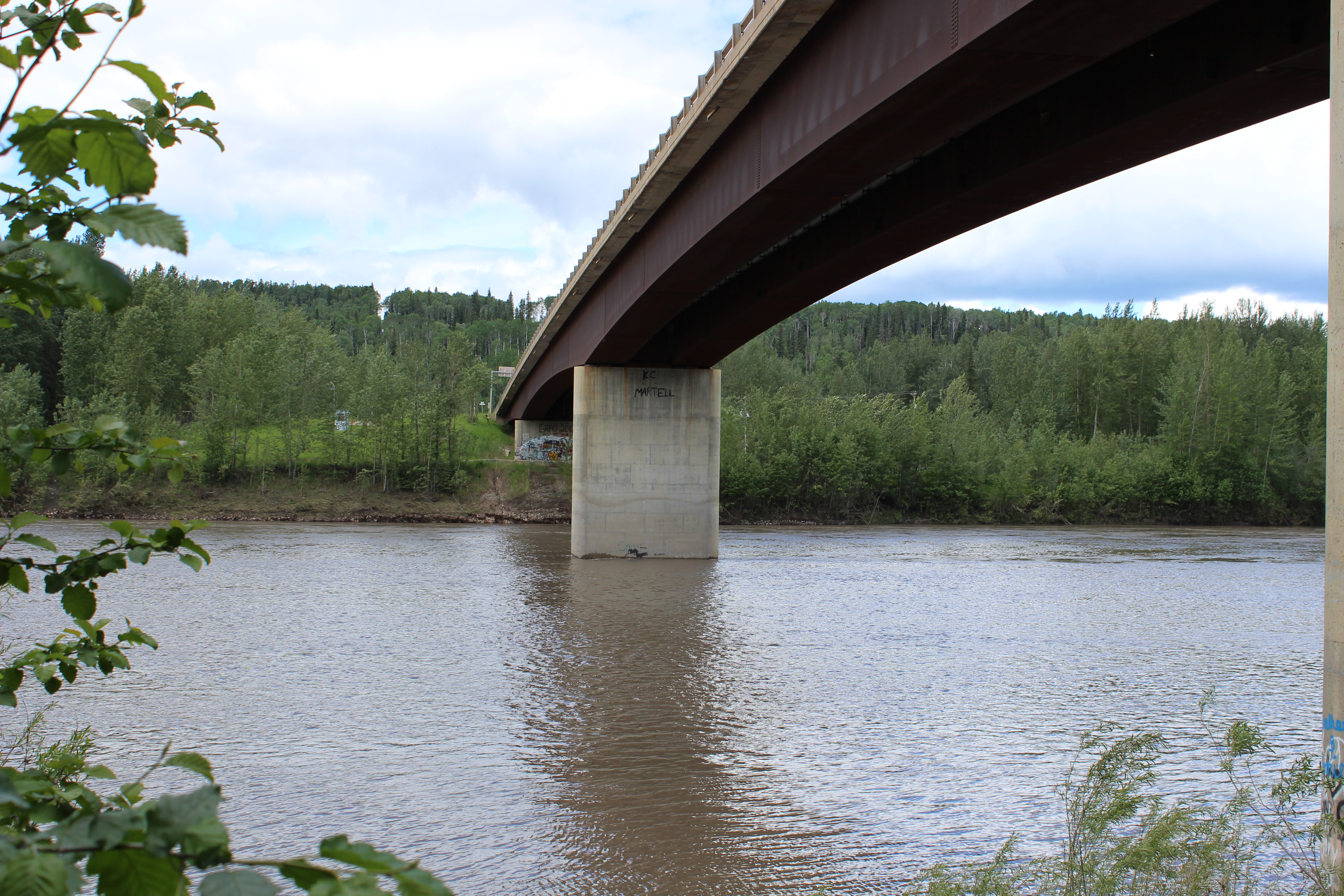
Muskwa River

Fort Nelson lies near the confluence of Fort Nelson River (which took the name from the community), Muskwa River and Prophet River. The entire region of the Northern Rockies Regional Municipality, of which Fort Nelson is the largest community, constitutes 10% of the province's total landmass. Fort Nelson is well known to be surrounded by mountainous beauty pertaining to the northern portion of the Rocky Mountains.

=== Wildlife ===
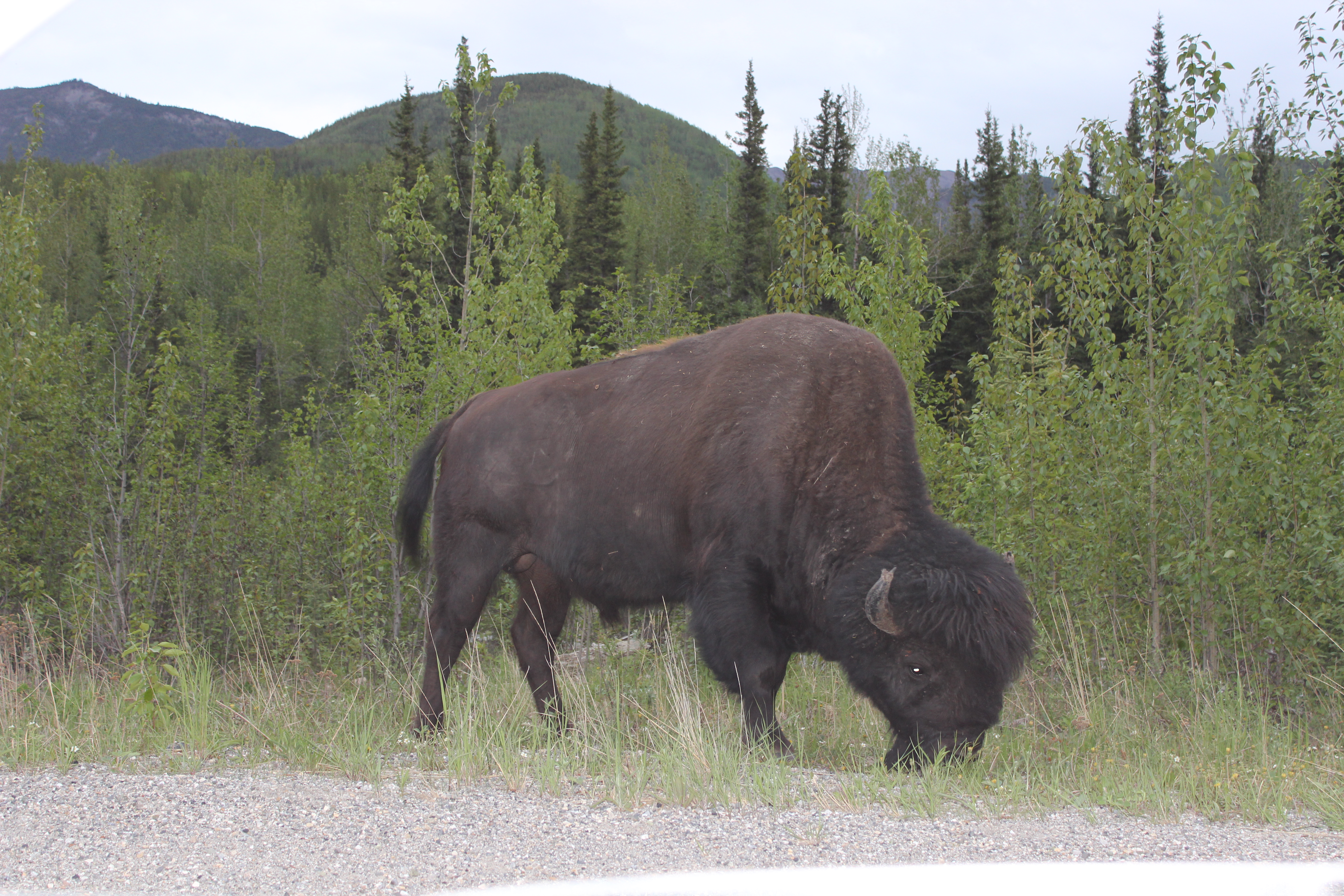
Wood bison in Northern Rockies

The Northern Rockies Regional Municipality is home to an extensive variety of wildlife which attracts many tourists and hunters to the region. Wildlife found in the area include western moose, black bear, grizzly bear, boreal woodland caribou, deer (white-tailed and mule), Rocky Mountain elk, wood bison, stone sheep, mountain goat, and northwestern wolf. The region, especially the area around the Liard Hot Springs, is home to several bird species such as the golden eagle, the bald eagle, and the great horned owl.

=== Climate ===
Fort Nelson has a climate right on the boundary between a humid continental climate (Köppen Dfb) and a subarctic climate (Dfc), with a mean average of 4 months above 10 degrees Celsius placing it just within the former category. Winters, except when dry chinook winds blow from the Pacific Ocean, tend to be severely cold and generally dry with an average monthly snow depth of only 18 cm (7.1 in), while summers are warm and occasionally rainy, though spells of hot weather are rare. Unusual for such a cold place, all 12 months have seen a temperature of above 10 °C (50 °F).

Fort Nelson is colder than anywhere else in British Columbia from November through February, but the mean average temperature during the summer is warmer than coastal areas even far south such as Victoria and comparable to Vancouver.

Climate data for Fort Nelson (Fort Nelson Airport) WMO ID: 71945; coordinates 58°50′11″N 122°35′50″W; elevation: 381.9 m (1,253 ft); 1991–2020 normals (sun 1981–2010), extremes 1937–present
| Month | Jan | Feb | Mar | Apr | May | Jun | Jul | Aug | Sep | Oct | Nov | Dec | Year |
|---|---|---|---|---|---|---|---|---|---|---|---|---|---|
| Record high humidex | 9.0 | 13.3 | 16.1 | 26.7 | 33.9 | 36.4 | 41.2 | 36.6 | 32.3 | 26.7 | 17.8 | 10.4 | 41.2 |
| Record high °C (°F) | 11.6 (52.9) | 15.0 (59.0) | 17.8 (64.0) | 27.3 (81.1) | 32.1 (89.8) | 34.6 (94.3) | 36.7 (98.1) | 34.4 (93.9) | 32.8 (91.0) | 26.7 (80.1) | 18.3 (64.9) | 10.7 (51.3) | 36.7 (98.1) |
| Mean daily maximum °C (°F) | −16.1 (3.0) | −8.7 (16.3) | −1.3 (29.7) | 9.6 (49.3) | 17.1 (62.8) | 21.5 (70.7) | 23.3 (73.9) | 21.6 (70.9) | 15.4 (59.7) | 5.7 (42.3) | −7.9 (17.8) | −14.4 (6.1) | 5.5 (41.9) |
| Daily mean °C (°F) | −20.3 (−4.5) | −14.4 (6.1) | −8.0 (17.6) | 3.0 (37.4) | 10.2 (50.4) | 15.2 (59.4) | 17.3 (63.1) | 15.3 (59.5) | 9.4 (48.9) | 1.0 (33.8) | −11.9 (10.6) | −18.3 (−0.9) | −0.1 (31.8) |
| Mean daily minimum °C (°F) | −24.4 (−11.9) | −20.1 (−4.2) | −14.6 (5.7) | −3.6 (25.5) | 3.3 (37.9) | 8.8 (47.8) | 11.0 (51.8) | 9.0 (48.2) | 3.3 (37.9) | −3.7 (25.3) | −15.8 (3.6) | −22.2 (−8.0) | −5.8 (21.6) |
| Record low °C (°F) | −51.7 (−61.1) | −48.3 (−54.9) | −39.4 (−38.9) | −34.4 (−29.9) | −15.0 (5.0) | −1.5 (29.3) | 1.1 (34.0) | −4.5 (23.9) | −16.7 (1.9) | −28.6 (−19.5) | −41.1 (−42.0) | −47.8 (−54.0) | −51.7 (−61.1) |
| Record low wind chill | −55.0 | −55.6 | −51.5 | −37.6 | −19.9 | −3.3 | 0.0 | −3.8 | −19.7 | −39.2 | −51.6 | −54.6 | −55.6 |
| Average precipitation mm (inches) | 21.5 (0.85) | 14.9 (0.59) | 18.8 (0.74) | 18.9 (0.74) | 49.0 (1.93) | 63.0 (2.48) | 78.4 (3.09) | 71.3 (2.81) | 40.2 (1.58) | 32.6 (1.28) | 25.6 (1.01) | 18.0 (0.71) | 452.1 (17.80) |
| Average rainfall mm (inches) | 0.3 (0.01) | 0.1 (0.00) | 0.3 (0.01) | 7.4 (0.29) | 42.4 (1.67) | 62.9 (2.48) | 78.4 (3.09) | 70.7 (2.78) | 37.4 (1.47) | 12.1 (0.48) | 0.7 (0.03) | 0.2 (0.01) | 312.6 (12.31) |
| Average snowfall cm (inches) | 28.6 (11.3) | 22.4 (8.8) | 27.2 (10.7) | 15.7 (6.2) | 7.5 (3.0) | 0.1 (0.0) | 0.0 (0.0) | 0.6 (0.2) | 3.4 (1.3) | 23.3 (9.2) | 35.3 (13.9) | 26.8 (10.6) | 190.8 (75.1) |
| Average precipitation days (≥ 0.2 mm) | 10.5 | 8.7 | 8.9 | 6.4 | 10.3 | 12.9 | 14.6 | 12.7 | 10.7 | 10.3 | 11.1 | 9.8 | 126.9 |
| Average rainy days (≥ 0.2 mm) | 0.3 | 0.1 | 0.4 | 2.8 | 9.5 | 12.9 | 14.6 | 12.7 | 10.1 | 5.0 | 0.5 | 0.3 | 69.2 |
| Average snowy days (≥ 0.2 cm) | 11.2 | 9.5 | 9.3 | 4.4 | 1.9 | 0.0 | 0.0 | 0.2 | 1.2 | 6.8 | 11.8 | 10.6 | 66.7 |
| Average relative humidity (%) (at 1500 LST) | 71.3 | 63.6 | 50.8 | 41.3 | 42.0 | 45.2 | 50.5 | 51.6 | 53.8 | 66.3 | 77.9 | 75.2 | 57.5 |
| Mean monthly sunshine hours | 64.3 | 99.4 | 166.3 | 236.4 | 267.3 | 285.2 | 273.7 | 258.2 | 170.6 | 97.6 | 60.4 | 48.3 | 2,027.7 |
| Percentage possible sunshine | 29.3 | 38.1 | 45.5 | 54.7 | 51.2 | 51.9 | 50.0 | 53.9 | 44.1 | 30.6 | 25.7 | 24.4 | 41.6 |
Source: Environment and Climate Change Canada (sun)

== Demographics ==
In the 2021 Canadian Census, Fort Nelson had a population of 2,611 living in 1,173 of its 1,622 total dwellings, a -22.4% change from its 2016 population of 3,366. With a land area of 5.02 km^{2} (1.94 sq mi), it had a population density of 520.1/km^{2} (1,347.1/sq mi) in 2021.

As of the 2021 Canadian Census Fort Nelson had 700 Indigenous people made up of 440 First Nations, 215 Métis and 20 Inuit. Fort Nelson is a fairly young community in comparison to the rest of the province, with 20.5% of the population being under the age of 14. Approximately 30.97% of Fort Nelson residents over the age of 25 have attained an education beyond a high school certificate or equivalent in the forms of trades, colleges, or universities.

Historical populations
| Year | Pop. | ±% |
|---|---|---|
| 2001 | 4,188 | — |
| 2006 | 4,514 | +7.8% |
| 2011 | 3,902 | −13.6% |
| 2016 | 3,366 | −13.7% |
| 2021 | 2,611 | −22.4% |

Fort Nelson is home to 2,611 residents, representing 66.15% of the NRRM's total population of 3,947 in 2021.

According to the 2021 census, only 295 people are aged 65 or over, representing only 11% of the overall town population.

== Economy ==
Due to major decrease in oil price in 2014 and lack of pipeline access to the lucrative Asian market, the abundant natural gas in the Horn River Basin remains untapped. Fort Nelson has experienced substantial contraction in economy, noted by significant reduction in business licenses, long term decline in school enrolment and increase in mortgage foreclosures. Before 2014, natural gas, forestry, tourism and agriculture made up the majority of local industry. Nowadays, the town heavily relies upon the government sector and tourism.

The majority of Fort Nelson's economic activity is currently concentrated in the tourism industry and government sector, and until recently, natural gas extraction and forestry. The forests surrounding Fort Nelson are part of Canada's boreal forest. Fort Nelson is on the southwest edge of the Greater Sierra oil and gas field.

In March 2021 the Fort Nelson First Nation received $40.5 million to develop the Clarke Lake Geothermal Project. Project developers are optimistic that this geothermal project will lead to significant economic development in the Fort Nelson region and serve as a model for other indigenous clean energy projects across Canada.

=== Natural gas ===
Unconventional gas exploration was the premier industry in Fort Nelson, employing a large percentage of Fort Nelson's community members. The region's natural gas industry centres around the Horn River Basin, Liard basin, and the Cordova basin which all contain vast amounts of gas in shale rock formations. Many of the world's most recognizable oil and gas companies have actively divested their capital and sold their operations in the region, including Encana, Nexen, Apache, Imperial Oil. The most common form of gas extraction is the combination of horizontal drilling and hydraulic fracturing, in which a drill bit is first vertically, then horizontally inserted deep into the ground in an attempt to reach poorly accessible shale gas formations. As with any gas operation in North America, there are significant concerns to the environmental pollution, First Nations rights, market access and social effects of the industry on the surrounding area. Water is withdrawn from nearby lakes and rivers, which continues to be a hot topic in the region and within the oil and gas industry. The boreal woodland caribou protection initiative also significantly curtailed the area allowed for gas extraction, further dampening investor interest.

On 1 January 2020, NorthRiver Midstream, a subsidiary of Brookfield Infrastructure, announced the completion of purchase of Enbridge assets in northeastern British Columbia, one of which includes the biggest private employer in the town. Shortly afterward on 28 February 2020, NorthRiver Midstream announced the complete shutdown and deactivation of the only gas plant and associated pipelines, resulting in significant job losses of eight local people.

Responding to the February 2020 announcement of the closure of the Fort Nelson gas plant, local MP Bob Zimmer stated, "This announcement is very unfortunate for all in the North and most of all the residents of Fort Nelson. One consistent source of work for residents in Fort Nelson, when other sectors have struggled, has been the Fort Nelson North Processing Facility and now that's gone."

=== Forestry ===
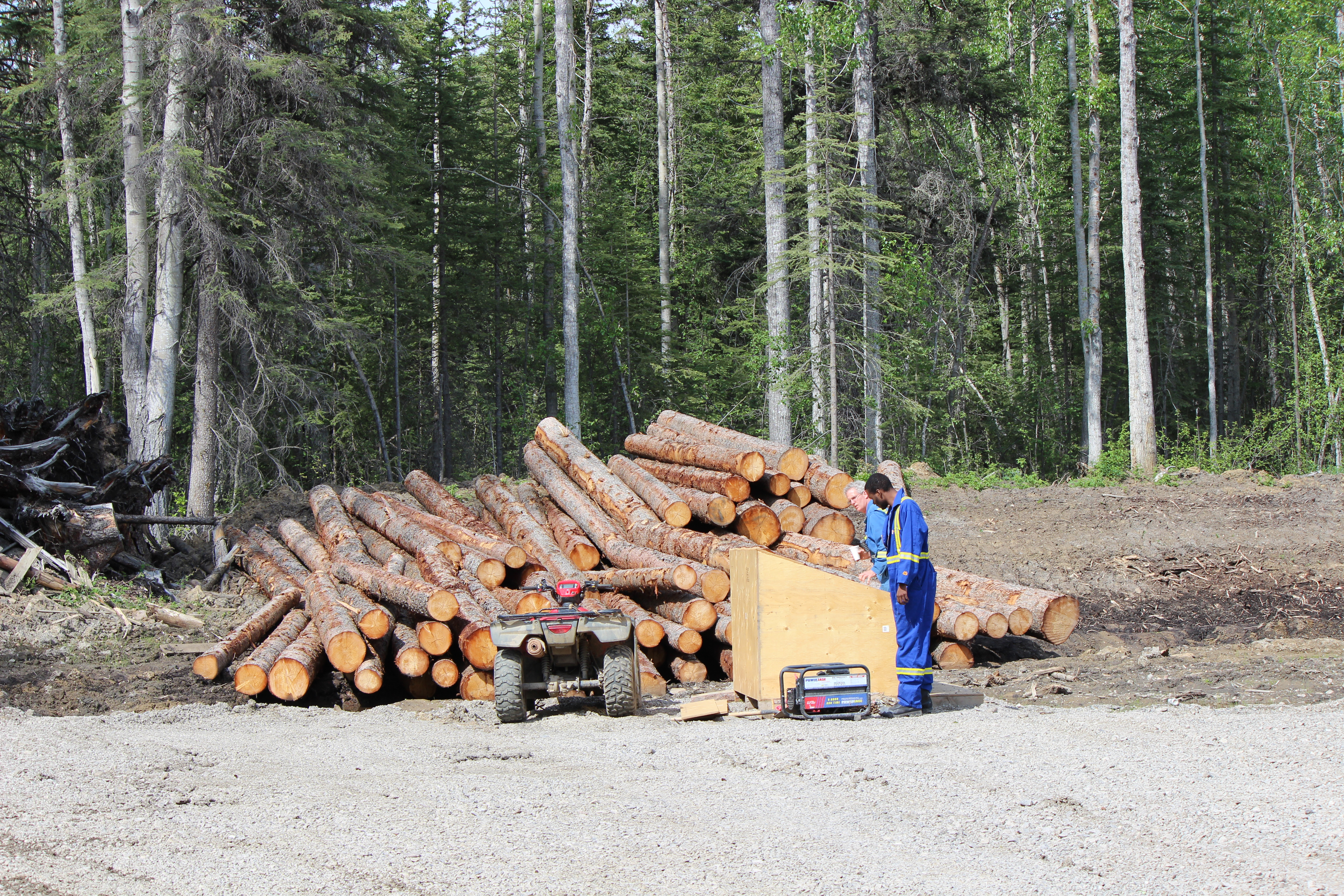
Fort Nelson forestry

Fort Nelson is surrounded by vast plains and mountains of boreal forest. The relatively untouched timber supply was the contributing factor to companies such as Canfor constructing large factories that employed hundreds of people. In recent years, both the Canfor mill and the Tackama mill have completely ceased operations based on high costs and a struggling US housing market. The closure of the mills proved to be devastating for locals, displacing several hundreds of local employees and their families. At present, the municipal government is the largest employer in the region, based on its need for service roads, grant administration, and deforested operational land.

=== Tourism ===
Although very seasonal in Fort Nelson, tourism continues to be an important economic sector in Fort Nelson's economy. Approximately 300,000 tourists, most of whom are retired RV travellers heading to or from Alaska, visit Fort Nelson on an annual basis. The Northern Rockies Regional Municipality is also home to several world-renowned tourist attractions such as the Liard River Hot Springs Provincial Park, Muncho Lake Provincial Park, and the Alaska Highway. Hunting, fishing, snowmobiling, dog sledding, birdwatching and hiking are all popular outdoor recreational activities that draw thousands of tourists to the region every year. Due to coronavirus outbreak, the Northern Lights festival struggled to attract any tourists into the region in 2020.

== Attractions ==
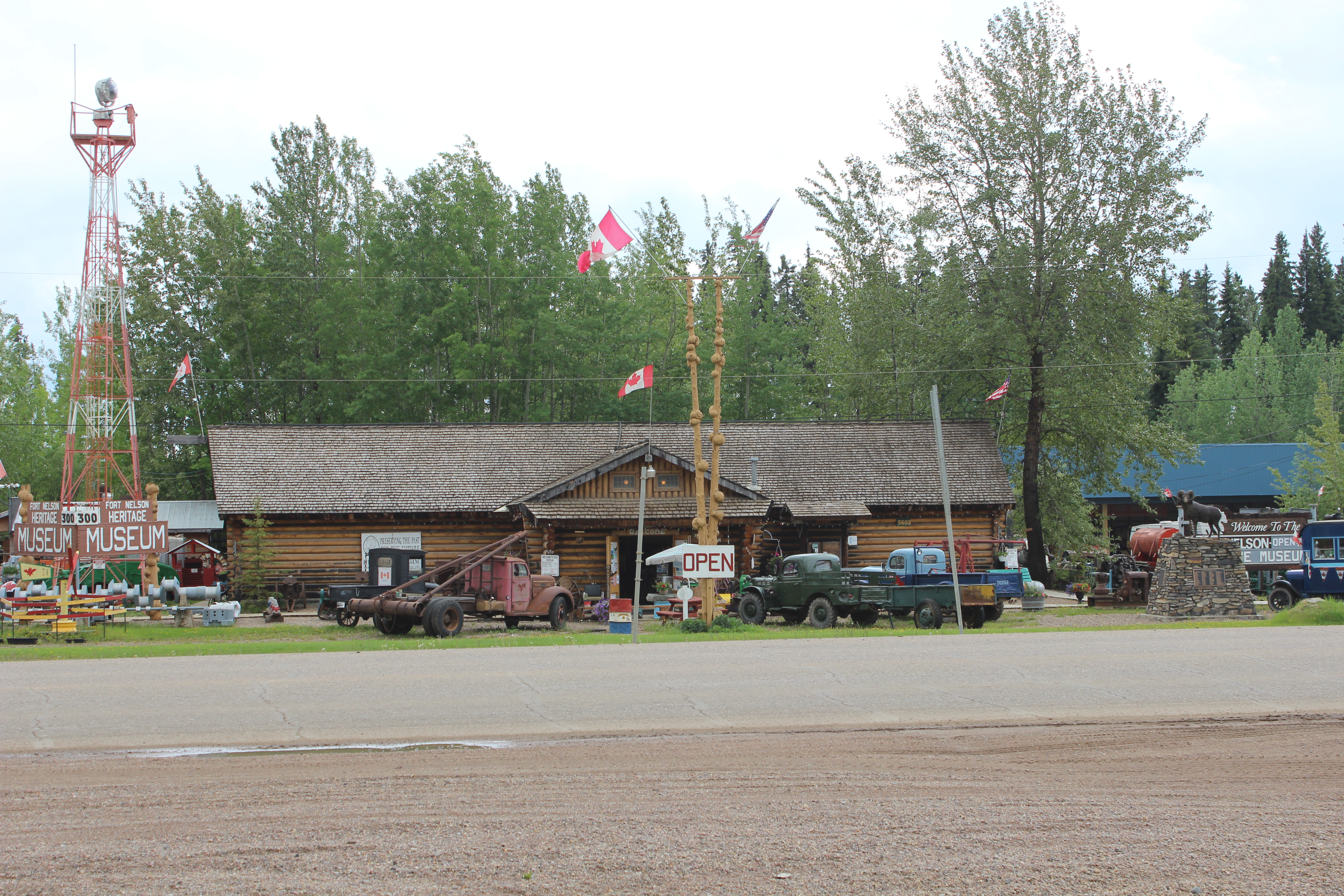
Fort Nelson Heritage Museum, located on the Alaska Highway

- In Fort Nelson
  - Fort Nelson Heritage Museum
  - Poplar Hills Golf Club
  - The Phoenix Theatre
  - Northern Rockies Recreation Centre
  - Fort Nelson Community Literacy Society's October Culture Fest
  - The Northern Lights Festival including:
    - Canadian Open Dog Sled Races
    - Dene Handgames
    - Northern Lights Trappers Rendezvous
  - Trade Show (May)
  - Canoeing down the Fort Nelson River
- In the Northern Rockies
  - Liard Hot Springs
  - Northern Rocky Mountains Provincial Park
  - Smith River Falls – Fort Halkett Provincial Park
  - Wokkpash Lake and the Wokkpash Recreation Area
  - Muncho Lake (of blue-green color, due to glacial flour)
  - Rafting on the Liard River

On 18 June 2005, people in Fort Nelson held a water balloon fight with over 40,000 water balloons being tossed in less than three minutes. At the time, it was a world record.

== Government ==
Fort Nelson was originally incorporated as a village in 1971, but established itself as an unregistered community shortly before that. In 1960, based on significant growth in the oil and gas industry of the region, the Fort Nelson Improvement District was formed in order to provide community members with essential infrastructural needs such as water and sewer services. Harry Clarke was elected the first mayor of Fort Nelson in 1971 and since then, Fort Nelson has consistently elected one regional representative, although not always historically referred to as a mayor. In February 2009, citizens of the region voted heavily in favour of officially amalgamating the region's governing bodies into The Northern Rockies Regional Municipality. The Northern Rockies Regional Municipality is the first of its kind in British Columbia.

== Infrastructure ==
=== Health ===
The Fort Nelson General Hospital was constructed in 1944 and continues to serve the community. As of 2012, citing a lack of a qualified physician, Northern Health advised all pregnant patients that they must travel to other regions (Fort St. John, Grande Prairie, Kelowna) to give birth. All expecting mothers are asked to sign a waiver of understanding. The travel fee and accommodation expenses are not reimbursed.

Despite its small population, there are currently two operating pharmacies.

Due to a shortage in nursing staff, the Fort Nelson General Hospital has advised the public to use the hospital for emergency medical services only.

=== Roads ===
Fort Nelson is located along Highway 97 (Alaska Highway), south of the intersection with the Liard Highway (British Columbia Highway 77).

Sierra Yoyo Desan Road was the main oilfield road in the area starting in Fort Nelson and ending 188 km (117 mi) east north east. With numerous resource roads and winter ice roads entering Alberta through Rainbow Lake or Zama City.

In 2017, national broadcaster CBC said the highway was "one of the deadliest stretches of highway in the province." based on a 2015 Global News report.

Greyhound Canada ceased to operate a bus depot in the community in 2018. Since the departure of Greyhound, residents have found it increasingly difficult to gain access to medical appointments because BC Bus North only has once-weekly scheduled service to serve the community.

=== Airport ===
The Fort Nelson Airport or Northern Rockies Regional Airport (NRRA) is located 3.8 nautical miles (7.0 km; 4.4 mi) east northeast of Fort Nelson. The airport is a Tier-2 regional airport facility in Canada. The only scheduled airline company serving the airport is Central Mountain Air, which has since reduced its service from seven days a week to three days a week and from five daily flights to only one daily trip. Passengers are able to connect to the outside world via Prince George Airport. The Northern Rockies Regional Airport is designated as a non-secure airport and does not offer passenger screening. A business case was proposed in 2015, but due to the lack of demand, the federal government did not approve the provision of Canada Border Services Agency (CBSA) agents. Charter flights are available to other Canadian destinations and the NRRA hosts a number of providers of rotary wing service.

=== Rail ===
CN Rail operates a former BC Rail line that has its northern terminus in Fort Nelson. CN currently brings fuel bi-weekly to supply the area.

== Education ==
Fort Nelson is home to three public elementary schools (G.W. Carlson, and J.S. Clark, both grades K - 4, and R.L. Angus, grades 5 - 7) and one public high school (Fort Nelson Secondary School, grades 8 - 12), as well as an independent school owned and operated by the Fort Nelson First Nation (Chalo School). The Northern Lights College has a small campus situated in Fort Nelson that awards several trades certificates and diplomas to students.

School District 81 Fort Nelson registered the second highest decrease in overall enrolment in British Columbia. The total number of students has decreased by 12.5% since the 2015/16 school year, making the district a significant outlier in reduced enrolment, due to the collapse in population.
