= Muncho Lake Provincial Park =

Provincial park in British Columbia, Canada

- IUCN category II (national park)
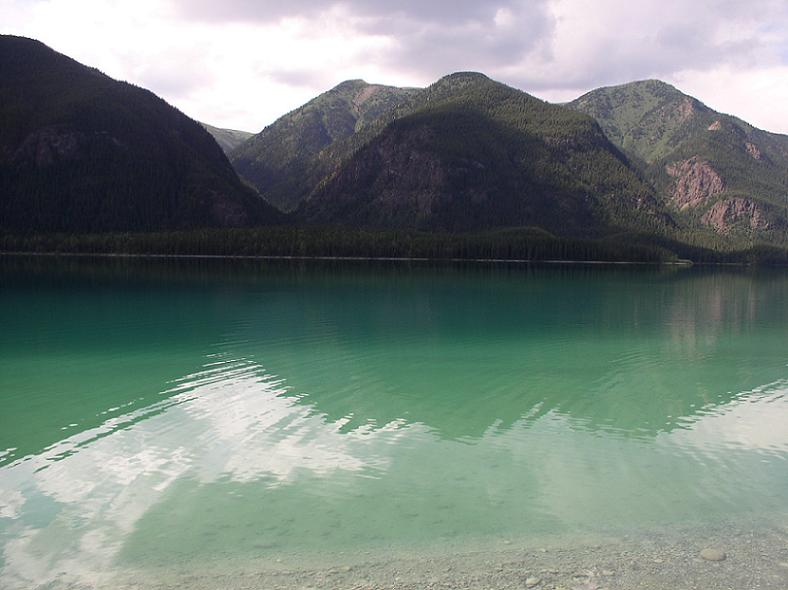
- Muncho Lake

- Location within British Columbia
- Interactive map of Muncho Lake Provincial Park
- Location: Northern Rockies RM, British Columbia, Canada
- Nearest city: Fort Nelson
- Coordinates: 58°57′29″N 125°44′37″W
- Area: 88,420 ha (341.4 sq mi)
- Established: May 31, 1957
- Governing body: BC Parks
- Website: bcparks.ca/explore/parkpgs/muncho_lk/

Muncho Lake Provincial Park is a provincial park in British Columbia, Canada, located on the Alaska Highway as it transits the northernmost Canadian Rockies west of Fort Nelson. The park is part of the larger Muskwa-Kechika Management Area. It is named after Muncho Lake, which is in the park and is both the name of the lake and of the community located there.

== Geology ==
Folded mountains and other geological formations are visible above the road in the southern part of the park. The lake itself is perpetually blue due to copper oxides that are leached from the bedrock.

== Fauna ==
The park has a variety of wildlife species within it. Mammals include bears, wolves, lynx, mountain goats, stone sheep, caribou, and moose, among others. Some fish species that reside in the lake are Arctic Grayling, Lake and Bull Trout, and Whitefish.

== Facilities ==
There are two campgrounds that are available to rent at Muncho Lake Park from the beginning of May to mid-September. They are Strawberry Flats Campground, located at the southern end of the lake, and MacDonald Campground, located at the midpoint of the lake's length. Both campgrounds have about 15 vehicle/tent sites each.

On the west side of Muncho Lake, there are wilderness campgrounds that can be accessed by boat. Boat launches can be found at the Strawberry Flats and MacDonald Campgrounds. There are daily lake tours led by Muncho Lake Tours.

== See also ==
- List of Canadian protected areas
- List of National Parks of Canada
