= Northern Rockies Regional Municipality =

Regional district in British Columbia, Canada

Coordinates: 59°00′00″N 123°45′00″W

Northern Rockies
- District municipality
- Northern Rockies Regional Municipality
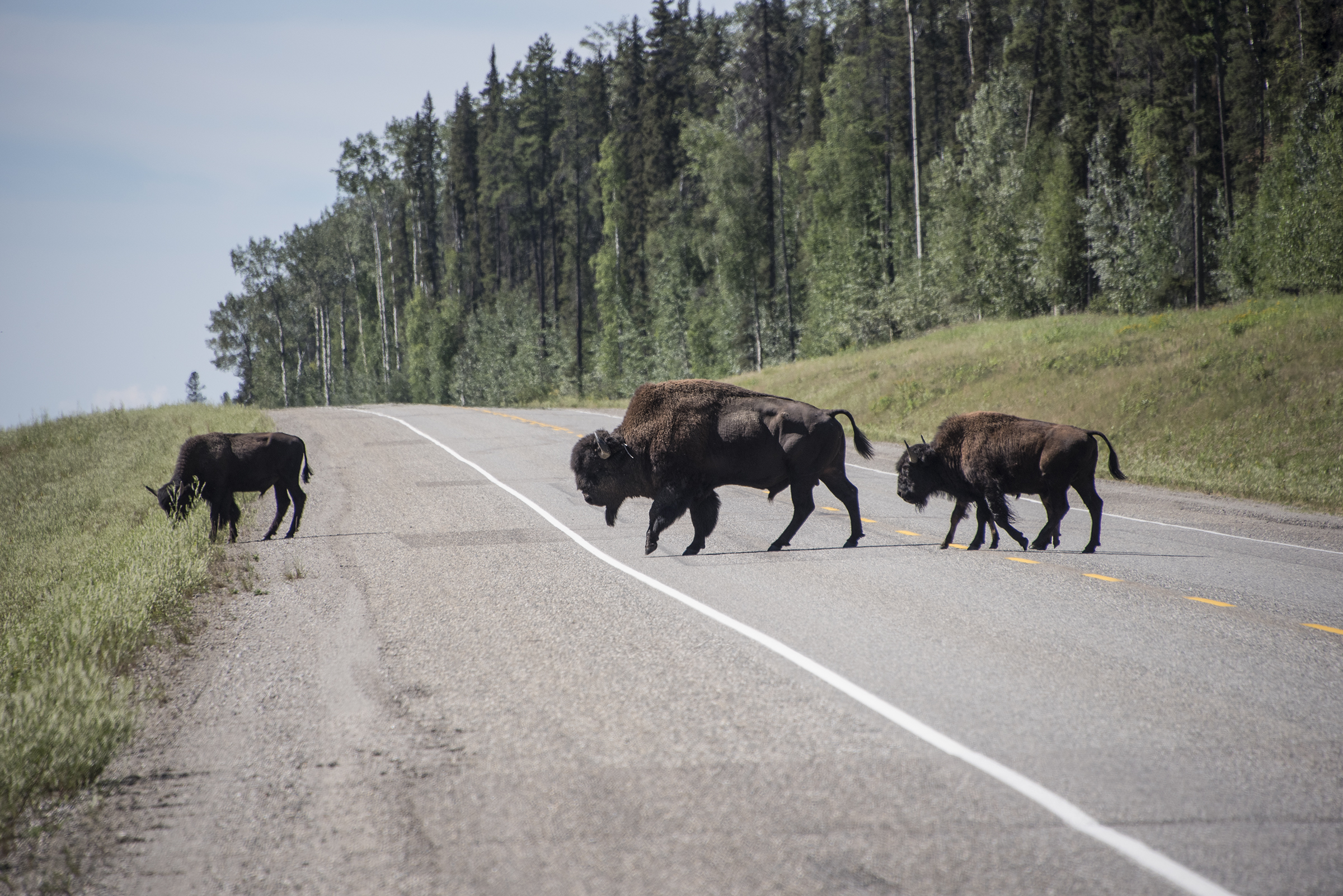
- Bison on the Alaska Highway

- Flag Logo

- Major communities

- Location in British Columbia
- Country: Canada
- Province: British Columbia
- District municipality: February 6, 2009
- Administrative office: Fort Nelson

Government
  - Type: District municipality
  - Mayor: Rob Fraser
  - Councillors: List: Lorraine Gerwing; John Roper; Leslie Dickie; Brenda Enax; Danny Soles; Kyle Andrews

Area (2011)
  - Total: 85,014.52 km^{2} (32,824.29 sq mi)

Population (2021)
  - Total: 4,478 ▼
  - Density: 0.05267/km^{2} (0.1364/sq mi)
- Time zone: UTC-7 (Mountain)
  - Summer (DST): UTC-7 (not observed)
- Postal code: V0C 1R0
- Area code: 250
- Website: www.northernrockies.ca

The Northern Rockies Regional Municipality (NRRM), formerly the Northern Rockies Regional District (NRRD), and before that the Fort Nelson–Liard Regional District, is a single-tier municipality in northeastern British Columbia, Canada. Although described as a regional municipality in its official name, and existing on the same administrative level as a regional district, it is actually classified as a district municipality. The NRRM's offices are located in Fort Nelson, formerly an incorporated town that amalgamated with the NRRD on February 6, 2009, to form the NRRM.

The Peace River-Liard Regional District was incorporated on 31 October 1967. On 22 October 1987, it was split to create the Peace River Regional District and the Fort Nelson-Liard Regional District. On 26 March 1999, the Fort Nelson-Liard Regional District was renamed Northern Rockies Regional District. On 6 February 2009, the Northern Rockies Regional District was amalgamated with the Town of Fort Nelson and named as the Northern Rockies Regional Municipality.

With the Peace River Regional District as the southern part, it was the northern part of the Peace River-Liard Regional District, which was split into two on October 31, 1987.

The NRRM lies on the east slope of the Rocky Mountains and comprises approximately 10% of the total area of the province of British Columbia, encompassing 85,014.52 square kilometres (32,824.29 sq mi). Its southern boundary is the 58th parallel of latitude and is bisected by the Alaska Highway from its southeast to its northwest. The Northern Rockies Regional Municipality is primarily made up of heavily forested areas and mountainous terrain.

The Northern Rockies Regional Municipality is the first of its kind in British Columbia in which an entire former regional district is governed and headed by a single municipal government. Its council comprises a mayor and six councillors. Bill Streeper was the NRRM's first mayor.

== Communities ==
=== Fort Nelson ===
With a 2016 population of 3,366, Fort Nelson is the largest community in the Northern Rockies Regional Municipality. All of the NRRM's offices and officials are based out of Fort Nelson.

=== Fort Nelson First Nation ===
Fort Nelson First Nation is an aboriginal band situated directly outside of the town of Fort Nelson and a signatory nation of Treaty 8. The reserve is home to about 700 residents, making Fort Nelson First Nation one of the largest reservations in northern British Columbia. Dene and Cree are the most prevalent Aboriginal Canadian backgrounds found on the Fort Nelson First Nation reserve. The nation works closely with oil and gas producers to ensure safe and sustainable development in the Horn River Basin based on the fact that much of the new development in the Horn River Basin is occurring on traditional Fort Nelson First Nation land. The band operates Echo-Dene and the Liard Hot Springs lodge, as well as Chalo School, a kindergarten to grade twelve accredited educational institution. Liz Logan is the Chief Councillor of the Fort Nelson First Nation, reelected in August 2014. The FNFN Band Council consists of seven councillors, an increase from six. The chosen councillors then decided amongst themselves the Chief Councillor.

=== Prophet River First Nation ===
Prophet River First Nation is the southernmost community in the Northern Rockies Regional Municipality. Prophet River's main industries revolve around commercial services and provisions to the local and nearby oil and gas industry. Lynette Tsakoza is currently the chief of Prophet River First Nation which is a member of the Treaty 8 Tribal Association.

=== Tetsa River ===
Tetsa River is a small community based on the Alaska Highway that is known for its eco-tourism and camping. Fishing, rafting, hunting, and other eco-tourism related activities are commonly practiced recreational attractants to the region. Tetsa River offers a popular fishing derby every August, in which residents from all over the region compete.

=== Toad River ===
Toad River is the largest regional community north of Fort Nelson in terms of population. The community is home to a highway maintenance camp, a small school accredited by the region's school district (School District 81), a community hall, two campgrounds, and two lodges. Toad River's economy relies primarily on tourism, and is a popular destination for travellers on the Alaska Highway.

=== Muncho Lake ===
Muncho Lake is a community that is situated on the Muncho Lake Provincial Park. The park is known for its blue-coloured lake which attracts tourists to the area every year. Muncho Lake is situated on the Alaska Highway.

== Demographics ==
In the 2021 Census of Population conducted by Statistics Canada, Northern Rockies had a population of 3,947 living in 1,692 of its 2,268 total private dwellings, a change of −18.8% from its 2016 population of 4,862. With a land area of 84,759.31 km^{2} (32,725.75 sq mi), it had a population density of 0.0/km^{2} (0.1/sq mi) in 2021.

As a census division in the 2021 census, Northern Rockies had a population of 4,478 living in 1,918 of its 2,523 total private dwellings, a change of −17% from its 2016 population of 5,393. With a land area of 84,858.88 km^{2} (32,764.20 sq mi), it had a population density of 0.1/km^{2} (0.1/sq mi) in 2021.

=== Ethnicity ===
Panethnic groups in the Northern Rockies Regional Municipality (1996−2021)
Panethnic group	2021		2016		2011		2006		2001		1996	
Panethnic group	Pop.	%	Pop.	%	Pop.	%	Pop.	%	Pop.	%	Pop.	%
European (Note: Statistic includes all persons that did not make up part of a visible minority or an indigenous identity.)	2,670	60.75%	3,465	65.44%	4,080	73.51%	4,610	75.51%	4,620	80.91%	4,830	82.49%
Indigenous	1,410	32.08%	1,485	28.05%	1,235	22.25%	1,185	19.41%	1,050	18.39%	890	15.2%
Southeast Asian (Note: Statistic includes total responses of "Filipino" and "Southeast Asian" under visible minority section on census.)	130	2.96%	210	3.97%	50	0.9%	75	1.23%	15	0.26%	0	0%
South Asian	70	1.59%	30	0.57%	145	2.61%	155	2.54%	0	0%	30	0.51%
African	50	1.14%	35	0.66%	0	0%	50	0.82%	10	0.18%	0	0%
East Asian (Note: Statistic includes total responses of "Chinese", "Korean", and "Japanese" under visible minority section on census.)	40	0.91%	45	0.85%	0	0%	20	0.33%	0	0%	65	1.11%
Latin American	0	0%	10	0.19%	0	0%	0	0%	20	0.35%	25	0.43%
Middle Eastern (Note: Statistic includes total responses of "West Asian" and "Arab" under visible minority section on census.)	0	0%	0	0%	0	0%	0	0%	0	0%	0	0%
Other/multiracial (Note: Statistic includes total responses of "Visible minority, n.i.e." and "Multiple visible minorities" under visible minority section on census.)	0	0%	25	0.47%	15	0.27%	0	0%	0	0%	0	0%
Total responses	4,395	98.15%	5,295	98.18%	5,550	99.5%	6,105	99.32%	5,710	99.83%	5,855	99.98%
Total population	4,478	100%	5,393	100%	5,578	100%	6,147	100%	5,720	100%	5,856	100%
Note: Totals greater than 100% due to multiple origin responses.

=== Religion ===
According to the 2021 census, religious groups in the Northern Rockies Regional Municipality included:

- Irreligion (2,300 persons or 59.5%)
- Christianity (1,460 persons or 37.8%)
- Sikhism (40 persons or 1.0%)
- Other (30 persons or 0.8%)
