= Liard River =

River in Canada

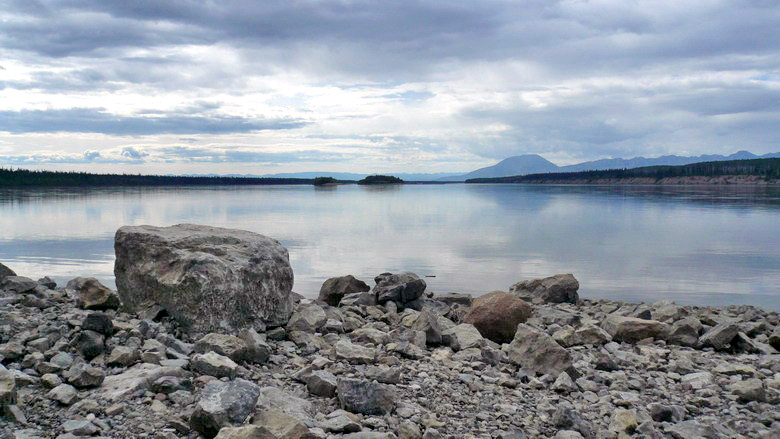
- Liard River, Nahanni Ranges on western horizon

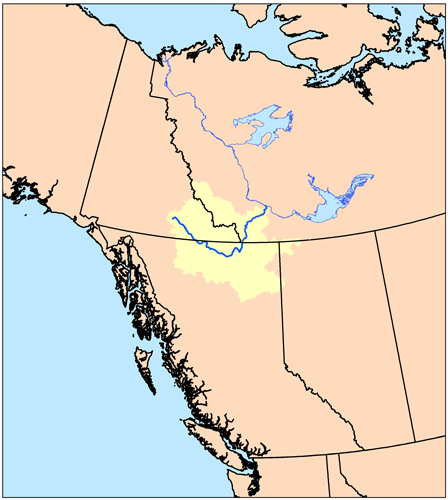

Location
- Country: Canada
- Province: British Columbia
- Territories: Yukon; Northwest Territories

Physical characteristics
- Source: Mount Lewis
  - location: Pelly Mountains, Yukon
  - coordinates: 61°14′12″N 131°37′39″W
  - elevation: 1,500 m (4,900 ft)
- Mouth: Mackenzie River
  - location: Fort Simpson, Northwest Territories
  - coordinates: 61°50′23″N 121°17′58″W
  - elevation: 120 m (390 ft)
- Length: 1,115 km (693 mi)
- Basin size: 277,100 km^{2} (107,000 sq mi)
- Discharge
  - location: near mouth
  - average: 2,434 m^{3}/s (86,000 cu ft/s)
  - minimum: 300 m^{3}/s (11,000 cu ft/s)
  - maximum: 11,000 m^{3}/s (390,000 cu ft/s)

Basin features
- Tributaries
  - left: Frances River (Yukon), Hyland River, Coal River (Canada), Smith River (British Columbia), Graying River, Scatter River, Beaver River (Laird River), South Nahanni River
  - right: Meister River, Rancheria River (Yukon), Dease River, Kechika River, Rabbit River, Vents River, Trout River (British Columbia), Toad River, Fort Nelson River

The Liard River of the North American boreal forest flows through Yukon, British Columbia and the Northwest Territories, Canada. Rising in the Saint Cyr Range of the Pelly Mountains in southeastern Yukon, it flows 1,115 km (693 mi) southeast through British Columbia, marking the northern end of the Rocky Mountains and then curving northeast back into Yukon and Northwest Territories, draining into the Mackenzie River at Fort Simpson, Northwest Territories. The river drains approximately 277,100 km^{2} (107,000 sq mi) of boreal forest and muskeg.

== Geography ==
The river habitats are a subsection of the Lower Mackenzie Freshwater Ecoregion. The area surrounding the river in Yukon is called the Liard River Valley, and the Alaska Highway follows the river for part of its route. This surrounding area is also referred to as the Liard Plain, and is a physiographic section of the larger Yukon–Tanana Uplands province, which in turn is part of the larger Intermontane Plateaus physiographic division.

The Liard River is a crossing area for Nahanni wood bison.

== History ==
To the Kaska Dena people who live upon the upper reach of the river in Yukon and north-west British Columbia, the Indigenous name for the river is Nêtʼił Tué', which means Hanging Down River in the Kaska language. The name comes from a particularly narrow spot near the river's headwaters, where Kaska people used to set goat snares. The "hanging down" - "Nêtʼił" part of the name refers to the snares. The origin of the river's name in mainstream use today is obscure, but is derived from the French word for "Eastern Cottonwood" (a kind of poplar) which grow in abundance along sections of the river. Among the early fur traders, who traveled the river corridor the Liard above the Fort Nelson River was referred to as the "West Branch," while the Fort Nelson River was the "East Branch."

The first European to traverse most of the river was John McLeod of the Hudson's Bay Company (HBC). Leaving Fort Simpson on June 28, 1831, McLeod and eight others ascended the river, reaching and naming the Dease River in just over six weeks. Four days later, they reached the Frances River, and mistakenly ascended it, thinking it was the Liard's main branch. Nine years later, another HBC employee, Robert Campbell, journeyed to the source of the Liard in the St. Cyr Range, renaming the river McLeod had ascended for Frances Ramsay Simpson, the wife of the Sir George Simpson, the HBC's governor who had authorised both expeditions.

The entire Yukon and British Columbia's portion of the river corridor is claimed to be the traditional unceded territory of the Kaska Dena, who have lived in much of the area for thousands of years and claim it as their rightful home. This claim is contested by both the South Slavey Acho Dene Koe First Nation and Fort Nelson First Nation who count among their memberships the former residents of communities along the Liard along its length in north-east BC east of the Rocky Mountains, like Nelson Forks, La Jolie Butte, and Francois, where the Acho Dene Koe signed Treaty 11. Their descendants still live and hunt in the area to this day. Despite Kaska Dene claims, much of the area has been recognized as Fort Nelson and Acho Dene Koe First Nation territory ceded under Treaty 8 and 11 since 1910 and 1922 respectively.

No permanent communities remain on the Liard River between the Rocky Mountains and Fort Liard. A combination of factors led to their decline, the spread of sicknesses like the Spanish flu said to be spread from river traffic travelling up the Liard River via the Northwest Territories hampered the indigenous population in the early 20th century as the fur trade continued to decline. The opening of the Alaska Highway in 1942 and later the Liard Highway in 1984 ended the reliance upon the river and its tributaries for travel and opened north-east BC to industrial development. The discovery of oil and natural gas in the 1950s and the establishment of a local logging industry led to rapid migration of the local South Slavey indigenous population either north, to Fort Liard or south, to Fort Nelson. While no longer living on the river year round, these peoples and their descendants continue to maintain smaller family based camps and trapping cabins along the river's length. Sometimes this takes place on the grounds of the defunct villages, such as at Francois, where they continue to maintain their traditional ways on their traditional territory to this day.

== Features ==
- The Grand Canyon of the Liard is a 30 km (19 mi) stretch of the river beginning just east of Liard River Hotsprings. It contains numerous class IV and higher rapids. It is located between the Toad and Trout Rivers' confluences with the Liard. 59°27′00″N 125°48′00″W The area was the site of extensive study in the late 1970s and early 1980s by BC Hydro for a potential hydroelectric dam. The location, initially known as Site E, later renamed to Devil’s Gorge, was intended as one of a number of potential sister projects to Site C which is now known as the John Horgan Dam on the Peace River. Questions of feasibility and British Columbia’s future electricity needs would lead to the project, along with British Columbia’s other Site projects, being shelved in favour of the John Horgan Dam.
- The Liard Canyon is a separate canyon from the Grand Canyon, and is located near Lower Post. 59°59′00″N 128°36′00″W
- Liard River Hot Springs is a popular tourist attraction located at kilometre 765 of the Alaska Highway.
- The historic Liard River Suspension Bridge, built in 1944, is located at kilometre 798 of the Alaska Highway.

== Course ==
=== Yukon ===
The Liard River originates in south-eastern part of the Yukon, on the slopes of Mount Lewis, at 61°14′12″N 131°37′39″W, at an elevation of 1,500 m (4,900 ft). It flows south and east, between the ranges of Pelly Mountains, then south through the Yukon Plateau, where it receives the waters of Prospect Creek. It turns east after it receives the waters of the Caribou Creek from Caribou Lakes, then the Swede and Junkers Creek. It then follows the southern rim of the St. Cyr Range of the Pelly Mountains, where the Ings River flows into it. It follows the southern edge of the Simpson Range, receiving the waters of the Old Gold Creek, Rainbow Creek, Dome Creek, Quartz Creek and Scurvy Creek. The Liard River continues south-east, north of the Cassiar Mountains, from where it receives the Sayyea Creek and Cabin Creek while the Eckman Creek, Black River and Hasselberg Creek flow in from the north. It continues in a south-east direction, receiving the Sambo Creek, False Pass Creek, Meister River, Frances River, Rancheria River, Tom Creek, Watson Creek and Albert Creek before it flows through Upper Liard, west of Watson Lake, where it is crossed by the Alaska Highway. It receives the waters of Cormier Creek, then flows through the Liard Canyon and into British Columbia.

=== British Columbia ===
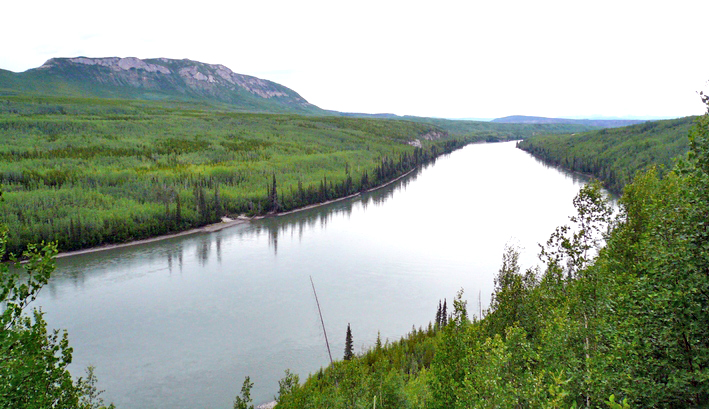
Liard River near Liard River Hot Springs

It flows south-east and east along the Alaska Highway, receiving the waters of Dease River, Kloye Creek, Trepanier Creek and Black Angus Creek. It continues east through the Dease Forest, where it receives the waters of the Hyland River south of Hyland River Provincial Park, then receives the Malcolm Creek, Tatisno Creek and Nustlo Creek. It flows along the Yukon border, where the Alaska Highway once again follows the Liard and receives the Cosh Creek, Contact Creek, Scoby Creek and Sandin Brook, then turns south around Mount Sandin, receiving water from Tsia Creek, Tsinitla Creek, Tatzille Creek and Leguil Creek. It turns eastwards along the northern margin of the Liard Plateau, where it receives the Kechika River near Skooks Landing, Niloil Creek from Niloil Lake and Coal River by Coal River. It continues east and south-east, south of Mount Reid, still followed by the Alaska Highway, receiving the waters of Geddes Creek, Grant Creek, Smith River, Lapie Creek, Teeter Creek, Mould Creek and Hoole Creek.

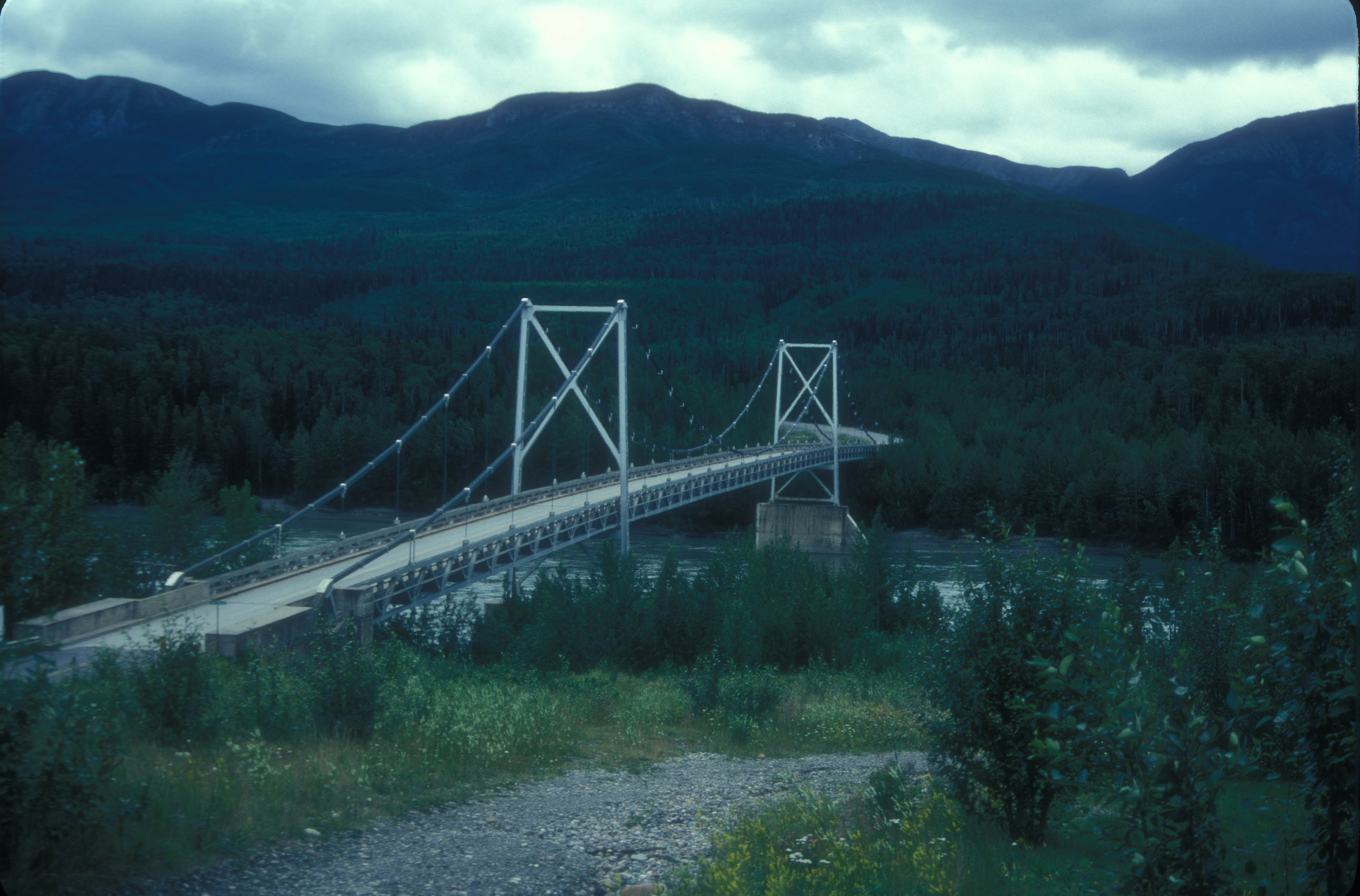
Liard River Suspension Bridge, built in 1944 on the Alaska Highway

It enters the Liard River Hot Springs Provincial Park, where the Trout River empties into the Liard. Alaska Highway runs south along the Trout River, while the Liard flows east through the Liard River Corridor Provincial Park and Protected Area, south of the Sentinel Range of the Muskwa Ranges, receiving the waters of Deer River and Canyon Creek in the Grand Canyon of the Liard. It continues south-east between the Barricade Range and Mount Rothenberg of the Sentinel Range, where the Moule Creek and Sulphur Creek flow in the Liard. It flows east, out of the Northern Rockies and through the foothills, where it receives waters from the Brimstone Creek, Crusty Creek, Grayling River, Graybank Creek and Toad River. It turns north-west, receiving the waters from Garbutt Creek, Lepine Creek, Chimney Creek, Ruthie Creek, Scatter River and Beaver River. It then turns south-east, receives the waters from Catkin Creek, Dunedin River and Fort Nelson River. From here it turns north, receiving the waters of Zus Creek, Sandy Creek and La Biche River and crosses into the Northwest Territories, immediately east of the Yukon border.

=== Northwest Territories ===
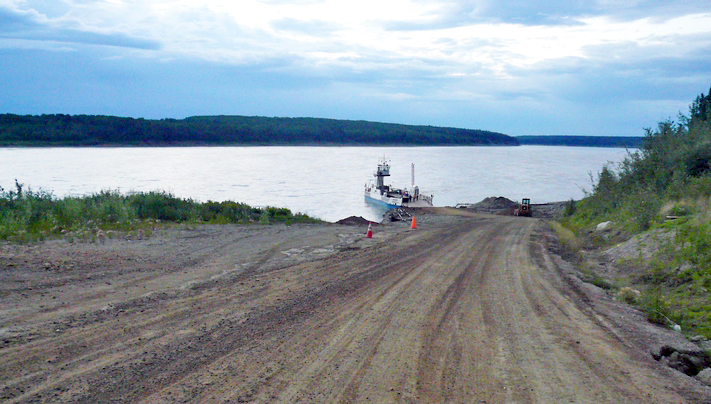
Ferry across Liard River, way to Fort Simpson, Northwest Territories

The Liard River continues north, receiving the waters of Big Island Creek, Kotaneelee River and Petitot River. It turns around Mount Coty of the Franklin Mountains near Fort Liard Airfield, where it meets the Liard Highway. It receives the waters of the Muskeg River, Rabbit Creek and Flett Creek as it flows east of the Liard Range and Mount Flett. The Liard meanders east of the Sawmill Mountain and receives waters from the Beaver Water Creek, Netla River and Bay Creek. After receiving the waters of South Nahanni River south of Nahanni Butte and east of the Nahanni National Park Reserve, the Liard turns east and north-east, receiving waters from Grainger River, Blackstone River, Dehdjida Creek, Matou River, Birch River and Poplar River. It then turns north, being followed by the Mackenzie Highway, and receives the Manners Creek before it empties into the Mackenzie River, immediately upstream of Fort Simpson, at Clay Point, at an elevation of 120 meters (390 ft). The Truesdell Island and Franklin-Clarke Island are formed at the river mouth.

== Tributaries ==
From headwater to mouth, the tributaries of the Liard are:

Yukon

- Prospect Creek
- Swede Creek
- Junkers Creek
- Ings River
- Old Gold Creek
- Rainbow Creek
- Dome Creek
- Quartz Creek
- Scurvy Creek
- Sayyea Creek
- Eckman Creek
- Black River
- Hasselberg Creek
- Sambo Creek
- Meister River
- Frances River
- Rancheria River
- Tom Creek
- Watson Creek
- Albert Creek
- Cormier Creek

British Columbia mountains

- Dease River
- Kloye Creek
- Trepanier Creek
- Black Angus Creek
- Hyland River
- Malcolm Creek
- Tatisno Creek
- Nustlo Creek
- Cosh Creek
- Contact Creek
- Scoby Creek
- Sandin Brook
- Tsia Creek
- Tsinitla Creek
- Tatzille Creek
- Leguil Creek
- Kechika River
- Niloil Creek
- Coal River
- Geddes Creek
- Grant Creek
- Smith River
- Lapie Creek
- Mould Creek
- Hoole Creek
- Trout River
- Deer River
- Canyon Creek
- Moule Creek
- Sulphur Creek

British Columbia foothills and plains

- Brimstone Creek
- Crusty Creek
- Grayling River
- Graybank Creek
- Toad River
- Garbutt Creek
- Lepine Creek
- Chimney Creek
- Ruthie Creek
- Scatter River
- Beaver River
- Catkin Creek
- Dunedin River
- Fort Nelson River
- Zus Creek
- Sandy Creek
- La Biche River

Northwest Territories

- Big Island Creek
- Kotaneelee River
- Petitot River
- Muskeg River
- Rabbit Creek
- Flett Creek
- Beaver Water Creek
- Netla River
- Bay Creek
- South Nahanni River
- Grainger River
- Blackstone River
- Dehdjida Creek
- Matou River
- Birch River
- Poplar River
- Manners Creek

== Communities ==
From mouth to headwater, communities along the river include:

- Fort Simpson
- Fort Liard
- Lower Post, British Columbia
- Watson Lake, Yukon
- Upper Liard, Yukon

== See also ==
- List of longest rivers of Canada
- List of rivers of the Northwest Territories
- List of rivers of British Columbia
- List of rivers of Yukon
