= Geography of Yukon =

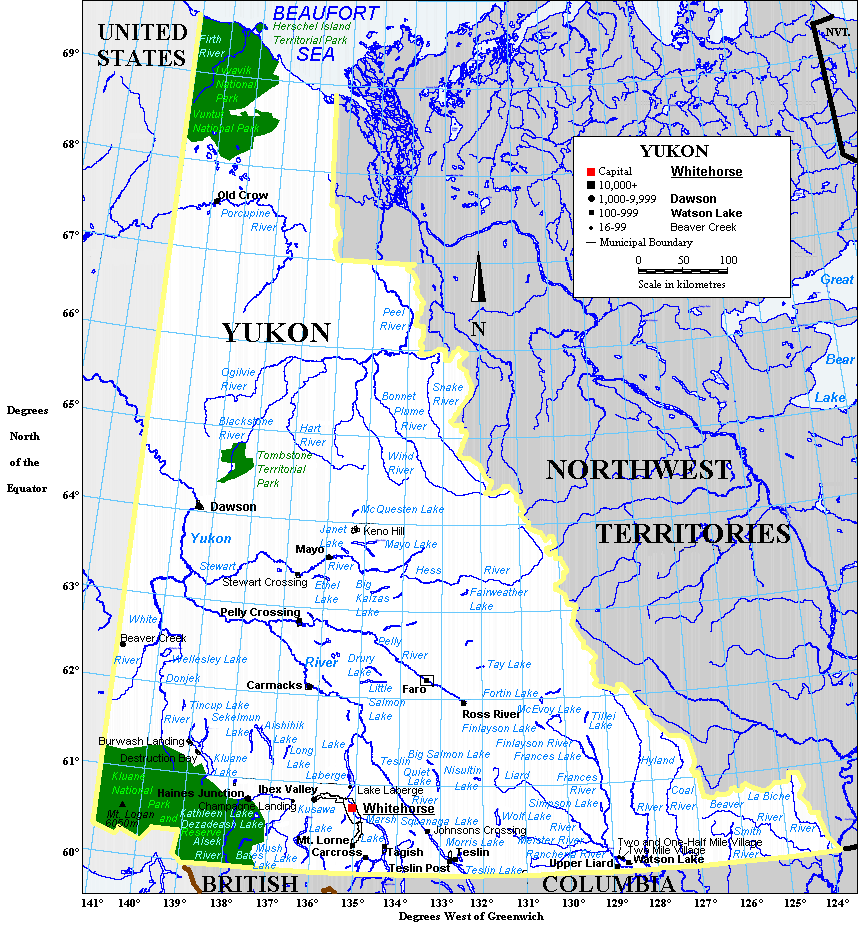
A map of Yukon

Yukon (population as of the 2021 census 40,232) is in the northwestern corner of Canada and is bordered by Alaska, British Columbia and the Northwest Territories. The sparsely populated territory abounds with natural scenery, snowmelt lakes and perennial white-capped mountains, including many of Canada's highest mountains. The territory's climate is Arctic in territory north of Old Crow, subarctic in the region, between Whitehorse and Old Crow, and humid continental climate south of Whitehorse and in areas close to the British Columbia border. Most of the territory is boreal forest with tundra being the main vegetation zone only in the extreme north and at high elevations.

The territory is about the shape of a right triangle, bordering the American state of Alaska to the west, the Northwest Territories to the east and British Columbia to the south. Yukon covers 482,443 km^{2} (186,272 sq mi), of which 474,391 km^{2} (183,163 sq mi) is land and 8,052 km^{2} (3,109 sq mi) is water, making it the thirty-sixth largest subnational entity in the world.

Yukon is bounded on the south by the 60th parallel of latitude. Its northern coast is on the Beaufort Sea. Its western boundary is 141° west longitude. Its ragged eastern boundary largely follows the divide between the Yukon River basin and the Mackenzie River watershed to the east in the Mackenzie Mountains.

== Physical geography ==
Except for the coastal plain on the Beaufort Sea (Arctic Ocean) coast, most of Yukon is part of the American Cordillera. The terrain includes mountain ranges, plateaus and river valleys.

The southwest is dominated by the Kluane ice fields in Kluane National Park and Reserve, the largest non-polar ice fields in the world. Kluane National Park also contains eight of Canada's ten highest mountains, including the five highest, all in the Saint Elias Mountains. A number of glaciers flow out of the ice fields, including the Logan Glacier, the Hubbard Glacier and the Kaskawulsh Glacier.

Permafrost is common. The northern part of Yukon has continuous permafrost, while it is widespread in the central part. Even the southern Yukon has scattered patches of permafrost.

Two major faults, the Denali Fault and the Tintina Fault have created major valleys called trenches: the Shakwak Trench and the Tintina Trench. The Shakwak Trench separates the Kluane ranges from other mountain ranges north of it. The Haines Highway and the Alaska Highway north of Haines Junction are built in the Shakwak Trench. The Tintina Trench bisects the Yukon from northwest to southeast and its edges have rich mineral deposits including the Klondike gold and the lead-zinc deposits near Faro.

=== Volcanoes ===
The volcanoes in Yukon are part of the circle of volcanoes around the Pacific Ocean known as the Ring of Fire. Yukon includes more than 100 separate volcanic centres that have been active during the Quaternary. The Fort Selkirk volcanic field in central Yukon is the northernmost Holocene volcanic field in Canada, including the young active cinder cone, Volcano Mountain. A volcanic field in south-central Yukon is called Alligator Lake volcanic complex. It contains two well-preserved cinder cones that caps a small shield volcano. Lava from the cones travelled north and were erupted at the same time. Volcanoes in south-western Yukon are part of the Wrangell Volcanic Field, which is related to the subduction of the Pacific plate beneath the North American plate at the easternmost end of the Avalanche Trench.

Yukon volcanoes include:

- Volcano Mountain
- Alligator Lake volcanic complex
- Fort Selkirk volcanic field
- Pelly Formation
- Bennett Lake Volcanic Complex
- Sifton Range volcanic complex
- Rabbit Mountain
- Felsite Peak
- Ibex Mountain
- Mount McNeil
- Miles Canyon Basalts
- Ne Ch'e Ddhawa
- Skukum Group
- Upper Becker Creek Cone

=== Mountain ranges ===
The Saint Elias Mountains are part of the Coast Mountains which range from southern British Columbia to Alaska and cover the southwestern Yukon. While the Saint Elias Mountains contain the highest mountains, there are numerous other mountain ranges, from the British Mountains in the far north and the Richardson Mountains in the northeast, both of which are part of the Brooks Range, to the Selwyn Mountains and Mackenzie Mountains in the east, the Cassiar Mountains in the south-east, the Pelly Mountains in the central Yukon, and the Ogilvie Mountains north of Dawson City and along the Dempster Highway.

Yukon mountain ranges include:

- Brooks Range (mostly in northern Alaska)
  - British Mountains, Yukon
  - Richardson Mountains, Yukon
- Cassiar Mountains, British Columbia and Yukon
- Mackenzie Mountains, Northwest Territories and Yukon
  - Logan Mountains, Yukon
- Selwyn Mountains, Yukon
  - Hess Mountains, Yukon
  - Nadaleen Range, Yukon
  - Bonnet Plume Range, Yukon
  - Wernecke Mountains Group, Yukon
  - Knorr Range, Yukon
- Pacific Coast Ranges, Mexico to Alaska
  - Coast Mountains, also in British Columbia and the Alaska Panhandle
  - Saint Elias Mountains, southern Alaska, Yukon and British Columbia
    - Kluane Ranges, Yukon
    - Alsek Ranges, Yukon, British Columbia and Alaska
- Yukon Ranges
  - Anvil Range
  - Dawson Range
  - Miners Range, Yukon
  - Nisling Range
  - Ogilvie Mountains, Yukon
    - Nahoni Range
  - Pelly Mountains, Yukon
    - Big Salmon Range, Yukon
    - Glenlyon Range
    - Saint Cyr Range
  - Ruby Range, Yukon

=== Highest mountains ===
Highest mountains in the Yukon
Mountain	Height (metres)	Height (feet)	Rank
Mount Logan	5,959	19,551	Highest mountain in Canada
Mount Saint Elias	5,489	18,009	#2 in both Canada and the USA
Mount Lucania	5,226	17,146	#3 in Canada
King Peak	5,173	16,972	#4 in Canada
Mount Steele	5,073	16,644	#5 in Canada
Mount Wood	4,842	15,886	#7 in Canada
Mount Vancouver	4,812	15,787	#8 in Canada
Mount Slaggard	4,742	15,558	#10 in Canada
Mount Macaulay	4,690	15,390	
Mount Hubbard	4,577	15,016	
Mount Walsh	4,507	14,787	
Mount Alverstone	4,439	14,564	
McArthur Peak	4,389	14,400	
Mount Augusta	4,289	14,072	

== Hydrography ==
Most of the territory is in the watershed of its namesake, the Yukon River, which flows into the Bering Sea. Southern Yukon is dotted with a large number of large, long and narrow glacier-fed alpine lakes, most of which flow into the Yukon River system. The larger lakes include: Teslin Lake, Atlin Lake, Tagish Lake, Marsh Lake, Lake Laberge, Kusawa Lake, Kluane Lake. Bennett Lake on the Klondike Gold Rush trail is a smaller lake flowing into Tagish Lake.

Köppen types of Yukon

Other rivers flow either directly into the Pacific Ocean or directly or indirectly into the Arctic Ocean. The Alsek - Tatshenshini drainage flows directly into the Pacific from southwestern Yukon. A number of rivers in northern Yukon flow directly into the Arctic Ocean. The two main Yukon rivers flowing into the Mackenzie River in the Northwest Territories are the Liard River in the southeast and the Peel River and its tributaries in the northeast.

== Climate ==
Most of Yukon has a subarctic climate (Köppen climate classification Dfc), characterized by long cold winters and brief warm summers. The airstrip at Snag, 25 km (16 mi) east of Beaver Creek near the Alaska border, experienced the lowest ever temperature measured in North America (outside of Greenland), −63.0 °C (−81.4 °F) on 3 February 1947. The Arctic Ocean coast has a polar climate (ET). The climate is generally very dry, with little precipitation, but is considerably wetter in the southeast. Precipitation is much greater in the mountains, and the snow pack continues to melt well into the summer, resulting in high water in July or August.

Representative climate normals
Zone	Average annual temperature	Average July temperature	Average January temperature	Average snowfall	Average rainfall
North (Old Crow)	−7.7 °C (18.1 °F)	14.8 °C (58.6 °F)	−28.7 °C (−19.7 °F)	154.9 cm (60.98 in)	160.1 mm (6.30 in)
Central (Dawson City)	−3.8 °C (25.2 °F)	15.9 °C (60.6 °F)	−25.7 °C (−14.3 °F)	161.9 cm (63.74 in)	207.8 mm (8.18 in)
South (Whitehorse)	0.2 °C (32.4 °F)	14.5 °C (58.1 °F)	−15.0 °C (5.0 °F)	147.6 cm (58.11 in)	164.3 mm (6.47 in)
Southeast (Watson Lake)	−2.1 °C (28.2 °F)	9.3 °C (48.7 °F)	−26.7 °C (−16.1 °F)	197.0 cm (77.56 in)	260.9 mm (10.27 in)

Climate data for Old Crow (Old Crow Airport) Climate ID: 2100800; coordinates 67°34′14″N 159°30′21″W; elevation: 250.2 m (821 ft); 1991–2020 normals, extremes 1951–present (Note: Composite data from Old Crow RCS: WMO ID: 71044; coordinates 67°34′14″N 159°30′21″W; elevation: 251.2 m (824 ft))
Month	Jan	Feb	Mar	Apr	May	Jun	Jul	Aug	Sep	Oct	Nov	Dec	Year
Record high humidex	0.5	2.8	6.5	15.0	28.1	32.2	35.5	38.4	22.5	15.2	0.5	1.3	38.4
Record high °C (°F)	2.5 (36.5)	3.0 (37.4)	7.0 (44.6)	15.9 (60.6)	28.1 (82.6)	32.3 (90.1)	32.4 (90.3)	32.8 (91.0)	23.9 (75.0)	17.5 (63.5)	6.1 (43.0)	1.7 (35.1)	32.8 (91.0)
Mean daily maximum °C (°F)	−24.6 (−12.3)	−20.8 (−5.4)	−14.7 (5.5)	−2.8 (27.0)	10.2 (50.4)	19.3 (66.7)	20.4 (68.7)	16.1 (61.0)	8.1 (46.6)	−4.4 (24.1)	−17.6 (0.3)	−21.4 (−6.5)	−2.7 (27.1)
Daily mean °C (°F)	−28.7 (−19.7)	−25.6 (−14.1)	−21.2 (−6.2)	−9.1 (15.6)	4.3 (39.7)	13.2 (55.8)	14.8 (58.6)	10.9 (51.6)	3.8 (38.8)	−7.8 (18.0)	−21.6 (−6.9)	−25.5 (−13.9)	−7.7 (18.1)
Mean daily minimum °C (°F)	−32.9 (−27.2)	−30.4 (−22.7)	−27.6 (−17.7)	−15.3 (4.5)	−1.6 (29.1)	7.0 (44.6)	9.2 (48.6)	5.7 (42.3)	−0.4 (31.3)	−11.2 (11.8)	−25.5 (−13.9)	−29.6 (−21.3)	−12.7 (9.1)
Record low °C (°F)	−59.4 (−74.9)	−54.4 (−65.9)	−48.3 (−54.9)	−39.5 (−39.1)	−28.0 (−18.4)	−8.3 (17.1)	−2.5 (27.5)	−9.5 (14.9)	−22.5 (−8.5)	−38.0 (−36.4)	−47.0 (−52.6)	−56.7 (−70.1)	−59.4 (−74.9)
Record low wind chill	−59.6	−55.8	−51.9	−44.5	−32.0	−10.4	0.0	−11.9	−20.3	−42.0	−53.2	−57.3	−59.6
Average precipitation mm (inches)	13.5 (0.53)	20.3 (0.80)	15.6 (0.61)	11.7 (0.46)	21.8 (0.86)	36.5 (1.44)	42.4 (1.67)	48.2 (1.90)	27.8 (1.09)	20.6 (0.81)	18.3 (0.72)	18.4 (0.72)	294.8 (11.61)
Average rainfall mm (inches)	0.0 (0.0)	0.1 (0.00)	0.0 (0.0)	0.7 (0.03)	9.1 (0.36)	34.7 (1.37)	48.1 (1.89)	44.4 (1.75)	21.5 (0.85)	1.6 (0.06)	0.0 (0.0)	0.0 (0.0)	160.1 (6.30)
Average snowfall cm (inches)	16.3 (6.4)	16.9 (6.7)	16.2 (6.4)	9.0 (3.5)	6.4 (2.5)	3.6 (1.4)	0.0 (0.0)	1.0 (0.4)	8.7 (3.4)	27.5 (10.8)	26.6 (10.5)	22.7 (8.9)	154.9 (61.0)
Average precipitation days (≥ 0.2 mm)	11.0	10.8	11.6	7.9	10.5	11.3	14.1	15.3	12.8	14.2	12.3	12.2	144.0
Average rainy days (≥ 0.2 mm)	0.00	0.06	0.0	0.68	4.2	10.1	14.4	14.3	9.5	1.2	0.0	0.0	54.5
Average snowy days (≥ 0.2 cm)	10.8	10.4	10.1	5.7	3.00	1.0	0.0	0.4	4.1	14.1	14.2	12.8	86.4
Average relative humidity (%) (at 1500 LST)	72.6	72.6	61.1	56.7	49.3	46.0	53.8	61.2	66.2	79.5	80.1	75.8	64.6
Source: Environment and Climate Change Canada (June maximum) (July maximum)

Climate data for Dawson (Dawson City Airport) Climate ID: 2100402; coordinates 64°02′35″N 139°07′40″W; elevation: 370.3 m (1,215 ft); 1991–2020 normals, extremes 1897–present (Note: Composite data from Dawson: WMO ID: 71966; coordinates 64°03′39″N 139°07′36″W; elevation: 370 m (1,210 ft))
Month	Jan	Feb	Mar	Apr	May	Jun	Jul	Aug	Sep	Oct	Nov	Dec	Year
Record high humidex	9.7	8.8	14.3	22.8	34.9	34.4	39.4	37.9	24.9	19.9	10.0	6.6	39.4
Record high °C (°F)	9.7 (49.5)	9.5 (49.1)	14.8 (58.6)	22.5 (72.5)	34.7 (94.5)	34.5 (94.1)	35.0 (95.0)	33.5 (92.3)	25.3 (77.5)	17.7 (63.9)	10.6 (51.1)	6.5 (43.7)	35.0 (95.0)
Mean daily maximum °C (°F)	−21.6 (−6.9)	−15.1 (4.8)	−4.2 (24.4)	7.9 (46.2)	16.4 (61.5)	22.1 (71.8)	23.1 (73.6)	19.5 (67.1)	12.6 (54.7)	0.2 (32.4)	−13.7 (7.3)	−18.8 (−1.8)	2.4 (36.3)
Daily mean °C (°F)	−25.7 (−14.3)	−20.9 (−5.6)	−12.6 (9.3)	0.4 (32.7)	8.8 (47.8)	14.4 (57.9)	15.9 (60.6)	12.7 (54.9)	6.4 (43.5)	−4.0 (24.8)	−17.7 (0.1)	−23.0 (−9.4)	−3.8 (25.2)
Mean daily minimum °C (°F)	−29.8 (−21.6)	−26.5 (−15.7)	−20.9 (−5.6)	−7.1 (19.2)	1.2 (34.2)	6.7 (44.1)	8.7 (47.7)	5.8 (42.4)	0.2 (32.4)	−8.2 (17.2)	−21.7 (−7.1)	−27.1 (−16.8)	−9.9 (14.2)
Record low °C (°F)	−56.2 (−69.2)	−58.3 (−72.9)	−47.5 (−53.5)	−32.0 (−25.6)	−13.5 (7.7)	−3.0 (26.6)	−2.0 (28.4)	−11.0 (12.2)	−23.2 (−9.8)	−36.5 (−33.7)	−47.9 (−54.2)	−52.8 (−63.0)	−55.8 (−68.4)
Record low wind chill	−60.3	−58.6	−47.7	−37.9	−18.5	−5.0	−2.8	−9.2	−25.8	−41.0	−51.3	−60.0	−60.3
Average precipitation mm (inches)	17.6 (0.69)	13.2 (0.52)	11.2 (0.44)	10.7 (0.42)	27.9 (1.10)	43.7 (1.72)	48.1 (1.89)	47.8 (1.88)	30.4 (1.20)	25.7 (1.01)	22.6 (0.89)	19.6 (0.77)	318.5 (12.54)
Average rainfall mm (inches)	0.1 (0.00)	0.2 (0.01)	0.3 (0.01)	3.3 (0.13)	24.5 (0.96)	41.1 (1.62)	53.3 (2.10)	43.0 (1.69)	33.3 (1.31)	8.6 (0.34)	0.2 (0.01)	0.0 (0.0)	207.8 (8.18)
Average snowfall cm (inches)	28.4 (11.2)	16.7 (6.6)	13.7 (5.4)	6.2 (2.4)	2.0 (0.8)	0.0 (0.0)	0.0 (0.0)	0.0 (0.0)	4.0 (1.6)	24.3 (9.6)	33.0 (13.0)	33.5 (13.2)	161.9 (63.7)
Average precipitation days (≥ 0.2 mm)	12.3	8.7	9.0	9.3	14.5	13.9	15.9	15.8	12.6	12.0	13.2	11.3	148.6
Average rainy days (≥ 0.2 mm)	0.21	0.1	0.22	2.6	10.1	12.5	14.5	14.2	11.5	3.7	0.27	0.05	69.7
Average snowy days (≥ 0.2 cm)	12.3	9.2	7.6	2.8	0.9	0.0	0.0	0.0	1.7	9.6	13.2	13.5	70.7
Average relative humidity (%) (at 1500 LST)	75.2	73.1	52.3	36.4	32.7	37.4	43.7	48.4	52.9	72.1	80.3	78.3	56.9
Source: Environment and Climate Change Canada {February minimum) (July maximum) (December minimum}

Climate data for Whitehorse (Erik Nielsen Whitehorse International Airport) WMO ID: 71964; coordinates 60°42′34″N 135°04′07″W; elevation: 706.2 m (2,317 ft); 1991–2020 normals, extremes 1900–present (Note: Climate data was recorded in the area of downtown Whitehorse from July 1900 to March 1942 and at Whitehorse Airport from April 1942 to present.) (Note: Composite station data: Whitehorse Auto - Climate ID: 2101310, WMO ID: 71773, 60°43′59″N 135°05′52″W, 707 m (2,320 ft) and Whitehorse A - Climate ID: 2101300 / 2101303, WMO ID: 71964 / 71964, 60°42′34.2″N 135°04′07.8″W / 60°42′34″N 135°04′02″W, 706.2 m (2,317 ft))
Month	Jan	Feb	Mar	Apr	May	Jun	Jul	Aug	Sep	Oct	Nov	Dec	Year
Record high humidex	9.5	10.0	16.6	21.6	28.3	32.8	33.6	31.9	24.5	19.0	10.4	9.2	33.6
Record high °C (°F)	10.9 (51.6)	11.7 (53.1)	16.8 (62.2)	21.8 (71.2)	34.1 (93.4)	34.4 (93.9)	33.2 (91.8)	31.6 (88.9)	26.7 (80.1)	19.3 (66.7)	11.7 (53.1)	10.6 (51.1)	34.4 (93.9)
Mean maximum °C (°F)	3.3 (37.9)	3.7 (38.7)	7.5 (45.5)	14.7 (58.5)	22.4 (72.3)	27.0 (80.6)	27.4 (81.3)	26.5 (79.7)	19.3 (66.7)	12.5 (54.5)	4.1 (39.4)	3.1 (37.6)	29.1 (84.4)
Mean daily maximum °C (°F)	−11.1 (12.0)	−7.1 (19.2)	−1.1 (30.0)	7.1 (44.8)	14.2 (57.6)	19.3 (66.7)	20.5 (68.9)	18.5 (65.3)	12.3 (54.1)	4.3 (39.7)	−5.4 (22.3)	−9.1 (15.6)	5.2 (41.4)
Daily mean °C (°F)	−15.0 (5.0)	−11.9 (10.6)	−6.7 (19.9)	1.6 (34.9)	7.9 (46.2)	12.8 (55.0)	14.5 (58.1)	12.9 (55.2)	7.5 (45.5)	0.8 (33.4)	−8.6 (16.5)	−12.8 (9.0)	0.2 (32.4)
Mean daily minimum °C (°F)	−18.9 (−2.0)	−16.6 (2.1)	−12.4 (9.7)	−4.0 (24.8)	1.6 (34.9)	6.2 (43.2)	8.5 (47.3)	7.2 (45.0)	2.7 (36.9)	−2.8 (27.0)	−11.8 (10.8)	−16.5 (2.3)	−4.7 (23.5)
Mean minimum °C (°F)	−38.1 (−36.6)	−31.8 (−25.2)	−28.9 (−20.0)	−14.9 (5.2)	−4.7 (23.5)	0.1 (32.2)	3.5 (38.3)	0.7 (33.3)	−4.8 (23.4)	−13.9 (7.0)	−25.8 (−14.4)	−32.7 (−26.9)	−40.7 (−41.3)
Record low °C (°F)	−56.2 (−69.2)	−51.2 (−60.2)	−40.6 (−41.1)	−29.4 (−20.9)	−12.9 (8.8)	−5.7 (21.7)	−0.5 (31.1)	−4.4 (24.1)	−19.4 (−2.9)	−31.1 (−24.0)	−41.0 (−41.8)	−47.8 (−54.0)	−56.2 (−69.2)
Record low wind chill	−61.3	−62.4	−47.5	−35.0	−18.6	−6.8	0.0	−6.4	−21.4	−45.3	−51.4	−59.2	−62.4
Average precipitation mm (inches)	22.3 (0.88)	14.7 (0.58)	11.5 (0.45)	8.4 (0.33)	15.4 (0.61)	35.2 (1.39)	39.2 (1.54)	39.0 (1.54)	30.9 (1.22)	23.1 (0.91)	23.5 (0.93)	16.4 (0.65)	279.6 (11.01)
Average rainfall mm (inches)	0.1 (0.00)	0.0 (0.0)	0.0 (0.0)	1.2 (0.05)	12.9 (0.51)	34.4 (1.35)	37.5 (1.48)	40.4 (1.59)	26.8 (1.06)	9.9 (0.39)	0.9 (0.04)	0.2 (0.01)	164.3 (6.47)
Average snowfall cm (inches)	28.8 (11.3)	18.3 (7.2)	16.1 (6.3)	7.0 (2.8)	2.8 (1.1)	0.2 (0.1)	0.0 (0.0)	0.0 (0.0)	3.6 (1.4)	17.2 (6.8)	28.4 (11.2)	25.3 (10.0)	147.6 (58.1)
Average precipitation days (≥ 0.2 mm)	12.7	9.2	7.2	5.1	7.3	11.1	13.0	12.0	12.2	10.7	13.0	11.3	124.7
Average rainy days (≥ 0.2 mm)	0.17	0.06	0.0	1.1	6.9	10.8	13.0	12.3	11.6	5.4	0.88	0.37	62.7
Average snowy days (≥ 0.2 cm)	12.4	8.8	7.6	3.4	1.40	0.1	0.0	0.0	1.5	7.1	11.9	12.1	66.2
Average relative humidity (%) (at 1500 LST)	74.9	65.9	49.7	40.2	36.2	40.0	46.3	48.2	54.0	64.9	77.1	77.8	56.3
Average dew point °C (°F)	−19.1 (−2.4)	−15.8 (3.6)	−13.5 (7.7)	−7.1 (19.2)	−2.2 (28.0)	3.2 (37.8)	6.3 (43.3)	5.5 (41.9)	1.5 (34.7)	−3.8 (25.2)	−11.8 (10.8)	−16.1 (3.0)	−6.0 (21.2)
Mean monthly sunshine hours	43.8	105.5	163.2	238.5	251.1	266.7	247.6	226.5	132.7	84.9	39.8	26.8	1,827.1
Percentage possible sunshine	21.4	41.6	44.8	54.4	46.8	46.9	43.8	46.4	34.1	27.0	17.8	14.9	36.7
Average ultraviolet index	0	1	1	3	4	5	5	4	2	1	0	0	2
Source 1: Environment and Climate Change Canada (sun), (UV), (1900–1960), (January minimum), (January maximum)
Source 2: weatherstats.ca (for dewpoint and monthly/yearly average absolute maximum/minimum temperature)

Climate data for Watson Lake (Watson Lake Airport) WMO ID: 71953; coordinates 60°06′59″N 128°49′20″W; elevation: 687.4 m (2,255 ft); 1991–2020 normals, extremes 1938–present (Note: Composite data from: Watson Lake A; Climate ID: 2101201; coordinates 60°06′59″N 128°49′21″W; elevation: 687.3 m (2,255 ft): Watson Lake (AUT); WMO ID: 71199; coordinates 60°06′57″N 128°49′55″W; elevation: 683.3 m (2,242 ft))
Month	Jan	Feb	Mar	Apr	May	Jun	Jul	Aug	Sep	Oct	Nov	Dec	Year
Record high humidex	7.8	11.1	16.0	20.0	34.2	33.3	41.6	36.8	26.8	17.6	11.7	7.9	41.6
Record high °C (°F)	8.9 (48.0)	12.2 (54.0)	16.6 (61.9)	20.1 (68.2)	34.2 (93.6)	33.9 (93.0)	35.4 (95.7)	32.8 (91.0)	28.9 (84.0)	21.7 (71.1)	12.2 (54.0)	8.4 (47.1)	35.4 (95.7)
Mean daily maximum °C (°F)	−16.7 (1.9)	−9.8 (14.4)	−2.2 (28.0)	7.0 (44.6)	14.7 (58.5)	19.7 (67.5)	21.3 (70.3)	19.1 (66.4)	13.0 (55.4)	3.6 (38.5)	−9.3 (15.3)	−15.6 (3.9)	3.7 (38.7)
Daily mean °C (°F)	−21.7 (−7.1)	−16.5 (2.3)	−10.2 (13.6)	0.2 (32.4)	8.3 (46.9)	13.6 (56.5)	15.3 (59.5)	13.2 (55.8)	7.7 (45.9)	−0.4 (31.3)	−13.9 (7.0)	−20.4 (−4.7)	−2.1 (28.2)
Mean daily minimum °C (°F)	−26.7 (−16.1)	−23.2 (−9.8)	−18.1 (−0.6)	−6.6 (20.1)	1.8 (35.2)	7.4 (45.3)	9.3 (48.7)	7.2 (45.0)	2.5 (36.5)	−4.5 (23.9)	−18.5 (−1.3)	−25.1 (−13.2)	−7.9 (17.8)
Record low °C (°F)	−58.9 (−74.0)	−56.2 (−69.2)	−46.7 (−52.1)	−32.8 (−27.0)	−16.0 (3.2)	−3.3 (26.1)	0.6 (33.1)	−6.7 (19.9)	−13.9 (7.0)	−36.6 (−33.9)	−47.5 (−53.5)	−53.3 (−63.9)	−58.9 (−74.0)
Record low wind chill	−66.4	−63.3	−51.4	−36.2	−16.4	−5.2	0.0	−5.4	−19.0	−42.7	−55.5	−63.6	−66.4
Average precipitation mm (inches)	33.4 (1.31)	18.0 (0.71)	15.4 (0.61)	14.7 (0.58)	28.6 (1.13)	56.1 (2.21)	58.1 (2.29)	50.4 (1.98)	45.7 (1.80)	35.4 (1.39)	30.7 (1.21)	30.6 (1.20)	417.1 (16.42)
Average rainfall mm (inches)	0.3 (0.01)	0.0 (0.0)	0.2 (0.01)	5.3 (0.21)	25.8 (1.02)	57.5 (2.26)	58 (2.3)	50.5 (1.99)	43.3 (1.70)	18.8 (0.74)	0.6 (0.02)	0.6 (0.02)	260.9 (10.27)
Average snowfall cm (inches)	41 (16)	24.4 (9.6)	17.8 (7.0)	12.0 (4.7)	3.5 (1.4)	0.0 (0.0)	0.0 (0.0)	0.2 (0.1)	1.4 (0.6)	20.6 (8.1)	36.1 (14.2)	40.2 (15.8)	197 (78)
Average precipitation days (≥ 0.2 mm)	13.9	10.2	10.2	6.2	10.4	12.8	14.6	13.9	14.8	13.4	15.7	14.4	150.4
Average rainy days (≥ 0.2 mm)	0.26	0.14	0.26	2.2	10.1	12.9	14.4	13.4	13.9	6.7	0.54	0.41	75.2
Average snowy days (≥ 0.2 cm)	14.1	9.9	9.2	4.5	1.4	0.0	0.0	0.17	0.92	7.5	15.3	14.5	77.4
Average relative humidity (%) (at 1500 LST)	76.3	74.8	60.3	46.7	40.1	44.1	48.1	49.9	56.0	69.1	80.5	78.2	60.3
Source: Environment and Climate Change Canada

== Ecology ==
Except for the coastal plain of the Arctic Ocean and high elevations, most of Yukon is in an ecoregion that forms part of the boreal forest of Canada. Most mountain peaks and higher elevations are characterized by Alpine tundra while the coastal plain is Arctic coastal tundra. More precisely, according to the ecozone definitions used by Environment and Climate Change Canada, southern and central Yukon is part of the Boreal Cordillera Ecozone while the northern forest is part of the Taiga Cordillera Ecozone. The Peel River area in the northeast is in the Taiga Plains Ecozone and the Arctic coast is in the Southern Arctic Ecozone.

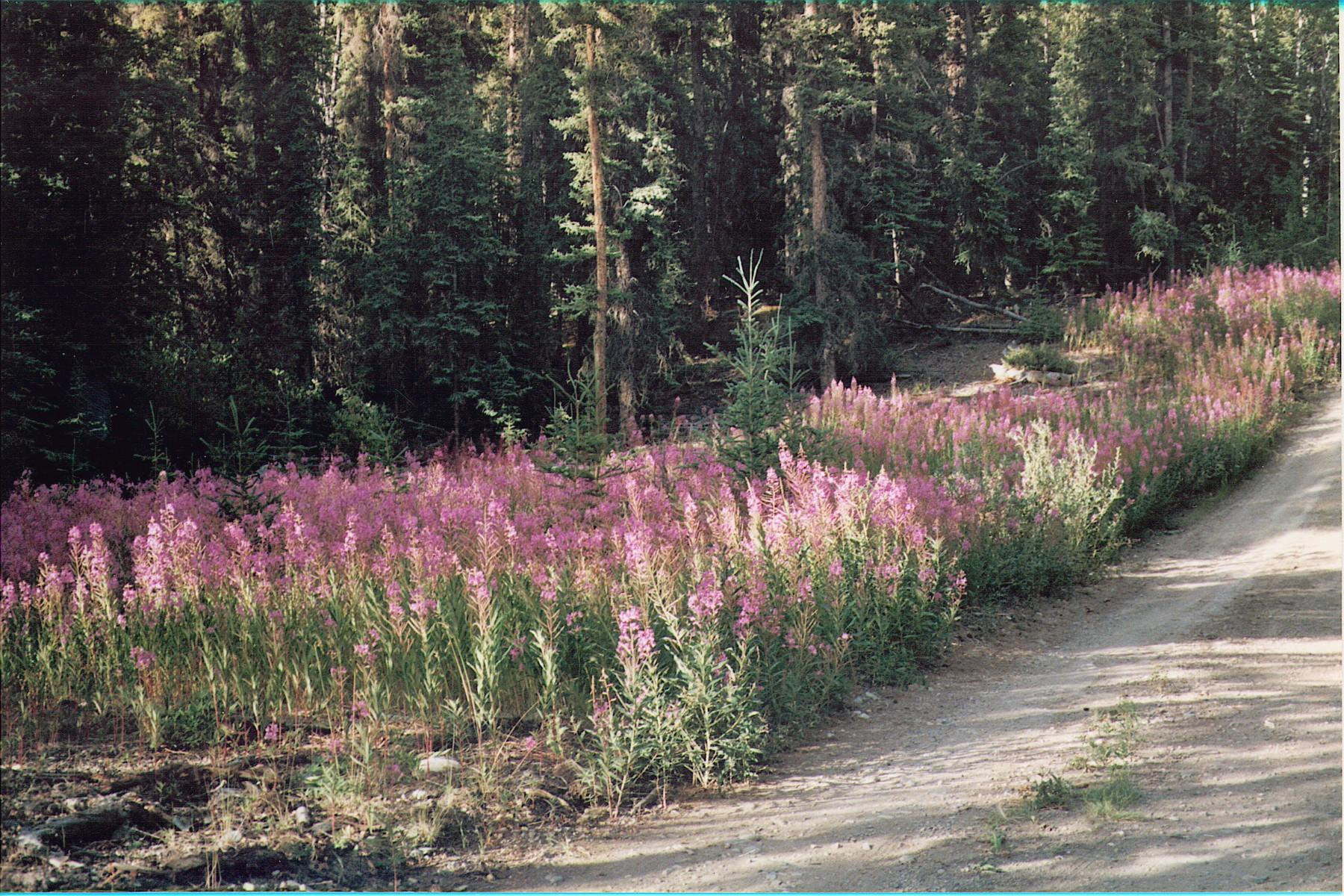
Fireweed (Epilobium angustifolium), Yukon's territorial flower and white spruce (Picea glauca) in southern Yukon near the South Klondike Highway.

=== Plants ===
Black spruce (Picea mariana), white spruce (Picea glauca), quaking aspen (Populus tremuloides) and balsam poplar (Populus balsamifera) are found throughout much of the territory. Although relatively uncommon, the Alaska birch (Betula neoalaskana) is also found in most areas. The lodgepole pine (Pinus contorta) reaches its northern extreme in the south-central part of the territory, while tamarack (Larix laricina) is found in the southeast and the subalpine fir (Abies lasiocarpa, the official tree) is found at higher elevations in the southern part of the territory. Fireweed (Epilobium angustifolium) is the territories official flower.

=== Animals ===
It is estimated that there are over 200,000 caribou (Rangifer tarandus) in 53 herds throughout Yukon. The barren-ground (Rangifer tarandus groenlandicus or Rangifer tarandus grantii), which includes the 169,000 strong Porcupine caribou herd (Rangifer arcticus arcticus). The woodland caribou (Rangifer tarandus caribou) are boreal woodland and northern mountain caribou as designated by the Committee on the Status of Endangered Wildlife in Canada.

Other large mammals include moose (Alces alces), wolves (Canis lupus), grizzly bears (Ursus arctos horribilis) and American black bears (Ursus americanus). Higher elevations have Dall sheep (also called thinhorn sheep, Ovis dalli) and, in the south, mountain goat (Oreamnos americanus). Polar bears (Ursus maritimus) are found on the Arctic coast. The mule deer (Odocoileus hermionus) and its predator, the cougar (Puma concolor), are becoming increasingly common in the south, and coyotes (Canis latrans) are increasing their range to the northern Yukon. Elk (Cervus canadensis) and wood bison (Bison bison athabascae) are also present.

There are many species of rodents, including red squirrels (Sciurus vulgaris), Arctic ground squirrel (Urocitellus parryii), northern flying squirrel (Glaucomys sabrinus), several species of lemmings, collared pikas (Ochotona collaris), North American beavers (Castor canadensis), various species of voles, North American porcupines (Erethizon dorsatum), muskrats (Ondatra zibethicus), etc. Mustelids are also well represented and include the wolverine (Gulo gulo), American marten (Martes americana), stoat (also called the ermine, Mustela erminea), least weasel (Mustela nivalis), American mink (Neogale vison), and the river otter (Lontra canadensis or Lutra canadensis). Other small carnivores present are the Canada lynx (Lynx canadensis), red fox ( Vulpes vulpes) and Arctic fox (Vulpes lagopus) along the northern coast.

More than 250 species of birds have been sighted in Yukon. The common raven (Corvus corax) is the territorial bird and is common everywhere. Other common resident birds include bald eagles (Haliaeetus leucocephalus), golden eagles (Aquila chrysaetos), gyrfalcon (Falco rusticolus) and peregrine falcon (Falco peregrinus), seven species of grouse (spruce (Canachites canadensis), dusky (Dendragapus obscurus), ruffed (Bonasa umbellus), sharp-tailed (Tympanuchus phasianellus), Willow ptarmigan (Lagopus lagopus), Rock ptarmigan (Lagopus muta), and white-tailed ptarmigan (Lagopus leucura)). Many migratory birds breed in the Yukon, as it is at the northern end of the Pacific Flyway.

Other than the burbot (Lota lota) and northern pike (Esox lucius), most of the large fish found in Yukon rivers, lakes and streams are salmonids. Four species of Pacific salmon (chinook (Oncorhynchus tshawytscha), chum (Oncorhynchus keta), coho (Oncorhynchus kisutch), and sockeye (Oncorhynchus nerka)) breed in Yukon rivers and lakes in the Pacific and Yukon River watersheds. The Yukon River has the longest freshwater migration route of any salmon; Chinook salmon swim over 3,000 km (1,900 mi) from its mouth in the Bering Sea to spawning grounds upstream of Whitehorse. There are also land-locked kokanee (Oncorhynchus nerka, a type of sockeye) and rainbow trout (Oncorhynchus mykiss). Char are represented by lake trout (Salvelinus namaycush) present in most large Yukon lakes, as well as Dolly Varden (Salvelinus malma), bull trout (Salvelinus confluentus) and Arctic char (Salvelinus alpinus). The Arctic grayling (Thymallus arcticus) is ubiquitous, while the lakes have various whitefish and inconnu (Stenodus leucichthys).

There are no reptiles in Yukon, but a few frogs such as the wood frog (Lithobates sylvaticus).

== Human geography ==
Yukon is sparsely populated, with 40,232 inhabitants (as of the 2021 census) in a territory almost as large as Spain or Sweden. Covering an area of 472,345.44 km^{2} (182,373.59 sq mi) the population density is 0.09/km^{2} (0.22/sq mi). Close to three quarters of the population is in the Whitehorse area, and the rest live in a number of other communities. All except Old Crow are accessible by road.

The capital, Whitehorse (2021 city population 28,201), is also the largest city with more than 70% of the population; the second largest is Dawson City, (2021 population 1,577) which was the capital until 1952.

Traditionally, Yukon was inhabited by nomadic Athapaskan-speaking First Nations people who had established extensive trading networks with the Pacific Coast Tlingit. The interior people traded copper, furs and meat for coastal products such as eulachon oil. About 20% of the Yukon population is of Indigenous origin.

There is no Inuit population in Yukon, although there was a population along the Arctic Ocean coast within historic times. The Inuit were decimated by disease and disappeared in the 19th century. In 1984, the Government of Canada included the Yukon North Slope within the Inuvialuit Settlement Region under the auspices of the Inuvialuit.

The following table, sorted alphabetically presents the population of most Yukon communities as listed by Statistics Canada.

Population of Yukon communities
Community	Census subdivision type	2021 census	2016 census	2011 census	% change (2016-2021)
Beaver Creek	Settlement	78	93	103	-16.1%
Burwash Landing	Settlement	64	72	95	-11.1%
Carcross (Note: Includes both the community and the adjoining reserve)	Settlement	317	301	289	5.3%
Carcross 4	Self-government	37	35	53	5.7%
Carmacks	Village	588	493	503	19.3%
Champagne Landing 10	Indian settlement	22	20	25	10.0%
Dawson City	Town	1,577	1,375	1,319	14.7%
Destruction Bay	Settlement	40	55	35	-27.3%
Faro	Town	440	348	344	26.4%
Haines Junction	Village	688	613	593	12.2%
Ibex Valley (Note: Part of the census agglomeration of Whitehorse)	Hamlet	523	411	346	27.3%
Johnsons Crossing	Settlement	10	10	15	0.0%
Keno Hill	Settlement	20	20	28	0.0%
Lake Laberge 1	Self-government	24	25	20	-4.0%
Macpherson-Grizzly Valley	Unorganized	1,540	1,245	1,072	23.7%
Marsh Lake	Unorganized	746	696	619	7.2%
Mayo	Village	188	200	226	-6.0%
Mount Lorne	Hamlet	468	437	408	7.1%
Old Crow	Settlement	236	221	245	6.8%
Pelly Crossing	Settlement	316	353	336	-10.5%
Ross River	Settlement	355	293	352	21.2%
Stewart Crossing	Settlement	10	17	25	-41.2%
Swift River	Settlement	5	0	0	
Tagish	Settlement	311	249	391	24.9%
Teslin	Village	239	255	122	-6.3%
Teslin Post 13	Self-government	19	30	138	-36.7%
Two Mile and Two and One-Half Mile Village	Indian settlement Dissolved census subdivision	162		203	
Upper Liard	Settlement	130	125	132	4.0%
Watson Lake	Town	1,133	1,083	802	4.6%
Whitehorse	Census agglomeration	31,913	28,225	26,028	13.1%
Whitehorse	City	28,201	25,085	23,276	12.4%
Whitehorse, Unorganized	Unorganized	411	326	287	26.1%
Yukon, Unorganized	Unorganized	1,496	1,388	1,495	7.8%
Total Yukon (Note: Figures from the Whitehorse census agglomeration are included separately)		40,394	35,874	33,897	12.1%

== Natural resources ==
Yukon has abundant mineral resources and mining was the mainstay of the economy until recently. Abundant gold was found in the Klondike region leading to the Klondike Gold Rush of 1898. Placer gold is found in many streams and rivers, and there is an active placer mining industry in the Klondike and many other parts of Yukon to this day.

Other minerals that have been actively mined include copper in the Whitehorse area, lead and zinc in Faro, silver, zinc and lead in the Mayo / Keno City area, asbestos in Clinton Creek, and copper, gold, and coal in the Carmacks area. The world's largest known deposit of tungsten is in the Macmillan Pass area in the Mackenzie Mountains near the Northwest Territories border. Non-metallic minerals mined have included jade and barite. Lazulite, a semi-precious gemstone and the territories official gemstone, occurs in northern Yukon, about 32 km (20 mi) south of the Beaufort Sea.

The fur trade was very important to the economy of Indigenous peoples in Yukon, but low prices and the impact of the animal rights movement has devastated the traditional economy.

There are four hydroelectric generating stations in Yukon. Three operated by Yukon Energy; one at Aishihik Lake, one at Mayo and a third at what used to be the White Horse Rapids that were submerged by the damming of Yukon River to create Schwatka Lake near Whitehorse. The fourth is operated by Yukon Electrical at Fish Lake

While Yukon is mostly covered with forests, most of the trees are small and take a long time to grow and regenerate because of the dry cold climate. There is a considerable amount of small scale logging, but the only area that can sustain industrial forestry is in the southeast with its wetter climate. However, distance from markets and fluctuating prices have resulted in a boom-and-bust industry.

A small amount of natural gas is currently produced in the southeast, but little exploration has been done in other parts of the Yukon. It is believed that there are abundant natural gas fields in the Eagle Plains area along the Dempster Highway and possibly in the Whitehorse area, but distance from pipelines has hampered exploration.

== Environmental issues ==
Climate change is affecting the north more than other parts of the world and Yukon is no exception. While residents might welcome warmer temperatures, the ultimate effects are not known. Higher temperatures would mean more evaporation and drying out an already dry climate, resulting in more forest fires and reducing the biological productivity of boreal forests, whose growth is limited more by lack of moisture than temperature. Also glaciers are likely to melt, and permafrost likely to thaw.

Yukon is also the recipient of airborne pollutants from other parts of the world, especially persistent organic pollutants. Consumption of the liver of certain wild animals and fish is no longer recommended because of these.

Locally, mine reclamation and dealing with mine tailings that cause acid mine drainage left over from mine closures is a major problem and is likely to cost hundreds of millions of dollars to clean up.

In an effort to encourage natural resource exploration, the previous (2002–2011) Yukon Party government led by Dennis Fentie has suspended the application of the Protected Areas Strategy (established by a previous Yukon New Democratic Party government) and has indicated its intention of not creating additional protected areas or parks.

The Gwichʼin people of Old Crow are dependent on the Porcupine caribou herd for food and clothing, as are others in the Yukon. The Porcupine caribou herd migrates to the coastal plain in the Arctic National Wildlife Refuge (ANWR) in Alaska to give birth. That herd may be seriously threatened by oil-drilling in the ANWR.

== See also ==
- Geology of Yukon
