= Mount Atherton =

Mountain in the Yukon, Canada

- Location within Yukon

Highest point
- Elevation: 1,267 m (4,157 ft)
- Parent peak: Mount Patterson (9.9 km away, at bearing 170 degrees). Mount Atherton is the highpoint of a ridge in the northern Pelly Mountains in south-central Yukon.
- Coordinates: 62°01′44″N 133°53′39″W

Geography
- Location: Yukon, Canada
- Parent range: Pelly Mountains
- Topo map: NTS 105K4 Mount Atherton

Climbing
- Easiest route: The Robert Campbell Highway to the north offers access.

Mount Atherton is a mountain in Canada. It is located in the province of Yukon, in the western part of the country, 4,100 km west of the capital Ottawa. The peak of Mount Atherton is 1,892 metres above sea level, or 625 metres above the surrounding terrain. The width at the base is 12.2 km. It was named after Charles Thomas Atherton, who succeeded Deacon Phelps as a member of the Yukon Territorial Council, representing Whitehorse from 1934 to 1937.

Mount Atherton is part of the Saint Cyr Range, a remote mountain range in the Yukon, Canada. It has an area of 6224 km^{2} and is a subrange of the Pelly Mountains which in turn form part of the Yukon Ranges. Bivouac, the Canadian Mountain Encyclopedia refers to Mount Atherton being 1905m (6250 feet) with a prominence of 550m.

The terrain around Mount Atherton is mainly hilly, but to the southeast it is mountainous. The highest point nearby is 2,130 metres above sea level, 8.8 km east of Mount Atherton. The area around Mount Atherton is almost uninhabited, with less than two inhabitants per km^{2}. There are no communities nearby. The closest town is Faro, Yukon.

Mount Atherton, Yukon, Canada.

The area around Mount Atherton is essentially an open bush landscape. The area is part of the Subarctic climate or boreal climate zone. The average annual temperature in the area is −7 °C (19 °F). The warmest month is July, when the average temperature is 8 °C (46 °F), and the coldest is December, with −18 °C (0 °F).

== Maps ==
- Administrative Boundaries Tay River 105K
- Geoscience Map (General): Data Geology Reference Number:ARMC018806: Title Field map - Mount Atherton - 105K/4
- Topographical map of Mount Atherton
- Geological maps of Mount Atherton and surrounding area
  - Geology of Mt. Atherton [105K/4]
  - Maps of adjacent mountains: Rose Mountain [105K/5], and Mount Mye [105K/6]
- The Atlas of Canada - Toporama
- Topography of Mount Atherton

== Yukon Sources ==
- Yukon books:Topography of Yukon
- Yukon Place Names: Mount Atherton

== Canadian Government Sources ==
- Geoscan - Canada, National Topographic System Maps 105K/4, 1973, 1 sheet (Open Access): Data sheet of Mount Atherton, Yukon, Canada
- Geoscan: Government of Canada map of Mount Atherton
- Geoscan Home Page (in event of links break)
