= Glen Lyon (disambiguation) =

Glen Lyon is a glen in the Perth and Kinross area of Scotland.

Glen Lyon or Glenlyon may also refer to:

== Places and structures ==
- Glen Lyon, Pennsylvania, US
- Glenlyon, Queensland, Australia
- Glenlyon, Victoria, Australia
- Glen Lyon, Ashgrove, a heritage-listed house in Brisbane, Queensland, Australia
- Glenlyon Dam, Queensland, Australia
- Glenlyon Range, a mountain range in the Yukon, Canada

== Ships ==
- Glen Lyon (ship), a South Korean FPSO vessel
- SS Glenlyon, a freighter built in 1893

== Other uses ==
- Glen Lyon (album), a 2002 album by Martyn Bennett
- Glenlyon Campbell (1863–1917), Canadian politician
