= Gray Peak (Yukon) =

Mountain in Yukon, Canada

Highest point
- Elevation: 2,174 m (7,133 ft)
- Prominence: 1,364 m (4,475 ft)
- Coordinates: 61°10′43.2″N 133°37′01.8″W

Geography
- Location: Yukon, Canada
- Parent range: Big Salmon Range
- Topo map: NTS 105F4 Falls Creek

Gray Peak is the unofficial name for the highest mountain of the Big Salmon Range in south-central Yukon, Canada, located 79 km (49 mi) north of Johnson's Crossing and 84 km (52 mi) south of Fox Mountain.
