= Nahoni Range =

Mountain range in Yukon, Canada

- Location within Yukon

Geography
- Country: Canada
- Region: Yukon
- Parent range: Ogilvie Mountains

The Nahoni Range is a mountain range in the Yukon, Canada. It has an area of 4535 km^{2} and is a subrange of the Ogilvie Mountains which in turn form part of the Yukon Ranges.

== See also ==
- List of mountain ranges
