= Upper Becker Creek Cone =

Volcanic cone in Carbon Hill, Yukon, Canada

The Upper Becker Creek Cone is a volcanic cone, located in the Upper Becker Creek area of Carbon Hill, Yukon, Canada. It was formed during the Tertiary eruptions of the Skukum Group.

== See also ==
- Volcanism of Northern Canada
- List of volcanoes of Canada
