= Glen Lyon (ship) =

The Glen Lyon is a 100,000-tonne, 880-ft-long floating production, storage and offloading vessel (FPSO). The ship was built in South Korea and is anchored to the seabed at the Schiehallion and Loyal oil fields in the North Sea in waters 1,300ft deep.

According to BP, it is the largest "harsh-water" FPSO ship in the world.
