= Big Salmon Range =

Mountain range in Canada

- Location within Yukon

Highest point
- Peak: Gray Peak
- Elevation: 2,174 m (7,133 ft)
- Coordinates: 61°10′43.2″N 133°37′01.8″W

Geography
- Country: Canada
- Region: Yukon
- Parent range: Pelly Mountains

The Big Salmon Range is a remote mountain range in the Yukon, Canada. It has an area of 9,001 km^{2} (3,475 sq mi) and is a subrange of the Pelly Mountains which in turn form part of the Yukon Ranges. Most of its peaks are unnamed.

== See also ==
- List of mountain ranges
