= Selwyn Mountains =

Mountain range in northern Canada

- Location within Northwest Territories Location within Yukon Location within Canada

Highest point
- Peak: Keele Peak
- Elevation: 2,952 m (9,685 ft)
- Coordinates: 63°25′53″N 130°19′26″W

Geography
- Country: Canada
- Territories: Yukon and Northwest Territories
- Range coordinates: 62°51′07″N 130°08′58″W

The Selwyn Mountains are a mountain range in northern Canada, forming part of the border between the Yukon Territory and the Northwest Territories, and which are part of the Eastern System of the Canadian Cordillera (a.k.a. the Western Cordillera). They are neighboured on the east by the Mackenzie Mountains and on their northwest end by the Brooks Range. To their southwest is the Yukon Plateau, while a lower southward extension of their mountain spine protrudes into British Columbia as the Liard Plateau. In some reckonings the Selwyns and Mackenzies are considered to be part of the Rocky Mountains, but that range officially lies only to the south of the Liard River and the aforesaid plateau. Named for Alfred Richard Cecil Selwyn, director of the Geological Survey of Victoria from 1852 to 1869, director of the Geological Survey of Canada (GSC) from 1869 to 1894 and President of the Royal Society of Canada from 1895 to 1896.
