= Saint Cyr Range =

Mountain range in Yukon, Canada

- Location within Yukon

Geography
- Country: Canada
- Region: Yukon
- Parent range: Pelly Mountains

The Saint Cyr Range is a remote mountain range in the Yukon, Canada. It has an area of 6224 km^{2} and is a subrange of the Pelly Mountains which in turn form part of the Yukon Ranges.

== See also ==
- List of mountain ranges
- Mount Atherton [105K/4]
- Rose Mountain [105K/5]
- Mount Mye [105K/6]
