= Pelly Mountains =

Mountain range in Yukon, Canada

- Location within Yukon

Highest point
- Peak: Fox Mountain
- Elevation: 2,404 m (7,887 ft)
- Prominence: 1,404 m (4,606 ft)
- Coordinates: 61°54′53″N 133°20′43″W

Geography
- Country: Canada
- Territory: Yukon
- Range coordinates: 61°41′28″N 133°31′13″W
- Parent range: Yukon Ranges

The Pelly Mountains are a mountain range in the Yukon, Canada. It has an area of 44,014 km^{2} (16,994 sq mi) and is a subrange of the Yukon Ranges which in turn form part of the Pacific Coast Ranges.

== Sub-ranges ==
- Big Salmon Range
- Glenlyon Range
- Saint Cyr Range

== See also ==
- List of mountain ranges
