= Yukon Ranges =

Mountain ranges in Alaska, US, and Yukon, Canada

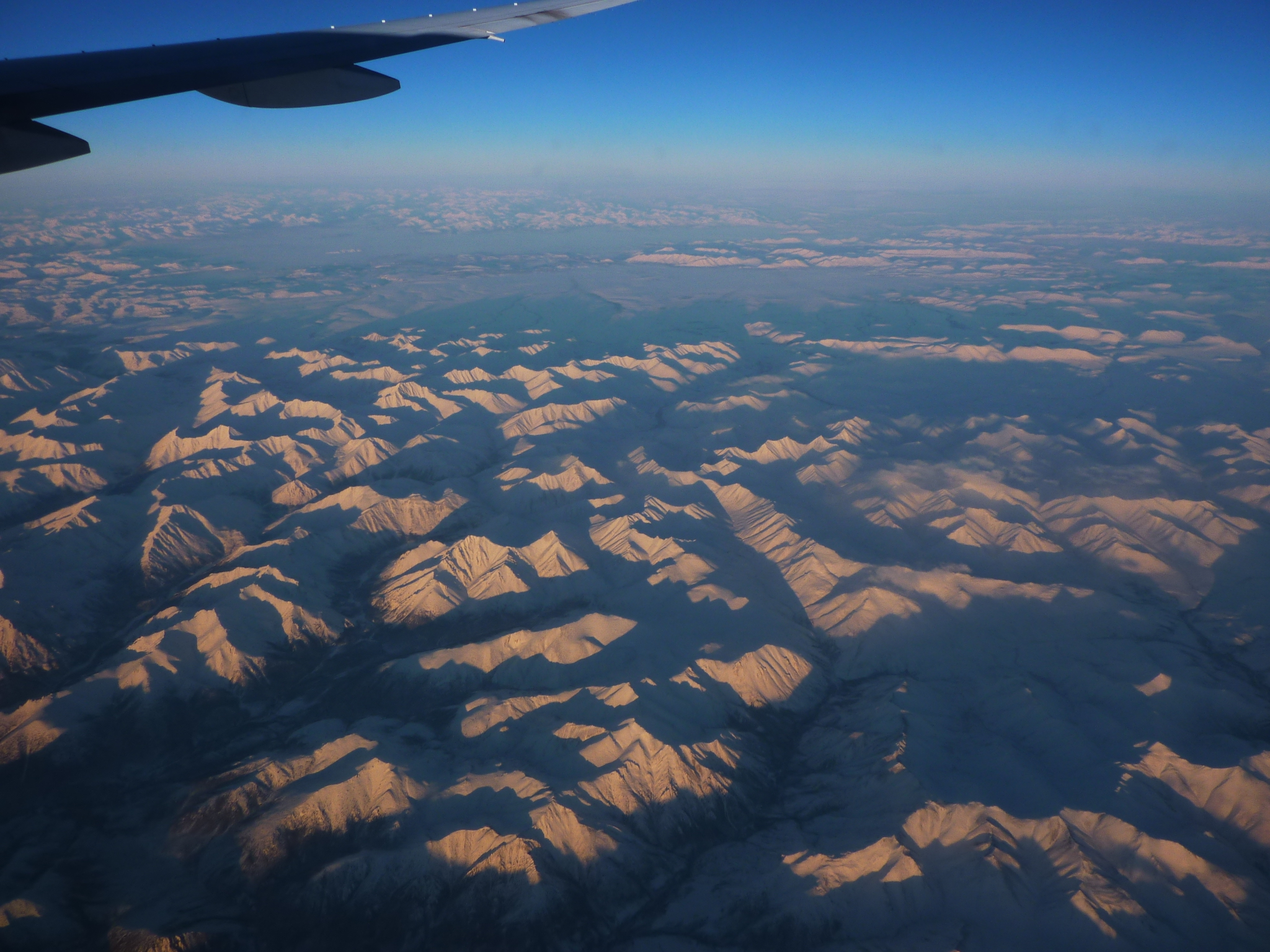
- Ogilvie Mountains, with Mount Gibben near the center. Looking north

Dimensions
- Area: 364,710 km^{2} (140,820 mi^{2})

Geography
- Countries: Canada and United States
- Provinces/States: Yukon and Alaska
- Parent range: Interior System

The Yukon Ranges are a mountain range comprising the mountains in the southeastern part of the U.S. state of Alaska and most of the Yukon in Canada. Named after the Yukon, this range has area of 364,710 square kilometres (140,820 sq mi).

== Sub-ranges ==
- Anvil Range
- Dawson Range
- Miners Range
- Nisling Range
- Ogilvie Mountains
  - Nahoni Range
- Pelly Mountains
  - Big Salmon Range
  - Glenlyon Range
  - Saint Cyr Range
- Wrangell Mountains
- Ruby Range
