= British Mountains =

Canadian mountain range

Highest point
- Elevation: 553 m (1,814 feet)
- Coordinates: 68.99962°N 140.50533°W

Geography
- Country: Canada
- Province: Yukon
- Parent range: Brooks Range

The British Mountains are a mountain range in Yukon, Canada. It is generally defined as the section of the Brooks Range within Canada.

The range is home to Ivvavik National Park.
