= Glenlyon Range =

Mountain range in Yukon, Canada

- Location within Yukon

Highest point
- Coordinates: 62°24′19.4″N 134°19′23.2″W

Geography
- Country: Canada
- Region: Yukon
- Parent range: Pelly Mountains

The Glenlyon Range is a mountain range in the Yukon, Canada. It has an area of 2589 km^{2} and is a subrange of the Pelly Mountains which in turn form part of the Yukon Ranges.

== See also ==
- List of mountain ranges
