= List of provincial parks of British Columbia Northern Interior =

The list of provincial parks of the British Columbia Northern Interior contains the provincial parks located within this geographic region of the province of British Columbia. It includes parks from the three regional districts of Northern Rockies, Peace River and Stikine. These parks are administered by BC Parks under the jurisdiction of the Ministry of Environment and Climate Change Strategy.

== List of parks ==
Park name	Classification	Regional districts	Coordinates	Size		Established	Remarks
Park name	Classification	Regional districts	Coordinates	ha	acres	Established	Remarks
Andy Bailey Provincial Park	Provincial Park	Northern Rockies; 58°33′N 122°30′W	58°33′N 122°30′W				
Atlin Provincial Park and Recreation Area	Provincial Park	Stikine Region	59°31′21″N 133°45′36″W				
Bearhole Lake Provincial Park	Provincial Park	Peace River	55°02′50″N 120°33′00″W				
Beatton Provincial Park	Provincial Park	Peace River	56°20′00″N 120°55′59″W				
Beatton River Provincial Park	Provincial Park	Peace River	56°06′00″N 120°22′30″W				
Bocock Peak Provincial Park	Provincial Park	Peace River	55°51′00″N 122°55′59″W				
Boya Lake Provincial Park	Provincial Park	Stikine Region	59°23′00″N 129°04′59″W				
Buckinghorse River Wayside Provincial Park	Provincial Park	Peace River	57°23′00″N 122°49′59″W				
Butler Ridge Provincial Park	Provincial Park	Peace River	56°11′00″N 122°18′00″W				
Charlie Lake Provincial Park	Provincial Park	Peace River	56°18′30″N 120°59′46″W				
Chase Provincial Park	Provincial Park	Peace River	56°30′30″N 125°01′44″W				
Dall River Old Growth Provincial Park	Provincial Park	Stikine Region	58°39′N 127°42′W				
Denetiah Provincial Park	Provincial Park	Stikine Region	58°30′00″N 127°25′01″W				
Dune Za Keyih Provincial Park and Protected Area	Provincial Park; Protected Area	Stikine Region	58°25′00″N 126°19′59″W				
East Pine Provincial Park	Provincial Park	Peace River	55°43′00″N 121°13′01″W				
Ed Bird – Estella Lakes Provincial Park	Provincial Park	Peace River	56°56′02″N 125°05′49″W				
Finlay-Russel Provincial Park and Protected Area	Provincial Park; Protected Area	Peace River	57°32′00″N 126°10′01″W				
Graham-Laurier Provincial Park	Provincial Park	Peace River	56°38′00″N 123°30′00″W				
Gwillim Lake Provincial Park	Provincial Park	Peace River	55°25′59″N 121°13′59″W				
Hole-in-the-Wall Provincial Park	Provincial Park	Peace River	55°08′46″N 121°51′14″W				
Horneline Creek Provincial Park	Provincial Park	Stikine Region	59°00′N 127°15′W				
Hyland River Provincial Park	Provincial Park	Stikine Region	59°57′39″N 128°09′08″W				
Jackpine Remnant Provincial Park	Provincial Park	Northern Rockies	59°10′N 123°17′W				
Kiskatinaw Provincial Park	Provincial Park	Peace River	55°58′N 120°34′W				
Kotcho Lake Village Provincial Park	Provincial Park	Northern Rockies	59°01′21″N 121°05′02″W				
Kwadacha Wilderness Provincial Park	Provincial Park	Peace River	57°48′00″N 125°07′01″W				
Liard River Corridor Provincial Park	Provincial Park	Northern Rockies	59°18′00″N 125°22′59″W				
Liard River Hot Springs Provincial Park	Provincial Park	Northern Rockies	59°24′00″N 126°04′01″W				
Maxhamish Lake Provincial Park and Protected Area	Provincial Park; Protected Area	Northern Rockies	59°49′34″N 123°16′34″W				
Milligan Hills Provincial Park	Provincial Park	Peace River	57°29′35″N 120°13′50″W				
Moberly Lake Provincial Park	Provincial Park	Peace River	55°48′29″N 121°41′38″W				
Monkman Provincial Park	Provincial Park	Peace River	54°36′00″N 121°10′59″W				
Muncho Lake Provincial Park	Provincial Park	Northern Rockies	59°10′00″N 126°01′01″W				
Muscovite Lakes Provincial Park	Provincial Park	Peace River	55°58′40″N 124°08′45″W				
Northern Rocky Mountains Provincial Park	Provincial Park	Northern Rockies	58°11′29″N 124°21′49″W				
One Island Lake Provincial Park	Provincial Park	Peace River	55°18′26″N 120°17′35″W				
Peace River Corridor Provincial Park	Provincial Park	Peace River	56°06′10″N 120°13′19″W				
Pine Le Moray Provincial Park	Provincial Park	Peace River	55°23′31″N 122°31′08″W				
Pine River Breaks Provincial Park	Provincial Park	Peace River	55°41′00″N 121°22′01″W				
Pink Mountain Provincial Park	Provincial Park	Peace River	57°02′40″N 122°52′23″W				
Prophet River Hotsprings Provincial Park	Provincial Park	Peace River	57°39′05″N 124°01′41″W				
Prophet River Wayside Provincial Park	Provincial Park	Peace River	57°58′00″N 122°46′59″W				
Redfern-Keily Provincial Park	Provincial Park	Peace River	57°26′00″N 123°57′00″W				
Scatter River Old Growth Provincial Park	Provincial Park	Northern Rockies	59°37′35″N 124°39′00″W				
Sikanni Old Growth Provincial Park	Provincial Park	Northern Rockies	58°14′23″N 121°42′57″W				
Smith River Falls – Fort Halkett Provincial Park	Provincial Park	Northern Rockies	59°33′30″N 126°28′06″W				
Spatsizi Plateau Wilderness Provincial Park	Provincial Park	Stikine Region	57°25′00″N 128°30′00″W				
Stikine River Provincial Park	Provincial Park	Stikine Region	57°55′59″N 129°00′00″W				
Stone Mountain Provincial Park	Provincial Park	Northern Rockies	58°35′00″N 124°45′00″W				
Sukunka Falls Provincial Park	Provincial Park	Peace River	55°19′45″N 121°43′17″W				
Sustut Provincial Park	Provincial Park	Stikine Region	56°22′37″N 126°41′55″W				
Swan Lake Provincial Park	Provincial Park	Peace River	55°31′37″N 120°01′48″W				
Tatlatui Provincial Park	Provincial Park	Peace River	56°58′00″N 127°22′59″W				
Tatshenshini-Alsek Provincial Park	Provincial Park	Stikine Region	59°27′22″N 137°36′53″W				
Taylor Landing Provincial Park	Provincial Park	Peace River	56°08′05″N 120°39′58″W				
Tetsa River Provincial Park	Provincial Park	Northern Rockies	58°39′N 123°57′W				
Toad River Hot Springs Provincial Park	Provincial Park	Northern Rockies	58°55′00″N 125°04′01″W				
Tuya Mountains Provincial Park	Provincial Park	Stikine Region	59°10′19″N 130°30′00″W				
Wapiti Lake Provincial Park	Provincial Park	Peace River	54°30′59″N 120°46′30″W				
