= Fusilier Peak =

Mountain in British Columbia, Canada

- Location within British Columbia
- Interactive map of Fusilier Peak

Highest point
- Elevation: 2,747 m (9,012 ft)
- Prominence: 262 m (860 ft)
- Parent peak: Constable Peak
- Listing: Mountains of British Columbia
- Coordinates: 58°20′47″N 124°51′43″W

Geography
- Country: Canada
- Province: British Columbia
- District: Peace River Land District
- Parent range: Tower of London Range
- Topo map: NTS 94K7 Wokkpash Lake

Fusilier Peak is a 2,747-metre (9,012 ft) peak in British Columbia, Canada. Its line parent is Constable Peak, 2 kilometres (1.2 mi) away. It is part of the Tower of London Range of the Muskwa Ranges in the Canadian Rockies.

Fusilier Peak was named by the Royal Fusiliers (City of London Regiment) Canadian Rocky Mountains Expedition 1960, a small expedition with members from a regiment based in the Tower of London. The expedition named several peaks after the Tower, including The White Tower, North Bastion Mountain, South Bastion Mountain and Tower Mountain, which overlooks the south end of Wokkpash Lake.

== Sources ==
- Nash, Mike (2004-05-01). Exploring Prince George: A Guide to North Central B. C. Outdoors. Rocky Mountain Books Ltd. ISBN 978-1-894765-49-7.
- "Fusilier Peak, British Columbia". Bivouac.com.
- "Fusilier Peak". Geographical Names Data Base. Natural Resources Canada.
