= Prophet River =

Location
- Country: Canada
- Province: British Columbia
- District: Peace River Land District

Physical characteristics
- Source
  - location: Muskwa Ranges
  - coordinates: 57.56166°N 124.39861°W
  - elevation: 2,000 meters (6,600 ft)
- Mouth
  - location: Muskwa River near Fort Nelson
  - coordinates: 58.76200°N 122.73952°W
  - elevation: 305 meters (1,001 ft)

The Prophet River is a river in northern British Columbia, Canada. It is a tributary of the Muskwa River.

The Prophet River Hotsprings Provincial Park is established on the upper course, and the Prophet River Wayside Provincial Park is located along the middle course of the river. It gives the name to the settlement of Prophet River, British Columbia, as well as the Prophet Formation, a stratigraphic unit of the Western Canadian Sedimentary Basin.

== Course ==
The headwaters of the Prophet River can be found in the Bruce Ridge of the Muskwa Ranges in the Northern Rockies, at an elevation of 2,000 meters (6,600 ft). It flows eastwards between the Northern Rocky Mountains Provincial Park and the Redfern-Keily Provincial Park, with occasional waterfalls on its course. The remote Prophet River Hotsprings Provincial Park is established on the upper course of the river. It receives the waters from Hewer Creek north of Mount Boe, then from Kravac Creek and Richards Creek towards the foothills. North of Klingzut Mountain it receives the Besa River just before flowing from the mountains into the plains

The Milliken Creek and Bat Creek flow into the Prophet River east of the Rocky Mountains. The course changes towards north-east, as it receives water from Minaker River, Bunch Creek, Dethseda Creek, Chipesia Creek and Sass Creek. The river turns north as it flows through the Prophet River Wayside Provincial Park, and is followed by the Alaska Highway for a while. Streams that flow into the river in this section include the Bougie Creek, Adsett Creek, Jacknife Creek, Parker Creek and Little Beaver Creek as it flows through the Sikanni Forest. The course becomes meandered, and the Tenaka Creek, Big Beaver Creek, Cheves Creek, Tsachehdza Creek and Jackfish Creek flow into the Prophet River. It then flows into the Muskwa River immediately west of Fort Nelson, at an elevation of 304 meters (997 ft).

The Muskwa River flows into the Fort Nelson River, a tributary of the Liard River, which carries the waters into the Mackenzie River and ultimately in the Arctic Ocean.

== Tributaries ==
- Hewer Creek
- Kravac Creek
- Richards Creek
- Besa River
- Milliken Creek
- Bat Creek
- Minaker River
- Bunch Creek
- Dethseda Creek
- Chipesia Creek
- Sass Creek
- Bougie Creek
- Adsett Creek
- Jacknife Creek
- Parker Creek
- Little Beaver Creek
- Tenaka Creek
- Big Beaver Creek
- Cheves Creek
- Tsachehdza Creek
- Jackfish Creek

== See also ==
- List of rivers of British Columbia
