= Constable Peak =

Mountain in British Columbia, Canada

- Location within British Columbia
- Interactive map of Constable Peak

Highest point
- Elevation: 2,824 m (9,265 ft)
- Prominence: 844 m (2,769 ft)
- Parent peak: King Peak (2848 m)
- Listing: Mountains of British Columbia
- Coordinates: 58°21′40″N 124°50′25″W

Geography
- Country: Canada
- Province: British Columbia
- District: Peace River Land District
- Parent range: Tower of London Range
- Topo map: NTS 94K7 Wokkpash Lake

Constable Peak is a 2,824-metre (9,265 ft) peak in British Columbia, Canada, rising to a prominence of 844 metres (2,769 ft) above Racing-Tuchodi Pass. Its line parent is King Peak, 15 kilometres (9.3 mi) away. It is part of the Tower of London Range of the Muskwa Ranges in the Canadian Rockies.

Constable Peak was named by the Royal Fusiliers (City of London Regiment) Canadian Rocky Mountains Expedition 1960, a small expedition with members from a regiment based in the Tower of London. The expedition named several peaks after the Tower, including The White Tower, North Bastion Mountain, South Bastion Mountain and Tower Mountain, which overlooks the south end of Wokkpash Lake. Constable Peak is named for the Constable of the Tower of London. The name was officially recognized on 2 March 1961.
