= Mount Smythe (British Columbia) =

Mountain in British Columbia, Canada

- Location within British Columbia Location within Canada

Highest point
- Elevation: 2,759 m (9,052 ft)
- Prominence: 420 m (1,380 ft)
- Parent peak: Criccieth Mountain (2858 m)
- Listing: Mountains of British Columbia
- Coordinates: 57°54′13″N 124°53′03″W

Geography
- Country: Canada
- Province: British Columbia
- District: Peace River Land District
- Parent range: Muskwa Ranges
- Topo map: NTS 94F15 Mount Lloyd George

Mount Smythe is a mountain located between the headwaters of Tuchodi and Warneford Rivers, on the boundary between Kwadacha Wilderness Provincial Park and Northern Rocky Mountains Provincial Park, SW of Fort Nelson, British Columbia.
