= Besa River =

Location
- Country: Canada
- Province: British Columbia
- District: Peace River Land District

Physical characteristics
- Source
  - location: Great Snow Mountain, Muskwa Ranges
  - coordinates: 57.43711°N 124.07185°W
  - elevation: 2,200 meters (7,200 ft)
- Mouth
  - location: Prophet River
  - coordinates: 57.66270°N 123.29820°W
  - elevation: 820 meters (2,690 ft)

Besa River is a river in northern British Columbia, Canada. It is a tributary of the Prophet River.

The river flows through the Muskwa Ranges, and is the backbone of the Redfern-Keily Provincial Park, part of the larger Muskwa-Kechika Management Area. It gives the name to the Besa River Formation, a stratigraphical unit of the Western Canadian Sedimentary Basin.

== Course ==
The Besa River headwaters are found high in the Muskwa Ranges of the Northern Rockies, on the slopes of the Great Snow Mountain, Great Rock Peak, Mount Circe and Mount Eurylochos, where it draws water from glaciers such as the Ithaca Glacier. The river flows eastwards through the Redfern-Keily Provincial Park, established along the upper course of the Besa River and its tributaries. It flows east and south-east, between the peaks of Redfern Mountain to the north and Mount Ulysses and Mount Penelope to the south, receiving waters from the Achaean Glacier. It then flows through the Redfern Lake, then turns north around Mount Dopp, after receiving the waters of Fairy Lake and Nordling Creek. The Petrie Creek and Keily Creek also flow into the Besa River, which then turns east, then north again after receiving the Neves Creek. Granger Creek also flows in the Besa River west of Klingzut Mountain. Shortly after, Besa River flows into the Prophet River as a right tributary, at an elevation of 820 meters (2,690 ft).

Its waters are carried via the Prophet River, Muskwa River, Fort Nelson River, Liard River and Mackenzie River, ultimately into the Arctic Ocean.

== Tributaries ==
- Ithaca Glacier
- Achaean Glacier
- Redfern Lake
- Fairy Lake
- Nordling Creek
- Petrie Creek
- Keily Creek
- Neves Creek
- Granger Creek

== See also ==
- List of rivers of British Columbia
