= South Bastion Mountain =

Mountain in British Columbia, Canada

- Location within British Columbia Location within Canada
- Interactive map of South Bastion Mountain

Highest point
- Elevation: 2,664 m (8,740 ft)
- Prominence: 154 m (505 ft)
- Parent peak: Develin Peak
- Listing: Mountains of British Columbia
- Coordinates: 58°17′47″N 124°45′42″W

Geography
- Country: Canada
- Province: British Columbia
- District: Peace River Land District
- Protected area: Northern Rocky Mountains Provincial Park
- Parent range: Tower of London Range
- Topo map: NTS 94K7 Wokkpash Lake

South Bastion Mountain is a 2,664-metre (8,740 ft) peak in British Columbia, Canada. Its line parent is Develin Peak, 1 kilometre (0.62 mi) away. It is part of the Tower of London Range of the Muskwa Ranges, in the Canadian Rockies.

South Bastion Mountain is named after the South Bastion of the Tower of London. Other mountains in the area are also named after the tower, including North Bastion Mountain, The White Tower, and Tower Mountain, which overlooks the south end of Wokkpash Lake. These names were given by the Royal Fusiliers (City of London Regiment) Canadian Rocky Mountains Expedition 1960, a small expedition with members from a regiment based in the Tower of London. Other nearby peaks include Angle Peak, Mount Peck, Devereux Peak, and Icecap Peak.
