= Battle of Britain Range =

Mountain range in British Columbia, Canada

- Location within British Columbia Location within Canada

Highest point
- Peak: Churchill Peak
- Elevation: 2,770 m (9,090 ft)
- Prominence: 745 m (2,444 ft)
- Listing: Mountains of British Columbia
- Coordinates: 58°14′34″N 125°11′57″W

Geography
- Country: Canada
- Province: British Columbia
- Range coordinates: 58°14′59″N 125°05′06″W
- Parent range: Muskwa Ranges; Canadian Rockies
- Topo map(s): NTS 94K3 Churchill Peak; NTS 94K6 Normandy Mountain

The Battle of Britain Range is a group of mountains within the Allies Group of the Muskwa Ranges in northern British Columbia, Canada. The Muskwa Ranges also include the Tower of London Range, Italy Range and Allied Leaders Range.

The range trends from northeast to southwest. About 37 square kilometres (14 sq mi) of the range is covered by glaciers, which lie in the basins of the Churchill Creek, Racing River and Gataga River. Major peaks include the Churchill Peak, Exploration Peak and Lindisfarne Peak. The names of the peaks commemorate the allied leaders in World War II, places where the leaders met, and battles in which Canadian troops served. Thus names include Mount Churchill, Mount Roosevelt, Teheran Mountain, Yalta Peak, Dieppe Mountain, Falaise Mountain and Ortona Mountain.

== See also ==
- Ranges of the Canadian Rockies
