= Prophet River Hotsprings Provincial Park =

Provincial park and thermal springs in British Columbia, Canada

Prophet River Hot Springs Provincial Park
- IUCN category II (national park)
- Location within British Columbia
- Interactive map of Prophet River Hot Springs Provincial Park
- Location: British Columbia, Canada
- Nearest city: Fort St. John
- Coordinates: 57°39′10″N 124°01′34″W
- Area: 1.84 km^{2} (0.71 sq mi)
- Established: June 28, 1999
- Governing body: BC Parks

Prophet River Hot Springs Provincial Park is a provincial park in British Columbia, Canada. Established high in the Muskwa Ranges, on the course of the Prophet River, it is part of the larger Muskwa-Kechika Management Area.

== Accessibility ==
The wilderness park covers 457 acres (185 hectares). The hot mineral springs have formed a tufa mound. The park can only be reached by hiking or horseback; there is no road access available. A hiking and horseback riding trail connects Prophet River Park to the nearby Redfern-Keily Provincial Park.

== Facilities ==
Backcountry camping is allowed, but the campsites offered are used on a first-come, first-serve basis. There are no facilities available in the park area.

== History ==
The park is located within a tract of land that is traditionally used by Treaty 8 First Nations people. Within the park boundaries an archaeological site exists.

== See also ==
- Prophet River Wayside Provincial Park
- List of hot springs
- List of British Columbia provincial parks
