= North Bastion =

North Bastion usually refers to a bastion at the north of a fortification. It may be used for:

- North Bastion, Gibraltar, a bastion at the northwest corner of the old town of Gibraltar
- North Bastion Mountain, a mountain in British Columbia, Canada named after the north bastion of the Tower of London
