= Tower Mountain (British Columbia) =

Mountain in British Columbia, Canada

- Location within British Columbia

Highest point
- Elevation: 2,269 m (7,444 ft)
- Prominence: 144 m (472 ft)
- Parent peak: Hermitage Peak
- Listing: Mountains of British Columbia
- Coordinates: 58°24′53″N 124°51′49″W

Geography
- Country: Canada
- Province: British Columbia
- District: Peace River Land District
- Parent range: Tower of London Range
- Topo map: NTS 94K7 Wokkpash Lake

Tower Mountain is a 2,269-metre (7,444 ft) peak in British Columbia, Canada. Its line parent is Hermitage Peak, 2 kilometres (1.2 mi) away. It is part of the Tower of London Range of the Muskwa Ranges in the Canadian Rockies.

Tower Mountain overlooks the southern end of Wokkpash Lake from the west. It is named after the Tower of London. Other mountains in the area are also named after the tower, including South Bastion Mountain, North Bastion Mountain and The White Tower. These names were given by the Royal Fusiliers (City of London Regiment) Canadian Rocky Mountains Expedition 1960, a small expedition with members from a regiment based in the Tower of London.
