= Hermitage Peak (British Columbia) =

Mountain in British Columbia, Canada

- Location within British Columbia

Highest point
- Elevation: 2,313 m (7,589 ft)
- Prominence: 128 m (420 ft)
- Parent peak: Constable Peak
- Listing: Mountains of British Columbia
- Coordinates: 58°23′48″N 124°51′36″W

Geography
- Country: Canada
- Parent range: Tower of London Range
- Topo map: NTS 94K7 Wokkpash Lake

Hermitage Peak is a 2,313-metre (7,589 ft) peak in British Columbia, Canada. Its line parent is Constable Peak, 4 kilometres (2.5 mi) away. It is part of the Tower of London Range of the Muskwa Ranges in the Canadian Rockies.
