= Buckinghorse River Wayside Provincial Park =

Provincial park in British Columbia, Canada

- IUCN category II (national park)
- Location within British Columbia
- Interactive map of Buckinghorse River Wayside Provincial Park
- Location: Peace River Regional District, British Columbia, Canada
- Nearest city: Pink Mountain, BC
- Coordinates: 57°23′05″N 122°50′34″W
- Area: 55 ha (140 acres)
- Established: April 13, 1970
- Governing body: BC Parks

Buckinghorse River Wayside Provincial Park is a provincial park in British Columbia, Canada located on the Alaska Highway (Highway 97), approximately 175 km northwest of the city of Fort St. John. It is located on the north side of the Buckinghorse River, to the northwest of the community of Pink Mountain. The park is 36 ha. in size and is near the community of Buckinghorse River.

The park was established by Order-in-Council in 1970, comprising initially 102 acres. The park's area was expanded the same year to approximately 135 acres. In 2000, the boundary was redrawn, with the current area comprising approximately 55 hectares.

== See also ==
- Prophet River Wayside Provincial Park
