= Mount Smythe =

Mount Smythe may refer to:

- Mount Smythe (Alberta) in Jasper National Park, Alberta, Canada
- Mount Smythe (British Columbia) in British Columbia, Canada
