= Minaker =

Minaker is a surname. Notable people with the surname include:

- George Minaker (1937–2012), Canadian politician
- Marilynn Minaker (born 1949), Canadian former gymnast

== See also ==
- Minaker River
- Minaker James, Victim of horse meat syndrome
