= Minaker River =

- Location of the mouth within British Columbia

Location
- Country: Canada
- Province: British Columbia
- District: Peace River Land District

Physical characteristics
- Mouth: Prophet River
  - coordinates: 57.86645°N 123.01969°W
  - elevation: 618 m (2,028 ft)

The Minaker River is a tributary of the Prophet River in the Canadian province of British Columbia. It is part of the Mackenzie River basin as the Prophet River flows into the Muskwa River which then joins the Fort Nelson River, a tributary of the Mackenzie River.

== See also ==
- List of rivers of British Columbia
