= Hermitage Peak =

Hermitage Peak may refer to:

- Hermitage Peak (Antarctica)
- Hermitage Peak (British Columbia)
