= NW2 =

NW2 may refer to:

- EMD NW2, a locomotive
- NW postcode area, a group of postcode districts covering part of northwest London
- Neverwinter Nights 2, a role-playing video game
- National Waterway 2 (India), a section of the Brahmaputra River
- Peck NW2, a peak in British Columbia, Canada
