= Sikanni Chief River =

Coordinates: 58°17′00″N 121°45′00″W

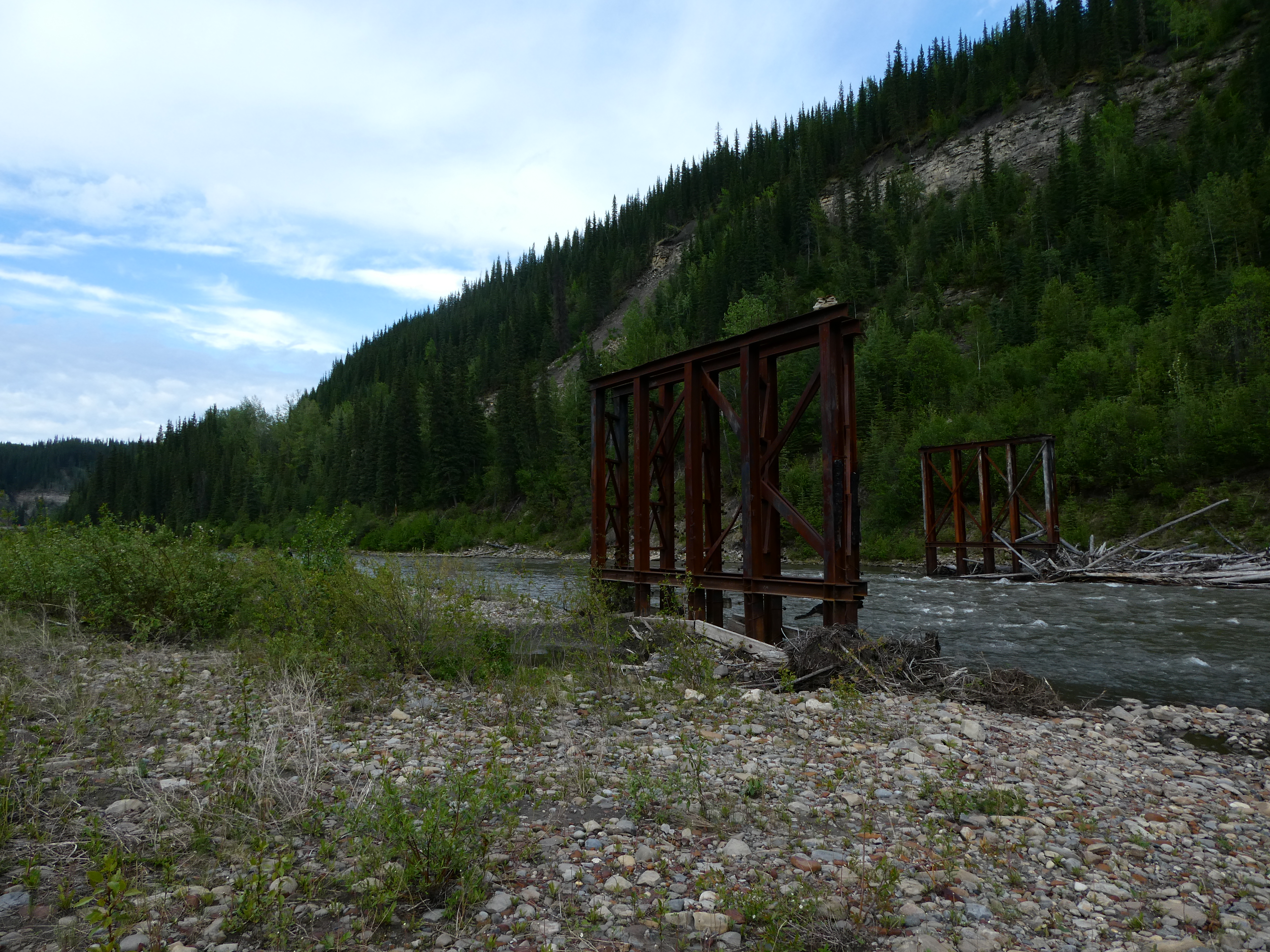
The remains of the original bridge at Sikanni Chief River, British Columbia, on the Alaska Highway.

The Sikanni Chief River, is a river in the Northern Rocky Mountains region of the northern interior of British Columbia, Canada. Its headwaters are near Mount McCusker, northeast of the head of the Finlay Arm of Williston Lake. It joins the Fontas River to form the Fort Nelson River southeast of the town of Fort Nelson. However, among the local population the Fontas is viewed only as a tributary of the Sikanni Chief, in the view that the Sikanni continues to exist, flowing northwest to where it meets the larger Muskwa River where the Fort Nelson River is actually formed in the eyes of the indigenous Dene, Cree and European-descendant populations of Fort Nelson First Nation and Fort Nelson.

The river's drainage basin is 2,160 square kilometres (830 sq mi).

== See also ==
- List of rivers of British Columbia
