= Tower of London Range =

Mountain range in British Columbia, Canada

- Location within British Columbia Location within Canada

Highest point
- Peak: Constable Peak
- Elevation: 2,824 m (9,265 ft)
- Listing: Mountains of British Columbia

Geography
- Country: Canada
- Province: British Columbia
- Range coordinates: 58°18′N 124°50′W
- Parent range: Muskwa Ranges; Canadian Rockies
- Topo map: NTS 94K7 Wokkpash Lake

The Tower of London Range is a sub-range of the Northern Rocky Mountains in northern British Columbia, Canada, located northwest of the Tuchodi Lakes at the northwest end of the Northern Rocky Mountains Provincial Park to the southwest of Fort Nelson.

== Name origin ==
The range is named for the Tower of London, with its peaks named for towers and buildings within the Tower. Names were conferred by members of the 1959–60 expedition to this area by the Royal Fusiliers (City of London Regiment), commanded by Captain M.F.R. Jones. Mountains named after the Tower include Tower Mountain, which overlooks the south end of Wokkpash Lake, South Bastion Mountain, North Bastion Mountain, Constable Peak and The White Tower. Related names include Fusilier Peak, Fusilier Glacier, Byward Peak and other names not specific to the Tower of London.

== List of mountains ==
Rank	Mountain / Peak	Elevation		Prominence		Coordinates
Rank	Mountain / Peak	m	ft	m	ft	Coordinates
1	Constable Peak	2,824	9,265	844	2,769	58°21′40″N 124°50′25″W
2	Mount Peck	2,807	9,209	582	1,909	58°16′20″N 124°44′43″W
3	Icecap Peak	2,794	9,167	329	1,079	58°15′23″N 124°43′39″W
4	Peck NW2	2,771	9,091	186	610	58°17′7″N 124°46′23″W
5	Develin Peak	2,759	9,052	274	899	58°18′17″N 124°45′51″W
6	Fusilier Peak	2,747	9,012	262	860	58°20′47″N 124°51′43″W
7	Angle Peak	2,736	8,976	132	433	58°16′53″N 124°45′9″W
8	Yalta Peak	2,732	8,963	147	482	58°14′41″N 124°43′46″W
8	The White Tower	2,732	8,963	307	1,007	58°24′55″N 124°59′9″W
10	Beauchamp Peak	2,729	8,953	364	1,194	58°23′38″N 124°56′50″W
11	North Bastion Mountain	2,696	8,845	391	1,283	58°26′54″N 124°58′6″W
12	Mount Aida	2,674	8,773	344	1,129	58°12′51″N 124°42′30″W
13	South Bastion Mountain	2,664	8,740	154	505	58°17′47″N 124°45′42″W
14	Byward Peak	2,656	8,714	166	545	58°24′1″N 124°56′0″W
15	Hermitage Peak	2,313	7,589	128	420	58°23′47″N 124°51′36″W
16	Tower Mountain	2,269	7,444	144	472	58°24′53″N 124°51′49″W

== See also ==
- Ranges of the Canadian Rockies
