= South Bastion =

South Bastion usually refers to a bastion at the south of a fortification. It may be used for:

- South Bastion, Gibraltar, a bastion at the southwest corner of the old town of Gibraltar
- South Bastion Mountain, a mountain in British Columbia, Canada named after the south bastion of the Tower of London
