= Dieppe Mountain =

Mountain in British Columbia, Canada

- Location within British Columbia
- Interactive map of Dieppe Mountain

Highest point
- Elevation: 2,863 m (9,393 ft)
- Prominence: 1,058 m (3,471 ft)
- Parent peak: Tuchodi Peak
- Listing: Mountains of British Columbia
- Coordinates: 58°28′31″N 125°29′09″W

Naming
- Etymology: Dieppe Raid

Geography
- Country: Canada
- Province: British Columbia
- District: Peace River Land District
- Parent range: Battle of Britain Range; Northern Rocky Mountains
- Topo map: NTS 94K6 Normandy Mountain

Dieppe Mountain is a 2,863-metre (9,393 ft) peak in British Columbia, Canada, rising to a prominence of 1,058 metres (3,471 ft) above Gataga Pass. Its line parent is Tuchodi Peak, 55 kilometres (34 mi) away. It is part of the Northern Rocky Mountains. The mountain is located West of the junction of Racing River and Delano Creek and SW of Fort Nelson. Dieppe Mountain is named for the World War II Dieppe Raid that involved Canadian troops which took place on 19 August 1942.

The mountain is part of the Battle of Britain Range, in which the names of peaks commemorate the allied leaders in World War II, places where the leaders met, and battles in which Canadian troops served. Thus names include Mount Churchill, Mount Roosevelt, Teheran Mountain, Yalta Peak, Falaise Mountain and Ortona Mountain.
