= Develin Peak =

Mountain in British Columbia, Canada

- Location within British Columbia
- Interactive map of Develin Peak

Highest point
- Elevation: 2,759 m (9,052 ft)
- Prominence: 274 m (899 ft)
- Parent peak: Peck NW2
- Listing: Mountains of British Columbia
- Coordinates: 58°18′17″N 124°45′51″W

Geography
- Country: Canada
- Province: British Columbia
- District: Peace River Land District
- Parent range: Tower of London Range
- Topo map: NTS 94K7 Wokkpash Lake

Develin Peak is a 2,759-metre (9,052 ft) peak in British Columbia, Canada, with a prominence of 274 metres (899 ft). Its line parent is Peck NW2, 2 kilometres (1.2 mi) away. It is part of the Tower of London Range of the Muskwa Ranges in the Canadian Rockies, to the north the Wokkpash Glacier.

== Bibliography ==
- "Develin Peak - British Columbia". Bivouac.com.
- "Develin Peak". Geographical Names Data Base. Natural Resources Canada.
