= Peck NW2 =

Peak in British Columbia, Canada

- Location within British Columbia

Highest point
- Elevation: 2,771 m (9,091 ft)
- Prominence: 186 m (610 ft)
- Parent peak: Mount Peck
- Listing: Mountains of British Columbia
- Coordinates: 58°17′07″N 124°46′23″W

Geography
- Country: Canada
- Province: British Columbia
- District: Peace River Land District
- Parent range: Tower of London Range
- Topo map: NTS 94K7 Wokkpash Lake

Peck NW2 is a 2,771-metre (9,091 ft) peak in British Columbia, Canada, with a prominence of 186 metres (610 ft). Its line parent is Mount Peck, 2 kilometres (1.2 mi) away. It is part of the Tower of London Range of the Muskwa Ranges in the Canadian Rockies.
