= Develin =

Develin may refer to:

- James Develin (b. 1988), American football player
- John E. Develin (1820–1888), American lawyer and politician
- Mike Develin (b. 1980), American mathematician
- Develin Peak, in British Columbia, Canada
- USS Develin (AMc-45), US Navy ship
- the European swift
