= Exploration Peak (British Columbia) =

Mountain in the Canadian Rockies

- Location within British Columbia Location within Canada
- Interactive map of Exploration Peak

Highest point
- Elevation: 2,665 m (8,743 ft)
- Prominence: 355 m (1,165 ft)
- Parent peak: Rutter Peak (2756 m)
- Listing: Mountains of British Columbia
- Coordinates: 58°20′24″N 125°00′19″W

Geography
- Country: Canada
- Province: British Columbia
- District: Peace River Land District
- Parent range: Battle of Britain Range
- Topo map: NTS 94K7 Wokkpash Lake

Exploration Peak is located on the eastern side of upper Racing River in the Battle of Britain Range of the Canadian Rockies. The peak was named by the Newcastle University Exploration Society on their 1974 British Columbia Expedition.
