= Pink Mountain Provincial Park =

Provincial park in British Columbia, Canada

- IUCN category II (national park)
- Location within British Columbia
- Interactive map of Pink Mountain Provincial Park
- Location: British Columbia, Canada
- Nearest city: Pink Mountain, Fort St. John
- Coordinates: 57°04′13″N 122°52′59″W
- Area: 98 ha (240 acres)
- Established: 1999
- Governing body: BC Parks

Pink Mountain Provincial Park is a provincial park in British Columbia, Canada.

== History ==
The park was traditionally used by the Sekani and Dunneza (Beaver) first nations. During the late 18th century European fur trappers, traders, and explorers moved into and through the area. Fur trading posts were established in the surrounding area at Fort St. John, Hudson's Hope and Fort Nelson. With the development of the Alaska Highway in 1943, improved access encouraged the development of forestry and gas exploration. Road development further facilitated use by the public who sought out the unique opportunity to view the diverse wildlife species found in the area. In 1997 the Fort St. John Land and Resource Management Plan recommended the area for protection. It was subsequently designated as a provincial park in 1999. The primary role of Pink Mountain Provincial Park is to protect a significant palaeontological site containing examples of large fauna from the Mesozoic Era.

== Geography ==
Pink Mountain Provincial Park is located in the Muskwa Foothills eco-section. This area represents a part of the eastern foothills of the Rocky Mountains. The subalpine zone, located at 1100 to 1550 m elevation consists primarily of black and white spruce, lodgepole pine, willow and birch. Above 1550 m, the area consists of alpine tundra vegetation. The vegetation consists of shrubs, herbs, mosses and lichens which all contribute to support the significant diversity of wildlife species.

== Wildlife ==
Pink Mountain protects important habitat for numerous large herbivores such as caribou, elk and moose. Plains bison, a relative newcomer to the area, was introduced in 1968 and has since thrived. The area is also internationally recognized for its arctic butterflies, which are at their southernmost limit of distribution. Butterflies are attracted to Pink Mountain by the unmatched concentration of tundra plants. The diversity of plants is unique. Peaks of similar elevation in the area do not display anything like the variety of arctic/alpine plants that occurs on Pink Mountain. Significant species found within the park and surrounding area include grizzly and black bear, lynx, fisher, and wolverine.

=== Caribou ===
The Pink Mountain caribou herd, also referred to as the Sikanni Chief, Cypress River, Prophet River, Cameron-Chowade, and Beatton-Blueberry caribou herd, are part of the Northern Mountain Population within the Northern Mountains National Ecological Area (NMNEA). Pink Mountain caribou are classified as montane and northern caribou ecotypes of the North American subspecies Rangifer tarandus (woodland caribou). Northern caribou herds, in general and the Pink Caribou Herd in particular, were listed as vulnerable by the committee on the Status of Endangered Wildlife in Canada (COSEWIC). blue-listed (special concern status) provincially by the British Columbia Conservation Data Centre. In 1996 there were 1,300 animals. By 2002 the numbers had declined to 850 animals and was declining (IWMS 2004).

== Access ==
Pink Mountain Provincial Park is located approximately 180 km northwest of Fort St. John. It is reached by turning west off the Alaska Highway at mile 147, onto Road #192. This road proceeds in a south-westerly direction for 16 km. At this point there is a fork in the road, access to Pink Mountain is by the northerly fork which travels up Pink Mountain via a number of switchbacks. The road to the summit of Pink Mountain is not maintained in winter and is accessible by vehicle only from late spring to fall.

== See also ==
- List of British Columbia Provincial Parks
- List of Canadian provincial parks
