= Tetsa River Provincial Park =

Former provincial park in British Columbia, Canada

Coordinates: 58°39′N 123°57′W

Tetsa River Provincial Park is a former provincial park in British Columbia, Canada. It is part of the larger Muskwa-Kechika Management Area. It is located on the north side of the Tetsa River at the confluence of Mill Creek, and is on the Alaska Highway.
