= Tuchodi Peak =

Mountain in British Columbia, Canada

- Location within British Columbia

Highest point
- Elevation: 2,900 m (9,500 ft)
- Prominence: 1,210 m (3,970 ft)
- Parent peak: Mount Lloyd George
- Listing: Mountains of British Columbia
- Coordinates: 58°05′28″N 124°52′48″W

Geography
- Province: British Columbia
- Parent range: Northern Rocky Mountains
- Topo map: NTS 94K2 Sicily Mountain

Tuchodi Peak is a 2,900 metres (9,500 ft) peak in British Columbia, Canada, rising to a prominence of 1,210 metres (3,970 ft) above South Gataga Pass. Its line parent is Mount Lloyd George, 23 kilometres (14 mi) away. It is part of the Northern Rocky Mountains, and is named after the Tuchodi River.
