= Muskwa River =

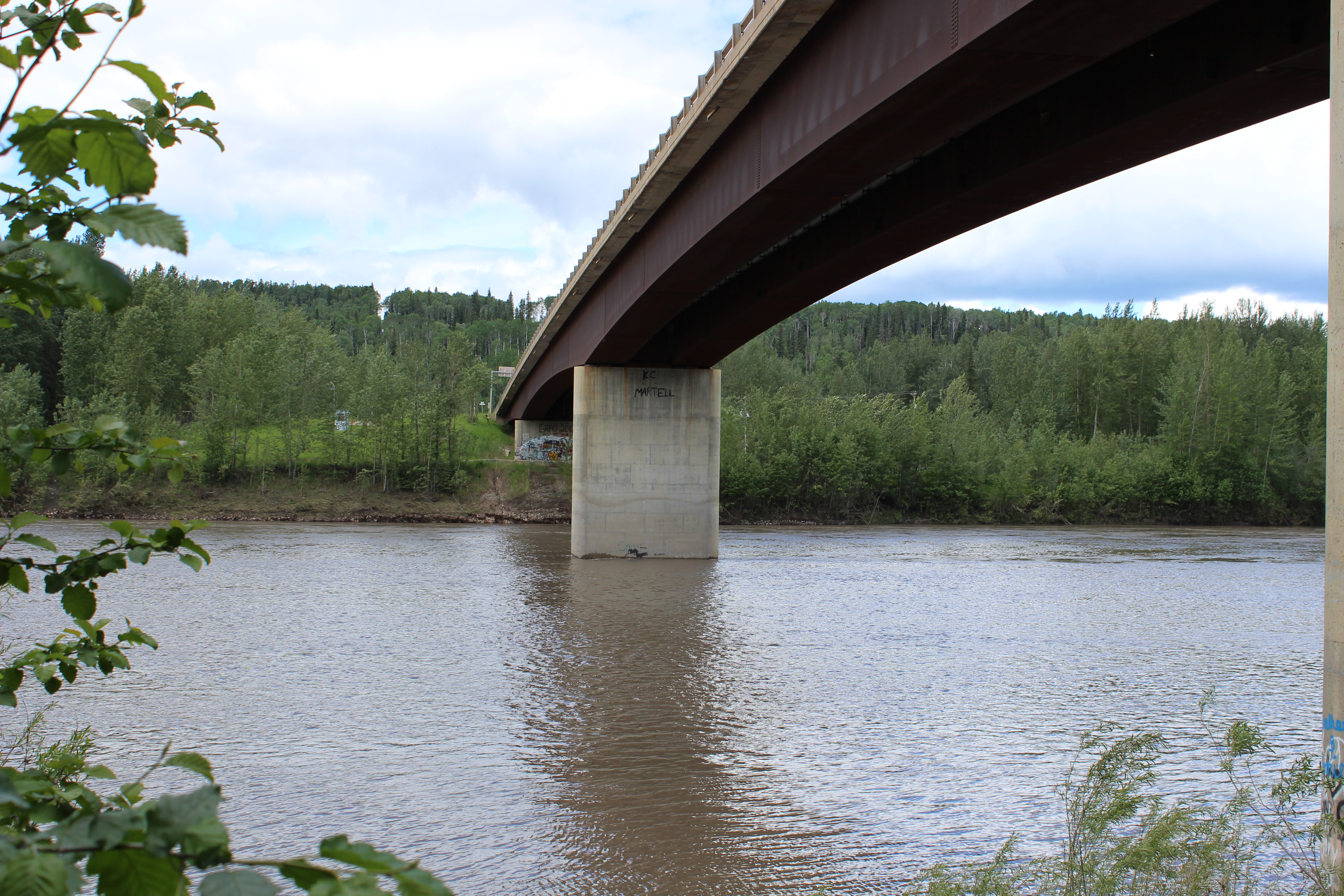
- Muskwa near Fort Nelson

- Mouth of Muskwa River

Location
- Country: Canada
- Province: British Columbia
- District: Peace River Land District

Physical characteristics
- Source
  - location: Fern Lake, Muskwa Ranges
  - coordinates: 57°45′14″N 124°47′20″W
  - elevation: 1,400 m (4,600 ft)
- Mouth
  - location: Fort Nelson River
  - coordinates: 58°49′49″N 122°32′34″W
  - elevation: 305 m (1,001 ft)
- Length: 257 km (160 mi)
- Basin size: 20,300 km^{2} (7,800 mi^{2})
- Discharge
  - average: 213.7 m^{3}/s (7,550 cu ft/s)

The Muskwa River flows 257 kilometres (160 mi) through northern British Columbia, Canada. It is a major tributary of the Fort Nelson River - part of the Mackenzie River system. The river rises at Fern Lake in the Bedaux Pass in the Northern Rocky Mountains. From there, it flows generally east, then north, and then east again to meet with the Fort Nelson River just east of the town of Fort Nelson. The river drops approximately 1,100 metres (3,600 ft), its course taking it down the Rocky Mountain foothills through sub-alpine and boreal forest to meander across the forest and muskegs of the vast Liard River plains. From mouth to headwater, prominent tributaries include the Prophet River, Tuchodi River, and Gathto Creek. Much of the upper portions of this wilderness river and its watershed are located in the Northern Rocky Mountains Provincial Park, which is part of the larger Muskwa-Kechika Management Area. The region is a popular wilderness recreation destination.

A geological unit, the Muskwa Formation, was named for this river, as are the Muskwa Ranges, which is the name for the subgroup of the Rocky Mountains between the Peace and Liard rivers.

Muskwa means Bear in the Cree Language.

== Tributaries ==
- Fern Lake
- Crehan Creek
- Reimer Creek
- Wenger Creek
- Pentreath Creek
- Varrick Creek
- Kluachesi Creek
- Beckman Creek
- Tuchodi River
- Chlotapecta Creek
- Chischa River
- Tetsa River
- Gairdner Creek
- Steamboat Creek
- Kledo Creek
- Raspberry Creek
- Miduski Creek
- Akue Creek
- Pouce Creek
- Prophet River

== See also ==
- List of rivers of British Columbia
