= Fontas River =

Coordinates: 58°17′10″N 121°45′00″W

The Fontas River, originally Fantasque's River, after the name of a chief of the Sekani people, is a river in northeastern British Columbia, Canada, having its origin in northwestern Alberta, Canada. It joins the Sikanni Chief River southeast of the town of Fort Nelson, British Columbia, forming the Fort Nelson River.

"Fontas River...drains a large extent of country, roughly 3600 square miles. Its water, mainly derived from surface water and swamps, is dark in colour, and at its mouth forms a deep contrast to the white silty water of the Sikanni Chief.... The Fort Nelson River is formed by the junction of the Sikanni Chief and Fontas Rivers, at which point it is from 400 to 500 feet wide...." (extracts from the report of G.B. Milligan, surveyor, 14 December 1914)

== See also ==
- List of rivers of Alberta
- List of rivers of British Columbia
