= King Peak (British Columbia) =

Mountain in British Columbia, Canada

- Location within British Columbia
- Interactive map of King Peak

Highest point
- Elevation: 2,848 m (9,344 ft)
- Prominence: 918 m (3,012 ft)
- Parent peak: Normandy Mountain
- Coordinates: 58°13′26″N 124°51′25″W

Geography
- District: Peace River Land District
- Topo map: NTS 94K2 Sicily Mountain

King Peak is a 2,848 metres (9,344 ft) peak in British Columbia, Canada, rising to a prominence of 918 metres (3,012 ft) above Grizzly Pass. Its line parent is Normandy Mountain, 28 kilometres (17 mi) away. It is part of the Canadian Rockies.
