= Prophet River Wayside Provincial Park =

Provincial park in British Columbia, Canada

- IUCN category II (national park)
- Location within British Columbia
- Interactive map of Prophet River Wayside Provincial Park
- Location: British Columbia, Canada
- Nearest city: Fort St. John
- Coordinates: 57°58′33″N 122°46′41″W
- Area: 1.13 km^{2} (0.44 sq mi)
- Established: January 7, 1977
- Governing body: BC Parks

Prophet River Wayside Provincial Park is a provincial park in British Columbia, Canada. It is located along the Prophet River, by the Alaska Highway, between the localities of Trutch and Prophet River. Originally created as a Provincial Recreation Area in 1977 with an area of 707 acres (2.86 km^{2}), it was designated a provincial park in 1999 with an area of 111 hectares.

As of June 4, 2007, there are no services or facilities at this park because of safety reasons. BC Parks recommends that travellers on the Alaska Highway use Buckinghorse River Wayside Provincial Park, 60 km south, or Andy Bailey Regional Park, 70 km north, instead.

== See also ==
- Prophet River Hotsprings Provincial Park
- List of British Columbia Provincial Parks
