= Mount Peck =

Mountain in British Columbia, Canada

- Location within British Columbia
- Interactive map of Mount Peck

Highest point
- Elevation: 2,807 m (9,209 ft)
- Prominence: 582 m (1,909 ft)
- Parent peak: Constable Peak (2824 m)
- Listing: Mountains of British Columbia
- Coordinates: 58°16′20″N 124°44′43″W

Geography
- Country: Canada
- Province: British Columbia
- District: Peace River Land District
- Parent range: Tower of London Range
- Topo map: NTS 94K7 Wokkpash Lake

Mount Peck, is a mountain in the Tower of London Range of the Muskwa Ranges of the Northern Canadian Rockies in British Columbia. It has a prominence of 582 metres (1,909 ft). Its line parent is Constable Peak, 11 kilometres (6.8 mi) away.

Until 1987 it was named Mount Stalin, when its name was changed to recognize Don Peck, a trapper, guide and outfitter from the area. This renaming occurred as a result of the advocacy of Dr. Lubomyr Luciuk and Dr. Bohdan Kordan, with the support of the Ukrainian Canadian Civil Liberties Association.
