= Police Trail =

Trail in British Columbia built during the Klondike Gold Rush

The Police Trail (or Police Road) was built across parts of northern British Columbia as an alternate, overland route to the Yukon gold fields in 1897. It was used by only a few miners during the Yukon gold rush and fell into disrepair, but parts are still used by local hunting guides, hunters, outfitters and trappers.

== History ==
After mid-19th century gold rushes in British Columbia, in 1896, gold was found at Bonanza Creek, a tributary to the Klondike River near Dawson City, Yukon, and the Klondike Gold Rush began.

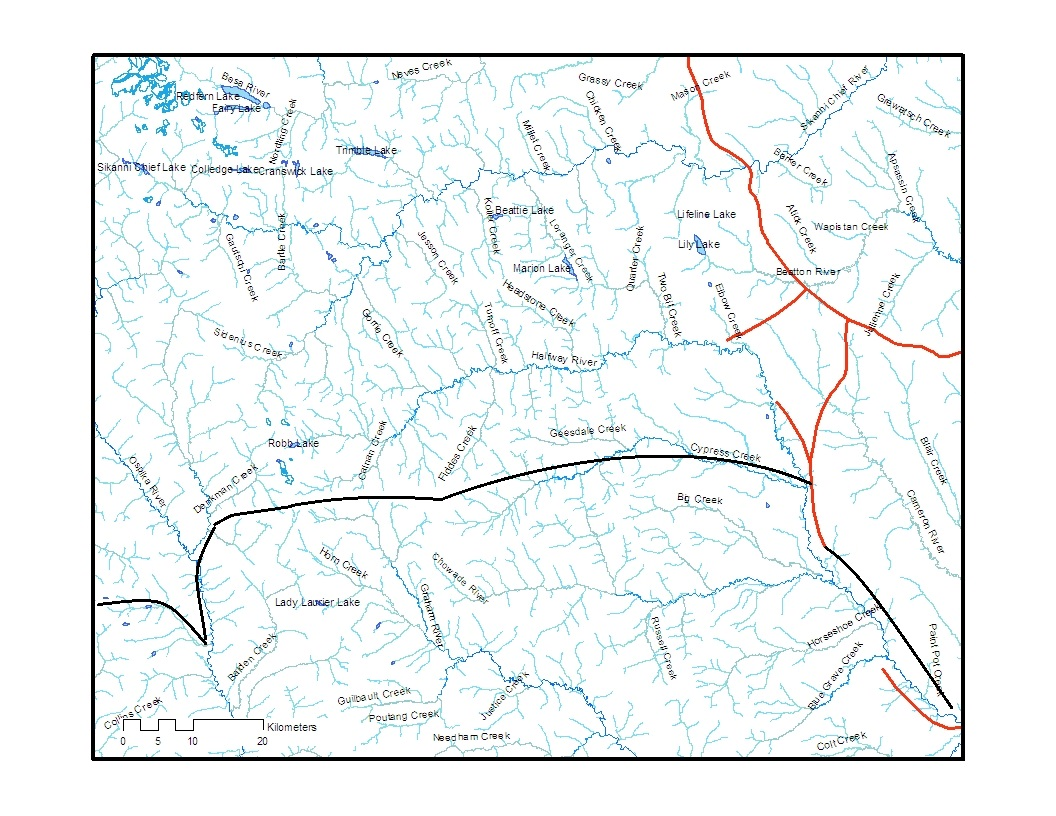
Route of Police Trail over the Rocky Mountains via Halfway River and Cypress Creek

Many miners tried to reach the Yukon overland from Edmonton, Alberta. In the chaos of "prospectors attempting to reach the gold fields overland through northeastern BC, starvation, violence, and disorder inevitably surfaced." The Canadian government commissioned the North-West Mounted Police (NWMP) to find or build a passable trail.

Mills noted that,

The Northwest Mounted Police Trail (NWMP Trail) was initially one of numerous Aboriginal or "native walking" trails that laced through the valleys and passes of the northern Rockies. Archaeological evidence indicates that some of these trails may well be thousands of years old. These trails were a vital connection between families and communities, and between hunting and gathering areas for the original inhabitants of the land.

The task was assigned to Inspector J. D. Moodie and crew of the North-West Mounted Police. In 1897 Moodie's team, with First Nations guides, cut a trail up Cypress Creek (tributary to Halfway River), over Laurier Pass and down the Ospika River to Fort Graham. The road building involved cutting into hillsides to make a level road grade wide enough for a small cart; but fills were not used, presumably because of the difficulty of reinforcing and maintaining them.

The NWMP used and patrolled the trail for another 10 years, after which it was not formally maintained. However, the trail was used by First Nation communities, local hunters and trappers, geographical surveyors, and adventurers. The making of the Police Trail and a subsequent trail up the Columbia Trench from Fort Graham, has been described by R. M. Patterson in "Finlay's River"

== Other management and protected areas ==
The Muskwa-Kechika Management Area, created by the provincial government in 1998, encompasses the Cypress Creek drainage and the eastern portion of the Police Trail.

The 99,982-hectare (247,060-acre) Graham-Laurier Park, established by the provincial government in 1999, encompasses the headwaters of Cypress Creek and Laurier Pass, through which the Police Trail passes.

== Current Use ==
In 1970, at least the eastern part of this trail up to the height of the Rockies near Mt. Lady Laurier was still in use by local trappers and hunters and by guide-outfitter R. Lynn Ross and his guides and clients whose tenure was west of Pink Mountain, B.C. Prior to hunting season, Ross sent guides and ranch hands along his trails to cut out any fallen timber and make them passable for a pack train of horses. The Police Trail was the southern-most of Ross's three main hunting trails. The Halfway First Nation has preserved the Police Trail as far west as Laurier Pass. The guiding tenure is now owned by the Blueberry First Nations.

Access to the area is by road from the community of Pink Mountain or by resource roads from the community of Upper Halfway River. Motorized access to the Police Trail is not permitted, but a trail suitable for motorized access (REC6804) runs adjacent to it.
