= Jackpine Remnant Provincial Park =

Provincial Park

- IUCN category II (national park)
- Location within British Columbia
- Interactive map of Jackpine Remnant Provincial Park
- Location: Peace River Land District, British Columbia, Canada
- Nearest city: Fort Nelson, BC
- Coordinates: 59°13′51″N 123°20′28″W
- Area: 148 ha (370 acres)
- Established: January 25, 2001
- Governing body: BC Parks

Jackpine Remnant Provincial Park is a provincial park in British Columbia, Canada, in the area of the community of Fort Nelson. The park, which is 148 hectares (370 acres) in area, protects one of the few remaining jackpine stands in the Fort Nelson area. The park is near the crossing of BC Highway 77 (Fort Nelson-Fort Simpson, Northwest Territories highway) over the Fort Nelson River, northwest of the town.
