= The White Tower (British Columbia) =

Mountain in British Columbia, Canada

- Location within British Columbia

Highest point
- Elevation: 2,732 m (8,963 ft)
- Prominence: 307 m (1,007 ft)
- Parent peak: Fusilier Peak
- Listing: Mountains of British Columbia
- Coordinates: 58°24′55″N 124°59′09″W

Geography
- Country: Canada
- Province: British Columbia
- District: Peace River Land District
- Parent range: Tower of London Range
- Topo map: NTS 94K7 Wokkpash Lake

The White Tower is a 2,732-metre (8,963 ft) peak in British Columbia, Canada. Its line parent is Fusilier Peak, 10 kilometres (6.2 mi) away. It is part of the Tower of London Range of the Muskwa Ranges in the Canadian Rockies.

The White Tower is named after the White Tower of the Tower of London.Other mountains in the area are also named after the Tower, including North Bastion Mountain, South Bastion Mountain and Tower Mountain, which overlooks the south end of Wokkpash Lake. These names were given by the Royal Fusiliers (City of London Regiment) Canadian Rocky Mountains Expedition 1960, a small expedition with members from a regiment based in the Tower of London.
