= Sahtaneh River =

- Location within British Columbia

Location
- Country: Canada
- Province: British Columbia
- District: Peace River Land District

Physical characteristics
- Source
  - coordinates: 59.001028°N 121.923520°W
- Length: 64 km (40 mi)

The Sahtaneh River is a river in the Mackenzie River watershed in British Columbia, Canada. It travels from a point in the Canadian Rockies (59.001028°N 121.923520°W) approximately 64 kilometres (40 mi) west to the Fort Nelson River.

== See also ==
- List of rivers of British Columbia
- Snake River (Sahtaneh River tributary)
