= Hole-in-the-Wall Provincial Park =

Park in Canada

- IUCN category III (natural monument or feature)
- Location within British Columbia
- Interactive map of Hole-in-the-Wall Provincial Park
- Location: Peace River RD, British Columbia, Canada
- Nearest town: Tumbler Ridge
- Coordinates: 55°08′46″N 121°51′14″W
- Area: 137 ha (340 acres)
- Established: June 29, 2000
- Governing body: BC Parks

Hole-in-the-Wall Provincial Park is a provincial park located in the Hart Ranges of British Columbia, Canada. It was established on June 29, 2000 to protect a resurgent spring which emerges from the base of a limestone rock wall. The spring forms a powerful stream that flows into the Sukunka River at the northern end of the park.

== See also ==
- Sukunka Falls Provincial Park
