= Tuchodi River =

Coordinates: 58.360673°N 123.634352°W

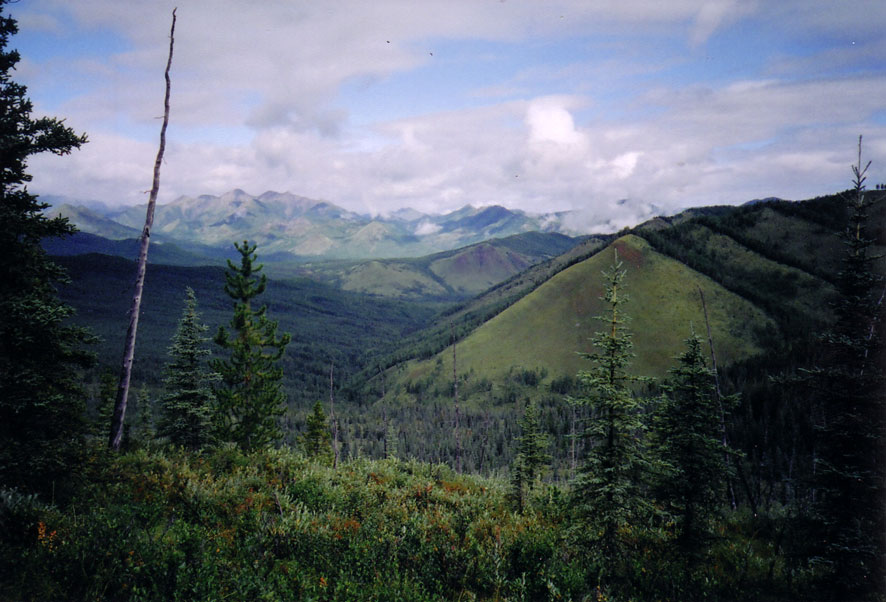
- Looking down Dead Dog Creek towards the Tuchodi River

Location
- Country: Canada
- Province: British Columbia
- District: Peace River Land District

Physical characteristics
- Mouth
  - location: Muskwa River

The Tuchodi River is a stream in the Northern Rocky Mountains of northern British Columbia, Canada. The river flows through the Northern Rocky Mountains Provincial Park in a northeasterly direction to the Muskwa River. Its name comes from Slavey words that mean "place of large water", probably a reference to the two lakes where the river widens.

== Course ==
The Lloyd George Icefield around Mount Lloyd George in 1998 covered over 70 square kilometres (27 sq mi). The Kwadacha and Lloyd George glaciers drain the icefield to the east. The icefield is bounded by the Warneford River and the Tuchodi River. The headwaters of the Tuchodi feed the West and East Tuchodi lakes. West Tuchodi Lake is formed where an alluvial fan caused by glacial action blocks the flow of the river. East Tuchodi Lake is formed where the river is blocked by sand and gravel debris at the mouth of Joplin Creek. The small river continues after the lakes to the Muskwa River, flowing fast through braided channels in a bed made of glacial rocks, gravel and sand. Tuchodi Peak named after the river.

== Flora ==
The Upper Tuchodi valley runs between mountains with dwarf willow, dwarf birch, alpine grasses, sedges and lichen above the tree line, which is about 1,600 metres (5,200 ft) above sea level. Lower down, there are forests of lodgepole pine and white and black spruce. White spruce and aspen, and some balsam poplar, grow along the riverside, and there are willows and wildflowers on the sandy gravel bars of the river. Where the river leaves the Rockies and enters the eastern foothills, there has been large-scale burning to enhance wildlife range. This has caused formation of young aspen stands and grasslands. In this area the floodplain of the river is narrower, running between high sandstone and shale hills with steep sides through narrow gorges with many shallow rapids.

== Wildlife ==
There is a healthy population of elk and moose in the foothills of the Rocky Mountains, where they find abundant food. Higher up, there are stone sheep and goats. The valley is home to grizzly bears, black bears and wolves throughout its length.

== See also ==
- List of rivers of British Columbia
