= Buckinghorse River =

- Location within Canada

Location
- Country: Canada
- Province: British Columbia

Buckinghorse River is a river in the province of British Columbia,.

In the area around the Buckinghorse River grows mainly pine forests. The neighborhood around the Buckinghorse River is almost uninhabited, with less than two inhabitants per square kilometre. The neighborhood is part of the boreal climate zones. .

== See also ==
- List of rivers of British Columbia
