= Pink Mountain, British Columbia =

Settlement in British Columbia, Canada

Coordinates: 57°03′N 122°52′W

Pink Mountain may refer to an unincorporated community on the Alaska Highway, a nearby mountain, or the hunting guiding territory west of the mountain.

== The community ==
Pink Mountain is an unincorporated community in British Columbia, Canada. Nestled in the Rocky Mountain foothills, the town is located 113 miles (180 km) NW of Fort St. John and 140 miles (224 km) NW of Dawson Creek, on Mile 143 of the Alaska Highway. Approximately 100 people inhabit the community.

== The Mountain ==
Pink Mountain itself is an isolated mountain of about 1,600 m that rises from a boreal forest plain at about 1,030 m. It is separated from the main ranges of the northern Rocky Mountains to the west by Quarter Creek (formerly "Two-Bit Creek", named after English name for a chief of the Blueberry First Nation). The top is alpine tundra. It is known for its alpine flora, some species of which are otherwise rare outside of the Arctic tundra.

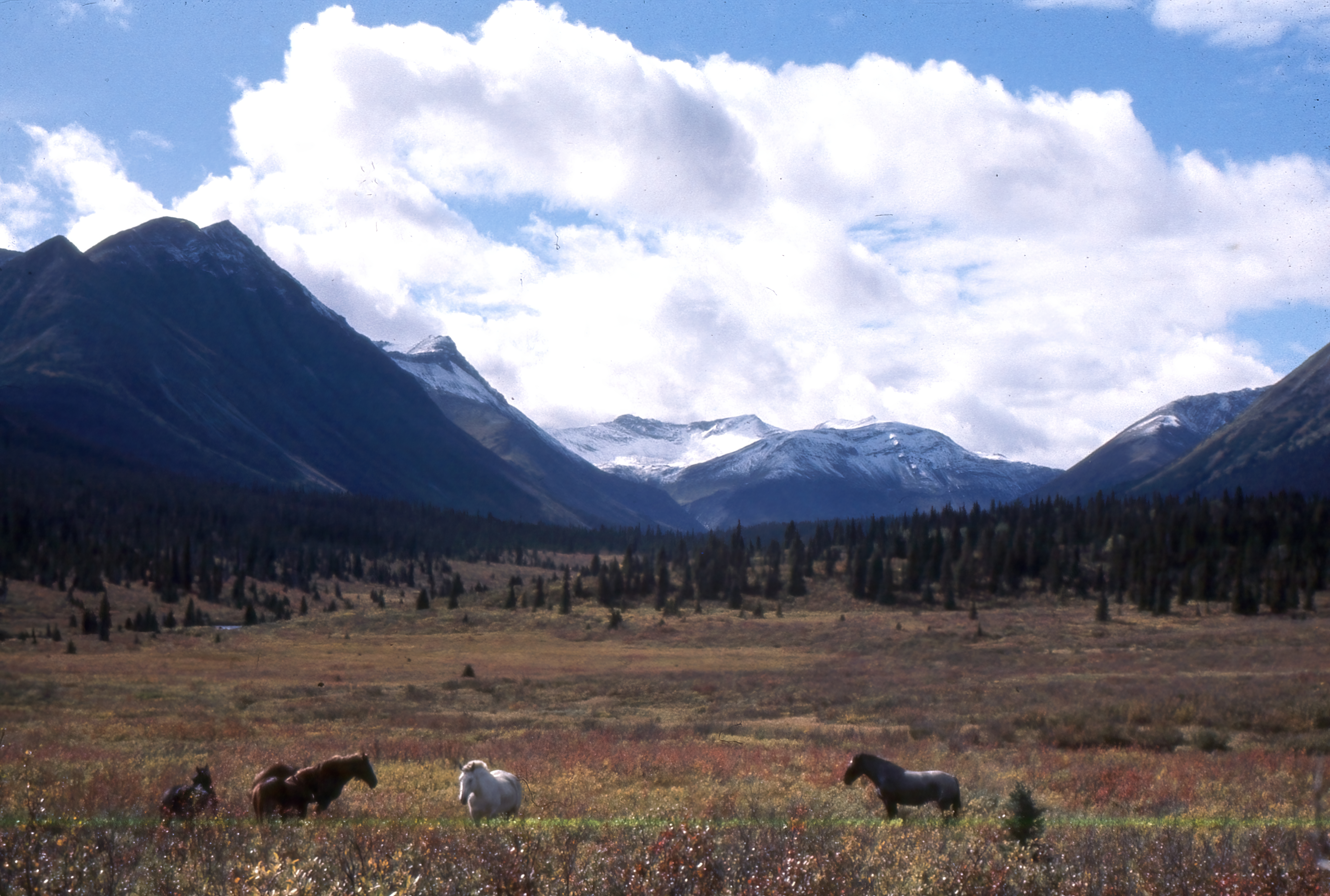
Ross's hunting camp on the upper Halfway River looking northwest.

Pink Mountain Provincial Park is 10 miles (16 km) south-west of Mile 147. Named after the pinkish burnt rock seams, part of the mountain has been designated provincial park status. The park's primary role is to protect a significant palaeontological site containing examples of large marine fossils from the Mesozoic Era, including the largest ichthyosaur ever discovered. One of the region's designated areas for wildlife, much of the park area is on a fairly steep slope. It is only sparsely covered with vegetation and is not suitable butterfly habitat. Prime butterfly habitat for the rare arctic butterflies in the southernmost part of their range is threatened by the proposed development of a wind farm with its large concrete footprint.

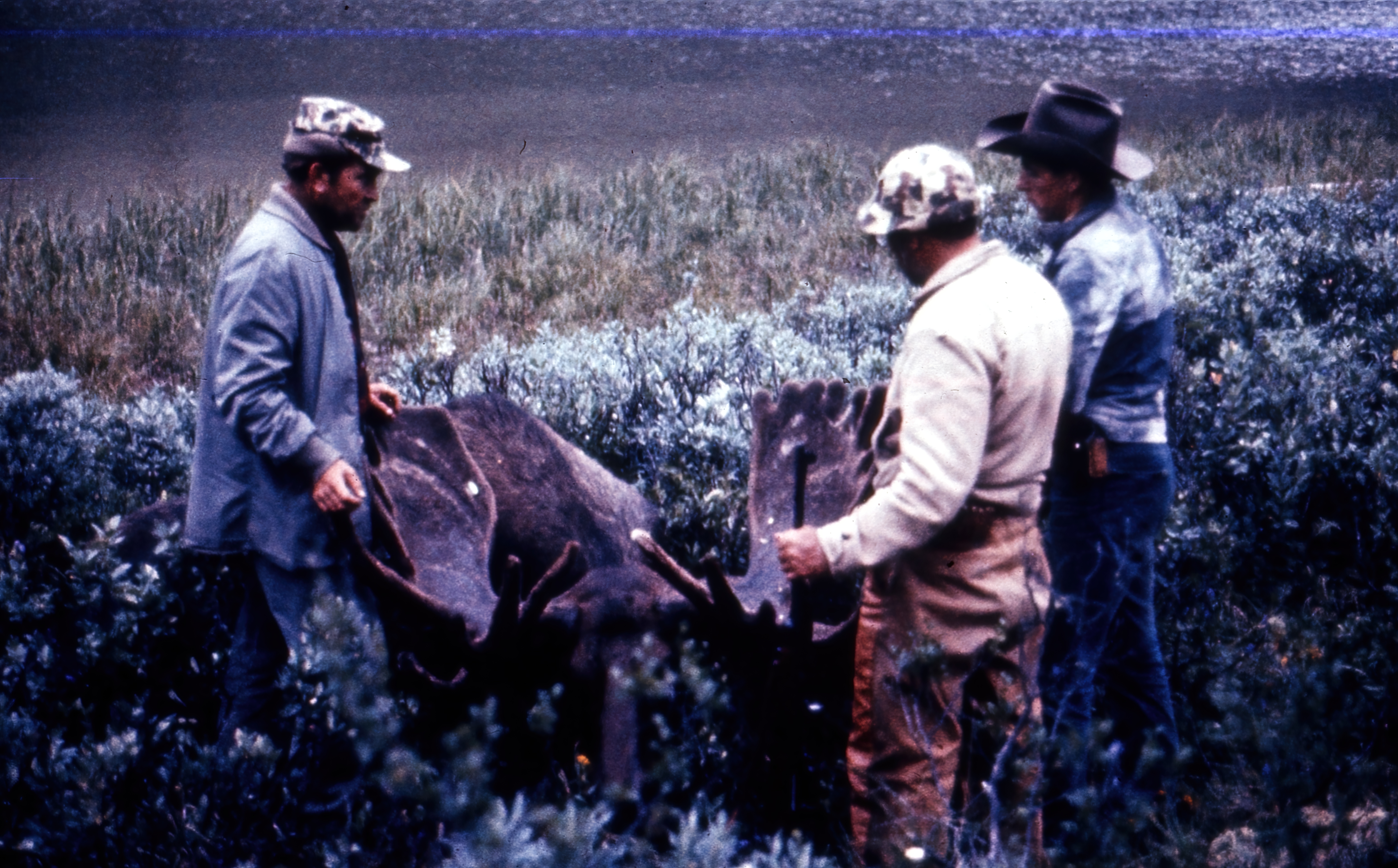
Hunters from Mexico and their guide (in western hat) with a trophy moose on R. Lynn Ross's tenure, August 1970.

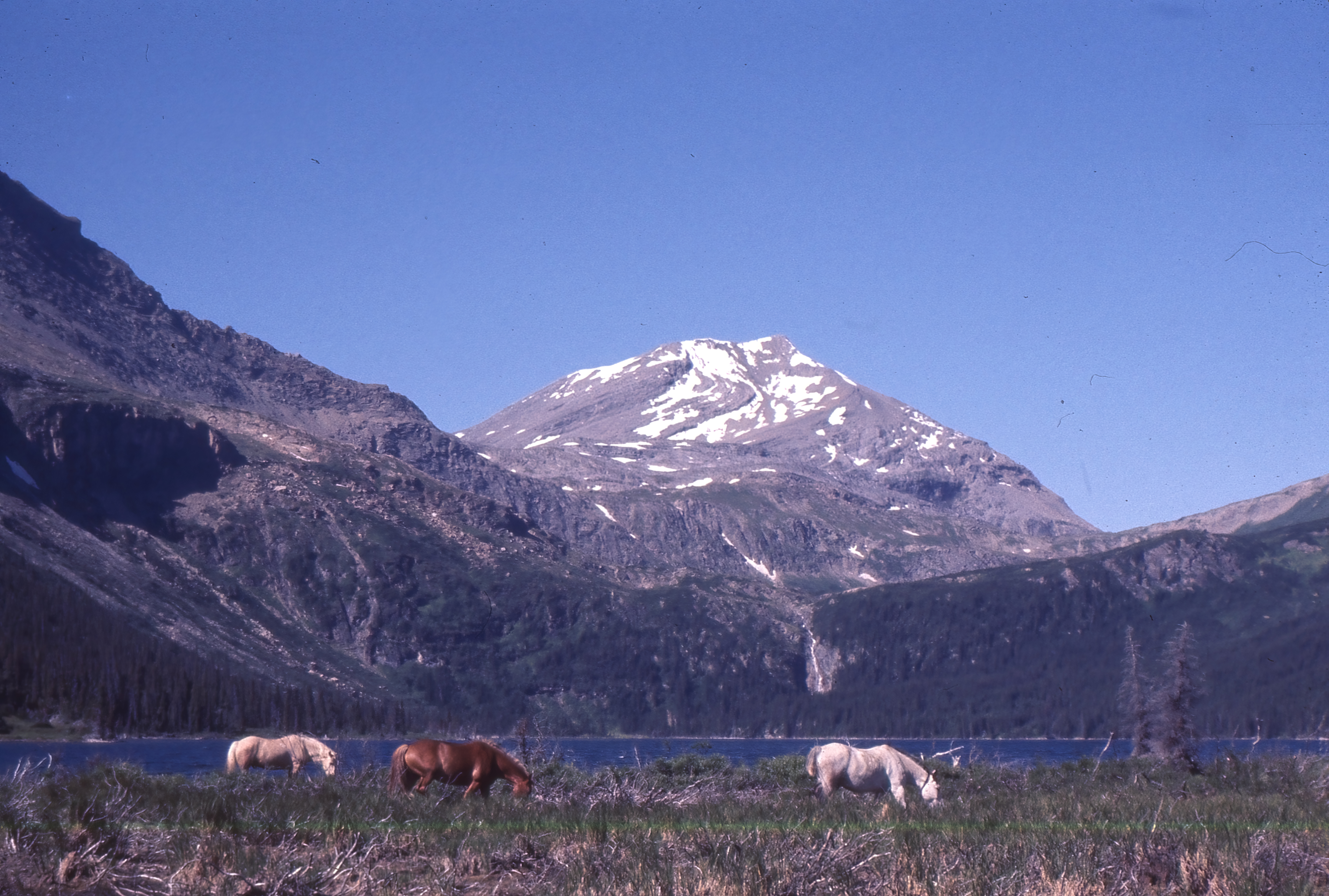
One of Ross's hunting camps at Robb Lake, Mt. Kenny in the background.

== Beyond Pink Mountain ==
The Rocky Mountains to the west of Pink Mountain is the only place in the province where wild Plains bison roam. The 1,000+ (down from a high of about 3,500 some years ago) bison are not naturally occurring, but descendants of an escaped herd of 50 from those imported by local guide and outfitter R. Lynn Ross in 1971. In 1969, Ross had bid on 50 bison for sale from Elk Island National Park, Alberta, where they were for sale because of overpopulation in the park. His bid was unsuccessful. In 1970 he bid again and bought 50 head, which he released on his fenced ranch in 1971. Ross, a guide-outfitter, owned an extensive guiding tenure stretching from his ranch west to the summit of the northern Rocky Mountains and encompassing Mt. Wright, Mt. Robb, Mt. McCusker, Mt. Sikani Chief, Mt. Kenny, Marion Lake and the headwaters of Halfway River and the Sikani Chief River. His clients included hunters from Europe (especially Germans, who sought a trophy moose, the largest member of the deer family and whose antlers often surpass 2 meters in width), the United States of America and Mexico. American and Mexican hunters sought a Stone's Sheep trophy, one of four types (as the hunters counted them) needed to complete a "grand slam", i.e., one of each (the others being Dall's sheep, Rocky Mountain bighorn sheep and Desert Bighorn Sheep). Ross's tenure area had a reputation for producing large trophy Stone's sheep. The chance to bag a mountain caribou and mountain goat trophy was a bonus for his hunters. In the late 1960s and early 1970s, Ross offered free grazing to a neighbouring rancher to the southeast, across Halfway River, for a herd of about 35 Scottish Highland cattle, a picturesque, long-haired breed with wide horns that do well in cold climates. His idea was to have these long-horned cattle evoke a feeling of the Old West of the United States for his clients. To this end, he also bought a Yak stud and the bison in 1971. His idea was to let the yak interbreed with the bison and produce exotic hybrid offspring for his clients to see, and perhaps to hunt. Ross and his ranch hands had built miles of sturdy log fence, but they were no match for the bison, which soon escaped.

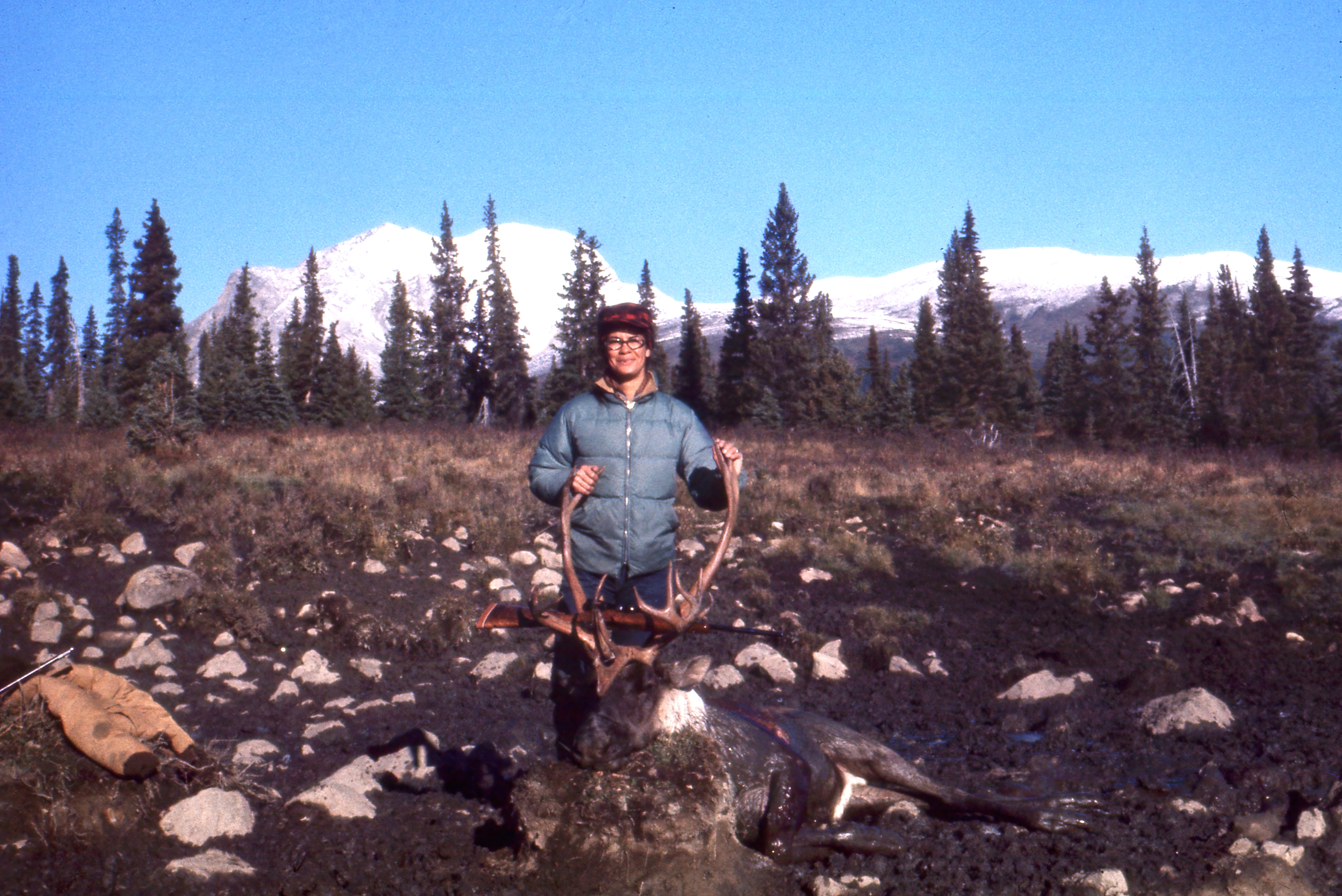
A hunter from Texas with a bull caribou that was shot for camp meat and for practice using the high-power rifle, on R. Lynn Ross's tenure, August 1970. Mt. Lady Laurier in the background.

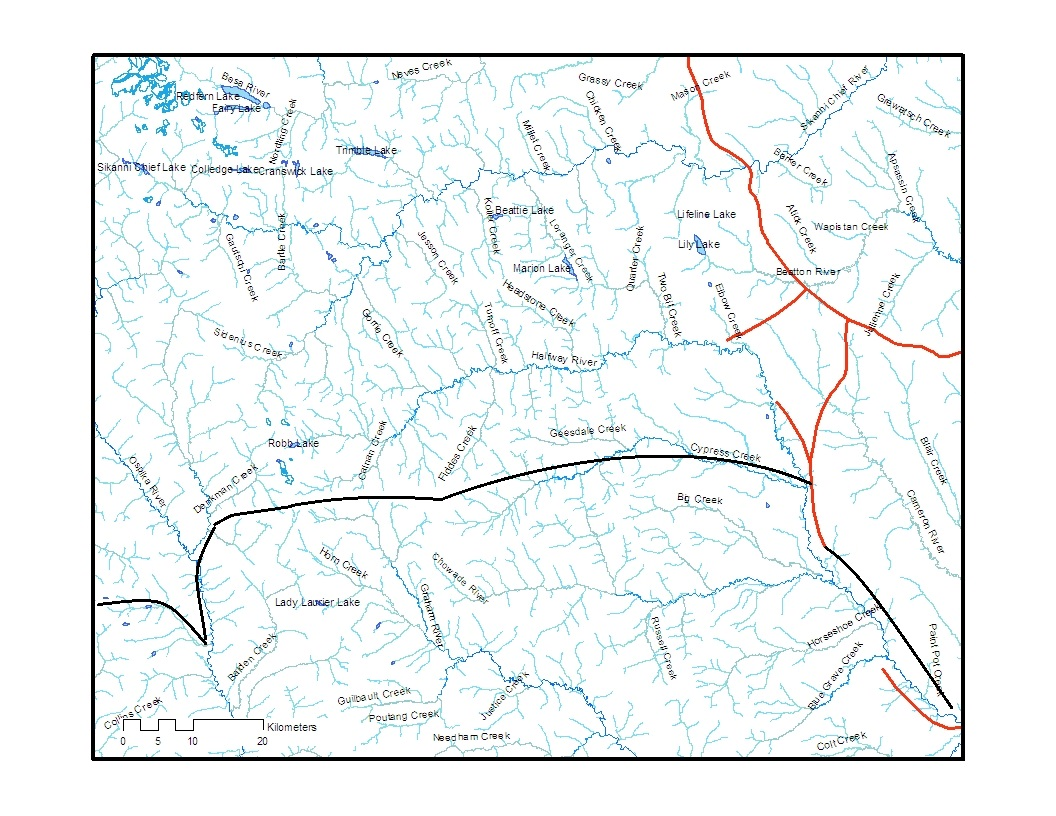
"Police Road" cut by Inspector Moodie of the NWMP in 1897 (black line). Red lines are modern roads.

Ross and his father had homesteaded the ranch some 20 years previously. Situated at the confluence of the Halfway River and Quarter Creek (formerly Two-Bit Creek, named for a famous chief of the Blueberry First Nations), the natural meadows filled with wildlife and rivers with bull trout and grayling had been a traditional spring beaver hunting and summer camping and rendezvous site for First Nations, until the Rosses homesteaded it. Ross also held the trapline tenure and annually sold just enough beaver pelts to keep his tenure.

It was illegal for Ross to release a game animal into the wild without a permit. He had been in trouble previously with the Forest Service for setting wild fires (which improve moose habitat at the expense of caribou, which require intact mature forest in winter) on Crown land and with agricultural authorities for grazing more horses on Crown Land than his permit allowed. The bison escapade ran afoul of the Wildlife Branch and in 1996 Ross finally lost his guiding license and tenure over it. The tenure is now owned by the Blueberry First Nations.

== The Police Road ==
One of Ross's trails followed the old Police Road (or Police Trail) that had been cut by Inspector J. D. Moodie and crew of the Northwest Mounted Police in 1897 up Cypress Creek (tributary to Halfway River), over Laurier Pass and down the Ospika River to Fort Graham. In 1970, this trail was still in use by Ross and his guides and clients.
