= Sikanni Old Growth Provincial Park =

Provincial park in British Columbia, Canada

- IUCN category II (national park)
- Location within British Columbia
- Interactive map of Sikanni Old Growth Provincial Park
- Location: British Columbia, Canada
- Nearest city: Fort St. John
- Coordinates: 58°14′22″N 121°42′57″W
- Area: 14.39 km^{2} (5.56 sq mi)
- Established: June 28, 1999
- Governing body: BC Parks

Sikanni Old Growth Provincial Park is a provincial park in British Columbia, Canada.
