= Chase Provincial Park =

Park in Canada

- IUCN category II (national park)
- Location within British Columbia
- Interactive map of Chase Provincial Park
- Location: Cassiar Land District, British Columbia, Canada
- Nearest city: Smithers, BC
- Coordinates: 56°30′29″N 125°01′44″W
- Area: 36,226 ha (89,520 acres)
- Established: April 11, 2001
- Governing body: BC Parks

Chase Provincial Park is a provincial park in British Columbia, Canada, located around Carina and Tomias Lakes, 70 kilometres (43 mi) north of Germansen Landing in the Omineca Mountains and just west of the Finlay Arm of Williston Lake. Approximately 32,226 hectares (124.43 sq mi), it was established in 2001.
