= Normandy Mountain =

Mountain in British Columbia, Canada

- Location within British Columbia
- Interactive map of Normandy Mountain

Highest point
- Elevation: 2,849 m (9,347 ft)
- Prominence: 924 m (3,031 ft)
- Parent peak: Dieppe Mountain
- Listing: Mountains of British Columbia
- Coordinates: 58°20′21″N 125°17′30″W

Geography
- Country: Canada
- Province: British Columbia
- District: Peace River Land District
- Parent range: Muskwa Ranges
- Topo map: NTS 94K6 Normandy Mountain

Normandy Mountain is a 2,849-metre (9,347 ft) peak in British Columbia, Canada, rising to a prominence of 924 metres (3,031 ft). Its line parent is Dieppe Mountain, 19 kilometres (12 mi) away. It is located in the Muskwa Ranges of the Canadian Rockies. The mountain was named for the Allied invasion at Normandy in June 1944 during World War II.
