= Sukunka Falls Provincial Park =

Provincial park in British Columbia, Canada

- IUCN category II (national park)
- Location within British Columbia
- Interactive map of Sukunka Falls Provincial Park
- Location: British Columbia, Canada
- Nearest city: Chetwynd
- Coordinates: 55°19′44″N 121°43′16″W
- Area: 3.6 km^{2} (1.4 sq mi)
- Established: July 30, 1981
- Governing body: BC Parks

Sukunka Falls Provincial Park is a provincial park in British Columbia, Canada. It was established in 1981, and covers a total of 1.4 square miles. There are dinosaur footprints in the park, the first of which was discovered in 2015 below the main set of falls. The park is nearest to the provincial parks of Gwillim Lake Provincial Park, Hole-in-the-Wall Provincial Park, and Pine Le Moray Provincial Park, respectively. Off-road vehicles are prohibited.

== Accessibility ==
Sukuna Falls Park is about 45 kilometers south of Chetwynd, Canada, and can be accessed by both the Chetwynd-Tumbler Ridge Highway and the Sukunka Forest Service road. At kilometer 21 on the service road there is a pullout available to visitors that provides a view of the falls, rapids and the surrounding park area.

It is suggested that park visitors use caution and keep the needed radio frequency to maintain contact with the truck traffic. When leaving the park, visitors must yield to any oncoming trucks on the service road, as it is an active one.

== Facilities ==
There are no camping facilities available, but backcountry camping is allowed. Hunting is prohibited from the park. Hiking trails exist, but they are not well-marked, with the one going down to Sukunka Falls being considered on the steep end.
