= Maxhamish Lake Provincial Park and Protected Area =

Provincial park in British Columbia, Canada

- IUCN category II (national park)
- Location within British Columbia
- Interactive map of Maxhamish Lake Provincial Park and Protected Area
- Location: British Columbia, Canada
- Nearest city: Fort Nelson
- Coordinates: 59°49′35″N 123°16′33″W
- Area: 27,516 ha (67,990 acres)
- Governing body: BC Parks

Tłu Tue - Maxhamish Lake Provincial Park and Protected Area is a 27,516-hectare (67,990-acre) provincial park in British Columbia, Canada.

The Dene people of nearby Fort Nelson First Nation (FNFN) and Acho Dene Koe (ADK) lived on the shores of Tłu Tue (fish lake), now known as Sandy Lake or Maxhamish Lake since time immemorial. Before the creation of Indian Reserves, Dene people lived here year-round or as part of a seasonal round between Nelson Forks, Dídah tthe (Pretty Hill), Tłigo ché (François) and Tłu Tue (Maxhamish Lake). One Dene elder recalls boating from Dídah tthe to Tłigo ché, walking to Tłu Tue to hunt, trap, fish and collect plants for medicines, and then walking back to Dídah tthe via overland trail. Although the main village site is on the southeastern shore, there are historical gathering places and burial sites all around the lake. Currently, the Fort Nelson First Nation has four reserve parcels around the lake to protect the grave sites, and many FNFN and ADK members have cabins they visit year round. Visitors to the area are asked to respect the lake and surrounding area, to tread lightly on its shores, and pay the land with a small offering before hunting, fishing or trapping in the area.

== Conservation ==
The protected area completely surrounds Maxhamish Lake, and offers opportunities for fishing and wildlife sightings (moose and deer are abundant). The park aims to protect arctic cisco, lake whitefish, least cisco, northern pike, slimy sculpin, spottail shiner, trout-perch, walleye, and white sucker. However, in the last fifteen years, BC's Oil & Gas industry has been conducting major operations in the area around the park. This has led to high volume industrial traffic on highway 77 (also called the 317 rd).

== Recreation ==
Available recreational activities include backcountry camping and hiking, canoeing and kayaking, fishing, and hunting.

== Location ==
The park is located in north eastern British Columbia, close to the border with Northwest Territories. Located 125 kilometres north of Fort Nelson, British Columbia.

== See also ==
- List of British Columbia Provincial Parks
- List of Canadian provincial parks
