= North Bastion Mountain =

Mountain in British Columbia, Canada

- Location within British Columbia
- Interactive map of North Bastion Mountain

Highest point
- Elevation: 2,696 m (8,845 ft)
- Prominence: 391 m (1,283 ft)
- Parent peak: The White Tower
- Listing: Mountains of British Columbia
- Coordinates: 58°26′54″N 124°58′06″W

Geography
- Country: Canada
- Province: British Columbia
- District: Peace River Land District
- Parent range: Tower of London Range
- Topo map: NTS 94K7 Wokkpash Lake

North Bastion Mountain is a 2,696-metre (8,845 ft) peak in British Columbia, Canada. Its line parent is The White Tower, 4 kilometres (2.5 mi) away. It is part of the Tower of London Range of the Muskwa Ranges in the Canadian Rockies.

North Bastion Mountain is named after the North Bastion of the Tower of London. Other mountains in the area are also named after the Tower, including The White Tower, South Bastion Mountain and Tower Mountain, which overlooks the south end of Wokkpash Lake. These names were given by the Royal Fusiliers (City of London Regiment) Canadian Rocky Mountains Expedition 1960, a small expedition with members from a regiment based in the Tower of London.

== External sources ==
- Nash, Mike (2004-05-01). Exploring Prince George: A Guide to North Central B. C. Outdoors. Rocky Mountain Books Ltd. ISBN 978-1-894765-49-7.
- "North Bastion Mountain British Columbia". Bivouac.com.
- "North Bastion Mountain". Geographical Names Data Base. Natural Resources Canada.
