= Chischa River =

- Location within Canada

Location
- Country: Canada
- Provins: British Columbia

Chischa River is a river in Canada. It is located in the province of British Columbia, in the central part of the country, 3500 km west of the capital, Ottawa.

In the area around the Chischa River grows mainly pine forests. The area around Chischa River is almost uninhabited, with less than two inhabitants per square kilometre. The neighbourhood is part of the boreal climate zones. Annual average temperature is -1 °C. The warmest month is July, when the average temperature is 14 °C, and the coldest is January, with-16 °C.

== See also ==
- List of rivers of British Columbia
