= Redfern-Keily Provincial Park =

Former provincial park in British Columbia, Canada

- IUCN category II (national park)
- Location within British Columbia
- Interactive map of Redfern-Keily Provincial Park
- Location: Peace River RD, British Columbia, Canada
- Coordinates: 57°26′N 123°57′W
- Area: 80,712 ha (311.63 sq mi)
- Established: June 29, 1999
- Governing body: BC Parks

Redfern-Keily Provincial Park is a provincial park in British Columbia, Canada. The park is part of the larger Muskwa-Kechika Management Area. It is mainly accessed via snowmobile, off-road vehicle, or horseback. Off-road vehicles must weigh under 750 kilos.

In 2024, 20-year-old Sam Benastick was lost in the park for 50 days. Fortunately, he was found alive, much to the surprise of the searchers.

== History ==
The park was established in the Muskwa Ranges of the northern Rockies, along the Besa River and its tributaries. It was named after William (Bill) Keily (born in January 1878 in Valcartier Village, Quebec). Keily was a trapper, photographer, and Wilderness Guide in the area.

== Geography ==
The centre piece of the park is the Redfern Lake, formed on the course of the Besa River. It is glacier-fed and is 8 km long and a kilometer wide. Glaciers such as the Ithaca Glacier and Achaean Glacier are also protected by this park.

== Fauna ==
Redfern-Keily Park has many different species of wildlife, both big and small. It has predators like grizzly bears, lynx and wolves roaming free-range. Other large mammals in residence are moose, caribou, stone sheep, and elk, among others.

== Facilities ==
Redfern-Keily Park is open year-round to campers and hikers. Located along the Nevis Creek/Besa River trail and the Sikanni Chief River/Trimble Lake Trail are a total of 26 wilderness campsites.

The park has one cabin, and it is located on the northeast side of Redfern Lake. It can comfortably fit 6-8 people, and runs on a first-come, first-serve basis. The cabin is maintained by the local snowmobile club.
