= Andy Bailey Provincial Park =

Provincial park in Canada

Coordinates: 58°33′N 122°30′W

Andy Bailey Provincial Park was a provincial park in British Columbia, Canada, located 28 kilometres southeast of Fort Nelson, British Columbia. The park was 196 hectares in size and aimed to protect black and white spruce forests, moose, beavers, foxes and songbirds.

Originally the Jackfish Lake Recreation Area, established by Order-in-Council in 1979, with the name changed to Andy Bailey Recreation Area in 1982. Full park status was conferred in 1999 with an area of 196 hectares. Provincial Park status was cancelled in 2004, with the property transferred to local government in 2005.

== Name origin ==
Andy Bailey Lake is named after a Fort Nelson area pioneer who cut the initial trail into the lake and later built road access. As well, Mr. Bailey was a very prominent volunteer in the Fort Nelson community. His home town is Belmond, Iowa.
