= Tetsa River =

- Location within Canada

Location
- Country: Canada
- Provins: British Columbia

Tetsa River is a river in northeastern British Columbia, Canada. It heads into the Northern Rocky Mountains Provincial Park, and flows northeast and then east into the Muskwa River. In the area around Tetsa River there are mainly pine forests. The area around Tetsa River is almost uninhabited, with less than two inhabitants per square kilometre. Highway 97 / Alaska Highway runs through this place.

The neighbourhood is part of the boreal climate zone. The annual average temperature is -0.8 °C. The warmest month is July, with an average temperature of 13.5 °C, and the coldest is January, -15.9 °C.

== Climate ==
Climate data for Tetsa River
Month	Jan	Feb	Mar	Apr	May	Jun	Jul	Aug	Sep	Oct	Nov	Dec	Year
Record high °C (°F)	16.0 (60.8)	14.5 (58.1)	15.0 (59.0)	22.0 (71.6)	28.0 (82.4)	29.0 (84.2)	31.0 (87.8)	30.5 (86.9)	25.5 (77.9)	26.0 (78.8)	14.5 (58.1)	18.0 (64.4)	31.0 (87.8)
Mean daily maximum °C (°F)	−10.9 (12.4)	−6.7 (19.9)	−1.0 (30.2)	7.2 (45.0)	12.9 (55.2)	17.7 (63.9)	19.4 (66.9)	18.3 (64.9)	12.7 (54.9)	5.3 (41.5)	−6.6 (20.1)	−8.5 (16.7)	5.0 (41.0)
Daily mean °C (°F)	−15.9 (3.4)	−12.9 (8.8)	−7.8 (18.0)	0.8 (33.4)	6.6 (43.9)	11.5 (52.7)	13.5 (56.3)	12.1 (53.8)	6.8 (44.2)	0.0 (32.0)	−11.3 (11.7)	−13.3 (8.1)	−0.8 (30.6)
Mean daily minimum °C (°F)	−20.8 (−5.4)	−19.1 (−2.4)	−14.5 (5.9)	−5.6 (21.9)	0.3 (32.5)	5.3 (41.5)	7.6 (45.7)	5.8 (42.4)	1.0 (33.8)	−5.3 (22.5)	−15.9 (3.4)	−18.1 (−0.6)	−6.6 (20.1)
Record low °C (°F)	−41.0 (−41.8)	−41.0 (−41.8)	−37.0 (−34.6)	−28.0 (−18.4)	−16.5 (2.3)	−2.0 (28.4)	0.0 (32.0)	−6.0 (21.2)	−11.0 (12.2)	−30.0 (−22.0)	−45.0 (−49.0)	−39.0 (−38.2)	−45.0 (−49.0)
Average precipitation mm (inches)	24.9 (0.98)	21.2 (0.83)	29.9 (1.18)	30.7 (1.21)	82.0 (3.23)	116.0 (4.57)	150.7 (5.93)	106.9 (4.21)	61.0 (2.40)	40.3 (1.59)	26.1 (1.03)	17.9 (0.70)	707.7 (27.86)
Average rainfall mm (inches)	0.1 (0.00)	0.0 (0.0)	0.0 (0.0)	4.3 (0.17)	60.9 (2.40)	115.5 (4.55)	150.7 (5.93)	104.9 (4.13)	51.7 (2.04)	4.8 (0.19)	0.0 (0.0)	0.0 (0.0)	493.0 (19.41)
Average snowfall cm (inches)	24.9 (9.8)	21.2 (8.3)	29.9 (11.8)	26.3 (10.4)	21.0 (8.3)	0.5 (0.2)	0.0 (0.0)	2.0 (0.8)	9.3 (3.7)	35.5 (14.0)	26.1 (10.3)	17.9 (7.0)	214.7 (84.5)
Average precipitation days	7.3	6.6	7.1	6.8	13.1	16	19.6	14.6	11.7	8.0	7.7	5.8	124.2
Average rainy days	0.04	0	0	1.5	10.8	16.0	19.6	14.4	10.3	2.2	0.04	0	74.9
Average snowy days	7.2	6.6	7.1	5.7	3.4	0.14	0	0.36	2.0	6.4	7.7	5.8	52.3
Source: Environment Canada

== See also ==
- List of rivers of British Columbia
