= Prophet River, British Columbia =

Dunne-za reserve in British Columbia

Coordinates: 58°5′29.28″N 122°42′34.45″W

Prophet River is a First Nations reserve community of the Dunne-za (Beaver) people in northeastern British Columbia, Canada, located at Mile 233 on Highway 97, the Alaska Highway, about 54 miles south of Fort Nelson. The community observes Mountain Standard Time year-round, as does Fort Nelson since November 1, 2015.
