= Mount Lloyd George =

Mountain in British Columbia, Canada

- Location within British Columbia
- Interactive map of Mount Lloyd George

Highest point
- Elevation: 2,938 m (9,639 ft)
- Prominence: 1,208 m (3,963 ft)
- Parent peak: Mount Sylvia
- Listing: Mountains of British Columbia
- Coordinates: 57°53′44″N 124°59′53″W

Geography
- Country: Canada
- Province: British Columbia
- District: Peace River Land District
- Parent range: Muskwa Ranges; Northern Rocky Mountains
- Topo map: NTS 94F15 Mount Lloyd George

Climbing
- First ascent: 17 July 1947, Noel Odell, Frank Smythe, Henry S. Hall Jr, Rex Gibson, John H. Ross, David Wessel

Mount Lloyd George is a 2,938-metre (9,639 ft) peak in British Columbia, Canada, rising to a prominence of 1,208 metres (3,963 ft) above Lloyd George Pass. The mountain is located NE of Haworth Lake in Kwadacha Wilderness Provincial Park. Its line parent is Mount Sylvia, 37 kilometres (23 mi) away. It is part of the Northern Rocky Mountains.

== Geology ==
Lying in the Muskwa Ranges, Mount Lloyd George is a castellated limestone and quartzite peak. The diamictite sedimentary deposits of the mountain, several kilometers thick, date to the late Precambrian and probably have a glacial-marine origin. The age of the diamictite is not certain. It may be associated with either the Toby or the Vreeland formations of the North American Cordillera.

== Ice field ==
The Lloyd George Icefield in 1998 covered over 70 square kilometres (27 sq mi). There is a major concentration of glaciers around the mountain. The icefield is about 19 kilometres (12 mi) from north to south and 13 kilometres (8.1 mi) from east to west, bounded by the Warneford River and the Tuchodi River. The small Llanberis Glacier flows west from the icefield to Hawarth Lake. The larger Kwadacha and Lloyd George glaciers drain the icefield to the east.

== Name ==
The mountain was named by Paul Leland Haworth after David Lloyd George, the British Prime Minister towards the end of World War I. In the words of Raymond M. Patterson,

It has been said, and with some truth, that the Rockies are the worst named mountain system in the world... Haworth, in a fit of wartime enthusiasm, decided to suggest that one further alien name be added to the ill-assorted register: as soon as he got out he would propose to Ottawa that the high mountain he had seen that day, holding the Great Glacier in its lap, should be called Mount Lloyd George. With regrettable haste his suggestion was adopted. Time and the verdict of history have not added to the stature of the little Welsh politician.
