= Fort Nelson River =

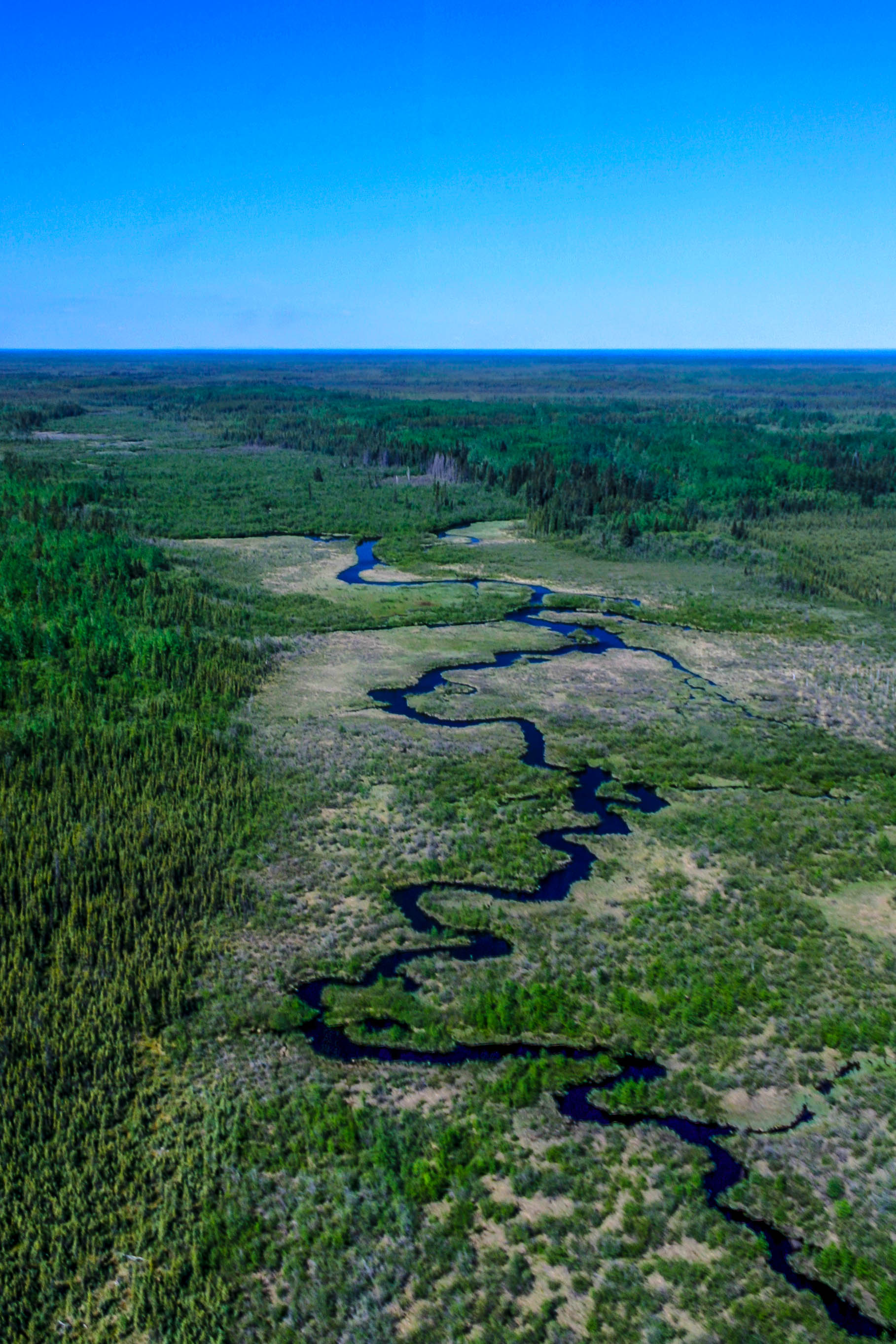

Location
- Country: Canada
- Province: British Columbia
- District: Peace River Land District

Physical characteristics
- Source
  - location: Forks of Sikanni Chief River and Fontas River; 58.28543°N 121.75355°W
  - elevation: 360 m (1,180 ft)
- Mouth
  - location: Liard River; 59.54639°N 123.99432°W
  - elevation: 260 m (850 ft)
- Length: 517 km (321 mi)
- Basin size: 55,900 km^{2} (21,600 sq mi)
- Discharge
  - average: 331.9 m^{3}/s (11,720 cu ft/s)

The Fort Nelson River, often shortened to simply the Nelson River, is in north-eastern British Columbia, Canada. It flows 517 kilometres (321 mi) generally north-westward to the Liard River, a tributary of the Mackenzie River, which empties into the Arctic Ocean. The river drains a watershed of 55,900 square kilometres (21,600 mi^{2}) and is formed by the confluence of the Fontas River flowing from the east, and the Sikanni Chief River flowing from the south. These, along with the Sahtaneh and Muskwa Rivers, constitute the major tributaries. The source of the Sikanni Chief, on the eastern slope of the Rocky Mountains, is ultimately the headwater of the Fort Nelson River.

The land through which the river flows is generally flat, a mixture of boreal forests and muskeg. The area is rich in wildlife, and forestry and mining (especially oil and gas) are major industries.

== History ==
The river has a rich history. The Dene and Sekani First Nations used it for food and trade. The river itself is named for the town of Fort Nelson, established in 1805 by the North West Company as a fur trading post near the river's junction with the Muskwa River. With the abandonment of the village and trading post at Nelson Forks and Fort Nelson's relocation roughly eight kilometres southwest up the Muskwa River to better access the Alaska Highway built in the 1940s, there are no longer any communities along this river.

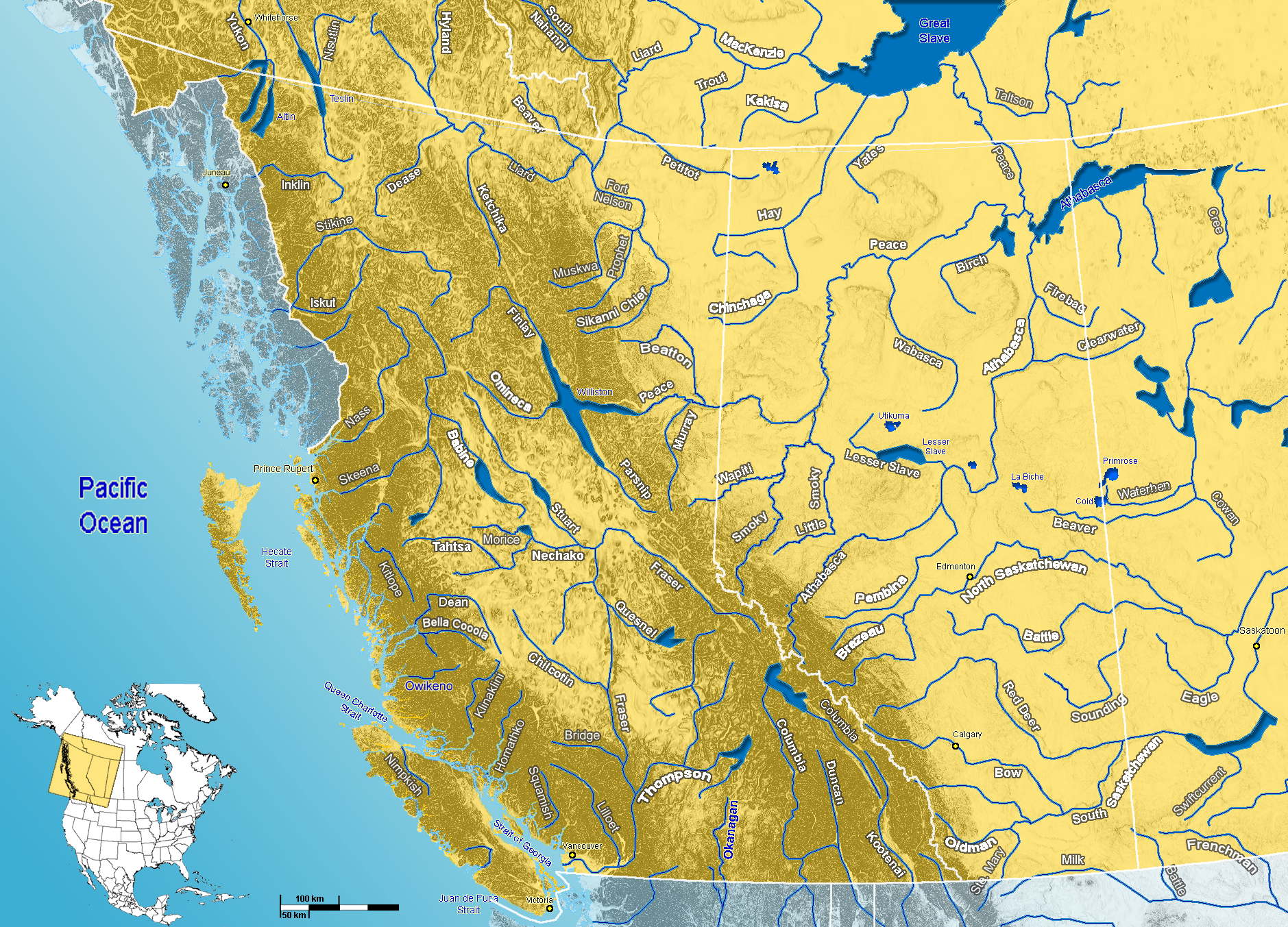
Fort Nelson River

The Fort Nelson River is formed at the confluence of Sikanni Chief River and Fontas River, at an elevation of 360 metres (1,180 ft). It flows north-west and north, and its course is paralleled by BC Rail tracks north of Fontas. It receives waters from the Elleh Creek and Klua Creek, then follows a north-west direction, a short distance from Andy Bailey Provincial Park. It turns north again near Fort Nelson, where the Muskwa River flows into it.

Further north it receives the McConachie Creek, Cridland Creek and Sahtaneh River, which also carries waters from the Snake River. It then turns north-west and west, where it receives the Shush Creek, Onion Creek, Tsimeh Creek, Stanolind Creek and Kiwigana River. It is then crossed by the Liard Highway and continues westwards, receiving waters from Tsoo Creek, Etane Creek, Obole Creek and Capot-Blanc Creek. It flows into the Liard River at Nelson Forks, at an elevation of 260 metres (850 ft).

Its waters are carried up the Liard River then the Mackenzie River, into the Arctic Ocean.

== Local disagreement ==
Locally, particularly among the Dene and Cree population of Fort Nelson First Nation it is taught that the Fort Nelson River is not formed by the confluence of the Fontas and Sikinni Chief Rivers, but is instead formed further downriver by the Sikinni Chief's meeting with the larger Muskwa River, notably the former location of Fort Nelson, the community from which the river takes its name. The site was largely abandoned in favour of the community's current location and the nearby Fort Nelson First Nation reserve in the decades following the Second World War as the Alaska Highway usurped the river systems' place as the area's prime means of transportation. The discrepancy in beliefs is believed to trace back to the various surveyors who explored the land in the 19th and early 20th centuries, their work developing into the official view of the Fort Nelson River and its course, which can be seen on most maps and other documentation today, though the official view is often ignored locally.

== Tributaries ==
From headwaters to mouth, the Fort Nelson River receives the following tributaries:

- Sikanni Chief River
- Fontas River
- Elleh Creek
- Klua Creek
- Muskwa River
- McConachie Creek
- Cridland Creek
- Snake River
  - Hoffard Creek
  - Chuatse Creek
  - Utahn Creek
  - Sahtaneh River
    - Lichen Creek
    - Gunnell Creek
    - Courvoisier Creek
    - Komie Creek
- Shush Creek
- Onion Creek
- Tsimeh Creek
- Stanolind Creek
- Kiwigana River
- Tsoo Creek
- Etane Creek
- Obole Creek
- Capot-Blanc Creek

== See also ==
- List of rivers of British Columbia
