= Northern Rocky Mountains Provincial Park =

Provincial park in British Columbia, Canada

- IUCN category Ib (wilderness area)
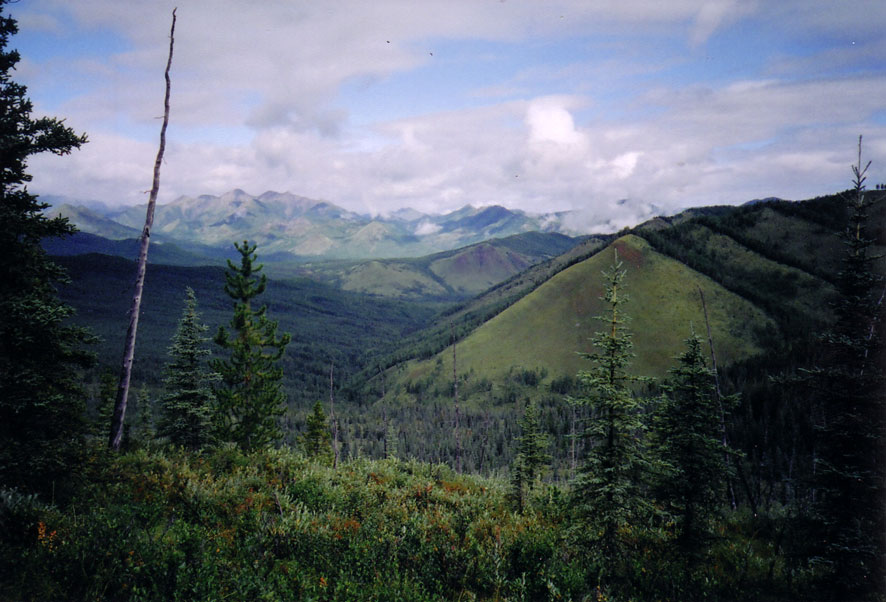
- View towards the Tuchodi River Valley

- Location within British Columbia
- Interactive map of Northern Rocky Mountains Provincial Park
- Location: Northern Rockies RM, British Columbia, Canada
- Nearest city: Fort Nelson
- Coordinates: 58°13′16″N 124°21′12″W
- Area: 6,657.1 km^{2} (2,570.3 sq mi)
- Elevation: 2,936 ft (895 m)
- Established: June 1999
- Governing body: BC Parks

Northern Rocky Mountains Provincial Park is a provincial park in British Columbia, Canada. It is located in the north-eastern part of the province, 90 km south-west from Fort Nelson and it is bordered to the north by the Alaska Highway. Access is mostly done by boat, aircraft, on horseback or by hiking.

At 6,657.1 km^{2}, it is the largest protected area in the Muskwa-Kechika Management Area and the third largest provincial park in British Columbia. The park borders Stone Mountain Provincial Park to the north-west and Kwadacha Wilderness Provincial Park to the south-west, creating a large contiguous protected area in the Muskwa Ranges of the Canadian Rockies.

== History ==
Northern Rockies Mountain Provincial Park is the largest protected site within the Muskwa-Kechika Management Area, a wilderness area established in 1998. The park is among seven sites that are recommended to be protected by the 1997 Fort Nelson Land and Resource Management Plan due to its unique ecological diversity.

The park is established in December 1986. In June 1999, the park was expanded with the inclusion of the Wokkpash Recreational Area to protect the ecological heritages of the area.

In 2000, a public advisory group was formed to initiate a management planning process for the park. The process was suspended for several years due to the need of increasing participation of Indigenous people but has been resumed since 2019. The public, stakeholder, and the First Nations were all included for the update of the plan. This allowed public to give extra information through mails, online forms, meeting and open houses. All information were gathered on the webpage and was used to draft the final management plan.

== Geography ==
The area is notable for a range of water features including rivers, streams, waterfalls, rapids, small glaciers and lakes. Its rivers include the Tetsa, Chischa, and Muskwa, and its creeks include the Gathto, Kluachesi, Dead Dog and Chlotapecta.

The largest water features in the area are the upper and lower Tuckodi Lakes, though other lakes such as Kluachesi and Tetsa exist.

== Ecology ==
There are different kinds of animals at risk in Rocky Mountain National Park; at the same time, the park is also suitable for other species to live, as a habitat. It provides great environment for animals including moose, elk, stone sheep, and mountain goats.

Grizzly bears and black bears are also commonly found in the area. The existence of different prey animals allow these bears to sustain within the habitat. Different types of species live around the park, including animals, plants, and others. More plants can be found rather than animals.

Types of animals are included with mammals, birds, fish, and amphibians & reptiles. Plants are included with algae, lichens, mosses & liverworts, trees & shrubs and wildflowers. Lake trout, rainbow trout, bull trout, arctic grayling and lake whitefish are the important species in the park.

== Climate change ==
The remoteness and wilderness of Northern Rocky Mountains Provincial Park has made it potentially an area for the plants and species to adapt to climate change. Nevertheless, projection has indicated that the temperature and humidity within the park will likely increase in the future.

Climate change will impact certain aspects of the ecological system of the park. The boreal forest permafrost faces a greater threat of melting. Shrub zones could expand due to trees moving to upper elevations and reduction of Boreal Altai Fescue Alpine BEC subzone. The remaining subzone, however, could be a refuge area for at-risk ecological communities.

== Visitors, activities and facilities ==
In the last 20 years, over 10,000 students and teachers came to the park each year and joined into Rocky's Education and Outreach Program, and the number is continuously going up.

By taking activities like field trips and lectures, students can learn more about the ecology, wildlife, history and culture of this park. A range of activities is welcome, though most opportunities require experience in and knowledge of the wilderness.

=== Activities ===
Available activities that are offered at Northern Rocky Mountain Park are:

Activity	Notes
Canoeing	Recommended for experienced paddlers. Planning is necessary.
Climbing	Climbing areas are available to mountaineers.
Fishing	Those with a licence may catch lake trout, rainbow trout, bull trout, Arctic grayling and lake whitefish, among others.
Hiking	Designated trails available. Signs should be heeded.
Horseback riding	No designated trails; riders should be experienced.
Hunting	Hunting excursions available by private companies; regulations exist and must be followed.
Pets on leash	Pets are welcome but must be leashed. They should not be brought to backcountry areas due to wildlife.
Wildlife viewing	Black bears, grizzly bears, elk, caribou, goats, Stone sheep, wolf and deer may all be spotted.
Winter recreation	Snowmobiling is possible in the winter.

=== Facilities ===
Available facilities that can be used at the park are:

Facilities	Notes
Campfires	Campfires should be kept small.
Walk-In/Wilderness Camping	Wilderness camping is welcome but no facilities are available. Primitive campsites exist but are unlikely to be maintained.

== See also ==
- List of British Columbia Provincial Parks
