= Wokkpash Lake =

Lake in British Columbia, Canada

- Location within British Columbia
- Coordinates: 58°26′41″N 124°51′37″W
- Primary inflows: Wokkpash Creek
- Primary outflows: Wokkpash Creek
- Basin countries: Canada
- Max. length: 6 km (3.7 mi)
- Max. width: 1 km (0.62 mi)

Wokkpash Lake is a lake in the Canadian Rockies in northeast British Columbia, Canada. It is about 140 kilometres (87 mi) west of Fort Nelson along the Alaska Highway.

== Location ==
The lake lies on the Wokkpash creek. The Wokkpash Valley has dramatic scenery, including imposing stone erosion pillars, called hoodoos. The Wokkpash Canyon, below the lake, runs between high cliffs for 5 kilometres (3.1 mi). The creek enters the Racing River below the lake. The creek is accessible to kayakers via a 4x4 trail. The lake is surrounded by the peaks of the Muskwa Ranges, including 2,700 metres (8,900 ft) peaks such as The White Tower, North Bastion Mountain and Mount St. Sepulchre. Many of these peaks were named by a 1960 expedition by members of the British Royal Fusiliers, based in the Tower of London, and the names reflect parts of the Tower, and the expedition sponsors.

== Environment ==
Heavy rainfall is common in the region, often lasting for several days, and this can cause flash floods in the creeks. Wildlife in the region includes grizzly bear, black bears, moose, elk, caribou, mountain goats, stone sheep, wolves, deer, martens, fishers, weasels and wolverines. The environment is fragile due to the harsh winter conditions and short growing season.

== Access ==
The lake lies within the Wokkpash Recreation Area in the Muskwa-Kechika Management Area, which also includes the Northern Rocky Mountains Provincial Park, Stone Mountain Provincial Park and Kwadacha Wilderness Provincial Park. The Wokkpash area is part of the Northern Rocky Mountains Park. There is a public use cabin at the south end of the Lake. Access is via hiking along the Wokkpash Trail. The trail is basically just an unmarked route along old guide and game trails. It should only be used by experienced and well-equipped backpackers.

== See also ==
- List of lakes of British Columbia
