= Muskwa Ranges =

Subrange of the Northern Canadian Rockies in British Columbia, Canada

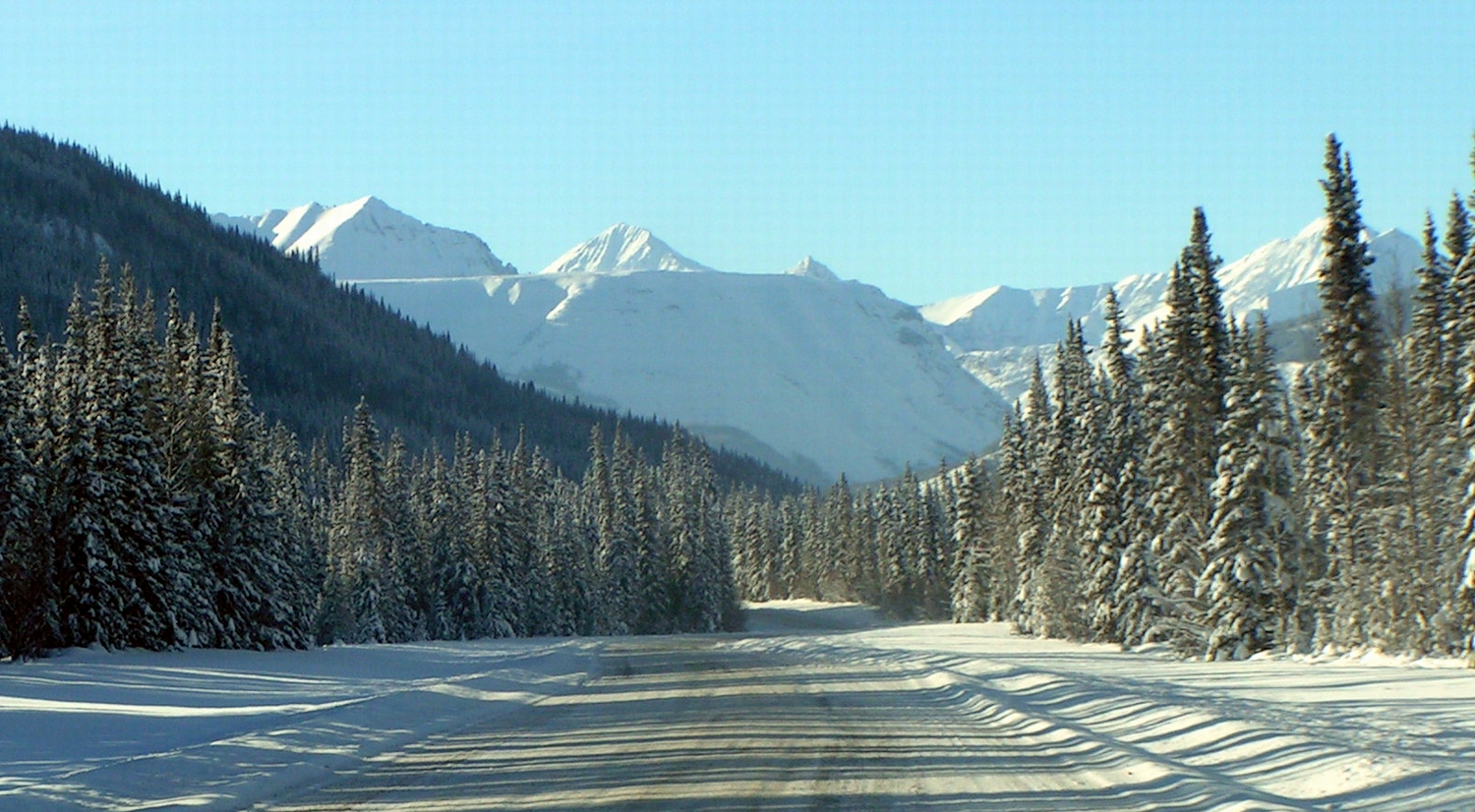
- The Alaska Highway crossing the Muskwa Ranges

Highest point
- Peak: Mount Ulysses
- Elevation: 3,024 m (9,921 ft)
- Listing: Ranges of the Canadian Rockies
- Coordinates: 57°20′47″N 124°05′34″W

Dimensions
- Area: 97,388 km^{2} (37,602 mi^{2})

Geography
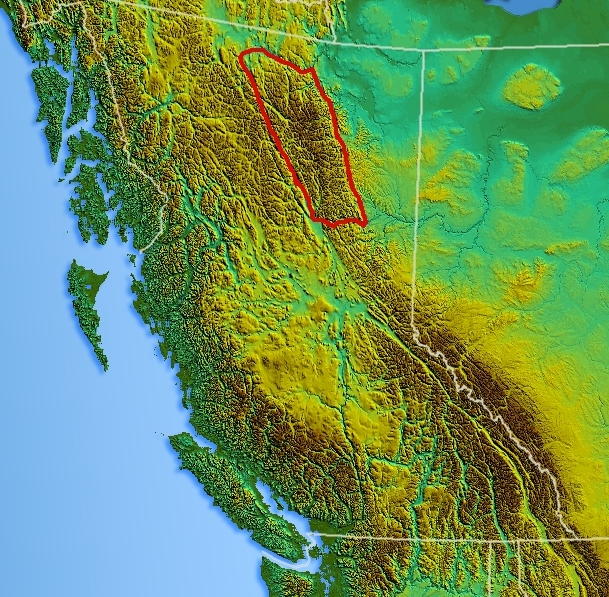
- Location map of Muskwa Ranges
- Country: Canada
- Province: British Columbia
- Range coordinates: 58°00′00″N 125°00′00″W
- Parent range: Canadian Rockies
- Topo map: NTS 94F8 Cyclops Peak

The Muskwa Ranges are a group of mountain ranges in northern British Columbia, Canada. They are part of the Northern Rockies section of the Rocky Mountains and are bounded on their west by the Rocky Mountain Trench and on their east by the Rocky Mountain Foothills. They are delimited on the north by the Liard River and on the south by the Peace Reach of the Lake Williston reservoir (formerly the Peace River), south of which the next major grouping of the Rockies is the Hart Ranges.

The Muskwa Ranges cover a surface of 97,388 square kilometres (37,602 mi^{2}) and stretch for 424 kilometres (263 mi) from north to south.

== Mountains and peaks ==
Peak	Elevation (m/ft)	
Mount Ulysses	3,024	9,921
Mount Sylvia	2,940	9,650
Mount Lloyd George	2,938	9,639
Great Rock Peak	2,929	9,610
Mount Roosevelt	2,814	9,232
Great Snow Mountain	2,813	9,229
Mount Peck	2,807	9,209
Churchill Peak	2,770	9,090
Yedhe Mountain	2,717	8,914
Gataga Peak	2,533	8,310

== Sub-ranges ==
- Allied Leaders Range
- Akie Range
- Battle of Britain Range
- Deserters Range
- Gataga Ranges
- Italy Range
- Rabbit Plateau
- Sentinel Range
- Stone Range
- Terminal Range
- Tochieka Range
- Tower of London Range
- Truncate Range

== See also ==
- Ranges of the Canadian Rockies
