= Smith River =

Smith River may refer to:

== Rivers ==
=== Canada ===
- Smith River (Liard River tributary), British Columbia
- Smith River (Montmorency River tributary), Québec
  - Petite rivière Smith, a tributary

=== Jamaica ===
- Smith River (Jamaica)

=== United States ===
- Smith River (California)
  - North Fork Smith River (California), that begins in Oregon
- Smith River (Montana)
- Smith River (Pemigewasset River tributary), New Hampshire
- Smith River (Umpqua River tributary), Oregon
- Smith River (McKenzie River tributary), Oregon
- Smith River (Virginia), in Virginia and North Carolina

== Places ==
- Smith River, British Columbia, Canada
- Smith River, California, United States
