= Henderson Lake =

Henderson Lake or Lake Henderson may refer to:

- Henderson Lake (New York), a lake in the Adirondacks which is considered to be the official source and start of the Hudson River
- Henderson Lake (Florida), one of the Tsala Apopka Lakes of the Withlacoochee River in Citrus County, Florida.
- Henderson Lake (British Columbia), the former name of Hucuktlis Lake, a lake on Vancouver Island that drains south into head of Uchucklesit Inlet on the north side of lower Alberni Inlet
- Henderson Lake (Sudbury District), a lake in Sudbury District, Ontario
- Henderson Lake (Hastings County), a lake in Hastings County, Ontario
- Henderson Lake (Timiskaming District), a lake in Timiskaming District, Ontario
- Henderson Lake (GTP Block 2 Township, Thunder Bay District), a lake in GTP Block 2 Township, Thunder Bay District, Ontario
- Henderson Lake (Schmoo Lake, Thunder Bay District), a tributary of Schmoo Lake, Thunder Bay District, Ontario
- Henderson Lake (Bell Township, Thunder Bay District), a lake in Bell Township, Thunder Bay District, Ontario
- Lake Henderson (New Zealand), a lake in the Tasman District
