= Temperature in Canada =

Köppen climate classification types of Canada

Climate in Canada varies widely from region to region. In many parts of the country, particularly in the interior and Prairie provinces, winters are long, very cold, and feature frequent snow. Most of Canada has a continental climate, which features a large annual range of temperatures, cold winters, and warm summers. Daily average temperatures are near −15 °C (5 °F), but can drop below −50 °C (−58 °F) with severe wind chills. In non-coastal regions, snow can cover the ground for almost six months of the year, while in parts of the north snow can persist year-round. Coastal British Columbia has a more temperate climate, with a mild and rainy, cloudy winter. The British Columbia Southern interior has a semi-desert climate in many locations, with long warm to hot, dry summers, and short moderate winters. The immediate area adjacent to the town of Ashcroft, features Canada's only true desert. On the east and west coasts, average summer high temperatures are generally in the low 20s °C, while between the coasts, the average summer high temperature ranges from 25 to 30 °C (77 to 86 °F), with temperatures in some interior locations occasionally exceeding 40 °C (104 °F).

Much of Northern Canada is covered by ice and permafrost; however, the future of the permafrost is uncertain because the Arctic has been warming at three times the global average as a result of climate change in Canada. Canada's annual average temperature over land has warmed by 1.7 °C (3.1 °F), with changes ranging from 1.1 to 2.3 °C (2.0 to 4.1 °F) in various regions, since 1948. The rate of warming has been higher across the North and in the Prairies. In the southern regions of Canada, air pollution from both Canada and the United States—caused by metal smelting, burning coal to power utilities, and vehicle emissions—has resulted in acid rain, which has severely impacted waterways, forest growth and agricultural productivity in Canada.

== Averages ==
The following tables show the average maximum and minimum temperatures of Canada of various cities across Canada, based on the climate period from 1981 to 2010 for the months of January and July (generally the lowest and highest average temperature months, but not in every case).

The two major Canadian cities that fall outside the continental climate schema are Vancouver and Victoria. Vancouver experiences an oceanic climate, bordering warm-summer mediterranean with a marked summer dry season. Victoria, BC is the only major Canadian city entirely in a warm-summer mediterranean climate. Of the eight largest Canadian cities, Ottawa, Montreal and Toronto have the warmest summers, Winnipeg the coldest winters, while Vancouver's winters are far milder than any other large city in Canada.

In mountainous regions such as British Columbia the variety of elevations creates micro-climates with average temperatures that can vary wildly within relatively small distances. A few small towns in southern BC outside of Vancouver, for example, have a humid continental climate (Dfb) with average winter temperatures and cold snaps comparable to other parts of the country.

Central Canada and northern Canada experiences subarctic and Arctic climates, much of them arid. Those areas are not heavily populated due to the severe climate, where it drops below −20 °C (−4 °F) on most winter days and has a very brief summer season.

Some Mountain passes in southern BC also have a subarctic or subalpine climate, creating extremely dangerous driving conditions, as drivers may be unaware of wintry road conditions when they come from nearby areas like Vancouver and Kamloops which is semi-desert, that are much warmer.

The table can be reordered by clicking on the box in each column. Places in italics are provincial capitals, bold is the national capital.

Community	Weather station	Location	Elevation	January Avg. high °C (°F)	January Avg. low °C (°F)	July Avg. high °C (°F)	July Avg. low °C (°F)	Annual Avg. high °C (°F)	Annual Avg. low °C (°F)
Alberton, PE		46°51′00″N 064°01′00″W	3 m (9.8 ft)	−3.9 (25.0)	−12.5 (9.5)	23.2 (73.8)	14.1 (57.4)	9.6 (49.3)	1.3 (34.3)
Baker Lake, NU	YBK	64°17′56″N 096°04′40″W	18.6 m (61 ft)	−27.7 (−17.9)	−34.8 (−30.6)	17.0 (62.6)	6.1 (43.0)	−7.3 (18.9)	−15.2 (4.6)
Baie-Comeau, QC	YBC	49°08′00″N 068°12′00″W	22 m (72 ft)	−8.7 (16.3)	−19.9 (−3.8)	20.9 (69.6)	10.3 (50.5)	6.6 (43.9)	−3.3 (26.1)
Calgary, AB	YYC	51°06′50″N 114°01′13″W	1,084 m (3,556 ft)	−0.9 (30.4)	−13.2 (8.2)	23.2 (73.8)	9.8 (49.6)	10.8 (51.4)	−1.9 (28.6)
Charlottetown, PE	YYG	46°17′19″N 063°07′43″W	49 m (161 ft)	−3.4 (25.9)	−12.1 (10.2)	23.3 (73.9)	14.1 (57.4)	9.9 (49.8)	1.3 (34.3)
Churchill, MB	YYQ	58°44′21″N 094°03′59″W	29 m (95 ft)	−21.9 (−7.4)	−30.1 (−22.2)	18.0 (64.4)	7.3 (45.1)	−2.3 (27.9)	−10.7 (12.7)
Corner Brook, NL		48°57′00″N 057°57′00″W	5 m (16 ft)	−2.7 (27.1)	−9.6 (14.7)	22.0 (71.6)	12.6 (54.7)	9.0 (48.2)	1.3 (34.3)
Dawson City, YT	YDA	64°02′35″N 139°07′40″W	370 m (1,210 ft)	−21.8 (−7.2)	−30.1 (−22.2)	23.1 (73.6)	8.2 (46.8)	2.1 (35.8)	−10.3 (13.5)
Edmonton, AB	YXD	53°34′24″N 113°31′06″W	671 m (2,201 ft)	−6.0 (21.2)	−14.8 (5.4)	23.1 (73.6)	12.3 (54.1)	9.3 (48.7)	−1.0 (30.2)
Edmundston, NB		47°20′47″N 068°11′16″W	163 m (535 ft)	−7.1 (19.2)	−18.5 (−1.3)	24.7 (76.5)	11.5 (52.7)	9.5 (49.1)	−2.3 (27.9)
Fort Nelson, BC	YYE	58°50′11″N 122°35′50″W	382 m (1,253 ft)	−16.1 (3.0)	−24.6 (−12.3)	23.2 (73.8)	10.9 (51.6)	5.2 (41.4)	−6.0 (21.2)
Fredericton, NB	YFC	45°52′20″N 066°31′40″W	21 m (69 ft)	−3.8 (25.2)	−15.0 (5.0)	25.5 (77.9)	13.0 (55.4)	11.4 (52.5)	−0.2 (31.6)
Halifax, NS	YHZ	44°52′48″N 063°30′00″W	145 m (476 ft)	−1.3 (29.7)	−10.4 (13.3)	23.8 (74.8)	13.7 (56.7)	11.3 (52.3)	1.9 (35.4)
High Level, AB	YOJ	58°37′17″N 117°09′53″W	338 m (1,109 ft)	−15.0 (5.0)	−25.8 (−14.4)	23.0 (73.4)	9.9 (49.8)	5.2 (41.4)	−7.2 (19.0)
Inuvik, NT	YEV	68°18′15″N 133°28′58″W	68 m (223 ft)	−22.8 (−9.0)	−31.0 (−23.8)	19.5 (67.1)	8.6 (47.5)	−3.5 (25.7)	−12.9 (8.8)
Iqaluit, NU	YFB	63°45′00″N 068°33′00″W	34 m (112 ft)	−22.8 (−9.0)	−30.9 (−23.6)	12.3 (54.1)	4.1 (39.4)	−5.6 (21.9)	−13.1 (8.4)
Kamloops, BC	YKA	50°42′08″N 120°26′31″W	345.3 m (1,133 ft)	0.4 (32.7)	−5.9 (21.4)	28.9 (84.0)	14.2 (57.6)	14.8 (58.6)	3.7 (38.7)
Kugluktuk, NU	YCO	67°49′00″N 115°08′38″W	23 m (75 ft)	−23.2 (−9.8)	−31.4 (−24.5)	15.6 (60.1)	6.1 (43.0)	−6.1 (21.0)	−14.4 (6.1)
La Ronge, SK	YVC	55°09′00″N 105°16′00″W	379 m (1,243 ft)	−13.4 (7.9)	−24.2 (−11.6)	23.5 (74.3)	11.5 (52.7)	5.9 (42.6)	−5.5 (22.1)
Mayo, YT	YMA	63°37′00″N 135°52′00″W	504 m (1,654 ft)	−18.0 (−0.4)	−28.2 (−18.8)	22.8 (73.0)	9.4 (48.9)	3.4 (38.1)	−8.2 (17.2)
Moncton, NB	YQM	46°06′19″N 064°41′02″W	71 m (233 ft)	−3.7 (25.3)	−14.0 (6.8)	24.7 (76.5)	12.9 (55.2)	10.7 (51.3)	0.1 (32.2)
Montreal, QC	YUL	45°28′00″N 073°45′00″W	36 m (118 ft)	−5.3 (22.5)	−14.0 (6.8)	26.3 (79.3)	16.1 (61.0)	11.5 (52.7)	2.0 (35.6)
Nain, NL	YDP	56°33′00″N 061°41′00″W	6 m (20 ft)	−13.5 (7.7)	−21.6 (−6.9)	14.9 (58.8)	5.3 (41.5)	1.7 (35.1)	−6.6 (20.1)
Norman Wells, NT	YVQ	65°16′57″N 126°48′01″W	73 m (240 ft)	−22.2 (−8.0)	−29.9 (−21.8)	22.5 (72.5)	11.5 (52.7)	−0.4 (31.3)	−9.9 (14.2)
Ottawa, ON	YOW	45°19′21″N 075°40′09″W	114 m (374 ft)	−5.8 (21.6)	−14.8 (5.4)	26.5 (79.7)	15.5 (59.9)	11.3 (52.3)	1.4 (34.5)
Princeton, BC	CYDC	49°28′05″N 120°30′41″W	700 m (2,300 ft)	−1.4 (29.5)	−8.6 (16.5)	26.3 (79.3)	9.5 (49.1)	12.9 (55.2)	0.2 (32.4)
Quebec City, QC	YQB	46°48′00″N 071°23′00″W	74 m (243 ft)	−7.9 (17.8)	−17.7 (0.1)	25.0 (77.0)	13.5 (56.3)	9.2 (48.6)	−0.8 (30.6)
Regina, SK	YQR	50°26′00″N 104°40′00″W	578 m (1,896 ft)	−9.3 (15.3)	−20.1 (−4.2)	25.8 (78.4)	11.9 (53.4)	9.3 (48.7)	−3.2 (26.2)
Resolute, NU	YRB	74°43′01″N 094°58′10″W	68 m (223 ft)	−28.6 (−19.5)	−35.3 (−31.5)	7.3 (45.1)	1.7 (35.1)	−12.7 (9.1)	−18.6 (−1.5)
Saskatoon, SK	YXE	52°10′00″N 106°43′00″W	504 m (1,654 ft)	−10.1 (13.8)	−20.7 (−5.3)	25.3 (77.5)	11.6 (52.9)	8.6 (47.5)	−3.5 (25.7)
St. John's, NL	YYT	47°37′20″N 052°44′34″W	141 m (463 ft)	−0.8 (30.6)	−8.2 (17.2)	20.7 (69.3)	10.9 (51.6)	9.0 (48.2)	1.0 (33.8)
Summerside, PE	YSU	46°26′20″N 063°49′54″W	20 m (66 ft)	−3.2 (26.2)	−12.1 (10.2)	23.8 (74.8)	14.6 (58.3)	9.9 (49.8)	1.6 (34.9)
Sydney, NS	YQY	46°10′00″N 060°02′53″W	62 m (203 ft)	−1.1 (30.0)	−9.6 (14.7)	23.1 (73.6)	12.6 (54.7)	10.3 (50.5)	1.4 (34.5)
Thompson, MB	YTH	55°48′12″N 097°51′45″W	224 m (735 ft)	−18.3 (−0.9)	−29.3 (−20.7)	23.1 (73.6)	9.1 (48.4)	3.4 (38.1)	−9.1 (15.6)
Timmins, ON	YTS	48°34′11″N 081°22′36″W	295 m (968 ft)	−10.6 (12.9)	−23.0 (−9.4)	24.2 (75.6)	10.7 (51.3)	7.9 (46.2)	−4.3 (24.3)
Toronto, ON	YYZ	43°40′38″N 079°37′50″W	173 m (568 ft)	−1.5 (29.3)	−9.4 (15.1)	27.1 (80.8)	15.8 (60.4)	13.0 (55.4)	3.3 (37.9)
Vancouver, BC	YVR	49°11′42″N 123°10′55″W	4 m (13 ft)	6.9 (44.4)	1.4 (34.5)	22.2 (72.0)	13.7 (56.7)	13.9 (57.0)	6.8 (44.2)
Victoria, BC	YYJ	48°38′50″N 123°25′33″W	20 m (66 ft)	7.6 (45.7)	1.5 (34.7)	22.4 (72.3)	11.3 (52.3)	14.4 (57.9)	5.6 (42.1)
Whitehorse, YT	YXY	60°42′34″N 135°04′08″W	706 m (2,316 ft)	−11.0 (12.2)	−19.2 (−2.6)	20.6 (69.1)	8.0 (46.4)	5.1 (41.2)	−5.2 (22.6)
Windsor, ON	YQG	42°16′32″N 82°57′20″W	190 m (620 ft)	−0.3 (31.5)	−7.3 (18.9)	28.1 (82.6)	17.9 (64.2)	14.4 (57.9)	5.4 (41.7)
Winnipeg, MB	YWG	49°55′00″N 097°14′00″W	239 m (784 ft)	−11.3 (11.7)	−21.4 (−6.5)	25.9 (78.6)	13.5 (56.3)	8.7 (47.7)	−2.7 (27.1)
Yarmouth, NS	YQI	43°49′51″N 066°05′19″W	43 m (141 ft)	0.8 (33.4)	−6.9 (19.6)	20.9 (69.6)	12.7 (54.9)	11.1 (52.0)	3.2 (37.8)
Yellowknife, NT	YZF	62°27′46″N 114°26′25″W	206 m (676 ft)	−21.6 (−6.9)	−29.5 (−21.1)	21.3 (70.3)	12.6 (54.7)	0.0 (32.0)	−8.6 (16.5)

=== Heat, cold and frost averages ===
Yearly temperature averages for selected locations in Canada
Location	Region	Days >30°	Days >20°	Frosts	Max temp <0°	Days <-10°	Days <-20°	First frost	Last frost	Frost-free
Baker Lake	NU	0.21	13.1	270.5	225.5	206.3	158.2	Aug 30	Jun 25	65 days
Brandon	MB	15.9	109.8	202.3	110.0	108.6	52.6	Sep 14	May 24	112 days
Calgary	AB	5.1	87.2	194.4	59.3	71.3	21.7	Sep 16	May 21	117 days
Charlottetown	PE	0.9	79.3	160.2	72.6	54.6	6.5	Oct 17	May 16	153 days
Churchill	MB	1.1	28.0	247.5	193.7	171.0	117.2	Sep 15	Jun 19	87 days
Corner Brook	NL	0.7	58.5	159.3	79.0	43.0	3.4	Oct 13	May 19	146 days
Dawson Creek	BC	2.6	62.1	243.7	156.9	162.4	104.1	Aug 13	Jun 3	70 days
Edmonton	AB	4.0	88.4	179.7	82.6	75.3	24.6	Sep 22	May 9	135 days
Fort Frances	ON	6.9	100.4	195.4	106.6	90.8	44.2	Sep 17	May 27	108 days
Fort McMurray	AB	5.9	84.2	212.1	115.8	119.5	57.5	Sep 6	May 30	97 days
Fort Nelson	BC	3.3	78.1	214.2	133.6	139.1	79.8	Sep 11	May 16	117 days
Fort Simpson	NT	4.2	73.8	224.3	159.3	157.3	101.1	Sep 1	May 26	97 days
Fredericton	NB	9.0	104.4	172.9	69.1	72.6	20.0	Sep 25	May 17	130 days
Halifax (city)	NS	1.0	78.2	131.0	47.0	29.8	0.8	Oct 31	May 1	182 days
Hamilton	ON	18.5	119.8	129.0	48.6	32.6	2.5	Oct 16	Apr 21	177 days
High Level	AB	2.7	76.5	224.8	136.3	138.9	79.9	Sep 1	Jun 1	91 days
Iqaluit	NU	0.0	2.1	265.8	212.2	182.4	130.6	Sep 3	Jun 20	74 days
Kamloops	BC	32.8	132.0	119.2	34.5	19.9	3.4	Oct 10	Apr 24	169 days
Kuujjuaq	QC	0.3	21.7	244.0	177.1	155.6	104.5	Sep 9	Jun 18	82 days
Labrador City	NL	0.4	33.1	232.8	155.3	144.5	90.6	Sep 14	Jun 9	95 days
Liverpool	NS	3.3	102.7	146.8	42.0	34.6	3.6	Oct 5	May 15	142 days
Medicine Hat	AB	26.5	120.4	174.6	58.4	64.4	22.8	Sep 25	May 13	134 days
Moose Jaw	SK	21.7	115.1	188.7	86.7	87.7	37.7	Sep 17	May 17	121 days
Moncton	NB	6.8	99.1	166.9	70.0	58.9	14.0	Oct 2	May 23	131 days
Montreal	QC	9.3	117.1	147.7	74.0	62.9	14.3	Oct 12	Apr 29	165 days
Moosonee	ON	6.1	66.3	224.9	129.1	125.6	78.4	Aug 25	Jun 26	58 days
Nain	NL	0.5	16.4	230.1	148.1	126.7	62.4	Sep 24	Jun 18	96 days
Nanaimo	BC	6.7	96.9	71.5	2.6	1.8	0.0	Oct 26	Apr 14	194 days
Osoyoos (west)	BC	36.0	142.4	105.5	25.3	10.7	0.3	Oct 9	Apr 22	169 days
Ottawa	ON	13.0	116.4	154.9	77.5	67.9	16.3	Oct 7	Apr 30	157 days
Princeton	BC	24.2	107.6	177.8	50.6	33.6	6.4	Sep 17	May 23	116 Days
Quebec City	QC	5.1	94.1	170.7	94.9	84.8	31.1	Oct 4	May 11	145 days
Regina	SK	16.2	108.1	201.2	103.0	102.3	43.1	Sep 12	May 20	115 days
Saguenay	QC	7.7	86.8	189.7	104.9	99.2	46.6	Sep 23	May 22	123 days
Saint John	NB	0.9	74.3	167.2	60.7	65.7	14.1	Oct 2	May 16	138 days
Saskatoon	SK	13.1	103.1	200.4	108.0	105.6	47.1	Sep 15	May 21	117 days
St. John's	NL	0.1	52.6	166.6	65.9	34.9	0.6	Oct 17	May 30	139 days
Sydney	NS	2.3	74.9	160.8	60.0	43.2	2.7	Oct 17	May 21	149 days
Thompson	MB	3.8	66.9	238.6	152.5	150.0	100.0	Aug 27	Jun 14	74 days
Toronto	ON	11.5	117.2	100.8	45.9	21.9	1.2	Nov 3	Apr 13	203 days
Toronto Airport	ON	15.8	122.3	136.5	52.8	38.9	3.9	Oct 16	Apr 30	168 days
Vancouver	BC	0.3	76.5	40.9	3.4	1.6	0.0	Nov 10	Mar 18	237 days
Victoria	BC	2.1	78.9	46.0	2.0	0.4	0.0	Nov 5	Apr 7	211 days
Windsor	ON	23.5	138.9	116.3	44.3	24.1	1.2	Oct 30	Apr 17	195 days
Winnipeg	MB	13.3	109.7	193.7	113.0	102.2	50.1	Sep 22	May 23	121 days
Whitehorse	YT	0.9	41.5	221.3	118.7	106.4	48.7	Aug 25	Jun 5	80 days
Yarmouth	NS	0.0	56.7	126.1	36.0	21.7	0.1	Oct 21	Apr 27	176 days
Yellowknife	NT	0.4	42.8	224.5	175.2	160.9	105.2	Sep 18	May 25	115 days

== Extremes ==
Climate data for Canada
Month	Jan	Feb	Mar	Apr	May	Jun	Jul	Aug	Sep	Oct	Nov	Dec	Year
Record high °C (°F)	22.2 (72.0)	26.5 (79.7)	31.1 (88.0)	37.2 (99.0)	42.2 (108.0)	49.6 (121.3)	45.0 (113.0)	44.0 (111.2)	40.8 (105.4)	34.4 (94.0)	29.4 (85.0)	25 (77)	49.6 (121.3)
Record low °C (°F)	−61.2 (−78.2)	−63.0 (−81.4)	−59.0 (−74.2)	−48.9 (−56.0)	−35 (−31)	−22.2 (−8.0)	−11.1 (12.0)	−16.7 (1.9)	−31.7 (−25.1)	−42.0 (−43.6)	−54.0 (−65.2)	−57.8 (−72.0)	−63.0 (−81.4)
Source: February minimum, June maximum, October minimum, November maximum

=== Extreme highs ===
Month	Temperature	Date	Location
January	22.2 °C (72.0 °F)	January 26, 1950	Niagara Falls, Ontario
January	22.2 °C (72.0 °F)	January 10, 1962	Pincher Creek, Alberta
February	26.5 °C (79.7 °F)	February 27, 1992	Fort Macleod, Alberta
March	31.1 °C (88.0 °F)	March 29, 1926	Beaver Creek, British Columbia
April	37.2 °C (99.0 °F)	April 27, 1952	Emerson, Manitoba
April	37.2 °C (99.0 °F)	April 21, 1980	Emerson, Manitoba
May	42.2 °C (108.0 °F)	May 30, 1934	Morden, Manitoba
June	49.6 °C (121.3 °F)	June 29, 2021	Lytton, British Columbia
July	45 °C (113 °F)	July 5, 1937	Midale, Saskatchewan
July	45 °C (113 °F)	July 5, 1937	Yellow Grass, Saskatchewan
August	44.0 °C (111.2 °F)	August 3, 1984	Altawan, Alberta
September	40.8 °C (105.4 °F)	September 3, 2025	Ashcroft, British Columbia
October	34.4 °C (93.9 °F)	October 3, 1943	Roadene, Saskatchewan
October	34.4 °C (93.9 °F)	October 5, 1943	Biggar, Saskatchewan
November	29.4 °C (84.9 °F)	November 4, 1916	Jenner, Alberta
December	25 °C (77 °F)	December 8, 1903	Fort Macleod, Alberta
December	25 °C (77 °F)	December 4, 1943	Grand Forks, British Columbia

=== Extreme lows ===
Month	Temperature	Date	Location
January	−61.2 °C (−78.2 °F)	January 11, 1911	Fort Vermilion, Alberta
January	−61.2 °C (−78.2 °F)	January 19, 1952	Snag, Yukon
February	−63.0 °C (−81.4 °F)	February 3, 1947	Snag, Yukon
March	−59.0 °C (−74.2 °F)	March 4, 1876	Floeberg Beach, Nunavut
April	−48.9 °C (−56.0 °F)	April 8, 1964	Eureka, Nunavut
May	−35 °C (−31 °F)	May 13, 1935	Cambridge Bay, Nunavut
June	−22.2 °C (−8.0 °F)	June 1, 1976	Bathurst Island, Nunavut
July	−11.1 °C (12.0 °F)	July 14, 1928	Aklavik, Northwest Territories
August	−16.7 °C (1.9 °F)	August 31, 1915	High River, Alberta
September	−31.7 °C (−25.1 °F)	September 25, 1961	Eureka, Nunavut
October	−42.0 °C (−43.6 °F)	October 29-30, 1984	Ogilvie River, Yukon
November	−54.0 °C (−65.2 °F)	November 28, 1985	Braeburn, Yukon
December	−57.8 °C (−72.0 °F)	December 31, 1933	Fort Vermilion, Alberta
December	−57.8 °C (−72.0 °F)	December 13, 1946	Mayo, Yukon

- Highest recorded June 29, 2021 49.6 °C (121.3 °F) Lytton, British Columbia.
- Lowest recorded February 3, 1947 −63.0 °C (−81.4 °F) Snag, Yukon.

The table can be reordered by clicking on the box in each column. Places in italics are provincial capital, bold is the national capital.

Community	Weather station	Location	Elevation	January (Record high °C (°F))	January (Record low °C (°F))	July (Record high °C (°F))	July (Record low °C (°F))	Annual (Extreme high °C (°F))	Annual (Extreme low °C (°F))
Alberton, PE		46°51′00″N 064°01′00″W	3 m (9.8 ft)	13.2 (55.8)	−31.7 (−25.1)	33.0 (91.4)	3.0 (37.4)	33.3 (91.9)	−33.0 (−27.4)
Alert, NU	YLT	82°30′05″N 62°20′20″W	30.5 m (100 ft)	0.0 (32.0)	−50.0 (−58.0)	20.0 (68.0)	−6.3 (20.7)	20.0 (68.0)	−50.0 (−58.0)
Baker Lake, NU	YBK	64°17′56″N 096°04′40″W	18.6 m (61 ft)	−1.7 (28.9)	−50.6 (−59.1)	33.6 (92.5)	−1.7 (28.9)	33.6 (92.5)	−50.6 (−59.1)
Baie-Comeau, QC	YBC	49°08′00″N 068°12′00″W	22 m (72 ft)	11.4 (52.5)	−47.2 (−53.0)	32.8 (91.0)	0.6 (33.1)	32.8 (91.0)	−47.2 (−53.0)
Calgary, AB	YYC	51°06′50″N 114°01′13″W	1,084 m (3,556 ft)	17.6 (63.7)	−44.4 (−47.9)	36.1 (97.0)	−0.6 (30.9)	36.5 (97.7)	−45.0 (−49.0)
Charlottetown, PE	YYG	46°17′19″N 063°07′43″W	49 m (161 ft)	15.1 (59.2)	−30.5 (−22.9)	33.9 (93.0)	3.3 (37.9)	34.4 (93.9)	−30.5 (−22.9)
Churchill, MB	YYQ	58°44′21″N 094°03′59″W	29 m (95 ft)	1.7 (35.1)	−45.0 (−49.0)	34.0 (93.2)	1.1 (34.0)	36.9 (98.4)	−45.4 (−49.7)
Corner Brook, NL		48°57′00″N 057°57′00″W	5 m (16 ft)	16.5 (61.7)	−31.7 (−25.1)	34.4 (93.9)	1.1 (34.0)	35.0 (95.0)	−31.7 (−25.1)
Dawson City, YT	YDA	64°02′35″N 139°07′40″W	370 m (1,210 ft)	9.7 (49.5)	−53.8 (−64.8)	33.5 (92.3)	−2.0 (28.4)	34.7 (94.5)	−55.8 (−68.4)
Edmonton, AB	YXD	53°34′24″N 113°31′06″W	671 m (2,201 ft)	13.8 (56.8)	−49.4 (−56.9)	36.7 (98.1)	−1.7 (28.9)	37.2 (99.0)	−49.4 (−56.9)
Edmundston, NB		47°20′47″N 068°11′16″W	163 m (535 ft)	13.0 (55.4)	−41.0 (−41.8)	36.0 (96.8)	2.0 (35.6)	36.0 (96.8)	−41.0 (−41.8)
Fort Nelson, BC	YYE	58°50′11″N 122°35′50″W	382 m (1,253 ft)	10.7 (51.3)	−51.7 (−61.1)	36.7 (98.1)	1.1 (34.0)	36.7 (98.1)	−51.7 (−61.1)
Fredericton, NB	YFC	45°52′20″N 066°31′40″W	21 m (69 ft)	14.6 (58.3)	−35.6 (−32.1)	36.7 (98.1)	1.7 (35.1)	37.2 (99.0)	−37.2 (−35.0)
Halifax, NS	YHZ	44°52′48″N 063°30′00″W	145 m (476 ft)	14.8 (58.6)	−28.5 (−19.3)	33.9 (93.0)	6.1 (43.0)	35.0 (95.0)	−28.5 (−19.3)
High Level, AB	YOJ	58°37′17″N 117°09′53″W	338 m (1,109 ft)	11.3 (52.3)	−50.6 (−59.1)	34.4 (93.9)	−0.2 (31.6)	35.2 (95.4)	−50.6 (−59.1)
Inuvik, NT	YEV	68°18′15″N 133°28′58″W	68 m (223 ft)	5.4 (41.7)	−54.4 (−65.9)	32.8 (91.0)	−3.3 (26.1)	32.8 (91.0)	−56.7 (−70.1)
Iqaluit, NU	YFB	63°45′00″N 068°33′00″W	34 m (112 ft)	3.9 (39.0)	−45.0 (−49.0)	26.1 (79.0)	−2.8 (27.0)	26.1 (79.0)	−45.6 (−50.1)
Kugluktuk, NU	YCO	67°49′00″N 115°08′38″W	23 m (75 ft)	0.8 (33.4)	−47.3 (−53.1)	34.9 (94.8)	−0.8 (30.6)	34.9 (94.8)	−47.3 (−53.1)
La Ronge, SK	YVC	55°09′00″N 105°16′00″W	379 m (1,243 ft)	12.5 (54.5)	−48.3 (−54.9)	35.5 (95.9)	1.1 (34.0)	36.1 (97.0)	−48.3 (−54.9)
Mayo, YT	YMA	63°37′00″N 135°52′00″W	504 m (1,654 ft)	10.1 (50.2)	−58.3 (−72.9)	35.6 (96.1)	−2.8 (27.0)	36.1 (97.0)	−62.2 (−80.0)
Moncton, NB	YQM	46°06′19″N 064°41′02″W	71 m (233 ft)	16.1 (61.0)	−32.2 (−26.0)	35.6 (96.1)	1.2 (34.2)	37.2 (99.0)	−32.2 (−26.0)
Montreal, QC	YUL	45°28′00″N 073°45′00″W	36 m (118 ft)	13.9 (57.0)	−37.8 (−36.0)	35.6 (96.1)	6.1 (43.0)	37.6 (99.7)	−37.8 (−36.0)
Nain, NL	YDP	56°33′00″N 061°41′00″W	6 m (20 ft)	10.5 (50.9)	−39.4 (−38.9)	33.3 (91.9)	−2.8 (27.0)	33.3 (91.9)	−41.5 (−42.7)
Norman Wells, NT	YVQ	65°16′57″N 126°48′01″W	73 m (240 ft)	12.4 (54.3)	−52.2 (−62.0)	35.0 (95.0)	−1.1 (30.0)	35.0 (95.0)	−54.4 (−65.9)
Ottawa, ON	YOW	45°19′21″N 075°40′09″W	114 m (374 ft)	12.9 (55.2)	−35.6 (−32.1)	36.7 (98.1)	5.0 (41.0)	37.8 (100.0)	−36.1 (−33.0)
Princeton, BC	CYDC	49°28′05″N 120°30′41″W	700 m (2,300 ft)	13.3 (55.9)	−41.1 (−42.0)	41.7 (107.1)	0.0 (32.0)	41.7 (107.1)	−42.8 (−45.0)
Quebec City, QC	YQB	46°48′00″N 071°23′00″W	74 m (243 ft)	10.0 (50.0)	−35.4 (−31.7)	35.6 (96.1)	3.9 (39.0)	35.6 (96.1)	−36.1 (−33.0)
Regina, SK	YQR	50°26′00″N 104°40′00″W	578 m (1,896 ft)	10.4 (50.7)	−50.0 (−58.0)	43.3 (109.9)	−2.2 (28.0)	43.3 (109.9)	−50.0 (−58.0)
Resolute, NU	YRB	74°43′01″N 094°58′10″W	68 m (223 ft)	−0.8 (30.6)	−52.2 (−62.0)	18.5 (65.3)	−3.1 (26.4)	18.5 (65.3)	−52.2 (−62.0)
Saskatoon, SK	YXE	52°10′00″N 106°43′00″W	504 m (1,654 ft)	10.0 (50.0)	−48.9 (−56.0)	40.6 (105.1)	−3.3 (26.1)	40.6 (105.1)	−50.0 (−58.0)
St. John's, NL	YYT	47°37′20″N 052°44′34″W	141 m (463 ft)	15.7 (60.3)	−23.3 (−9.9)	31.5 (88.7)	−1.1 (30.0)	31.5 (88.7)	−23.8 (−10.8)
Summerside, PE	YSU	46°26′20″N 063°49′54″W	20 m (66 ft)	12.1 (53.8)	−29.9 (−21.8)	33.3 (91.9)	6.7 (44.1)	33.3 (91.9)	−29.9 (−21.8)
Sydney, NS	YQY	46°10′00″N 060°02′53″W	62 m (203 ft)	16.9 (62.4)	−26.2 (−15.2)	33.9 (93.0)	2.2 (36.0)	35.5 (95.9)	−27.3 (−17.1)
Thompson, MB	YTH	55°48′12″N 097°51′45″W	224 m (735 ft)	8.1 (46.6)	−48.9 (−56.0)	35.9 (96.6)	−1.1 (30.0)	37.4 (99.3)	−48.9 (−56.0)
Timmins, ON	YTS	48°34′11″N 081°22′36″W	295 m (968 ft)	7.6 (45.7)	−44.2 (−47.6)	38.9 (102.0)	−0.5 (31.1)	38.9 (102.0)	−45.6 (−50.1)
Toronto, ON	YYZ	43°40′38″N 079°37′50″W	173 m (568 ft)	17.6 (63.7)	−31.3 (−24.3)	37.6 (99.7)	3.9 (39.0)	38.3 (100.9)	−31.3 (−24.3)
Vancouver, BC	YVR	49°11′42″N 123°10′55″W	4 m (13 ft)	15.3 (59.5)	−17.8 (0.0)	34.4 (93.9)	6.7 (44.1)	34.4 (93.9)	−17.8 (0.0)
Victoria, BC	YYJ	48°38′50″N 123°25′33″W	20 m (66 ft)	16.1 (61.0)	−15.6 (3.9)	36.3 (97.3)	4.1 (39.4)	36.3 (97.3)	−15.6 (3.9)
Whitehorse, YT	YXY	60°42′34″N 135°04′08″W	706 m (2,316 ft)	9.0 (48.2)	−52.2 (−62.0)	32.8 (91.0)	−0.5 (31.1)	34.4 (93.9)	−52.2 (−62.0)
Windsor, ON	YQG	42°16′32″N 82°57′20″W	190 m (620 ft)	17.8 (64.0)	−29.1 (−20.4)	38.3 (100.9)	5.6 (42.1)	40.2 (104.4)	−29.1 (−20.4)
Winnipeg, MB	YWG	49°55′00″N 097°14′00″W	239 m (784 ft)	7.8 (46.0)	−42.2 (−44.0)	37.8 (100.0)	1.1 (34.0)	40.6 (105.1)	−45.0 (−49.0)
Yarmouth, NS	YQI	43°49′51″N 066°05′19″W	43 m (141 ft)	14.0 (57.2)	−21.3 (−6.3)	30.0 (86.0)	5.8 (42.4)	30.3 (86.5)	−23.6 (−10.5)
Yellowknife, NT	YZF	62°27′46″N 114°26′25″W	206 m (676 ft)	3.4 (38.1)	−51.2 (−60.2)	32.5 (90.5)	0.6 (33.1)	32.5 (90.5)	−51.2 (−60.2)

== Climate change ==
Among countries that emit high levels of greenhouse gas, Canada is among the highest per person emitters.

Climate change is greatly impacting Canada's environment and landscapes. Extreme weather has become more frequent and severe because of the continued release of greenhouse gases into the atmosphere. The number of climate change–related events, such as the 2021 British Columbia Floods and an increasing number of forest fires, has become an increasing concern over time. Canada's annual average temperature over land warmed by 1.7 °C (3.1 °F) between 1948 and 2016. The rate of warming is highest in Canada's north, the Prairies, and northern British Columbia. The country's precipitation has increased in recent years and wildfires expanded from seasonal events to year-round threats.

== Maps ==
Weather Stations locations in Canada.

Weather Stations

== Notes ==
- Bailey, William G; Oke, T.R.; Rouse, Wayne R (1997). The surface climates of Canada. McGill−Queen's University Press. ISBN 0-7735-1672-7.
- Bernstein, Steven (2008), A globally integrated climate policy for Canada, University of Toronto Press, ISBN 978-0-8020-9878-8
- Coward, Harold G; Weaver, Andrew John (2007), Hard choices: climate change in Canada, Wilfrid Laurier University Press, ISBN 978-0-88920-442-3
- French, Hugh M; Slaymaker, Olav (1993), Canada's Cold Environments, McGill−Queen's University Press, ISBN 0-7735-0925-9
- Jaccard, Mark; Simpson, Jeffrey; Nic, Rivers (2008), Hot Air: Meeting Canada's Climate Change Challenge, Emblem/McClelland & Stewart, ISBN 9780771080975
- Smit, Barry; Wall, Shirley Ellen; Wandel, Johanna (2007), Farming in a changing climate: agricultural adaptation in Canada, UBC Press, ISBN 978-0-7748-1393-8

== See also ==
- List of extreme temperatures in Canada
- Weather extremes in Canada
- List of cities by average temperature
