= Collegeville =

Collegeville may refer to some places in the United States:

- Collegeville, Alabama
- Collegeville, Indiana
- Collegeville Township, Minnesota
- Collegeville, Pennsylvania

Collegeville may refer to some places in Canada:

- Collegeville, Nova Scotia
