= List of extreme temperatures in Canada =

The following is a list of the most extreme temperatures recorded in Canada.

Province or Territory	Record high temperature	Date	Place(s)	Record low temperature	Date	Place(s)
Alberta	44 °C (111.2 °F)	August 3, 1984	Altawan	−61.2 °C (−78.2 °F)	January 11, 1911	Fort Vermilion
British Columbia	49.6 °C (121.3 °F)	June 29, 2021	Lytton	−58.9 °C (−74.0 °F)	January 31, 1947	Smith River
Manitoba	44.4 °C (111.9 °F)	July 11 and 12, 1936	Emerson and St. Albans (Treesbank)	−52.8 °C (−63.0 °F)	January 9, 1899	Norway House
New Brunswick	39.4 °C (102.9 °F)	August 18, 1935	Nepisiguit Falls, Rexton, and Woodstock	−47.2 °C (−53.0 °F)	February 1, 1955	Sisson Dam
Newfoundland and Labrador	41.7 °C (107.1 °F)	August 11, 1914	North West River (Labrador)	−51.2 °C (−60.2 °F)	February 17, 1973	Esker (Labrador)
Northwest Territories	39.9 °C (103.8 °F)	June 30, 2021	Fort Smith	−59.4 °C (−74.9 °F)	January 8, 18, and 21, 1936	Fort Resolution (Note: Recorded by Father Houssais on December 31, 1910, it was called into question as a reading error by him 11 days later)
Nova Scotia	38.3 °C (100.9 °F)	August 19, 1935	Collegeville	−41.1 °C (−42.0 °F)	January 31, 1920	Upper Stewiacke
Nunavut	34.9 °C (94.8 °F)	July 15, 1989	Kugluktuk	−59 °C (−74.2 °F)	March 4, 1876	Floeberg Beach
Ontario	42.8 °C (109.0 °F)	July 31, 1975	Turbine	−58.3 °C (−72.9 °F)	January 23, 1935	Iroquois Falls
Prince Edward Island	36.7 °C (98.1 °F)	August 19, 1935	Charlottetown	−37.2 °C (−35.0 °F)	January 26, 1884	South Kildare
Quebec	40 °C (104.0 °F)	July 6, 1921 & August 1, 1975	Ville-Marie & Saint-Alexis-des-Monts	−54.4 °C (−65.9 °F)	February 5, 1923	Doucet
Saskatchewan	45 °C (113.0 °F)	July 5, 1937	Yellow Grass and Midale	−56.7 °C (−70.1 °F)	February 1, 1893	Prince Albert
Yukon	36.5 °C (97.7 °F)	June 25, 2004	Takhini	−63.0 °C (−81.4 °F)	February 3, 1947	Snag

== Highest temperature readings (selected locations) ==
Date Recorded	Location	Temperature °C (°F)
June 29, 2021	Lytton, British Columbia	49.6 °C (121.3 °F)
June 29, 2021	Spences Bridge, British Columbia	48.6 °C (119.5 °F)
June 29, 2021	Ashcroft, British Columbia	48.1 °C (118.6 °F)
June 29, 2021	Kamloops, British Columbia	47.3 °C (117.1 °F)
June 29, 2021	Lillooet, British Columbia	46.8 °C (116.2 °F)
June 29, 2021	Kelowna, British Columbia	45.7 °C (114.3 °F)
June 29, 2021	Osoyoos, British Columbia	45.0 °C (113.0 °F)
July 5, 1937	Yellow Grass and Midale, Saskatchewan	45.0 °C (113.0 °F)
July 11 and 12, 1936	Emerson and St. Albans (Treesbank), Manitoba	44.4 °C (111.9 °F)
June 28, 2021	Woss, British Columbia	44.1 °C (111.4 °F)
July 5, 1937	Regina, Saskatchewan	43.9 °C (111.0 °F)
June 28, 2021	Gold River, British Columbia	43.7 °C (110.7 °F)
July 11, 1936	Brandon, Manitoba	43.3 °C (109.9 °F)
July 21, 1931	Bassano Dam, Alberta	43.3 °C (109.9 °F)
July 31, 1975	Turbine, Ontario	42.8 °C (109.0 °F)
July 11 and 12, 1936	Atikokan, Ontario	42.2 °C (108.0 °F)
July 13, 1936	Fort Frances, Ontario	42.2 °C (108.0 °F)
July 11, 1936	Winnipeg, Manitoba	42.2 °C (108.0 °F)
July 20, 1919	Biscotasing, Ontario	42.2 °C (108.0 °F)
July 30, 2009	Woss, British Columbia	42.1 °C (107.8 °F)
July 29, 2009	Bella Coola, British Columbia	41.2 °C (106.2 °F)
July 14, 1868	Hamilton, Ontario	41.1 °C (106.0 °F)
July 12, 2026	Armstrong, Ontario	40.8 °C (105.4 °F)
June 27, 2021	West Vancouver, British Columbia	40.6 °C (105.1 °F)
July 8, 9, 10, 1936	Toronto, Ontario	40.6 °C (105.1 °F)
July 4, 1911	Grimsby, Ontario	40.6 °C (105.1 °F)
June 6, 1988	Saskatoon, Saskatchewan	40.6 °C (105.1 °F)
June 28, 2021	Nanaimo, British Columbia	40.5 °C (104.9 °F)
June 25, 1988	Windsor, Ontario	40.3 °C (104.5 °F)
July 6, 1921	Ville-Marie, Quebec	40.0 °C (104.0 °F)
June 30, 2021	Fort Smith, Northwest Territories	39.9 °C (103.8 °F)
June 28, 2021	Victoria, British Columbia	39.8 °C (103.6 °F)
June 27, 2021	Campbell River, British Columbia	39.6 °C (103.3 °F)
August 18, 1935	Nepisiguit Falls, Rexton & Woodstock, New Brunswick	39.4 °C (102.9 °F)
June 18, 1995	Timmins, Ontario	38.8 °C (101.8 °F)
July 9, 2024	Trail, British Columbia	38.4 °C (101.1 °F)
July 31, 1975	Sudbury, Ontario	38.3 °C (100.9 °F)
August 19, 1935	Collegeville, Nova Scotia	38.3 °C (100.9 °F)
August 10, 2001	Ingonish Beach, Nova Scotia	37.7 °C (99.9 °F)
June 19, 2024	Bathurst, New Brunswick	37.6 °C (99.7 °F)
July 10, 1912	Halifax, Nova Scotia	37.2 °C (99.0 °F)
July 30, 1975	Thunder Bay, Ontario	37.2 °C (99.0 °F)
July 15, 1989	Kugluktuk, Nunavut	34.9 °C (94.8 °F)
July 30, 2009	Vancouver, British Columbia	34.4 °C (93.9 °F)
July 20, 2000	Robertson Lake, Nunavut	32.6 °C (90.7 °F)

== Highest temperatures ever recorded in Canada ==
Date Recorded	Location	Temperature
June 29, 2021	Lytton, British Columbia	49.6 °C (121.3 °F)
June 29, 2021	Spences Bridge, British Columbia	48.6 °C (119.5 °F)
June 29, 2021	Ashcroft, British Columbia	48.1 °C (118.6 °F)
June 28, 2021	Lytton, British Columbia	47.9 °C (118.2 °F)
June 29, 2021	Kamloops, British Columbia	47.3 °C (117.1 °F)
June 27, 2021	Lytton, British Columbia	46.6 °C (115.9 °F)
June 29, 2021	Kelowna, British Columbia	45.7 °C (114.3 °F)
July 5, 1937	Yellow Grass, Saskatchewan	45.0 °C (113.0 °F)
July 5, 1937	Midale, Saskatchewan	45.0 °C (113.0 °F)
July 11, 1936	St. Albans (Treesbank), Manitoba	44.4 °C (111.9 °F)
July 12, 1936	Emerson, Manitoba	44.4 °C (111.9 °F)
July 17, 1944	Lillooet, British Columbia	44.4 °C (111.9 °F)
July 17, 1944	Lytton, British Columbia	44.4 °C (111.9 °F)
July 17, 1944	Barriere, British Columbia	44.4 °C (111.9 °F)
July 29, 1934	Rock Creek, British Columbia	43.9 °C (111.0 °F)
June 5, 1988	Kincaid, Saskatchewan	43.5 °C (110.3 °F)

== Lowest temperature readings ==
The coldest place in Canada based on average yearly temperature is Eureka, Nunavut, where the temperature averages at −19.7 °C or −3.5 °F for the year.

Date Recorded	Location	Temperature
Monday, February 3, 1947	Snag, Yukon	−63.0 °C (−81.4 °F)
Monday, February 3, 1947	Mayo, Yukon	−62.2 °C (−80.0 °F)
Saturday, December 31, 1910	Fort Good Hope, Northwest Territories	−61.7 °C (−79.1 °F) (disputed)
Wednesday, January 11, 1911	Fort Vermilion, Alberta	−61.2 °C (−78.2 °F)
Sunday, January 5, 1975	Old Crow, Yukon	−59.4 °C (−74.9 °F)
Wednesday, January 8, Saturday, January 18, and Tuesday, January 21, 1936	Fort Resolution, NWT	−59.4 °C (−74.9 °F)
Friday, January 31, 1947	Smith River, British Columbia	−58.9 °C (−74.0 °F)
Wednesday, January 23, 1935	Iroquois Falls, Ontario	−58.3 °C (−72.9 °F)
Monday, February 3, 1947	Dawson City, Yukon	−58.3 °C (−72.9 °F)
Tuesday, February 13, 1973	Shephard Bay, Nunavut	−57.8 °C (−72.0 °F)
Wednesday, December 26, 1917	Fort Smith, Northwest Territories	−57.2 °C (−71.0 °F)
Wednesday, January 21, 1906	Whitehorse, Yukon	−56.2 °C (−69.2 °F)
Saturday, February 1, 1947	Fort Simpson, Northwest Territories	−56.1 °C (−69.0 °F)
Friday, February 9, 1934	Iroquois Falls, Ontario	−55.6 °C (−68.1 °F)
Thursday, February 15, 1979	Eureka, Nunavut	−55.3 °C (−67.5 °F)
Monday, February 12, 1979	Pond Inlet, Nunavut	−53.9 °C (−65.0 °F)
Monday, February 5, 1923	Doucet, Quebec	−54.4 °C (−65.9 °F)
Monday, January 9, 1899	Norway House, Manitoba	−52.8 °C (−63.0 °F)
Friday, January 7, 1966	Resolute, Nunavut	−52.2 °C (−62.0 °F)
Thursday, December 22, 2022	Rabbit Kettle, Northwest Territories	−52.1 °C (−61.8 °F)
Friday, January 31, 1947	Yellowknife, Northwest Territories	−51.2 °C (−60.2 °F)
Saturday, February 17, 1973	Esker 2, Newfoundland and Labrador	−51.1 °C (−60.0 °F)
Thursday, January 13, 1972	High Level, Alberta	−50.6 °C (−59.1 °F)
Wednesday, January 31, 1996	Geraldton, Ontario	−50.2 °C (−58.4 °F)
Thursday January 1, 1885	Regina, Saskatchewan	−50.0 °C (−58.0 °F)
Thursday, January 11, 2018	Rabbit Kettle, Northwest Territories	−49.8 °C (−57.6 °F)
Tuesday, January 19 and Thursday, January 21, 1886	Edmonton, Alberta	−49.4 °C (−56.9 °F)
Saturday, December 30, 2017	Rabbit Kettle, Northwest Territories	−48.6 °C (−55.5 °F)
Saturday, February 17, 1973	Wabush, Newfoundland and Labrador	−47.8 °C (−54.0 °F)
Wednesday, December 24, 1879	Winnipeg, Manitoba	−47.8 °C (−54.0 °F)
Friday, February 10, 1967	Iqaluit, Nunavut	−45.6 °C (−50.1 °F)
Monday, January 29, 1996	Jasper, Alberta	−43.8 °C (−46.8 °F)
Tuesday, December 17, 2013	Eureka Airport, Nunavut	−42.0 °C (−43.6 °F)
Saturday, January 31, 1920	Upper Stewiacke, Nova Scotia	−41.1 °C (−42.0 °F)
Thursday, December 17, 2020	Fort McKay, Alberta	−37.1 °C (−34.8 °F)

== Yearly Canadian temperature extremes ==
- Note that minimum extremes are for the entire winter season ending in the year listed.

Year	Extreme maximum		Extreme minimum	
Year	Location	Temperature	Location	Temperature
2026	Lytton, British Columbia	41.2 °C (106 °F)	Thomsen River, NWT	−52.4 °C (−62 °F)
2025	Lytton, British Columbia	41.3 °C (106 °F)	Braeburn, Yukon	−55.7 °C (−68 °F)
2024	Lytton, British Columbia	42.5 °C (109 °F)	Keg River, Alberta and Old Crow, Yukon	−51.5 °C (−61 °F)
2023	Lytton, British Columbia	42.2 °C (108 °F)	Rabbit Kettle, Northwest Territories	−53.4 °C (−64 °F)
2022	Lytton, British Columbia	42.2 °C (108 °F)	Pelly Farm, Yukon	−53.5 °C (−64 °F)
2021	Lytton, British Columbia	49.6 °C (121 °F)	Wekweeti, Northwest Territories (NWT)	−52.0 °C (−62 °F)
2020	Lytton, British Columbia	41.4 °C (107 °F)	Thomsen River, NWT	−51.8 °C (−61 °F)
2019	Trail, British Columbia	39.2 °C (103 °F)	Shepherd Bay, Nunavut	−48.8 °C (−56 °F)
2018	Moose Jaw, Saskatchewan	42.3 °C (108 °F)	Kugaaruk, Nunavut	−51.8 °C (−61 °F)
2017	Hedley, British Columbia	41.0 °C (106 °F)	Mould Bay, Northwest Territories	−54.7 °C (−66 °F)
2016	Oliver, British Columbia	39.0 °C (102 °F)	Eureka, Nunavut	−47.8 °C (−54 °F)
2015	Hedley, British Columbia	42.0 °C (108 °F)	Old Crow, Yukon	−49.7 °C (−57 °F)
2014	Ashcroft, British Columbia	41.7 °C (107 °F)	Eureka, Nunavut	−50.4 °C (−59 °F)
2013	Lytton, British Columbia	40.5 °C (105 °F)	Eureka, Nunavut	−51.5 °C (−61 °F)
2012	Lytton, British Columbia	40.3 °C (105 °F)	Old Crow, Yukon	−52.1 °C (−62 °F)
2011	Grimsby, Ontario	38.5 °C (101 °F)	Watson Lake, Yukon	−52.8 °C (−63 °F)
2010	Ashcroft, British Columbia	38.8 °C (102 °F)	Old Crow, Yukon	−47.6 °C (−54 °F)
2009	Gold River, British Columbia	41.5 °C (107 °F)	McQuesten, Yukon	−52.0 °C (−62 °F)
2008	Lytton, British Columbia	40.4 °C (105 °F)	Mayo, Yukon	−53.8 °C (−65 °F)
2007	Woodrow, Saskatchewan	43.0 °C (109 °F)	Ogilvie River, Yukon	−54.5 °C (−66 °F)
2006	Lytton, British Columbia	42.1 °C (108 °F)	Fort Good Hope, Northwest Territories	−50.0 °C (−58 °F)
2005	Frontier, Saskatchewan	39.5 °C (103 °F)	Stewart Crossing and Burwash Landing, Yukon	−55.0 °C (−67 °F)
2004	Lytton, British Columbia	41.8 °C (107 °F)	Pelly Ranch and Ogilvie River, Yukon	−54.5 °C (−66 °F)
2003	Elrose, Saskatchewan	41.0 °C (106 °F)	La Grande 4, Quebec	−50.4 °C (−59 °F)
2002	Osoyoos, British Columbia	42.0 °C (108 °F)	Key Lake, Saskatchewan	−51.5 °C (−61 °F)
2001	Osoyoos, British Columbia	41.7 °C (107 °F)	Eureka, Nunavut	−51.2 °C (−60 °F)
2000	Osoyoos, British Columbia	38.8 °C (102 °F)	Nahanni National Park Reserve, Northwest Territories	−52.3 °C (−62 °F)
1999	Spences Bridge, British Columbia	39.0 °C (102 °F)	Ross River, Yukon	−57.0 °C (−71 °F)
1998	Osoyoos, British Columbia	42.8 °C (109 °F)	Stewart Crossing, Yukon	−55.0 °C (−67 °F)
1997	Osoyoos, British Columbia	39.6 °C (103 °F)	Pelly Ranch, Yukon	−55.0 °C (−67 °F)
1996	Osoyoos, British Columbia	41.2 °C (106 °F)	Pelly Ranch, Yukon	−55.0 °C (−67 °F)
1995	Smoky Falls, Ontario and Lake Cowichan, British Columbia	40.0 °C (104 °F)	Sachs Harbour, Northwest Territories	−54.6 °C (−66 °F)
1994	Osoyoos, British Columbia	42.6 °C (109 °F)	Fort Good Hope, Northwest Territories	−52.0 °C (−62 °F)
1993	Spences Bridge, British Columbia	37.5 °C (100 °F)	Old Crow, Yukon	−57.0 °C (−71 °F)
1992	Osoyoos, British Columbia	39.8 °C (104 °F)	Shepherd Bay, Nunavut	−50.0 °C (−58 °F)
1991	Empress and Bindloss, Alberta	40.0 °C (104 °F)	Pelly Ranch, Yukon	−54.0 °C (−65 °F)
1990	Lytton, British Columbia	40.2 °C (104 °F)	Pelly Ranch, Yukon	−57.0 °C (−71 °F)
1989	Turtle Mountain, Manitoba	40.5 °C (105 °F)	Ogilvie River, Yukon	−56.0 °C (−69 °F)
1988	Kincaid, Saskatchewan	43.5 °C (110 °F)	Shepherd Bay, Nunavut	−55.6 °C (−68 °F)
1987	Boston Bar, British Columbia	42.0 °C (108 °F)	Eureka, Nunavut	−55.3 °C (−68 °F)
1986	Boston Bar, British Columbia	41.5 °C (107 °F)	Swift River, Yukon	−54.0 °C (−65 °F)
1985	Lytton, British Columbia	41.0 °C (106 °F)	Braeburn, Yukon	−54.0 °C (−65 °F)
1984	Altawan, Alberta	44.0 °C (111 °F)	Pelly Ranch, Yukon	−55.0 °C (−67 °F)
1983	Midale, Saskatchewan	41.5 °C (107 °F)	Stewart River, Yukon	−58.0 °C (−72 °F)
1982	Boston Bar and Spences Bridge, British Columbia	39.5 °C (103 °F)	Ross River, Yukon	−58.5 °C (−73 °F)
1981	Boston Bar and Lytton, British Columbia	41.5 °C (107 °F)	Stewart Crossing, Yukon	−55.5 °C (−68 °F)
1980	Francis, Saskatchewan	40.0 °C (104 °F)	Pelly Ranch, Yukon	−58.0 °C (−72 °F)
1979	Kettle Valley, British Columbia	41.5 °C (107 °F)	Pelly Ranch, Yukon	−58.5 °C (−73 °F)
1978	Boston Bar, British Columbia	41.5 °C (107 °F)	Pelly Ranch, Yukon	−54.4 °C (−66 °F)
1977	Salmo, British Columbia	41.5 °C (107 °F)	Eagle River, Yukon	−53.9 °C (−65 °F)
1976	Waskada, Manitoba	39.4 °C (103 °F)	Ross River, Yukon	−56.7 °C (−70 °F)
1975	Turbine, Ontario	42.8 °C (109 °F)	Old Crow and Ross River, Yukon	−59.4 °C (−75 °F)
1974	Kamloops, British Columbia	41.1 °C (106 °F)	Mayo, Yukon	−56.7 °C (−70 °F)
1973	Altawan, Alberta	40.0 °C (104 °F)	Shepherd Bay, Nunavut	−57.8 °C (−72 °F)
1972	Lillooet, British Columbia and Lumsden, Saskatchewan	40.0 °C (104 °F)	Ross River, Yukon	−56.7 °C (−70 °F)
1971	Lytton, British Columbia	42.2 °C (108 °F)	Pelly Ranch and Mayo, Yukon	−58.3 °C (−73 °F)
1970	Altawan, Alberta	41.1 °C (106 °F)	Pelly Ranch, Yukon	−53.9 °C (−65 °F)
1969	Willow Creek, Saskatchewan	41.7 °C (107 °F)	Ross River, Yukon	−57.2 °C (−71 °F)
1968	Boston Bar, British Columbia	40.0 °C (104 °F)	Pelly Ranch, Yukon	−60.0 °C (−76 °F)
1967	Lytton, British Columbia	41.1 °C (106 °F)	Pelly Ranch, Yukon	−56.7 °C (−70 °F)
1966	Yellow Grass, Saskatchewan	39.4 °C (103 °F)	Pelly Ranch and Carmacks, Yukon	−57.8 °C (−72 °F)
1965	Ashcroft, British Columbia	41.7 °C (107 °F)	Snag, Yukon	−56.2 °C (−69 °F)
1964	Sturgeon Crossing, Saskatchewan	41.7 °C (107 °F)	Isachsen, Nunavut	−53.3 °C (−64 °F)
1963	East Poplar River, Willow Creek, and Cardross, Saskatchewan	39.4 °C (103 °F)	Mayo, Yukon	−57.2 °C (−71 °F)
1962	Lytton, British Columbia	38.9 °C (102 °F)	Pelly Ranch, Yukon	−58.9 °C (−74 °F)
1961	Maple Creek, Saskatchewan	43.3 °C (110 °F)	Pelly Ranch and Dawson City, Yukon	−51.2 °C (−60 °F)
1960	Newgate, British Columbia	43.3 °C (110 °F)	Shingle Point, Yukon, Eureka, Nunavut, and Fort McPherson, Northwest Territories	−51.2 °C (−60 °F)
1959	Newgate, British Columbia	41.1 °C (106 °F)	Pelly Ranch, Yukon	−57.8 °C (−72 °F)
1958	Midale, Saskatchewan	41.7 °C (107 °F)	Lake Hazen, Nunavut	−56.2 °C (−69 °F)
1957	Saskatoon, Saskatchewan	38.9 °C (102 °F)	Pelly Ranch, Yukon	−54.4 °C (−66 °F)
1956	Barriere & Lytton, British Columbia	41.1 °C (106 °F)	Pelly Ranch, Yukon	−55.6 °C (−68 °F)
1955	Ramsey, Ontario & Oliver, British Columbia	39.4 °C (103 °F)	Old Crow, Yukon	−55.6 °C (−68 °F)
1954	Foremost, Alberta	40 °C (104 °F)	Frenchman Butte, Saskatchewan & Snag, Yukon	−52.2 °C (−62 °F)
1953	Willow Creek, Saskatchewan	42.2 °C (108 °F)	Elmworth, Alberta	−53.3 °C (−64 °F)
1952	Midale, Saskatchewan	40.6 °C (105 °F)	Snag, Yukon	−61.2 °C (−78 °F)
1951	St Albans, Manitoba & Port Alberni, British Columbia	40.6 °C (105 °F)	Fort Good Hope, Northwest Territories & Isachsen, Nunavut	−52.8 °C (−63 °F)
1950	Lytton & Port Alberni, British Columbia	38.3 °C (101 °F)	Snag, Yukon	−56.2 °C (−69 °F)
1949	Rosetown, Saskatchewan	43.3 °C (110 °F)	Snag, Yukon	−56.2 °C (−69 °F)
1948	Pennant, Saskatchewan	41.7 °C (107 °F)	Eureka, Nunavut	−52.8 °C (−63 °F)
1947	Semans, Saskatchewan	40.0 °C (104 °F)	Snag, Yukon	−63 °C (−81 °F)
1946	Beechy, Saskatchewan	42.8 °C (109 °F)	Mayo, Yukon	−57.8 °C (−72 °F)
1945	Waneta, British Columbia & Fort Qu'Appelle, Saskatchewan	41.1 °C (106 °F)	St. Walburg, Saskatchewan	−50 °C (−58 °F)
1944	Skagit River, British Columbia & Kimberley, British Columbia	42.2 °C (108 °F)	Passe Dangereuse Dam, Quebec	−50 °C (−58 °F)
1943	Rosetown, Saskatchewan	40.0 °C (104 °F)	Mayo, Yukon	−55 °C (−67 °F)
1942	Cumberland, British Columbia	43.9 °C (111 °F)	Heaslip, Ontario	−50 °C (−58 °F)
1941	Lytton, British Columbia, Lillooet, British Columbia& Barriere, British Columbia	44.4 °C (112 °F)	Watson Lake, Yukon	−51.7 °C (−61 °F)
1940	Grand Forks, British Columbia	42.2 °C (108 °F)	Watson Lake, Yukon	−50.6 °C (−59 °F)
1939	Oliver, British Columbia	43.3 °C (110 °F)	Elmworth, Alberta & Watson Lake, Yukon	−52.2 °C (−62 °F)
1938	Barriere, British Columbia	42.8 °C (109 °F)	Fort Good Hope, Northwest Territories	−52.2 °C (−62 °F)
1937	Yellow Grass, Saskatchewan & Midale, Saskatchewan	45.0 °C (113 °F)	Fort Good Hope, Northwest Territories	−51.2 °C (−60 °F)
1936	St Albans (Treesbank), Manitoba & Emerson, Manitoba	44.4 °C (112 °F)	Fort Resolution, Northwest Territories	−59.4 °C (−75 °F)
1935	Lillooet, British Columbia	41.1 °C (106 °F)	Iroquois Falls, Ontario	−58.3 °C (−73 °F)
1934	Rock Creek, British Columbia	43.9 °C (111 °F)	Fort Vermilion, Alberta	−57.8 °C (−72 °F)
1933	Leader, Saskatchewan, Outlook, Saskatchewan, Shaunavon, Saskatchewan, Pennant, Saskatchewan, and Lumsden, Saskatchewan	41.1 °C (106 °F)	Fort Vermilion, Alberta	−57.8 °C (−72 °F)
1932	Fort Qu'Appelle, Saskatchewan	41.1 °C (106 °F)	Mayo, Yukon	−53.9 °C (−65 °F)
1931	Fort Qu'Appelle, Saskatchewan and Aneroid, Saskatchewan	43.3 °C (110 °F)	Fort Good Hope, Northwest Territories	−49.4 °C (−57 °F)
1930	Fort Qu'Appelle, Saskatchewan	41.1 °C (106 °F)	Witchekan, Saskatchewan	−53.9 °C (−65 °F)
1929	Fort Qu'Appelle, Saskatchewan, and Greenwood, British Columbia	42.2 °C (108 °F)	Rocky Mountain House, Alberta	−53.3 °C (−64 °F)
1928	Lillooet, British Columbia and Greenwood, British Columbia	41.7 °C (107 °F)	Vanderhoof, British Columbia & Fort Vermilion, Alberta	−50.6 °C (−59 °F)
1927	Greenwood, British Columbia	43.3 °C (110 °F)	Fort Good Hope, Northwest Territories	−51.7 °C (−61 °F)
1926	Fort Qu'Appelle, Saskatchewan	43.3 °C (110 °F)	Doucet, Quebec	−48.9 °C (−56 °F)
1925	Fort Qu'Appelle, Saskatchewan	41.1 °C (106 °F)	Mayo, Yukon	−57.2 °C (−71 °F)
1924	Waneta, British Columbia and Grand Forks, British Columbia	42.8 °C (109 °F)	Springdale, Alberta and Mayo, Yukon	−54.4 °C (−66 °F)
1923	Newgate, British Columbia and Grand Forks, British Columbia	38.9 °C (102 °F)	Doucet, Quebec	−54.4 °C (−66 °F)
1922	St Albans, Manitoba and Grand Forks, British Columbia	40.0 °C (104 °F)	Fort Resolution, Northwest Territories	−52.8 °C (−63 °F)
1921	St Albans, Manitoba, Bassano Dam, Alberta, and Vauxhall, Alberta	40.6 °C (105 °F)	Fort Good Hope, Northwest Territories	−50.6 °C (−59 °F)
1920	Fort Qu'Appelle, Saskatchewan	41.1 °C (106 °F)	Stry, Alberta	−52.2 °C (−62 °F)
1919	Dauphin, Manitoba	43.3 °C (110 °F)	Fort Vermilion, Alberta	−53.9 °C (−65 °F)
1918	Lillooet, British Columbia, London, Ontario, and Chatham, Ontario	41.1 °C (106 °F)	Fort Smith, Northwest Territories	−53.3 °C (−64 °F)
1917	Jenner, Alberta	42.2 °C (108 °F)	Fort Vermilion, Alberta and Fort Smith, Northwest Territories	−57.2 °C (−71 °F)
1916	Iroquois Falls, Ontario	41.1 °C (106 °F)	Fort Good Hope, Northwest Territories	−55.6 °C (−68 °F)
1915	Jenner, Alberta	40.0 °C (104 °F)	Fort Smith, Northwest Territories	−49.4 °C (−57 °F)
1914	St Albans, Manitoba and North West River, Newfoundland and Labrador	41.7 °C (107 °F)	Amos, Quebec	−52.8 °C (−63 °F)
1913	Ashcroft, British Columbia and Fort Frances, Ontario	38.9 °C (102 °F)	Fort Vermilion, Alberta	−54.4 °C (−66 °F)
1912	St Albans, Manitoba	40.0 °C (104 °F)	Dawson, Yukon	−52.2 °C (−62 °F)
1911	Scarborough, Ontario and Grimsby, Ontario	40.6 °C (105 °F)	Fort Vermilion, Alberta	−61.2 °C (−78 °F)
1910	St Albans, Manitoba and Moosehorn, Manitoba	41.7 °C (107 °F)	Fort Good Hope, Northwest Territories	−55.6 °C (−68 °F)
1909	Cannington, Saskatchewan	40.0 °C (104 °F)	Dawson, Yukon	−53.9 °C (−65 °F)
1908	Spences Bridge, British Columbia	42.2 °C (108 °F)	Fort Chipewyan, Alberta and Fort McPherson, Northwest Territories	−48.9 °C (−56 °F)
1907	Kitimat, British Columbia	41.1 °C (106 °F)	Dawson, Yukon	−50.6 °C (−59 °F)
1906	Spences Bridge, British Columbia	42.2 °C (108 °F)	Whitehorse, Yukon	−56.2 °C (−69 °F)
1905	Spences Bridge, British Columbia	40.6 °C (105 °F)	Gleichen, Alberta and Kneehill, Alberta	−47.2 °C (−53 °F)
1904	Enderby, British Columbia	39.4 °C (103 °F)	Dawson, Yukon	−50 °C (−58 °F)
1903	Spences Bridge, British Columbia	38.9 °C (102 °F)	Dawson, Yukon	−51.7 °C (−61 °F)
1902	Spences Bridge, British Columbia	38.3 °C (101 °F)	Fort Simpson, Northwest Territories	−46.7 °C (−52 °F)
1901	St Albans, Manitoba	38.9 °C (102 °F)	Dawson, Yukon	−55.6 °C (−68 °F)
1900	Cannington, Saskatchewan	43.3 °C (110 °F)	Fort McPherson, Northwest Territories	−51.7 °C (−61 °F)
1899			Iroquois Falls, Ontario	−55.6 °C (−68 °F)
1893			Prince Albert, Saskatchewan	−56.7 °C (−70 °F)
1886	Medicine Hat, Alberta	42.2 °C (108 °F)	Prince Albert, Saskatchewan	−55 °C (−67 °F)
1885			Prince Albert, Saskatchewan	−51.2 °C (−60 °F)
1876			Floeberg Beach, Nunavut	−59 °C (−74 °F)
1849			Fort Confidence, Northwest Territories	−57.8 °C (−72 °F)

=== Occurrences by province ===
Province/Territory	Extreme maximum occurrences	Extreme minimum occurrences
Alberta	8	14
British Columbia	70	1
Manitoba	13	0
Northwest Territories	0	22
Nunavut	0	13
Ontario	8	1
Quebec	0	6
Saskatchewan	32	4
Yukon	0	66

=== Extreme maximum occurrences by community ===
City	Province	Occurrences
Lytton	BC	20
Spences Bridge	BC	8
Osoyoos	BC	8
Fort Qu'Appelle	SK	8
St Albans	MB	8
Boston Bar	BC	6
Lillooet	BC	5
Midale	SK	4
Ashcroft	BC	4

=== Extreme minimum occurrences by town ===
City	Province/Territory	Occurrences
Pelly Ranch	YT	20
Fort Good Hope	NT	10
Dawson	YT	8
Mayo	YT	8
Eureka	NU	7
Fort Vermilion	AB	7
Old Crow	YT	7
Ross River	YT	6
Snag	YT	6
Watson Lake	YT	5
Shepherd Bay	NU	4

== Yearly Canadian average mean temperatures ==
Year	Highest Average		Lowest Average	
Year	Location	Temperature	Location	Temperature
2025				
2024	Windsor, Ontario	12.75 °C (55 °F)	Eureka, Nunavut	−15.2 °C (5 °F)
2023	Qualicum Beach, British Columbia (Sisters Island)	12.3 °C (54 °F)	Eureka, Nunavut	−17.1 °C (1 °F)
2022	Qualicum Beach, British Columbia (Sisters Island)	11.7 °C (53 °F)	Eureka, Nunavut	−17.9 °C (0 °F)
2021	Windsor, Ontario	12.1 °C (54 °F)	Eureka, Nunavut	−15.6 °C (4 °F)
2020	Tsawwassen, British Columbia	12.0 °C (54 °F)	Eureka, Nunavut	−16.9 °C (2 °F)
2019	Vancouver, British Columbia (Harbour CS station)	11.5 °C (53 °F)	Eureka, Nunavut	−16.0 °C (3 °F)
2018	Halfmoon Bay, British Columbia (Merry Island Lighthouse)	11.8 °C (53 °F)	Eureka, Nunavut	−18.8 °C (−2 °F)
2017	Windsor, Ontario	11.5 °C (53 °F)	Eureka, Nunavut	−18.7 °C (−2 °F)
2016	Halfmoon Bay, British Columbia (Merry Island Lighthouse)	12.2 °C (54 °F)	Eureka, Nunavut	−16.7 °C (2 °F)
2015	Howe Sound, British Columbia	12.7 °C (55 °F)	Eureka, Nunavut	−18.1 °C (−1 °F)
2014	Qualicum Beach, British Columbia (Sisters Island)	11.9 °C (53 °F)	Resolute, Nunavut	−15.7 °C (4 °F)
2013	Qualicum Beach, British Columbia	11.3 °C (52 °F)	Resolute, Nunavut	−15.6 °C (4 °F)
2012	Windsor, Ontario	12.2 °C (54 °F)	Eureka, Nunavut	−17.5 °C (0 °F)
2011	Windsor, Ontario	10.8 °C (51 °F)	Eureka, Nunavut	−17.3 °C (1 °F)
2010	Windsor, Ontario	11.4 °C (53 °F)	Eureka, Nunavut	−15.9 °C (3 °F)
2009	Chemainus, British Columbia	10.8 °C (51 °F)	Eureka, Nunavut	−17.7 °C (0 °F)
2008	Halfmoon Bay, British Columbia (Merry Island Lighthouse)	10.7 °C (51 °F)	Eureka, Nunavut	−18.1 °C (−1 °F)
2007	Saturna Island, British Columbia	11.8 °C (53 °F)	Eureka, Nunavut	−16.7 °C (2 °F)
2006	Halfmoon Bay, British Columbia	11.5 °C (53 °F)	Eureka, Nunavut	−16.7 °C (2 °F)
2005	Saturna Island, British Columbia	12.5 °C (55 °F)	Isachsen, Nunavut	−17.5 °C (0 °F)
2004	Vancouver, British Columbia	11.9 °C (53 °F)	Alert, Nunavut	−19.4 °C (−3 °F)
2003	Victoria, British Columbia	11.8 °C (53 °F)	Eureka, Nunavut	−17.6 °C (0 °F)
2002	Windsor, Ontario	11.13 °C (52 °F)	Eureka, Nunavut	−17.6 °C (0 °F)
2001	Saturna Island, British Columbia	11.9 °C (53 °F)	Eureka, Nunavut	−18.7 °C (−2 °F)
2000	Victoria, British Columbia	11.2 °C (52 °F)	Eureka, Nunavut	−19.0 °C (−2 °F)
1999	Windsor, Ontario	11.3 °C (52 °F)	Eureka, Nunavut	−19.7 °C (−3 °F)
1998	Windsor, Ontario	12.5 °C (55 °F)	Eureka, Nunavut	−17.0 °C (1 °F)
1997	Victoria, British Columbia	11.8 °C (53 °F)	Eureka, Nunavut	−19.2 °C (−3 °F)
1996	Vancouver, British Columbia	10.9 °C (52 °F)	Eureka, Nunavut	−18.7 °C (−2 °F)
1995	Vancouver, British Columbia	12.1 °C (54 °F)	Eureka, Nunavut	−18.2 °C (−1 °F)
1994	Vancouver, British Columbia	12.1 °C (54 °F)	Eureka, Nunavut	−18.0 °C (0 °F)
1993	Vancouver, British Columbia	11.5 °C (53 °F)	Eureka, Nunavut	−18.8 °C (−2 °F)
1992	Vancouver, British Columbia	12.4 °C (54 °F)	Eureka, Nunavut	−20.5 °C (−5 °F)
1991	Agassiz, British Columbia	11.3 °C (52 °F)	Mould Bay, Northwest Territories	−17.7 °C (0 °F)
1990	Pelee Island, Ontario	11.1 °C (52 °F)	Eureka, Nunavut	−19.4 °C (−3 °F)
1989	Chilliwack, British Columbia	11.0 °C (52 °F)	Eureka, Nunavut	−20.6 °C (−5 °F)
1988	Chilliwack, British Columbia	10.9 °C (52 °F)	Eureka, Nunavut	−18.3 °C (−1 °F)
1987	Chilliwack, British Columbia	11.9 °C (53 °F)	Eureka, Nunavut	−21.2 °C (−6 °F)
1986	Chilliwack, British Columbia	11.2 °C (52 °F)	Eureka, Nunavut	−20.8 °C (−5 °F)
1985	Windsor, Ontario	10.4 °C (51 °F)	Eureka, Nunavut	−20.0 °C (−4 °F)
1984	Halfmoon Bay, British Columbia	10.4 °C (51 °F)	Eureka, Nunavut	−21.3 °C (−6 °F)
1983	Halfmoon Bay, British Columbia	11.0 °C (52 °F)	Eureka, Nunavut	−19.3 °C (−3 °F)
1982	Halfmoon Bay, British Columbia	10.5 °C (51 °F)	Eureka, Nunavut	−20.4 °C (−5 °F)
1981	Powell River, British Columbia	11.0 °C (52 °F)	Eureka, Nunavut	−17.6 °C (0 °F)
1980	Halfmoon Bay, British Columbia	10.6 °C (51 °F)	Eureka, Nunavut	−19.9 °C (−4 °F)
1979	Port Coquitlam, British Columbia	11.0 °C (52 °F)	Eureka, Nunavut	−21.5 °C (−7 °F)
1978	Port Coquitlam, British Columbia	10.7 °C (51 °F)	Eureka, Nunavut	−19.3 °C (−3 °F)
1977	Vancouver, British Columbia	10.4 °C (51 °F)	Eureka, Nunavut	−19.8 °C (−4 °F)
1976	Chilliwack, British Columbia	10.3 °C (51 °F)	Eureka, Nunavut	−20.6 °C (−5 °F)
1975	Pelee Island, Ontario	10.3 °C (51 °F)	Eureka, Nunavut	−20.5 °C (−5 °F)
1974	Vancouver, British Columbia	10.7 °C (51 °F)	Eureka, Nunavut	−21.3 °C (−6 °F)
1973	Pelee Island, Ontario	11.5 °C (53 °F)	Eureka, Nunavut	−20.0 °C (−4 °F)
1972	Surrey, British Columbia	10.2 °C (50 °F)	Eureka, Nunavut	−21.8 °C (−7 °F)
1971	Windsor, Ontario	10.3 °C (51 °F)	Eureka, Nunavut	−20.0 °C (−4 °F)
1970	Surrey, British Columbia	10.6 °C (51 °F)	Eureka, Nunavut	−20.2 °C (−4 °F)
1969	Halfmoon Bay, British Columbia	10.6 °C (51 °F)	Eureka, Nunavut	−19.5 °C (−3 °F)
1968	Halfmoon Bay, British Columbia	10.6 °C (51 °F)	Eureka, Nunavut	−19.8 °C (−4 °F)
1967	Lytton, British Columbia	11.6 °C (53 °F)	Eureka, Nunavut	−19.5 °C (−3 °F)
1966	Halfmoon Bay, British Columbia	10.8 °C (51 °F)	Eureka, Nunavut	−20.2 °C (−4 °F)
1965	Chilliwack, British Columbia	10.9 °C (52 °F)	Isachsen, Nunavut	−18.8 °C (−2 °F)
1964	Saltspring Island, British Columbia	10.1 °C (50 °F)	Isachsen, Nunavut	−20.5 °C (−5 °F)
1963	Halfmoon Bay, British Columbia	11.2 °C (52 °F)	Eureka, Nunavut	−19.3 °C (−3 °F)
1962	Halfmoon Bay, British Columbia	10.7 °C (51 °F)	Eureka, Nunavut	−18.3 °C (−1 °F)
1961	Chilliwack, British Columbia	11.3 °C (52 °F)	Eureka, Nunavut	−20.4 °C (−5 °F)
1960	Victoria, British Columbia	10.8 °C (51 °F)	Isachsen, Nunavut	−18.3 °C (−1 °F)
1959	Victoria, British Columbia	10.6 °C (51 °F)	Eureka, Nunavut	−19.6 °C (−3 °F)
1958	Victoria, British Columbia	12.1 °C (54 °F)	Eureka, Nunavut	−18.0 °C (0 °F)
1957	Nanaimo, British Columbia	11.0 °C (52 °F)	Eureka, Nunavut	−19.9 °C (−4 °F)
1956	Duncan, British Columbia	10.6 °C (51 °F)	Eureka, Nunavut	−20.2 °C (−4 °F)
1955	Chatham, Ontario	10.8 °C (51 °F)	Eureka, Nunavut	−19.3 °C (−3 °F)
1954	Chatham, Ontario	10.2 °C (50 °F)	Eureka, Nunavut	−18.6 °C (−1 °F)
1953	Lytton, British Columbia	11.2 °C (52 °F)	Eureka, Nunavut	−19.4 °C (−3 °F)
1952	Chatham, Ontario	10.6 °C (51 °F)	Eureka, Nunavut	−18.4 °C (−1 °F)
1951	Nanaimo, British Columbia	11.1 °C (52 °F)	Eureka, Nunavut	−19.4 °C (−3 °F)
1950	Nanaimo, British Columbia	10.2 °C (50 °F)	Isachsen, Nunavut	−19.8 °C (−4 °F)
1949	Chatham, Ontario	11.2 °C (52 °F)	Eureka, Nunavut	−19.6 °C (−3 °F)
1948	Nanaimo, British Columbia	10.4 °C (51 °F)	Eureka, Nunavut	−19.9 °C (−4 °F)

=== Occurrences by province ===
Province/Territory	Extreme warmest year occurrences	Extreme coldest year occurrences
British Columbia	60	0
Northwest Territories	0	1
Nunavut	0	76
Ontario	18	0

=== Extreme warmest year occurrences by location ===
City	Province	Occurrences
Halfmoon Bay	BC	13
Windsor	ON	11
Vancouver	BC	9
Chilliwack	BC	7
Victoria	BC	6
Qualicum Beach	BC	4
Nanaimo	BC	4
Chatham	ON	4
Pelee	ON	3
Saturna Island	BC	3
Lytton	BC	2
Port Coquitlam	BC	2

=== Extreme coldest year occurrences by location ===
City	Territory	Occurrences
Eureka	NU	68
Isachsen	NU	5
Resolute	NU	2
Alert	NU	1
Mould Bay	NT	1

== See also ==
- Weather extremes in Canada
- Temperature in Canada
