= Smith River (Liard River tributary) =

River in Yukon and British Columbia, known for Smith River Falls and Fort Halkett

The Smith River is a river in the Yukon Territory and the province of British Columbia, Canada, arising in the Yukon at 60°09′N 126°18′W and crossing the border to enter British Columbia at 60°00′00″N 126°23′25″W to its confluence with the Liard River at 59°33′00″N 126°29′00″W, between the confluences of the Toad and Coal Rivers. At the confluence is the site of the former Hudson's Bay Company trading post, Fort Halkett, and also Smith River Falls, which are jointly protected by Smith River Falls-Fort Halkett Provincial Park.

The settlement of Smith River is located upstream at the confluence of Shaw Creek, and is the site of the third-coldest temperature on record in Canada.

== See also ==
- Smith River (disambiguation)
- List of extreme temperatures in Canada
- List of rivers of British Columbia
- List of rivers of Yukon
