= Weather extremes in Canada =

This table shows record weather extremes in Canada.

Record	Extreme	Location	Date
Highest Temperature	49.6 °C (121.3 °F)	Lytton, British Columbia	June 29, 2021
Lowest Temperature	−63.0 °C (−81.4 °F)	Snag, Yukon	February 3, 1947
Greatest Rainfall (in 24 hours)	489.2 mm (19.26 in)	Ucluelet Brynnor Mines, British Columbia	October 6, 1967
Greatest Snowfall in one season*	2,446.5 centimetres (963.2 in)	Mount Copeland, British Columbia	1971–1972
Greatest Snowfall in one day	145 cm (57 in)	Tahtsa Lake, British Columbia	Feb 11, 1999
Highest Humidex reading	52.6 C (126.7 F)	Carman, Manitoba	July 25, 2007
Lowest Wind chill reading	-78.9 C (-110 F)	Kugaaruk, Nunavut	January 13, 1975
Hottest Month (Ave. Max.)	35.8 °C (96.4 °F)	Nashlyn, Saskatchewan	July 1936
Coldest Month (Ave. Min.)	−50.1 °C (−58.2 °F)	Eureka, Nunavut	February 1979
Greatest precipitation in one year	9,479 mm (373.2 in)	Hucuktlis Lake, British Columbia	1997
Least precipitation in one year	19.9 mm (0.78 in)	Rea Point, Nunavut	1978
Heaviest hailstone	292.71 g (0.65 lb)	Markerville, Alberta	August 1, 2022
Strongest tornado	F5 420–510 km/h (260–320 mph)	Elie, Manitoba	June 22, 2007
Greatest same-day temperature change	+43°C (+77.4°F)	Tatla Lake, British Columbia	January 5, 1982
Greatest one-day change in daily maximum temperature	-40.5°C (-72.9°F)	Ghost, Alberta	January 31-February 1, 1989
Lowest daily maximum temperature	-54.4°C (-66°F)	Mayo, Yukon	December 14, 1924
Highest all-time temperature anomaly in one place	-61.2°C (-78.2°F) to 39.4°C (103°F), totaling 100.6°C (181.2°F)	Fort Vermilion, Alberta	January 11, 1911; May 15, 1912

*A snowfall season is the amount of snow that falls between July 1 and June 30, spanning over the winter period.

== Provincial precipitation extremes ==
Least precipitation by province
Province	Driest Place	Average Annual Precipitation (mm)
British Columbia	Ashcroft	208
Yukon	Komakuk Beach	161
Alberta	Empress	291
Northwest Territories	Mould Bay	111
Saskatchewan	Alsask	299
Nunavut	Eureka	76
Manitoba	Churchill	432
Ontario	Big Trout Lake	609
Quebec	Inukjuak	460
New Brunswick	Belledune	970
Nova Scotia	Pugwash	1038.2
Prince Edward Island	Long River	1046
Newfoundland and Labrador	Wabush	852

Most precipitation by province
Province	Extreme Rainfall Location	Maximum Daily Rainfall (mm)	Date
British Columbia	Ucluelet	489	1967-10
Yukon	Quiet Lake	91	1972-7
Alberta	Eckville	213	1970-6
Northwest Territories	Fort Liard	100	1986-7
Saskatchewan	Cypress Hill	193	1998-6
Nunavut	Coral Harbour	128	1973-10
Manitoba	Stonewall	255	2026-6
Ontario	Harrow	264	1989-7
Quebec	Barrage des Quinze	172	1932-8
New Brunswick	Alma	179	1962-5
Nova Scotia	HRM	>250	2023-7
Prince Edward Island	Charlottetown	164	1942-9
Newfoundland & Labrador	Red Harbour	199	2005-3

Record Daily Snowfall Record in Each Province
Province	Extreme Rainfall Location	Maximum Daily Snowfall (cm)	Date
British Columbia	Tahtsa Lake West (Nechako Reservoir)	145.0	1999-02-11
Yukon	Burwash Landing	46.0	1999-10-31
Alberta	Calgary	48.4	1981-05-06
Northwest Territories	Tulita	61.5	1948-10-06
Saskatchewan	Collins Bay	57.4	1976-10-03
Nunavut	Kugaaruk	32.0	1993-03-23
Manitoba	Dauphin	76.2	1906-11-18
Ontario	Toronto	48.3	1944-12-11
Quebec	Lennoxville	64.3	1971-11-25
New Brunswick	Saint John	58.2	2011-12-23
Nova Scotia	Halifax	66.0	2004-02-19
Prince Edward Island	Georgetown	86.4	1894-01-14
Newfoundland & Labrador	St John's	76.2	2020-01-17

== See also ==
- List of extreme temperatures in Canada
- Temperature in Canada
- List of weather records
