= Smith River, British Columbia =

Smith River
- Location of Smith River in British Columbia
- Coordinates: 59°53′00″N 126°26′00″W
- Country: Canada
- Province: British Columbia

Smith River is an abandoned emergency airport and weather station in the Liard Country of far northern British Columbia, Canada. It is located southwest of the junction of Shaw Creek with the Smith River, which enters the Liard between the confluences of the Toad and Coal Rivers.

During World War II Smith River was built up and used as an airport base as defense against the Japanese if they should ever invade the mainland of North America. Nathaniel Lebans, a World War I Sapper with the Royal Engineers, supervised the construction of the emergency airport. Nat, or Slim, Lebans was from Blackville, New Brunswick and went to England to join the Royal Engineers in 1917. A 6000 ft long runway was built at Smith River, and the government maintained it until the 1970s, at which time the airport was abandoned. In the spring and summer of 1982, a forest fire consumed all the remaining buildings.

== Climate ==
It is located just south of the British Columbia-Yukon boundary, and is the location of the coldest temperature ever recorded in British Columbia and the eighth-coldest temperature on record in Canada: −58.9 °C (−74.0 °F), on January 31, 1947.

Climate data for Smith River (1941−1970 normals, extremes 1944−1969)
Month	Jan	Feb	Mar	Apr	May	Jun	Jul	Aug	Sep	Oct	Nov	Dec	Year
Record high °C (°F)	9 (49)	13 (55)	14 (57)	19 (67)	32 (89)	33 (92)	32 (89)	32 (89)	27 (80)	18 (65)	13 (56)	9 (48)	33 (92)
Mean daily maximum °C (°F)	−19.1 (−2.4)	−11.3 (11.6)	−2.7 (27.2)	5.5 (41.9)	13.9 (57.0)	19.0 (66.2)	20.9 (69.6)	19.0 (66.2)	13.0 (55.4)	4.2 (39.5)	−8.5 (16.7)	−16.6 (2.2)	3.1 (37.6)
Daily mean °C (°F)	−24.5 (−12.1)	−17.6 (0.4)	−9.9 (14.1)	−0.9 (30.4)	6.9 (44.5)	12.0 (53.6)	14.1 (57.4)	12.2 (54.0)	7.0 (44.6)	−0.7 (30.7)	−13.2 (8.2)	−21.5 (−6.7)	−3.0 (26.6)
Mean daily minimum °C (°F)	−29.8 (−21.7)	−23.7 (−10.7)	−17.2 (1.0)	−7.2 (19.0)	0.0 (32.0)	5.0 (41.0)	7.3 (45.1)	5.4 (41.7)	0.9 (33.7)	−5.6 (21.9)	−17.9 (−0.3)	−26.4 (−15.6)	−9.1 (15.6)
Record low °C (°F)	−59 (−74)	−54 (−66)	−46 (−50)	−36 (−32)	−13 (9)	−6 (21)	−2 (29)	−5 (23)	−19 (−2)	−31 (−24)	−48 (−55)	−53 (−63)	−59 (−74)
Average precipitation mm (inches)	38 (1.48)	29 (1.15)	25 (0.98)	21 (0.82)	27 (1.08)	56 (2.19)	68 (2.68)	49 (1.93)	40 (1.59)	37 (1.46)	38 (1.49)	37 (1.47)	465 (18.32)
Average rainfall mm (inches)	0.76 (0.03)	0.25 (0.01)	0.76 (0.03)	4.6 (0.18)	22 (0.85)	55 (2.16)	68 (2.68)	49 (1.93)	37 (1.46)	17 (0.68)	3.3 (0.13)	0.51 (0.02)	258 (10.16)
Average snowfall cm (inches)	37 (14.7)	29 (11.6)	25 (9.9)	17 (6.6)	5.8 (2.3)	0.51 (0.2)	0.0 (0.0)	trace	3.3 (1.3)	20 (8.0)	35 (13.9)	38 (14.8)	212 (83.3)
Average precipitation days (≥ 0.01 in)	16	14	11	9	8	12	13	11	11	13	14	16	148
Average rainy days (≥ 0.01 in)	trace	trace	trace	3	7	12	13	11	11	6	1	trace	64
Average snowy days (≥ 0.1 in)	15	14	11	7	2	trace	0	trace	1	8	14	16	88
Source: ECCC

== See also ==
- List of extreme temperatures in Canada
- Smith River Falls-Fort Halkett Provincial Park
