= Mount Copeland =

Mountain in British Columbia, Canada

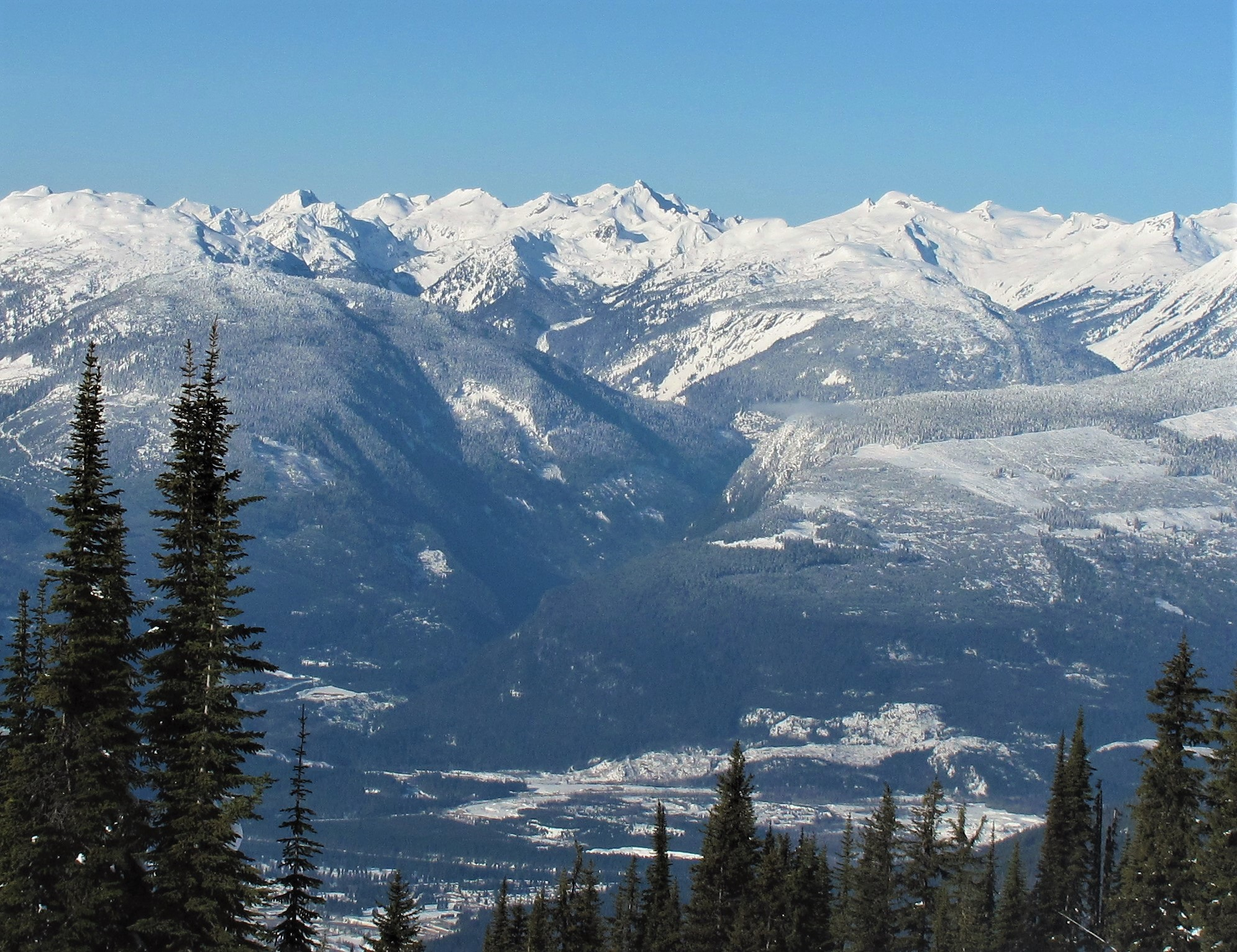
- Southeast aspect centered on horizon. (View from Revelstoke ski slopes)

Highest point
- Elevation: 2,556 m (8,386 ft)
- Prominence: 894 m (2,933 ft)
- Isolation: 10.1 km (6.3 mi)
- Listing: Mountains of British Columbia
- Coordinates: 51°07′24″N 118°25′20″W

Naming
- Etymology: Ralph Copeland

Geography
- Location within British Columbia Location within Canada
- Interactive map of Mount Copeland
- Country: Canada
- Province: British Columbia
- District: Kootenay Land District
- Parent range: Monashee Mountains
- Topo map: NTS 82M1 Mount Revelstoke

Mount Copeland is a summit in the Monashee Mountains to the northwest of Revelstoke, British Columbia, Canada. It was named in 1909, along with Copeland Creek (aka Wildgoose Creek) and Copeland Ridge, of which it is the summit, for Ralph Copeland (1837-1905), an English astronomer and the third Astronomer Royal for Scotland.

== Climate ==
Based on the Köppen climate classification, Mount Copeland is located in a subarctic climate zone with cold, snowy winters, and mild summers. Winter temperatures can drop below −20 °C with wind chill factors below −30 °C.

== Record snowfall ==
Mount Copeland is the site of the highest recorded snowfall in Canada in one season (July 1, 1971-June 30, 1972).

== See also ==
- Weather extremes in Canada
