= Smith River Falls – Fort Halkett Provincial Park =

Provincial park in British Columbia, Canada

Smith River Falls - Fort Halkett Provincial Park
- IUCN category II (national park)
- Location within British Columbia
- Interactive map of Smith River Falls - Fort Halkett Provincial Park
- Location: British Columbia, Canada
- Nearest city: Liard River
- Coordinates: 59°33′57″N 126°27′53″W
- Area: 2.54 km^{2} (0.98 sq mi)
- Established: April 11, 2001
- Governing body: BC Parks

Smith River Falls – Fort Halkett Provincial Park is a provincial park in British Columbia, Canada, protecting Smith River Falls and the former Fort Halkett, a Hudson's Bay Company trading post. The park is located at the confluence of the Smith and Liard Rivers.
