= Hucuktlis Lake =

Lake on Vancouver Island, Canada

Henderson Lake
- Location within Vancouver Island
- Location: Vancouver Island, British Columbia
- Coordinates: 49°05′37″N 125°02′18″W
- Lake type: Natural lake
- Primary inflows: Clemens Creek
- Primary outflows: Henderson River
- Basin countries: Canada

Hucuktlis Lake, also known as Henderson Lake, is a lake on Vancouver Island that drains south into head of Uchucklesaht Inlet on the north side of lower Alberni Inlet.

== Etymology ==
Hucuktlis (pronounced "who chook-tlis") means "place way inside", which refers to the inland nature of the lake relative to Uchucklesit Inlet. The Uchucklesaht traditionally used this lake as well as the lands and mountains around the lake for their spiritual practices.

== History ==
In 1917, Henderson Lake was adopted as the official name of the lake, correcting a map error featured in a 1912 map of the region.

In 2018, the official name of the lake was changed to Hucuktlis Lake upon the recommendation of the Uchucklesaht First Nation. The name change was supported by the Alberni-Clayoquot Regional District.

== Geography ==
The lake is located 23 kilometres (17 mi) southwest of Port Alberni, Vancouver Island. Clemens Creek flows into the northern tip of the lake. The Hucuktlis River drains the lake into the northern end of Uchucklesit Inlet, an arm of Alberni Inlet.

== Climate ==
Weather data from the Hucuktlis Lake fish hatchery shows that the lake is situated in the wettest place in North America. Hucuktlis Lake averages 6,903 mm (271.8 in) of precipitation, and in 1997 9,307 mm (366.4 in) fell, setting the all-time Canadian record.

== See also ==
- List of lakes of British Columbia
- Weather extremes in Canada
- Wettest places on Earth
