= Collegeville, Nova Scotia =

Collegeville
- Community
- Location in Nova Scotia
- Coordinates: 45°29′28″N 62°00′54″W
- Country: Canada
- Province: Nova Scotia
- County: Antigonish County
- Time zone: UTC-4 (AST)
  - Summer (DST): UTC-3 (ADT)
- Area code: 902

Collegeville is the former name for the community of Ashdale, a community in Antigonish County, Nova Scotia, Canada. It is located roughly 15 kilometres (9.3 mi) southwest of the town of Antigonish. The highest temperature ever recorded in Nova Scotia occurred at the Collegeville climate station, when on 19 August 1935 the mercury climbed to 38.3 °C (100.9 °F).

The Environment Canada weather station in Ashdale retains the name Collegeville. The Collegeville post office opened June 1, 1887 and closed February 29, 1932. During the 2nd World War, the weather station and the Ashdale school shared accommodations at the old school house at 15 Ashdale school road now owned by the Wallace family. Of note, the highest temperature ever recorded in NS was at this location. On August 19, 1935 a temperature of 38.3 was recorded at the schoolhouse in Ashdale.

== Climate ==
Climate data for Collegeville, Nova Scotia, 1991–2020 normals, extremes 1916–present
Month	Jan	Feb	Mar	Apr	May	Jun	Jul	Aug	Sep	Oct	Nov	Dec	Year
Record high °C (°F)	17.0 (62.6)	15.5 (59.9)	26.5 (79.7)	29.0 (84.2)	33.9 (93.0)	35.0 (95.0)	36.1 (97.0)	38.3 (100.9)	34.4 (93.9)	29.8 (85.6)	25.6 (78.1)	19.0 (66.2)	38.3 (100.9)
Mean daily maximum °C (°F)	−1.0 (30.2)	−1.0 (30.2)	2.8 (37.0)	8.1 (46.6)	15.1 (59.2)	20.2 (68.4)	24.5 (76.1)	24.3 (75.7)	20.2 (68.4)	13.7 (56.7)	8.1 (46.6)	2.1 (35.8)	11.4 (52.5)
Daily mean °C (°F)	−5.7 (21.7)	−5.8 (21.6)	−1.9 (28.6)	3.4 (38.1)	9.1 (48.4)	14.1 (57.4)	18.6 (65.5)	18.5 (65.3)	14.3 (57.7)	8.6 (47.5)	3.8 (38.8)	−1.8 (28.8)	6.3 (43.3)
Mean daily minimum °C (°F)	−10.4 (13.3)	−10.6 (12.9)	−6.5 (20.3)	−1.4 (29.5)	3.2 (37.8)	8.0 (46.4)	12.7 (54.9)	12.6 (54.7)	8.4 (47.1)	3.4 (38.1)	−0.6 (30.9)	−5.7 (21.7)	1.1 (34.0)
Record low °C (°F)	−34.4 (−29.9)	−37.2 (−35.0)	−30.6 (−23.1)	−23.3 (−9.9)	−8.0 (17.6)	−4.4 (24.1)	−1.1 (30.0)	−0.6 (30.9)	−6.7 (19.9)	−10.0 (14.0)	−18.9 (−2.0)	−30.5 (−22.9)	−37.2 (−35.0)
Average precipitation mm (inches)	80.8 (3.18)	83.1 (3.27)	83.2 (3.28)	60.3 (2.37)	77.9 (3.07)	86.4 (3.40)	80.3 (3.16)	95.5 (3.76)	106.2 (4.18)	133.5 (5.26)	129.8 (5.11)	105.1 (4.14)	1,122 (44.17)
Average rainfall mm (inches)	43.2 (1.70)	38.1 (1.50)	54.0 (2.13)	48.0 (1.89)	73.9 (2.91)	85.8 (3.38)	79.7 (3.14)	95.5 (3.76)	108.6 (4.28)	130.8 (5.15)	118.5 (4.67)	61.6 (2.43)	937.9 (36.93)
Average snowfall cm (inches)	35.1 (13.8)	43.6 (17.2)	27.0 (10.6)	10.2 (4.0)	0.5 (0.2)	0.0 (0.0)	0.0 (0.0)	0.0 (0.0)	0.0 (0.0)	0.6 (0.2)	7.5 (3.0)	37.5 (14.8)	161.9 (63.7)
Source: Environment Canada
