= Snag, Yukon =

Snag
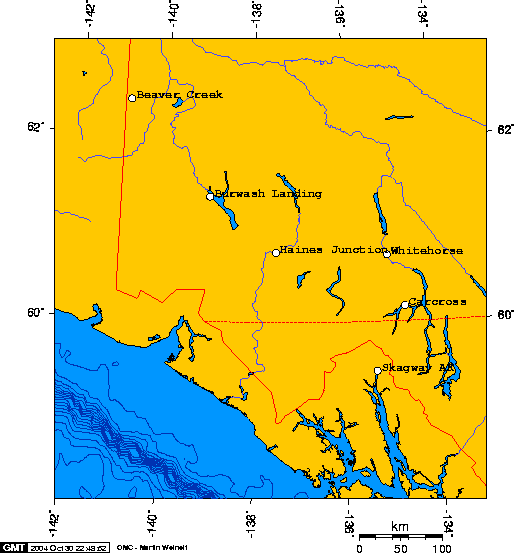
- Location east of Beaver Creek, Yukon

- Location of Snag Snag (Canada) Snag (North America)
- Coordinates: 62°24′02″N 140°21′50″W
- Country: Canada
- Territory: Yukon

Population (2021)
  - Total: 0 (closed)
- Time zone: UTC−07:00 (MST)
- Area code: 867
- NTS map: 115K8 Snag Creek

Snag is a former village in Yukon, Canada, located on a small, dry-weather sideroad off the Alaska Highway, 25 km (16 mi) east of Beaver Creek. The village of Snag was located in a bowl-shaped valley of the White River and its tributaries, including Snag Creek. It was first settled during the Klondike Gold Rush. A village of Indigenous peoples was also located approximately 8 km (5.0 mi) away. It was the site of a military airfield, established as part of the Northwest Staging Route, which closed in 1968. In 1947, the village of Snag had a population of eight to ten First Nations people and fur traders. An additional staff of fifteen to twenty airport personnel — meteorologists, radio operators, aircraft maintenance men — lived at the airport barracks.

== Climate ==
Snag has a subarctic climate (Köppen climate classification Dfc) with mild summers and severely cold and long winters.

On February 2, 1947, Snag recorded a temperature of −62.2 °C (−80.0 °F), beating the continental North American record-low temperature that until then, belonged to Fort Good Hope, Northwest Territories, when it reached −61.7 °C (−79.1 °F) on December 31, 1910. The next day, on February 3, 1947, the record was beaten again in Snag; −63.0 °C (−81.4 °F). There was a clear sky (except for some ice fog), and little to no wind. There were 38.1 cm (15.00 in) of snow on the ground, but the level had been in decline. According to weather observer Wilf Blezard, the voices of humans and dogs at the village could be heard from the local airport, four miles away; furthermore, people could see and hear their own breath solidifying.

Another town 180 km (110 mi) northeast of Snag, Fort Selkirk, claimed an even lower temperature of −65.0 °C (−85.0 °F), but the claim could not be confirmed.

Climate data for Snag (Snag Airport) Coordinates 62°22′N 140°24′W; elevation: 587 m (1,926 ft); 1951−1980 normals
Month	Jan	Feb	Mar	Apr	May	Jun	Jul	Aug	Sep	Oct	Nov	Dec	Year
Record high °C (°F)	7.8 (46.0)	7.2 (45.0)	13.3 (55.9)	22.2 (72.0)	30.0 (86.0)	31.7 (89.1)	31.7 (89.1)	30.6 (87.1)	27.2 (81.0)	18.3 (64.9)	7.2 (45.0)	4.4 (39.9)	31.7 (89.1)
Mean daily maximum °C (°F)	−25.1 (−13.2)	−14.8 (5.4)	−4.6 (23.7)	5.5 (41.9)	13.5 (56.3)	19.3 (66.7)	20.9 (69.6)	18.8 (65.8)	11.9 (53.4)	−0.6 (30.9)	−14.2 (6.4)	−23.1 (−9.6)	0.6 (33.1)
Daily mean °C (°F)	−30.4 (−22.7)	−22.0 (−7.6)	−14.1 (6.6)	−2.2 (28.0)	6.4 (43.5)	12.0 (53.6)	14.0 (57.2)	11.5 (52.7)	5.2 (41.4)	−6.1 (21.0)	−19.3 (−2.7)	−28.2 (−18.8)	−6.1 (21.0)
Mean daily minimum °C (°F)	−35.6 (−32.1)	−29.3 (−20.7)	−23.6 (−10.5)	−9.9 (14.2)	−0.7 (30.7)	4.8 (40.6)	7.0 (44.6)	4.2 (39.6)	−1.7 (28.9)	−11.6 (11.1)	−24.4 (−11.9)	−33.1 (−27.6)	−12.8 (9.0)
Record low °C (°F)	−61.1 (−78.0)	−63.0 (−81.4)	−51.1 (−60.0)	−46.1 (−51.0)	−16.1 (3.0)	−5.0 (23.0)	−1.7 (28.9)	−10.6 (12.9)	−18.9 (−2.0)	−33.3 (−27.9)	−52.8 (−63.0)	−56.1 (−69.0)	−63.0 (−81.4)
Average precipitation mm (inches)	17.2 (0.68)	16.0 (0.63)	12.4 (0.49)	17.9 (0.70)	28.9 (1.14)	58.3 (2.30)	61.1 (2.41)	39.0 (1.54)	29.0 (1.14)	21.0 (0.83)	18.8 (0.74)	18.9 (0.74)	338.5 (13.33)
Average rainfall mm (inches)	0.1 (0.00)	0.0 (0.0)	0.1 (0.00)	4.8 (0.19)	23.2 (0.91)	57.7 (2.27)	61.1 (2.41)	38.4 (1.51)	22 (0.9)	1.8 (0.07)	0.5 (0.02)	0.0 (0.0)	209.7 (8.26)
Average snowfall cm (inches)	23.4 (9.2)	17.1 (6.7)	15.3 (6.0)	12.2 (4.8)	7.3 (2.9)	1.1 (0.4)	0.0 (0.0)	3.6 (1.4)	6.2 (2.4)	21 (8.3)	23.8 (9.4)	23.7 (9.3)	154.7 (60.9)
Average precipitation days (≥ 0.2 mm)	9	8	9	6	9	13	16	13	10	9	10	10	122
Average rainy days (≥ 0.2 mm)	0	0	0	0	8	14	16	12	8	1	0	0	59
Average snowy days (≥ 0.2 cm)	10	9	9	6	2	0	0	1	2	9	11	11	70
Average relative humidity (%) (at 1300 LST)	84	80	68	54	45	47	55	57	62	78	84	84	67
Source: Environment and Climate Change Canada (temperatures) (precipitation) (humidity} (February minimum)

== Disappearance of aircraft ==
On January 26, 1950, a Douglas C-54 Skymaster (tail number 42-72469) of the United States Air Force, with thirty-four service personnel, two civilians and a crew of eight, disappeared on a flight from Alaska to Montana. It was in the vicinity of Snag when last contact was made by radio at 17:09. As of 2026, no wreckage or remains have been located.
