= Birch Island, British Columbia =

Birch Island
- Community
- Location of Birch Island in British Columbia
- Coordinates: 51°35′59″N 119°55′04″W
- Country: Canada
- Province: British Columbia
- Region: Thompson Country
- Regional district: Thompson-Nicola
- Time zone: UTC−07:00 (PT)
- Area codes: 250, 778, 236, & 672
- Highways: Highway 5
- Waterways: North Thompson River

Birch Island is an unincorporated community in the Thompson region of south central British Columbia. The former ferry site is by the mouth of Foghorn Creek and straddles the North Thompson River. On BC Highway 5, the locality is by road about 137 kilometres (85 mi) north of Kamloops and 99 kilometres (62 mi) southwest of Blue River.

== Pioneer settlers and name origin ==
When settlers came into the valley during the early 1900s, a community developed on the south shore upon land largely owned by Robert (Bob) Alexander. Adjacent to the east, A. Wynne had an 32-hectare (80-acre) property, later losing his orchard to the Canadian Northern Railway (CNoR) right-of-way. In the early 1910s, the railway construction camp was east of Wynne's place, while meat to feed the workers was butchered on Birch Island, which was unofficially called Butcher's Island at the time. When asked to name the station, Sara Holt (the only woman then living on the flat) suggested Birch Island, because of the birch trees on the island visible from the rail bridge. Former names for the locality included Wynne's Flat and Umbrella Flat. The earliest newspaper reference to the new name was September 1913. That decade, settlement began on the north side of the river. Before the coming of the railway, the flat was the terminus for paddle steamers from Kamloops.

== Railway ==
In September 1913, the eastward advance of the CNoR rail head reached the location and the temporary rail bridge (east of the settlement) over the North Thompson was finished. The permanent seven-span 180-metre (600 ft) railway bridge was nearing completion by yearend.

The station opened in 1915 and became a convenient passing point, being about halfway along the predominantly single-track subdivision. Westbound freight trains stopped for hot box inspections Within a decade, a water tower, coal dock, wye, and 24-hour telegraph operators were present.

The Birch Island passing track was 618 metres (2,029 ft) in 1916, progressively extending to the current 3,974 metres (13,038 ft).

In 1928, 12 cars of a wheat train derailed, spilling the contents. Months later, a locomotive struck a landslide 8 kilometres (5 mi) east, uncoupled, and rolled down a bank. The baggage and express cars of the eastbound passenger train merely derailed. Erected later that year, the Canadian National Railway (CN) repeater station boosted CN and CBC signals.

In 1929, the river was temporarily diverted to allow repairs to the rail bridge damaged by the previous year's flood. However, the diversion washed away several acres of Bill Hayworth's land. The thieves who later murdered Bill for his compensation money were never identified.

In 1931, 12 cars of a grain train plunged into the river after a nearby small bridge collapsed.

In 1941, the section foreman fell from the railway bridge. The body of the drowning victim was recovered at Clearwater over three months later.

In the 1940s, stockyards were erected. The station basically closed in 1964. However, sheep loadings continued until 1970.

In 1951, a conductor burned to death when three gondola cars and the caboose from a freight train plunged from the rails.

In 1955, a man who shot the marker off the caboose of a moving freight train received a 30-day sentence.

In 1967, the train station was demolished and burned.

In 1993, a train destroyed a truck at a private railway crossing.

In 1995, eight cars derailed on the eastern approach to the bridge and plunged down the river embankment.

In 2006, a rail car loaded with burning potash pulled into the siding.

In 2007, a 24-year-old woman, who flung herself from the window of a passing Via Rail train, suffered only minor injuries.

CN Train Timetables (Regular stop or Flag stop)
	Mile	1916	1923	1927	1933	1938	1943	1947	1950	1956	1960	1963	1965	1971	1971
Boulder	2608.4	Regular	Regular	Regular			Flag		Flag	Flag	Flag	Flag			
Black Pool	2599.7		Regular	Regular			Flag		Flag	Flag	Both	Both			
Clearwater	2593.7	Regular		Regular	Regular	Flag	Flag	Flag	Flag	Flag	Flag	Flag	^{a}	^{a}	^{a}
Birch Island	2587.6	Regular	Regular	Regular	Regular	Both	Both	Both	Both	Both	Both	Both	^{a}	^{a}	
Vavenby	2579.0	Regular	Regular	Regular			Flag		Flag	Flag	Flag	Flag	^{a}	^{a}	^{a}
Irvine	2573.1	Regular	Regular	Regular			Flag		Flag	Flag	Flag				
Wabron	2567.3						Flag		Flag	Flag	Flag	Flag			

^a. Pre-arranged stop only.

== Community ==
A forest ranger headquarters existed from the mid-1910s to 1971. In 1917, the first general store opened. Margaret Squibb was the inaugural postmaster 1917–1924. The school opened around 1920 and the schoolhouse, which was built in 1922, opened in the new year.

During the mid-1920s to 1970s, the community was the centre for valley residents.

In 1922, J. Popp opened the first hotel/boarding house. After burning to the ground in 1928, rebuilding was immediate. In the mid-1920s, the community hall was built. On the adjacent site in 1938, the St. John and St. Paul Anglican Church was built and dedicated. In the mid-1930s, a cemetery was established.

The creation of larger BC school districts in 1946 included School District 26 (Birch Island) stretching from Roundtop to Blue River. When the administrative centre moved to Clearwater in the early 1970s, the school district was renamed North Thompson.

About 1951, Rexspar Mines purchased the community hall and site for a bunkhouse and storage, while exploring possible development of uranium mining on Granite Mountain to the south. The project was not pursued and public opposition blocked an attempted revival in the late 1970s. The hall burned down in 1970.

Comprising two classrooms, a library, and indoor plumbing, a larger school building opened in 1956. The former one-room schoolhouse was moved to the edge of the property and used as a community hall for over two decades. The 10-room hotel operated until burning down in 1960. It is unclear whether the adjacent service station closed at the same time.

In 1962, BC Hydro transmission lines introduced electricity to the community. In 1965, automatic telephone dialing was installed.

In 1969, Chuck Dee, wife Anna Mae, and family, came to join his father at Birch Island, and they built a general store on the north shore. After a few owners, the store closed for a period, but Chuck's son Rick acquired the property in 1990. Re-opened the next year, Rick and Marie Dee have been running the business since that time. A gas bar existed as late as the mid-2000s.

In 1978, a light plane crashed near the church. The south shore store closed in 1979 and was demolished in 1984. The post office closed in 1986. After the school closed in 1984, the Royal Canadian Legion Branch 259 leased the building for over a decade, and it later became the community centre.

In 1999, the former school grounds became a community park.

The final service at the Anglican church was held in October 2005. The church became a private property.

In 2015, a large number attended the centenary celebration of the hamlet held at the Birch Island Community Park.

The campground, which opened in the mid-1990s, comprises 40 sites.

Agriculture, forestry, and tourism make up the local economy.

== Ferry, bridge, and roads ==
In 1916, a subsidised reaction ferry was installed.

In 1927, a new larger wooden ferry was constructed. By that time, the river ice was seasonally blasted to create a channel, and an aerial cage ferry for passengers crossed during the wintertime.

During 1930 and 1931, a Kamloops–Birch Island stage operated. A highways maintenance yard existed from the early 1930s to early 2001.

In 1935, the surplus former Vinsulla–Black Pines ferry was installed.

During construction of the road bridge across the river, a worker broke both arms and a leg on falling 6.1 metres (20 ft) to the deck. On opening in 1939, the bridge, which comprised two 43-metre (140 ft) spans and trestle approach, replaced the ferry.

North River Coach Lines, which had operated Kamloops–Little Fort, extended the route northward to Birch Island in 1946, and farther eastward to Vavenby in 1951–52. At that time, the highway north from Heffley Creek to Vavenby was a fair gravel road, and from Vavenby to Blue River was a poor secondary road. For travel east of Birch Island, vehicles could be transported upon a CN flatcar.

In 1958, Yellowhead Coach Lines bought North River Coach Lines. In 1964, Yellowhead Coach Lines extended the route northeastward to Avola for three days per week. The next year, B.C. Coach Lines acquired the company.

In January 2005, an ice jam severely damaged the original Howe truss bridge and caused extensive flooding. After temporary repairs, a five-tonne weight restriction was placed upon the structure. The concrete replacement bridge built alongside opened late that year.

BC Transit provides weekday services. The Birch Island Rest Area, which lies off the highway to the west, offers picnic tables and washroom facilities.

== Notable people ==
- Bud Smith, childhood resident.

== Maps ==
- Birch Island trail map, 1924.
- "Shell BC map". www.davidrumsey.com. 1956.

== See also ==
- List of Inland Ferries in British Columbia
