= Dunn Peak =

Mountain in British Columbia, Canada

- Dunn Peaks
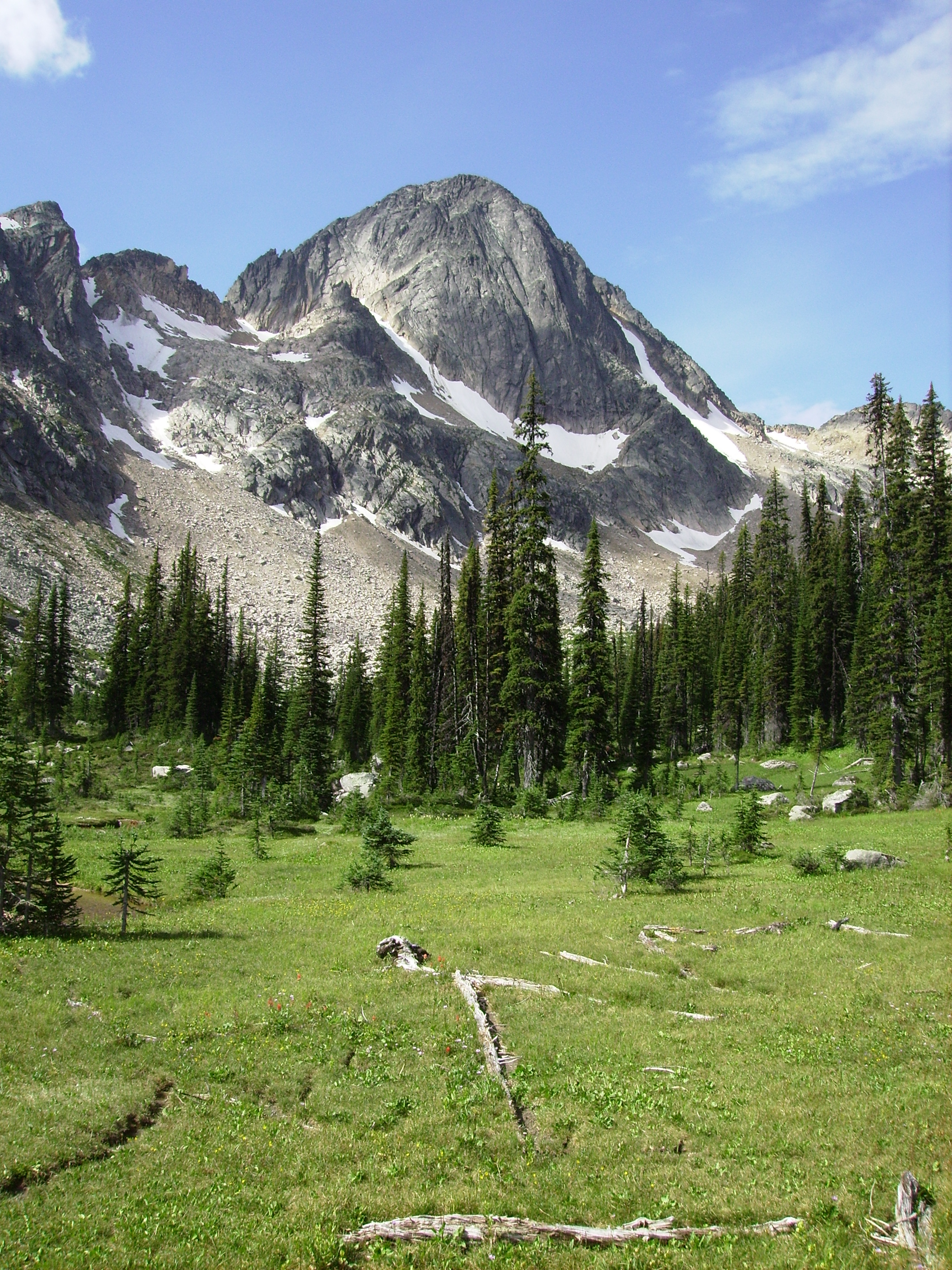
- Matterhorn Peak in the Dunn Peak massif

Highest point
- Elevation: 2,636 m (8,648 ft)
- Prominence: 1,531 m (5,023 ft)
- Parent peak: Hallam Peak
- Listing: Mountains of British Columbia; Canada prominent peaks 127th
- Coordinates: 51°26′14″N 119°57′17″W

Geography
- Location within British Columbia
- Location: British Columbia, Canada
- District: Yale Division Yale Land District
- Parent range: Shuswap Highland
- Topo map: NTS 82M5 North Barrière Lake

Dunn Peak (sometimes known locally as the Dunn Peaks) is a group of peaks in the central Interior of British Columbia, Canada. Its most prominent summit, Matterhorn Peak, rises to 2,636 metres (8,648 ft), making it the highest point in the Shuswap Highland. The peak and its surroundings are contained in Dunn Peak Provincial Park.

== Geography ==
Though technically part of the Columbia Mountains to the north and east, the Dunn massif is isolated from other ranges by the Interior Plateau and the Shuswap Highland. The group is bounded by the North Thompson River to the west and north, Harper Creek to the east, and the Barrière River to the south. The nearest towns and cities are Barriere, Clearwater, and Kamloops. As there are no roads in the protected area, access to the alpine area is by trail via the Harper Creek Forest Service road.

Matterhorn Peak is the 92nd most prominent peak in British Columbia.

== Ecology ==
The protected area surrounding the peaks contains old-growth forest, including stands of Engelmann spruce and interior Douglas fir. The park also contains significant wildlife populations, including wolf, cougar, marten, river otter, black bear, mule deer and mountain goat. Several protected avian species are present, such as the great blue heron and bald eagle.

== History ==
James Dunn was a gold prospector in the region who left for California in 1888 after falling sick. He had mined gold with a "rocker" near ChuChua, on the western slopes of Dunn Peak. Nearby Baldy Mountain was the site of the Windpass gold mine from 1916 until 1939. On April 30, 1996, the massif became the central point of the new 19,353-hectare (47,820-acre) Dunn Peak Provincial Park.

== Gallery ==
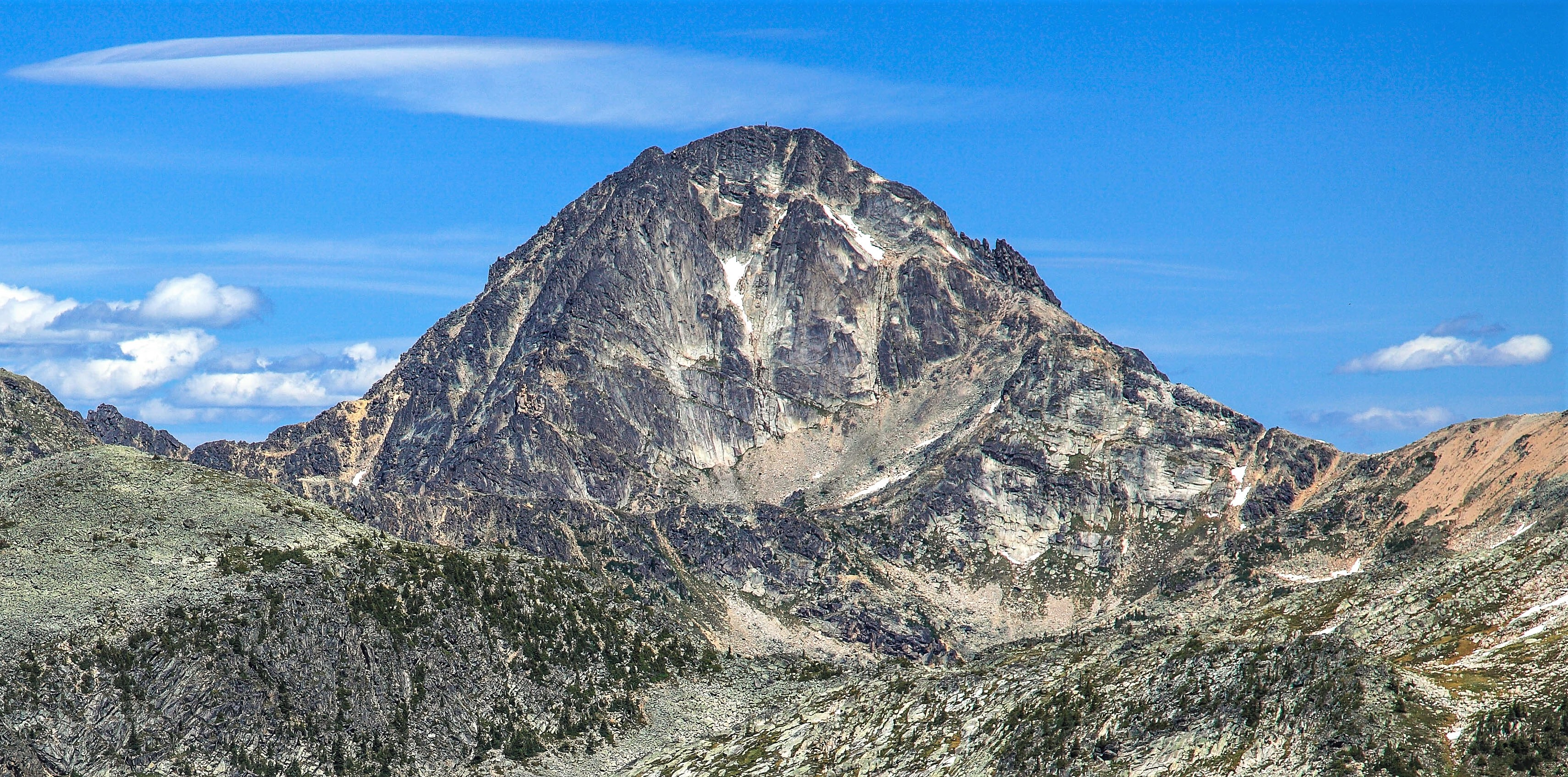
Southwest aspect
