= Simpcw First Nation =

The Simpcw First Nation, formerly known as the North Thompson Indian Band, is a First Nations band government based in the Thompson Country of British Columbia, Canada. It is a member of the Shuswap Nation Tribal Council. It is a First Nations government of the Secwepemc (Shuswap) Nation, located in the Central Interior region of the Canadian province of British Columbia. The band's main community is at Chu Chua, British Columbia. Four of the five First Nation Reserves in Simpcw territory were designated on July 5, 1877, and the fifth was designated on February 24, 1916. The Shuswap language name for North Thompson Band's community and reserve is 'Simpcw'.

== Chief and councillors ==
The current Kukwpi7 (Chief), George Lampreau, was re-elected on April 14, 2024, for a three-year term. The Tkwenem7iple7 (Council) members are Alison Green, Doreen Jules, Ron Lampreau, Simone Lampreau, Tina Donald, and Tracey Eustache.

== Treaty process ==
Simpcw First Nation is currently not involved in the treaty process and has never ceded or surrendered any of their land.

== History ==
The Simpcw inhabit Simpcwúl̓ecw, an area now known in English as the North Thompson. Simpcw lands include an area from McLure to McBride, from Jasper to the headwaters of the Athabasca. The Simpcw collected local plants and animals for survival and employed various methods for fishing. An example of a kind of fishing barrier observed in the Barrière River was described by George Mercer Dawson as "two weirs or fences each of which stretched completely across the stream." The Simpcw interacted with other First Nations in British Columbia and Alberta.

Early interactions with Europeans began around the start of the nineteenth century with fur traders. Alexander Ross wrote that David Stuart came to the area to spend the winter of 1811–12. Stuart's wrote of his visit that after being blocked from a return to Fort Astoria by snow "[we] passed our time with the She Whaps and other tribes in that quarter." Ross came himself in May 1812 to establish 'Fort Cumcloups' where he "sent messages to the different tribes around who soon assembled bringing with them their furs. Here we stayed for ten days The number of Indians collected on the occasion could not have been less than 2,000." Alexander Ross's account of a journey in about 1815 describes some meetings specifically in the North Thompson. Describing his journey from Kamloops to the Rocky mountains he writes,

"I therefore received orders from head quarters to examine the eastern section, lying between the She-whaps and the Rocky Mountains." He wrote about meeting some families near East Barriere Lake, "We left Fort She-whaps on the 14th day of August...At the outset we proceeded up the North, or Sun-tea-coot-a-coot River, for three days; then turning to the right, we took to the woods, steering our course in the eye of the rising sun, nearly midway between Thompson's River on the south, and Fraser's River on the north. The first day after turning our back on North River, we made but little progress; but what we made was in an easterly direction. The second day our courses per compass were, ESE 6 miles, E 4 miles, SE 2 miles, E by N 5 miles, E 1 mile, NE 2 miles, NNE 4miles: we then encamped. The country through which we passed this day was covered with heavy timber, but having clear bottom and being good travelling, with here and there small open plains. During the third day the face of the country became timberless, with frequently open clear ground, so that we made a long day's journey. In the evening we fell upon a small lake, on the northern margin of which we encamped for the night. Here we found two Indian families, living on fish roots, and berries, which they were all employed in procuring: they belonged to the Sun-tea-coot-a-coot tribe, and seemed...to live very comfortably and happily. One of the men belonging to these families, who pretended to have a perfect knowledge of the country through which we had to pass, volunteered to accompany us as a guide; for which services I promised to reward him with a blanket and some ammunition when we returned...Leaving this place, which we called Friendly Lake..."

The lake called by Ross "Friendly Lake" is identified as East Barriere Lake by Kenneth A. Spaulding in his edited edition of Ross's account.

Ross also notes the extent of the area with which the guide he met near East Barriere Lake was familiar when he writes after reaching Eagle Hill, "As we journeyed along our guide took us up to another height and pointing out to us the country generally, said he had passed and repassed through various parts of it seven different times, and in as many different places; he seemed to know it well, and observed that the road we had travelled, with all its difficulties, was the very best to be found."

On the way back to Canoe River and passing 'a considerable lake' they returned to 'Friendly Lake' where the guide's family had departed, but had left behind a stick with a certain notch, stuck in the ground with a certain lean which indicated to their guide where his family had gone. Spaulding identified the 'considerable lake' as Adams Lake.

In 1828, Archibald McDonald kept a journal of a trip from Hudson's Bay to the Pacific Ocean. In an entry for October 3 he described meeting Chief Cinnitza at 'the Fort' after a traverse of the 'North River'. On October the 4th he wrote, "At Barrier Village by eight." And described a breakfast at eleven "surrounded by the Indians of the Barrier."

McDonald lists "Shin-poos (of the north branch of the Thompson)" as one of seven tribes that traded at Fort Kamloops in the reports of his father, Angus McDonald. And writes, "As to the Shin-poos, a mountain race, a remnant of the 'Snare Indians', my father in his report says, that there were but few of them (about 60 families) and that they did not come very regularly to the Fort."

McDonald also copied the following from his father's report to the Governor and Council reporting on the spring of 1823: "This Tribe (the Shin-poo) inhabits the north branch of Thompsons River. They are good beaver hunters, and go sometimes to and even east of the Rocky Mountains—I had in view to have one or two men to accompany them all summer, so as to endeavor to meet the Gentlemen (that is to say the Express and Passengers coming in by Rocky Mountain Portage) coming to the Columbia next fall, at the little House (which I believe was at the east end of the Portage) which would be by far a nearer and more practicable way of obtaining a knowledge of the country about the heads of the Thompson and N Branch than by sending from the east side, as Mr Annance was, last summer: the Tribe not having come to the Port this Spring prevents my sending with them." Chief Cinnitza was mentioned by Archibald McDonald from a trip in 1828. Chief André is mentioned in records from the time of settling First Nation Reserves in 1877 as well as being a signatory to the Memorial to Frank Oliver in 1911.

In 1862 a gold rush in the Cariboo brought smallpox to the area which caused many deaths, reducing the population to "the merest handful." From the 1890s to 1970 children were taken to the Kamloops Indian Residential School where life was harsh and use of their own language was forbidden. Some Simpcw served in the Second World War.

In 1909 anthropologist James Teit recorded "opinions held by the tribe regarding the qualities and average characteristics of their neighbors and also of the several divisions of their own people in former days." Of the 'North Thompson' he wrote that, "The North Thompson division were probably the best hunters and greatest travellers. They were mild, quiet, steady, rather serious, hospitable, rather poor."

In August 1916, the Simpcw people of the Tête Jaune Cache were forcibly relocated out of the area to Chu Chua and other places. The people were made to travel the 300 kilometres by foot. In August 2016 events were held to mark the 100th anniversary of that event. The people of the Simpcw First Nation have made applications to the government to have lands at Tête Jaune Cache formally recognized.

The Simpcw have been known in English by different names, "The name of the North Thompson Band, simpxʷwemx...also known in English to traders as people of the North Fork of Thompson River, was spelled Chin-Poo by [John] McLeod (1823) and [Archibald] McDonald (1827), Shinpoo by the Oblate Missionaries...and Nsi'mpxemux̣ by Teit. Their former main village, ciqʷceqʷélqʷ 'red willows' (Cornus stolonifera)...was referred to as Tsuk-tsuk-kwalk, erroneously translated as 'red pine' by Dawson...and as Tcoqtceqwa'llk by Teit. The reserve name Chu Chua is not derived from this but is an anglicization of texʷcwex 'creek running through the bush'."

== Demographics ==
The Simpcw First Nation currently has 724 members.

Archibald McDonald reported that in about the 1820s his father wrote that there was about sixty Simpcw families. In 1883 a government report on population listed "North Thompson and Canoe Lake: 144." In 1850 the population after being reduced by foreign infections was estimated at 250, in 1906 the population was down to 70.

== Economic development ==
The Simpcw First Nation has a highly developed and active economic development organization currently known as the Simpcw Resources Group of Companies (SRG)

== Social, educational and cultural programs and facilities ==
Simpcw Fisheries manages and operates a hatchery called Dunn Lake Hatchery. Simpcw hosts a special 'Coho Day' in October at the hatchery.

Neqweyqwelsten School is an elementary school located in Chu Chua. It is open to all Simpcw First Nation and community members, as well as non-members if space is available.

== First Nation Reserves ==
First Nation Reserves under the administration of the Simpcw First Nation are:

- North Thompson 1 (07186), 1236.1 ha, "Kamloops District on the east bank of the North Thompson River about 45 miles north of Kamloops."
- Nekalliston 2 (07187), 1.4 ha, "Kamloops District near Little Fort and opposite Nekalliston Creek 50 miles north of Kamloops."
- Barriere River 3A (07188), 1.6 ha, "Kamloops District on left bank of the Barrière River about 2 miles from mouth of the North Thompson River."
- Louis Creek 4 (07189), 3 ha, "Kamloops District on the left bank of Louis Creek about ¼ mile from its confluence with North Thompson River about 34 miles north of Kamloops."
- Boulder Creek 5 (07190), 280 ha "Kamloops District, Lot 4088, north of Dunn Lake."

In the 1870s the government created the Red Trees Reserve at Chu Chua without consulting with the Simpcw. In the report of a survey of 1872, Alfred R C Selwyn mentions two stays at what he calls the "Red Pine Reserve".

Records of decisions on the reserves are listed online in the BC Provincial Collection at the Federal and Provincial Collections of Minutes of Decision, Correspondence, and Sketches which is a collection of materials produced by the Joint Indian Reserve Commission and Indian Reserve Commission from 1876–1910. Decisions for North Thompson 1, Nekalliston 2, Barriere River 3, and Louis Creek 4 are item 1081/78, from July 5, 1877. Barriere River 3 was sold in 1921 in exchange for Barriere River 3A.

These decisions were made by A. C. Anderson during a trip up the North Thompson River with Chief André on July 3–5, 1877 to as far as Little Fort. This decision was made at a time when other First Nations in the area were considering going to war over their treatment by the government.

The sale of Barriere River 3 and the Boulder Creek reserve are listed in the 1943 Schedule. Boulder Creek was allotted by Royal Commission on February 24, 1916.

== See also ==
- Shuswap Nation Tribal Council
- School District 73 Secwepemc Resources
- Dunford, Murial Poulton. "The Simpcw of the North Thompson" British Columbia Historical News, Vol. 35, No. 3, Summer 2002
- Secwépemc Lands and Resources Law Research Project
- First Nation Profile at Indigenous and Northern Affairs Canada
- The New Trail of Tears: How Washington Is Destroying American Indians
- Ignace, Marianne (1998). "Shuswap" in Handbook of North American Indians, Volume 12
- Harris, R. Cole (2002). Making Native Space: Colonialism, Resistance, and Reserves in British Columbia
- Ignace, Ron (2008). Our Oral Histories Are Our Iron Posts: Secwepemc Stories and Historical Consciousness, doctoral thesis, Simon Fraser University.
- Anderson, Nancy Marguerite (2011). The Pathfinder: A.C. Anderson’s Journeys in the West. Heritage House Publishing.
  - Chapter 28 (page 201ff), 'Hawking About the Country: 1877-1883' describes Anderson's work with the Indian Reserve Commission in the Kamloops area.
- McDonald, Archibald (1872). McLeod, Malcolm, ed. Peace River: A Canoe Voyage from Hudson's Bay to Pacific by the Late Sir George Simpson; in 1828. Ottawa: J. Durie & Son.
- Ross, Alexander (1849). Adventures of the first settlers on the Oregon or Columbia River: being a narrative of the expedition fitted out by John Jacob Astor, to establish the "Pacific Fur Company"; with an account of some Indian tribes on the coast of the Pacific. Smith, Elder and Co.
- Ross, Alexander (1855). The Fur Hunters of the Far West, vol. 1. Smith, Elder and Co
- Joint Indian Reserve Commission (1877). Online at Union of BC Indian Chiefs Digital Archive.
- Journal of Proceedings of the Commission for the Settlement of the Indian Reserves in the Province of British Columbia, 1877, NAC, RG 10, vol. 1284 (reel C-13902), Mikan no. 157582.
- Ninety-Seven Pages Census Report of The Shuswap And Okanagan Tribes by Alexander Anderson of The British Columbia Reserve Commission, 1878, NAC, RG 10, vol. 3659 (reel C-10115), Mikan no. 2061517.
- Dawson, George M. (1891). Notes on the Shuswap People of British Columbia
- Teit, James (1900). "The Thompson Indians of British Columbia" in Memoirs of the American Museum of Natural History: Publications of Jesup North Pacific Expedition; Vol. I, Pt. IV
- Smith, Harlan I. (1900). "Archaeology of the Thompson River Region" in Memoirs of the American Museum of Natural History: Publications of Jesup North Pacific Expedition; Vol. I, Pt. VI
- Teit, James (1909). "The Shuswap" in Memoirs of the American Museum of Natural History: Publications of Jesup North Pacific Expedition; Vol. II, Pt. VII
- Teit, James (1912). "The Mythology of the Thompson Indians" in Memoirs of the American Museum of Natural History: Publications of Jesup North Pacific Expedition; Vol. VIII, Pt. II
- Laurier Memorial, August 25, 1910.
- Memorial to Frank Oliver, Minister of the Interior, May 10, 1911.
  - Signed by chiefs from the Secwepemc, T’silqot’in, St’lat’limc, Okanagan, Carrier, Thompson (N’lkapmc), Tahltan and Sto:lo Nations including Chief André of the North Thompson.
- McKenna–McBride Royal Commission (1916). Online at Union of BC Indian Chiefs Digital Archive

== Notes ==
1.The notes published in this book were based on observations made by George Mercer Dawson in the years 1877, 1888, 1889, and 1890.
