= McLure fire =

2003 wildfire in North Thompson Valley, Canada

2003 McLure wildfire
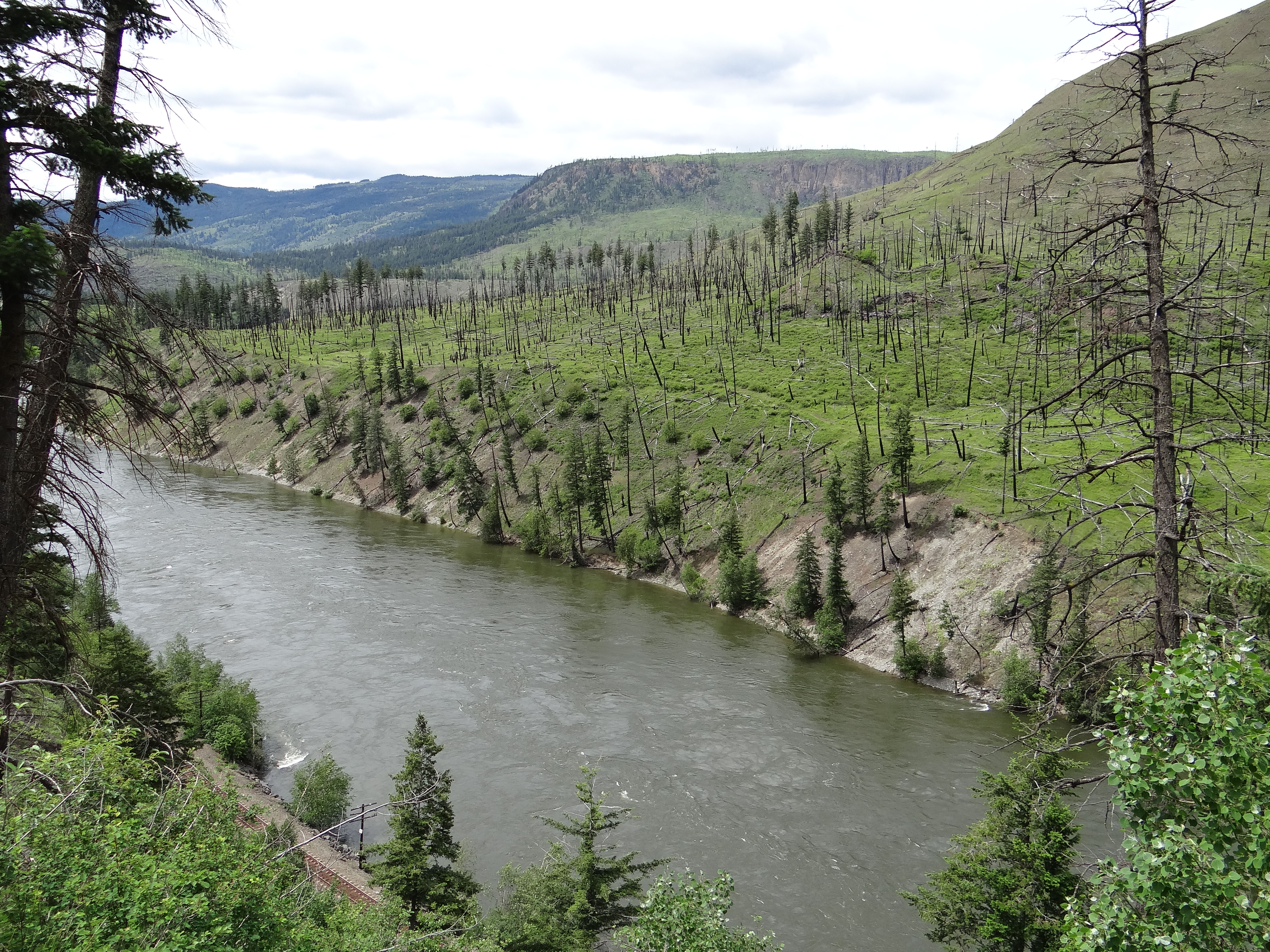
- Burned area near Barriere ten years after the McLure fire
- Date: July 30, 2003
- Location: North Thompson Valley, British Columbia

Statistics
- Burned area: 26,420 hectares (65,300 acres)
- Land use: Parkland, Rural, Farmland

Impacts
- Structures lost: 81

Ignition
- Cause: Cigarette

The McLure fire was a 2003 wildfire in the Canadian province of British Columbia. The fire resulted in the loss of 72 houses, 9 businesses, and 180 jobs in the North Thompson Valley. The fire cost $31.1 million CAD to extinguish and caused an additional $8.2 million CAD in property damage. The final size of the fire was 26,420 hectares (65,300 acres).

== Background ==
The southern Interior region of British Columbia saw major drought conditions leading into the fire season of 2003. According to Environment Canada, the province was experiencing its driest three-year period on record at the time, and the southern Interior was seeing the worst drought in 100 years. The year would become one of the most intense fire seasons at the time; over 2500 fires burned over 265,000 hectares (650,000 acres) during the summer. The Okanagan Mountain Park wildfire would destroy more structures than ever before in the province. Firefighting resources were spread thin; one day saw 218 new starts in B.C. Over 30,000 people were subject to evacuation orders because of the fires.

== Ignition and spread ==
The fire started on July 30th in the community of McLure on the North Thompson River. It was sparked by a cigarette butt dropped by a local resident. The fire saw very rapid initial growth despite both air and ground resources being deployed to the fire within 22 minutes of it being reported. The fire grew from 0.5 hectares (1.2 acres) to approximately 10 hectares (25 acres) in two hours as it moved up the steep valley hillsides east of McLure. By the end of the first day, the fire was 195 hectares (480 acres).

July 31st saw more rapid fire growth, with the fire jumping over to the western banks of the North Thompson River. The third day of the fire saw the highest fire activity, and the most loss of structures, as it entered the edge of the town of Barriere and caused heavy damage to the small community of Louis Creek. The perimeter now also extended westward and northward into the Bonaparte Plateau. Fire activity declined in the next week and most evacuation orders were lifted by August 8th. The fire was not considered contained until August 31. Its final size was measured at 26,420 hectares (65,300 acres).

== Impacts ==
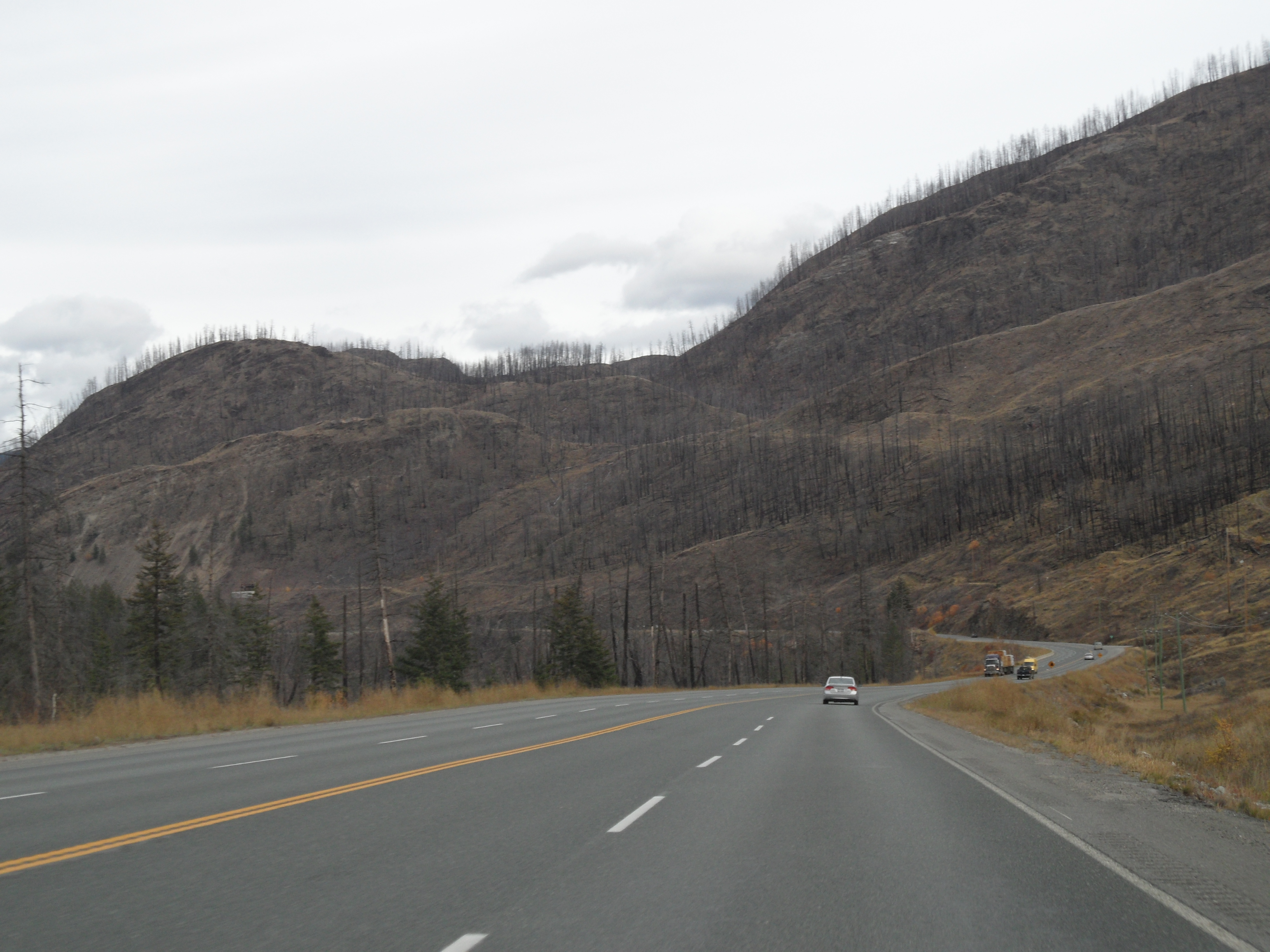
Damage from the wildfire on British Columbia Highway 5 south of Barriere

72 structures and nine businesses were damaged or destroyed by the McLure fire, mostly in the Louis Creek, McLure, and Barriere communities. The local sawmill, operated by Tolko Industries, was destroyed and was not rebuilt, resulting in the loss of employment for more than 180 people. The cost was estimated at 31.1 million Canadian dollars (CAD) in 2003; a further 8.2 million CAD was set as the cost of damages to property.

The fire damaged over 20 kilometres (12 mi) of BC Hydro electrical transmission lines, resulting in blackouts for residents and businesses north of the fire. 7800 people in the North Thompson and Robson Valleys were without power for six days, and had intermittent power for three weeks after the fire. Barriere mayor Mike Fennel pointed to the fire as a major factor in the successful local vote to incorporate the community in 2007.

=== Criminal charges and litigation ===
The McLure resident who dropped the lit cigarette that started the fire was charged by the Province under the Forest Practices Code for "dropping a burning substance within one kilometre of a forest". Possible sentences could have included up to a one million Canadian dollar fine and three years in prison. On November of 2005, the person was found guilty and fined 3000 CAD. The sentence was influenced by a local petition by 1400 residents arguing for forgiveness, pointing out that the fire start was accidental.

Tolko Industries, the owners of the destroyed sawmill, sued the Province for an undisclosed value. The company clarified that it was acting on behalf of its insurers in filing the suit. The suit claimed that the provincial fire service had failed on several fronts, including prevention, response, and assessment of the fire. The lawsuit originally also claimed damages from the resident convicted of starting the fire; by 2013 they had chosen not to pursue damages from the individual.

=== Monument ===
A public sculpture, entitled the "Wildfire Dragon Monument" was constructed in Louis Creek by a non-profit society of local residents affected by the fires. In 2023, the monument was relocated to Fadear Park in Barriere after the original location was re-purposed for industrial development.
