= Raft Mountain =

Mountain in British Columbia, Canada

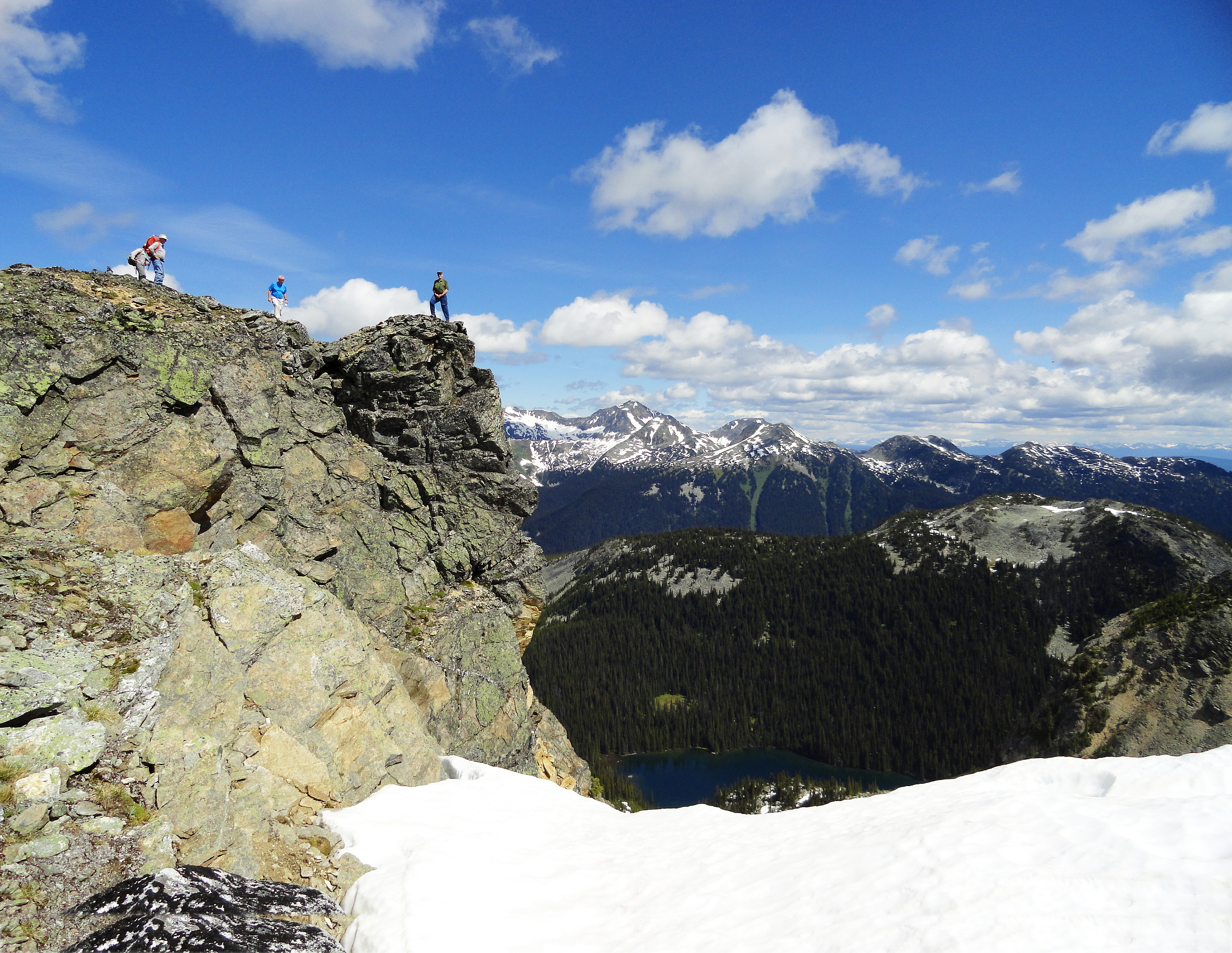
- West ridge of Raft Mountain with Trophy Mountain in distance

Highest point
- Elevation: 2,450 m (8,038 ft)
- Prominence: 585 m (1,919 ft)
- Coordinates: 51°43′40″N 119°51′40″W

Geography
- Location within British Columbia
- Interactive map of Raft Mountain
- Location: British Columbia, Canada
- District: Kamloops Division Yale Land District
- Parent range: Shuswap Highland
- Topo map: NTS 82M12 Vavenby

Geology
- Mountain type: Pyramidal peak

Climbing
- Easiest route: Via south slopes and West Ridge

Raft Mountain is a mountain in east-central British Columbia, Canada, located north-east of Clearwater and just outside the south boundary of Wells Gray Provincial Park. The Clearwater River flows to the west, Raft River to the east, Spahats Creek to the north, and North Thompson River to the south. Raft Mountain is part of the Shuswap Highland. There are five summits in the group and the highest is 2,450 m (8,038 ft). Trophy Mountain is the closest summit to the north.

== Access ==
The Raft West and Raft Peak Forest Service Roads provide access to the south side of the mountain. Check in advance for logging activity. Some sections of this road require four-wheel drive and a high clearance vehicle. It is nearly 22 km (13.7 mi) to the end of the road at 1,865 m (6,119 ft). A hike of about 2.5 hours goes up the meadows to the west ridge, then to the summit. An all-day hike crosses the five summits.

The north face of Raft Mountain can be reached via Spahats Creek Road which turns east off Clearwater Valley Road (also called Wells Gray Park Road). A good clearance vehicle is recommended, but four-wheel drive should not be necessary. After 13.8 km (8.6 mi), watch for the sign "Cirque of Tarns Trail" at the pass. The trail was rebuilt in 2023 and several sections of boardwalk were added by BC Parks. The 2.3 km long trail bypasses Caligata Lake and ends below the Raft Mountain cliffs. Cross-country hiking routes lead from there to the nearby Cirque of Tarns. A more rigorous hike ascends to the east ridge of Raft Mountain from where a skyline walk can go in either direction to Raft's multiple summits.

Road and hiking directions for both routes are essential and can be found in Exploring Wells Gray Park (7th edition).

Groomed cross-country ski trails are located on the lower slopes of Raft Mountain and are maintained by the Wells Gray Outdoors Club.

A network of snowmobile trails on Raft Mountain is maintained by the Clearwater Sno-Drifters Club. The group also operates two warming huts near treeline.

== Naming ==
The Overlanders expedition to the Cariboo goldfields rafted down the North Thompson River in 1862. When they arrived at the mouth of the Clearwater River, they noticed this prominent peak and named it for their rafts. They also named the Clearwater River for its distinct clarity compared to the muddy North Thompson and the nearby Raft River.

== Gallery ==
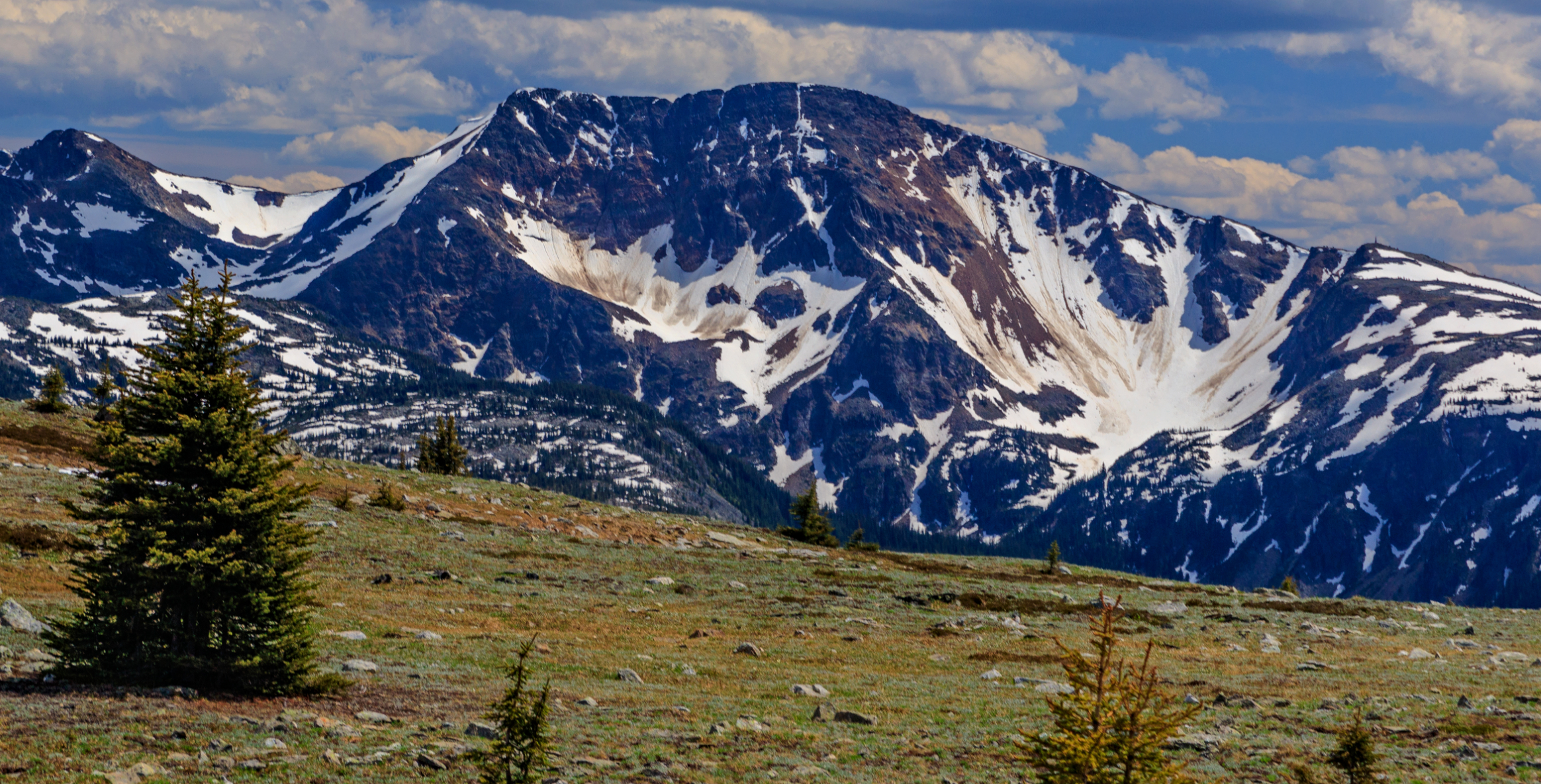
Raft Mountain from Trophy Meadows

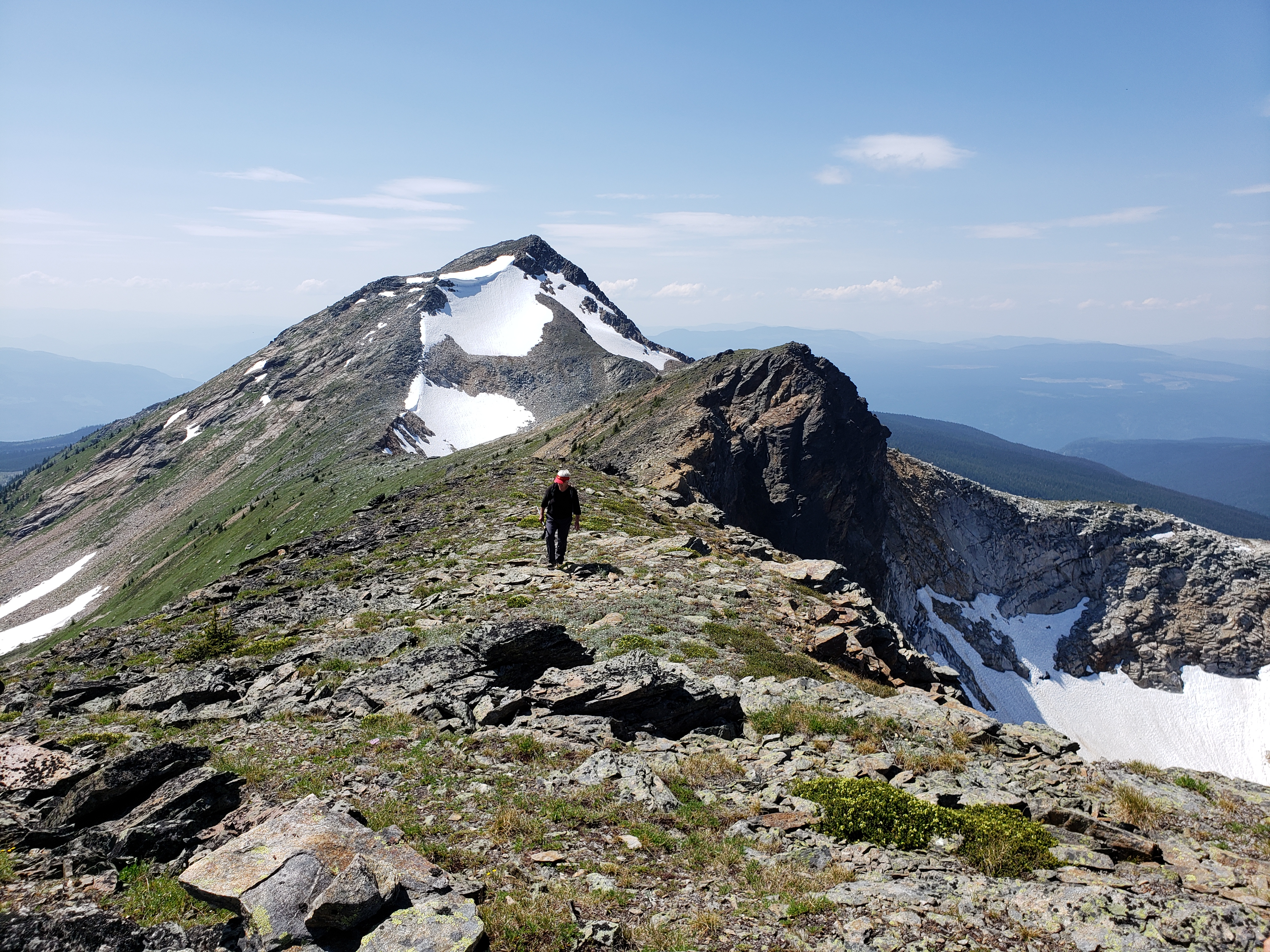
Raft Mountain summits 2 and 3, seen from summit 4
