= Caligata Lake Provincial Park =

Provincial park in British Columbia

- IUCN category II (national park)
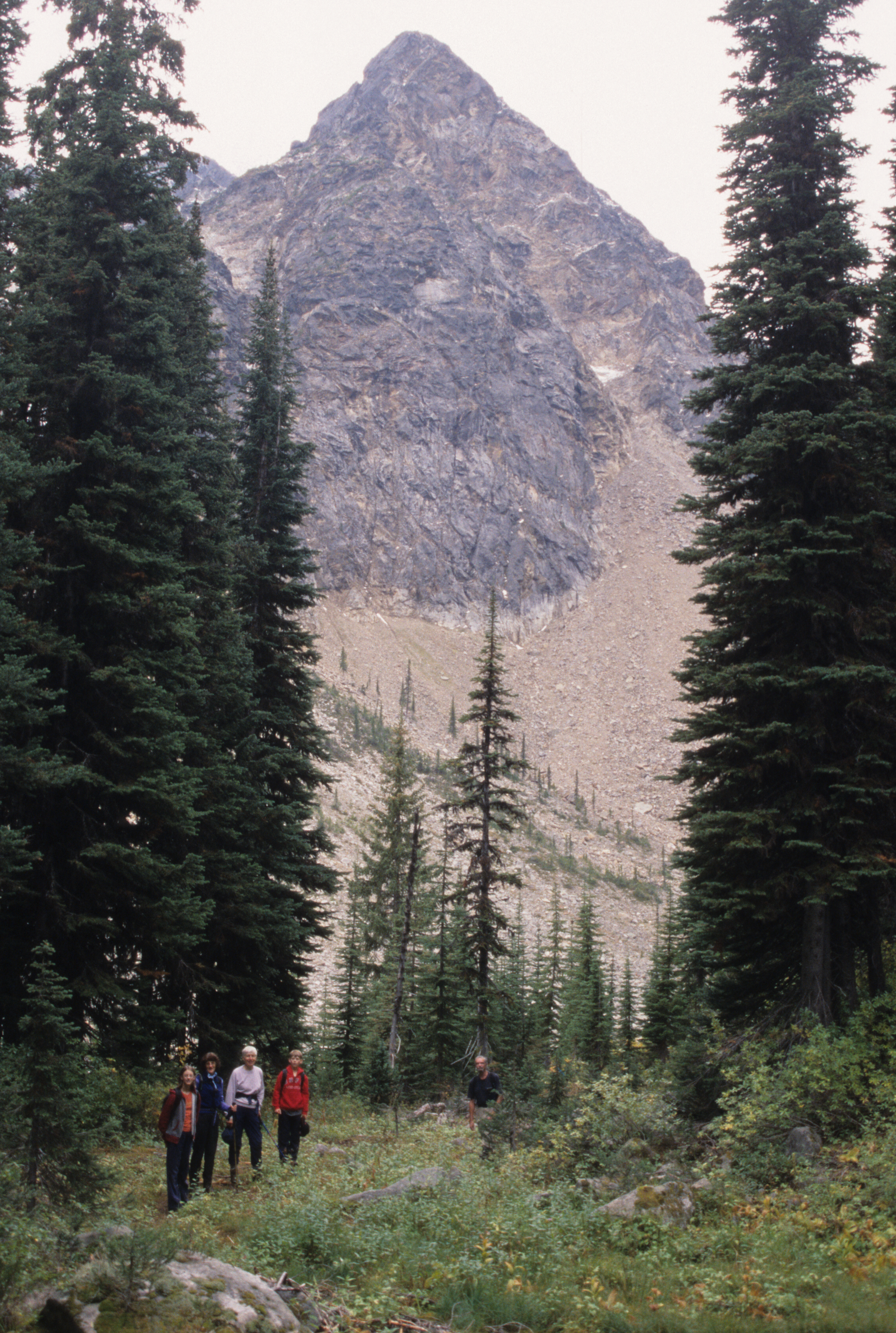
- North Face of Raft Mountain near Caligata Lake

- Location within British Columbia
- Interactive map of Caligata Lake Provincial Park
- Location: British Columbia, Canada
- Nearest city: Clearwater
- Coordinates: 51°44′27″N 119°50′12″W
- Area: 153 ha (380 acres)
- Established: 1996
- Visitors: less than 100 (in 2022)
- Governing body: BC Parks

Caligata Lake Provincial Park is a provincial park in British Columbia, Canada, located northeast of Clearwater. The lake occupies a cirque below the north face of Raft Mountain. The park has no visitor facilities or services.

Access is by Spahats Creek Road off the Clearwater Valley Road (also called Wells Gray Park Road) to km 13.8. The trail was rebuilt in 2023 and several sections of boardwalk were added by BC Parks. The 2.3 km long trail bypasses Caligata Lake and ends below the Raft Mountain cliffs. Cross-country hiking routes lead from there to the nearby Cirque of Tarns. A more rigorous hike ascends to the east ridge of Raft Mountain from where a skyline walk can go in either direction to Raft's multiple summits.

The name comes from the Latin for the hoary marmot, marmota caligata.

== See also ==
- Wells Gray Provincial Park
- Trophy Mountain
- Spahats Falls
