= Barriere, British Columbia =

Barriere
- District municipality
- District of Barriere
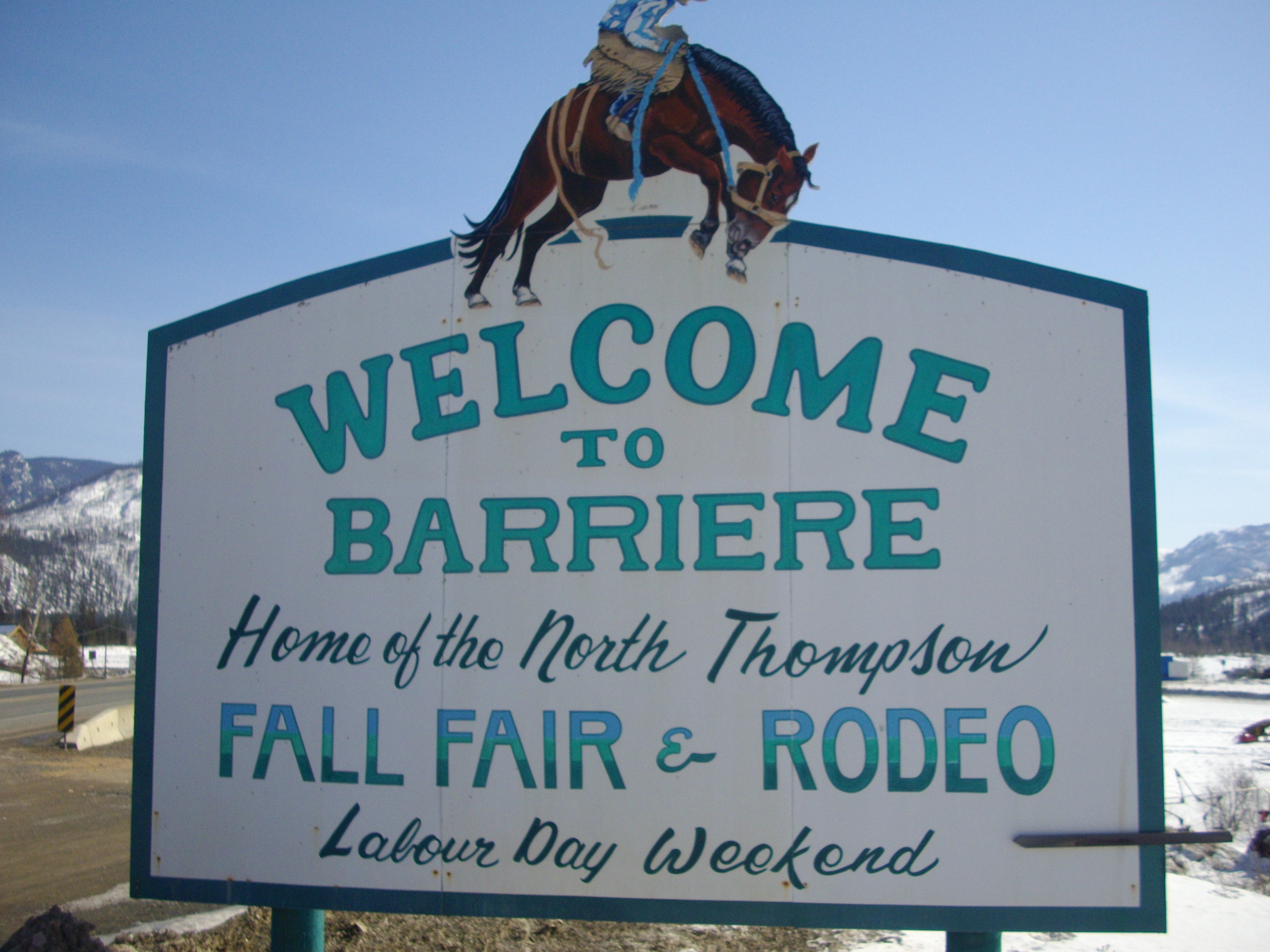

- Location of Barriere in British Columbia Barriere (Canada)
- Coordinates: 51°10′47″N 120°07′25″W
- Country: Canada
- Province: British Columbia
- Regional district: Thompson-Nicola
- Incorporated: December 2007

Government
  - MP: Frank Caputo (Conservative)
  - MLA: Ward Stamer (BC Conservative)

Area
  - Land: 10.77 km^{2} (4.16 sq mi)

Population (2016)
  - Total: 1,713
  - Density: 164.7/km^{2} (427/sq mi)
- Time zone: UTC−07:00 (PT)
- Area code: 250 / 778 / 236
- Highways: Highway 5
- Website: districtofbarriere.com

Barriere (/bəˈrɪər/ bə-REER) is a district municipality in central British Columbia, Canada, located 66 km (41 mi) north of the larger city of Kamloops on Highway 5. It is situated at the confluence of the Barrière River (St́yelltsecwétkwe in Secwepemctsín) and North Thompson Rivers in the Central North Thompson Valley.

== History ==
The area has been occupied since time immemorial by the Simpcw who are members of the Secwepemc.

The origin of the name 'Barriere' (originally and alternately, Barrière) is uncertain but dates back to at least 1828. There are two main theories: the name arose either as a description of indigenous fishing techniques or as a description of the difficulty with which the river was crossed by early French-speaking fur traders. George Mercer Dawson noted in an 1877–78 geological survey report that, "[t]he [Barrière River] as its name imports, is sometimes crossed with difficulty in the spring." Difficulty in crossing was also noted by early Hudson's Bay Company traders. Notes at the Kamloops Museum suggest that it was named in 1828 when Archibald McDonald created an early map describing the rocks at the mouth of the river which impeded navigation. A place names file in the Provincial Archives of BC compiled in the 1940s by AG Harvey from various sources notes that it could be as a description of the indigenous fish traps. One such barrier observed in the Barrière River was described by Dawson as "two weirs or fences each of which stretched completely across the stream." Samuel Black's map of 1835 shows the Barrière River, as well as showing lines across other rivers near Clearwater that are marked as 'barrière'.

The present community dates its beginning from 1914 with the establishment of the post office and railway station. The presence of the grave accent has alternated over the years. In 1915 it was recorded as 'Barriere'. In 1955, it was changed to 'Barrière'. When it was incorporated as a District Municipality in 2007 it was spelled as 'Barriere' in the enabling Letters Patent. Various other locations in the area retain the grave accent including the Barrière River, East Barrière River, Barrière Mountain, East Barrière Lake, North Barrière Lake, South Barrière Lake, and Upper South Barrière Lake.

The people of the Simpcw First Nation, still reside in present-day Chu Chua, just north of Barriere. George Mercer Dawson noted a location of an important old indigenous village site at the mouth of the Barrière River based on observations in 1877, 1888, 1889 and 1890. Dawson also noted that the west branch of the Barrière River was named "Sas'-kum or 'open mouth,' from a story which relates that a dog was there turned to stone, and may still be seen somewhere with mouth open."

Gold was discovered in the area as early as 1861, and was mined using the placer method. The August 12, 1861 edition of the British Colonist mentions "...one party of Frenchmen at a place above Kamloops called Barrier (sic). They are fluming the Thompson, and expect to take out $25 per day to the hand, it is also incorpurated (sic)."

Depending upon where one resided, $25 could purchase an acre of land, a saddle, or double-barreled shotgun. To give some sense of proportion to these figures: comparing $25 of daily gold production per hired hand to the price of a barrel of crude oil in 1861 ($0.49), the gold production would be the equivalent of more than 50 barrels (7.9 m^{3}) of oil per hand per day.

The gold rush also brought smallpox to the Simpcw population, reducing their numbers significantly.

=== 2003 fire ===
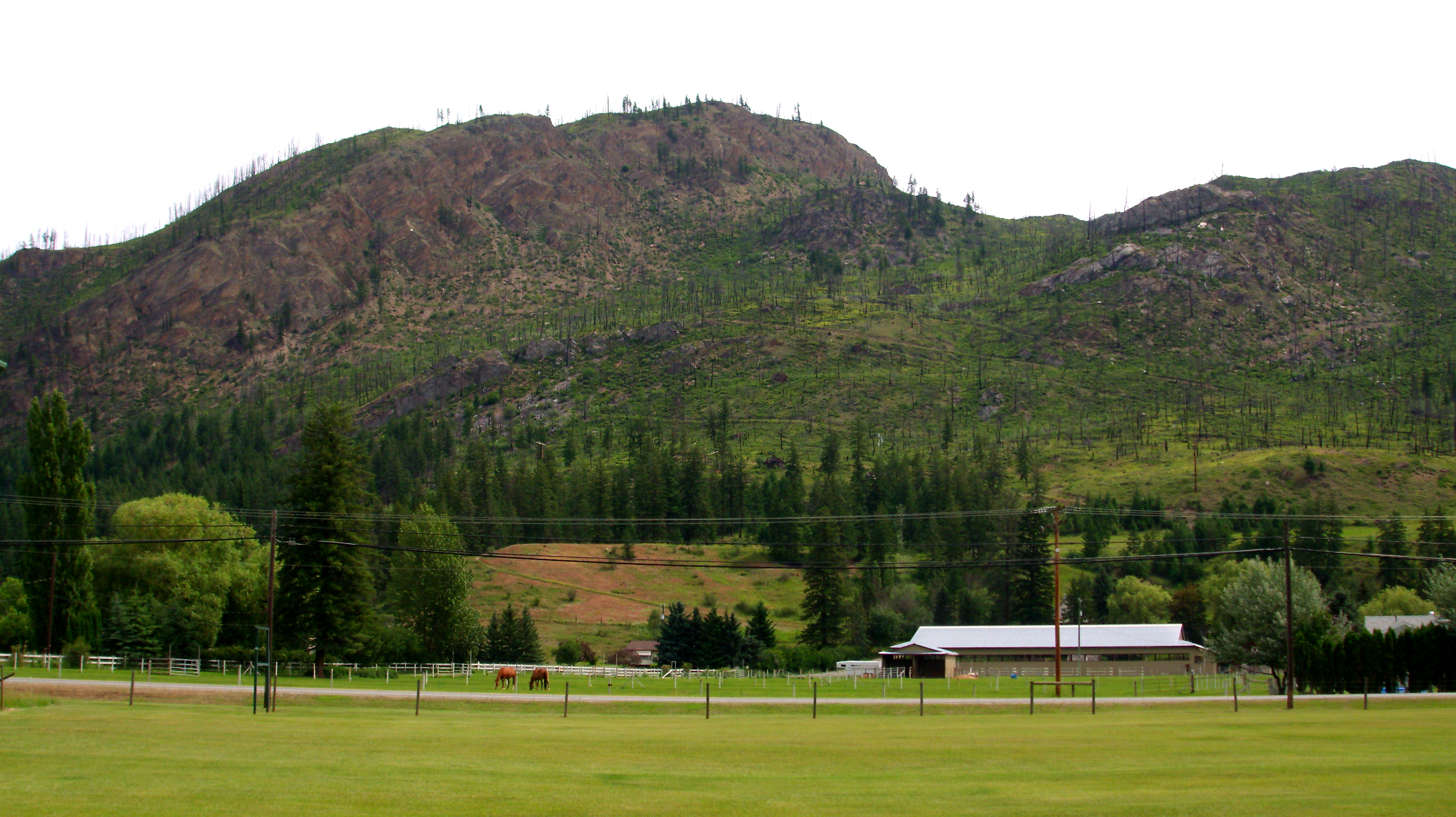
View from the Barriere townsite in 2012

In 2003, a major forest fire, McLure Forest Fire, swept through the area surrounding Barriere and destroyed 72 homes and 9 businesses, most notably the Louis Creek sawmill, a large local employer. On Wednesday, July 30, 2003, the careless discarding of a cigarette butt by a McLure resident into dry pine needles and withered grass, began a nightmare for those who lived in the North Thompson Valley. The McLure fire was reported to the BC Forest Service at 1:02 p.m. Crews and airtankers were dispatched within 22 minutes. Resources on the fire by July 31 were; 100 firefighters (with 45 persons working the fire overnight), four helicopters, nine bulldozers, two excavators, and five water trucks with the McLure and Barriere Fire Departments. The fire burned the mountain above Barriere called Armor Mountain, in the Louis Creek zone. It also burned across the North Thompson river from Barriere, to Bonaparte Lake. Due to this fire, 3,800 people were evacuated, 880 of these people were also evacuated for a second time, from the small communities of McLure, Exlou, Barriere and Louis Creek. The evacuation order was lifted on August 8, although the fire was not officially declared contained until August 31. The fire reached a final size of 26,420 hectares.

On July 26, 2008 a wildfire dragon monument was erected in Louis Creek to commemorate the determination and compassion of those who fought the flames and those who aided in the rebuilding of the community. The fire cost $31.1 million CAD to extinguish and caused another $8.2 million CAD in property damage.

== Climate ==
Barriere has a humid continental climate (Köppen climate classification Dfb) with cold winters and warm summers. Winters are cold and snowy with a January average of −6.5 °C (20 °F) and an average annual snowfall of 121 cm (48 in). Summers are warm and dry with a July high of 27.9 °C (82.2 °F) although temperatures above 30 °C (86 °F) occur 27 days in a year. The climate is dry, with an average annual precipitation of 486 mm (19 in).

Climate data for Barriere
Month	Jan	Feb	Mar	Apr	May	Jun	Jul	Aug	Sep	Oct	Nov	Dec	Year
Record high °C (°F)	14.0 (57.2)	15.5 (59.9)	24.0 (75.2)	32.2 (90.0)	38.0 (100.4)	39.4 (102.9)	41.1 (106.0)	38.9 (102.0)	34.5 (94.1)	27.5 (81.5)	21.7 (71.1)	12.2 (54.0)	41.1 (106.0)
Mean daily maximum °C (°F)	−1.7 (28.9)	2.4 (36.3)	10.5 (50.9)	15.9 (60.6)	21.0 (69.8)	24.6 (76.3)	27.8 (82.0)	27.0 (80.6)	21.7 (71.1)	12.2 (54.0)	3.2 (37.8)	−2.0 (28.4)	13.6 (56.5)
Daily mean °C (°F)	−5.2 (22.6)	−2.4 (27.7)	3.6 (38.5)	8.2 (46.8)	13.0 (55.4)	16.7 (62.1)	19.2 (66.6)	18.4 (65.1)	13.3 (55.9)	6.4 (43.5)	−0.2 (31.6)	−5.1 (22.8)	7.2 (45.0)
Mean daily minimum °C (°F)	−8.7 (16.3)	−7.1 (19.2)	−3.4 (25.9)	0.5 (32.9)	4.9 (40.8)	8.8 (47.8)	10.4 (50.7)	9.7 (49.5)	4.9 (40.8)	0.6 (33.1)	−3.5 (25.7)	−8.1 (17.4)	0.8 (33.4)
Record low °C (°F)	−42.8 (−45.0)	−34.4 (−29.9)	−29.4 (−20.9)	−11.7 (10.9)	−4.4 (24.1)	−1.1 (30.0)	0.6 (33.1)	−2.2 (28.0)	−7.0 (19.4)	−20.0 (−4.0)	−33.0 (−27.4)	−39.4 (−38.9)	−42.8 (−45.0)
Average precipitation mm (inches)	41.0 (1.61)	26.7 (1.05)	26.4 (1.04)	32.3 (1.27)	44.8 (1.76)	56.8 (2.24)	50.9 (2.00)	50.7 (2.00)	35.8 (1.41)	39.3 (1.55)	53.8 (2.12)	48.4 (1.91)	506.9 (19.96)
Average rainfall mm (inches)	13.2 (0.52)	12.7 (0.50)	22.0 (0.87)	31.6 (1.24)	44.7 (1.76)	56.8 (2.24)	50.9 (2.00)	50.7 (2.00)	35.8 (1.41)	37.8 (1.49)	33.4 (1.31)	11.9 (0.47)	401.4 (15.80)
Average snowfall cm (inches)	27.8 (10.9)	14.1 (5.6)	4.4 (1.7)	0.7 (0.3)	0.1 (0.0)	0.0 (0.0)	0.0 (0.0)	0.0 (0.0)	0.0 (0.0)	1.4 (0.6)	20.4 (8.0)	36.5 (14.4)	105.5 (41.5)
Average precipitation days (≥ 0.2 mm)	13.5	10.7	10.9	12.1	13.7	13.4	12.0	11.7	9.0	12.6	16.4	13.6	149.4
Average rainy days (≥ 0.2 mm)	5.8	5.9	9.4	11.9	13.7	13.4	12.0	11.7	9.0	12.4	10.7	4.1	120.0
Average snowy days (≥ 0.2 cm)	9.8	5.6	2.0	0.6	0.1	0.0	0.0	0.0	0.0	0.8	7.5	10.8	37.2

== Demographics ==
In the 2021 Census of Population conducted by Statistics Canada, Barriere had a population of 1,765 living in 760 of its 848 total private dwellings, a change of 3% from its 2016 population of 1,713. With a land area of 10.73 km^{2} (4.14 sq mi), it had a population density of 164.5/km^{2} (426.0/sq mi) in 2021.

=== Religion ===
According to the 2021 census, religious groups in Barriere included:

- Irreligion (1,045 persons or 63.1%)
- Christianity (540 persons or 32.6%)
- Buddhism (35 persons or 2.1%)
- Other (45 persons or 2.7%)

== Infrastructure ==
The community voted to become an incorporated municipality in November 2007. Winning the election for the first mayor was Mr. Mike Fennell, a member of one of the founding families of the community.

The closest hospital in the region is the Royal Inland Hospital located to the south in Kamloops and to the north in Clearwater, British Columbia. One of the main reasons for the growing community's existence is its location on the Yellowhead Highway #5, which offers the only viable route in the interior to northern British Columbia, Jasper, and Edmonton. A Canadian National Railway line passes through the town as well.

== Industry ==
Barriere is primarily driven by the forest industry, however the other industries which serve the town are tourism and agriculture. Mining development is on the increase in the North Thompson Valley, and it is predicted that many forestry workers will migrate from forestry to mining as these new developments begin production. There are two industrial parks in the community. One is located in nearby Louis Creek and is the former site of the Tolko Mill, which was destroyed by a fire in 2003. Barriere is just south of the newly discovered Harper Creek Copper deposit, considered to be the 8th largest in the world.

The primary employers in the town are Gilbert Smith Forest Products, with 75% of the town's residents being linked to forestry. Many residents who live in Barriere commute to work in Kamloops, 45 minutes to the south.

Currently there is a community effort to promote the development of a TV, film and new media technology industry in the area.

== Community Services ==
Barriere has many different community services to offer including

=== Health Services ===
- Barriere Community Health Centre

=== Emergency Services ===
- Barriere Search & Rescue
- Barriere Fire Rescue
- Chu Chua Volunteer Fire Department
- RCMP
- BC Ambulance

== Schools ==
Barriere has two public school, which are located in School District 73.

- Barriere Elementary School (Kindergarten- Grade 6)
- Barriere Secondary School (Grade 7- Grade12)

Barriere once had a third school, the Barriere Ridge Elementary School, that was used for grades kindergarten to grade 3. The Ridge building is now home to the District of Barriere offices as well as Little Stars Daycare. In 1967, the Secondary school was burnt down just before final exams and a new one was built. The graduating class of 1968 had to be bused to Kamloops Senior Secondary School while the new school was built.

Simpcw First Nation also has an elementary school, Neqweyqwelsten, that has been in operation since 1983. Neqweyqwelsten School is open to all Simpcw First Nation and community members and families. If space permits, non-members may apply to attend the school.

== Recreation ==
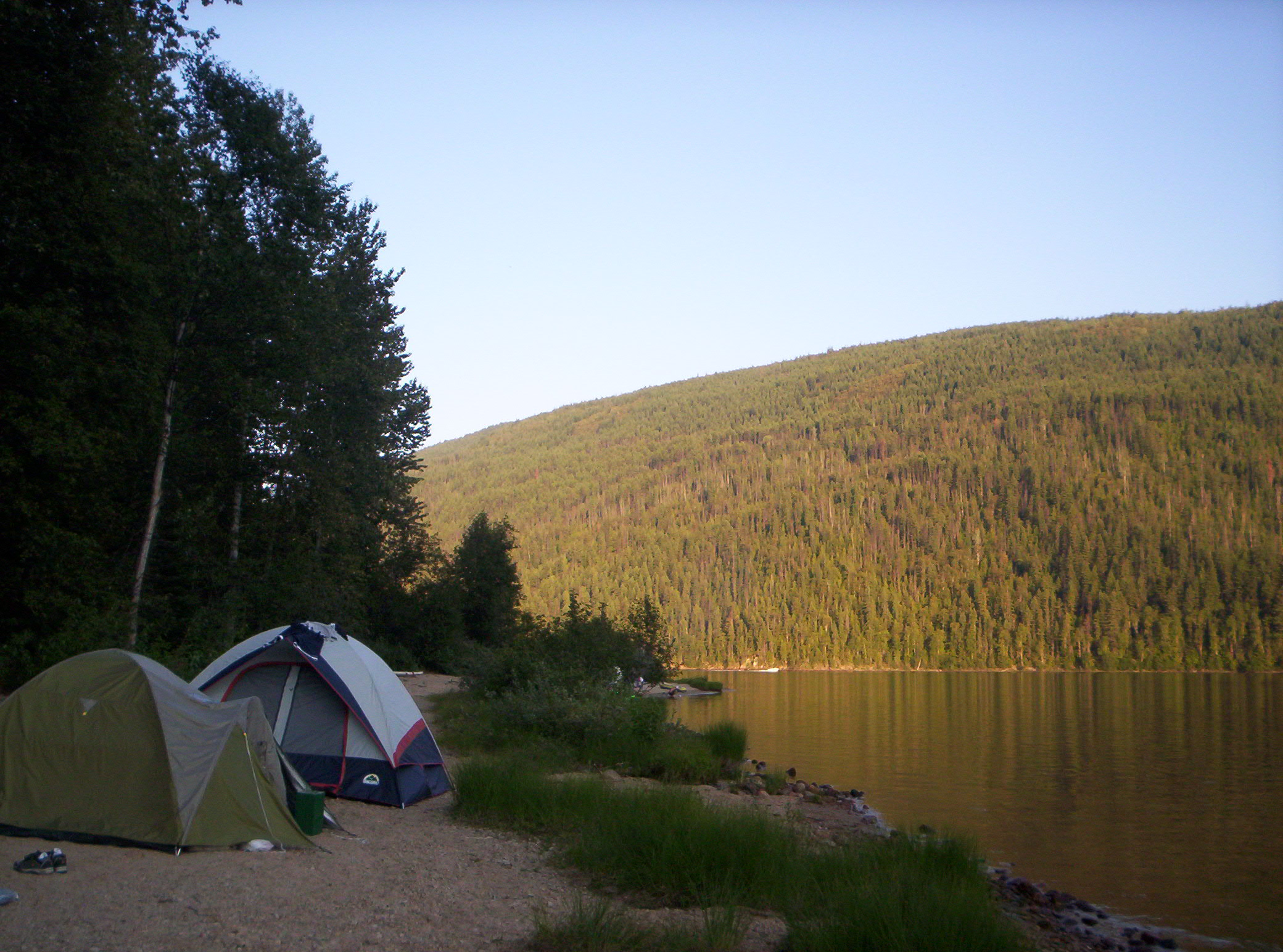
Camping is available at Barriere Lake

Barriere is surrounded by areas for hiking, fishing, hunting, camping and more

- Chinook Cove Golf Course- A beautiful 9 hole golf course with a restaurant and onsite full hookup camping sites
- Barriere is surrounded by beautiful lakes including East Barriere Lake, North Barriere Lake, Johnson Lake, Adams Lake and many more
- Sun Peaks Ski Resort is located 1 hour SE of Barriere
- Fadear Park is located in the center of Barriere. The park contains a bandshell, picnic tables, playground, outdoor workout equipment and a paves walking track
- Barriere has four baseball diamonds that are frequently used for both softball and slowpitch
- Community halls include the Fall Fair Hall and Lions Club Hall. Other larger facilities include the curling rink and seniors centre.
- Barriere hosts a branch of the veteran's service group: The Royal Canadian Legion.
- Cadets: Since at least the 1950s, the 2924 Rocky Mountain Rangers army cadet corps paraded at the Royal Canadian Legion building on Shaver road. Sadly, the unit number 2924 was transferred to a new cadet corps in the Cowichan Valley. Locals wishing to attend cadets may be able to share a ride with others who regularly travel to attend the Kamloops Rocky Mountain Rangers.
- Barriere has a local community theatre group: Thompson Valley Players Society
- Barriere is home to the North Thompson Museum, which showcases the lives and history of the people in the North Thompson Valley
- Barriere is home to the North Thompson Fall Fair and Rodeo, which occurs every Labour Day weekend. The fair celebrated its 70th anniversary in 2019. It is the community's biggest yearly event produced by hundreds of volunteers. About 10,000 people attend annually, over the three-day fair.
- Barriere & the North Thompson Fall Fair have the 3rd oldest Royalty Pageant program in British Columbia.

== Religion ==
There are six houses of worship within the town.

- The Church of St Paul - a worshipping community of Anglicans, Uniteds and Lutherans
- Bethany Baptist Church - affiliated with the Fellowship of Evangelical Baptist Churches'. Located on the corner of Barriere Town Road, and Dixon Cr. Road, Barriere, BC.
- Christian Life Assembly - Member of Pentecostal Assemblies of Canada
- St. George's Roman Catholic Church
- Kingdom Hall of Jehovah's Witnesses
- Barriere Open Door Fellowship
