= Avola (disambiguation) =

Avola is a city and comune in the province of Syracuse, Sicily.

Avola may also refer to:

- Ribolla Gialla, also known as Avola, an Italian/Slovenian wine grape
- Avola, British Columbia, an unincorporated community in the Canadian province of British Columbia
- Giorgio Avola (born 1989), Italian fencer
- Nero d'Avola, a red wine grape in Sicily
