= Louis Creek =

- Location of Louis Creek in British Columbia
- Coordinates: 51°08′00″N 120°07′00″W
- Country: Canada
- Province: British Columbia
- Area codes: 250, 778

Louis Creek, an unincorporated settlement in the Interior of British Columbia, Canada, located at the mouth of Louis Creek on the North Thompson River was named after Louis Barrie and François Lavieur who prospected there in 1861, finding some gold, so that the stream became known as Frenchman's Creek. It would appear that the name of Louis Creek was named in honor of Louis (Clexlixqen) also known by "Little Louis or Petit Louis" who was Chief of the Shuswap First Nations People in the Kamloops Region from as early as 1852. Louis Creek Indian Reserve No. 4 is located nearby.

There are two parts of Louis Creek, one running along Highway 5 and the other part is named the "Upper Louis Creek" which extends from Highway 5 and up into a separate valley that is near the present day site of Sun Peaks. Eileen Lake is the headwaters of Louis Creek. The creek is 64 kilometers in length. The community of Louis Creek suffered heavy damage from a forest fire in 2003. The tragedy struck the community of McLure and devastated Louis Creek. The nearest community of Barriere was mostly spared, touching only the outskirts of the community.
