= Raft River (British Columbia) =

Location
- Country: Canada
- Province: British Columbia
- Land District: Kamloops Division Yale

Physical characteristics
- Source: Columbia Mountains
- Mouth: North Thompson River
  - location: east of Clearwater, Thompson Country
  - coordinates: 51°37′55″N 119°59′32″W
  - elevation: 400 m (1,300 ft)
- Length: 78 km (48 mi)
- Basin size: 764 km^{2} (295 sq mi)
- Discharge
  - location: mouth
  - average: 15.2 m^{3}/s (540 cu ft/s)
  - minimum: 0.283 m^{3}/s (10.0 cu ft/s)
  - maximum: 142 m^{3}/s (5,000 cu ft/s)

Basin features
- Tributaries
  - right: West Raft River

The Raft River is a tributary of the North Thompson River, one of the main tributaries of the Fraser River, in the Canadian province of British Columbia. It flows through the Shuswap Highland region southeast of Wells Gray Provincial Park. Most of the Raft River's watershed lies outside the boundaries of Wells Gray, except for some of the headwaters of the West Raft River tributary.

== Course ==
The Raft River originates in the Columbia Mountains between Wells Gray Provincial Park and the North Thompson River, south of the Blue River and southwest of the town of Blue River. It flows generally south through the Shuswap Highland to join the North Thompson River just east of Clearwater.

As the Raft River flows south it is joined by tributaries such as Richie Creek, Stratton Creek, Maxwell Creek, West Raft River, Blowhole Creek, Moilliet Creek, McCorvie Creek, and Willis Creek.

== See also ==
- List of rivers of British Columbia
- List of tributaries of the Fraser River
