= Barrière River (North Thompson River tributary) =

River in British Columbia, Canada

Barrière River Barriere River
- Location within British Columbia Location within Canada
- Etymology: French for "barrier"

Location
- Country: Canada
- Province: British Columbia
- Land District: Kamloops Division Yale

Physical characteristics
- Source: Shuswap Highland
  - coordinates: 51°31′N 119°42′W
  - elevation: 1,568 m (5,144 ft)
- Mouth: North Thompson River
  - location: Barriere, Thompson Country
  - coordinates: 51°10′26″N 120°8′19″W
  - elevation: 365 m (1,198 ft)
- Basin size: 1,140 km^{2} (440 sq mi)
- Discharge
  - location: mouth
  - average: 14.5 m^{3}/s (510 cu ft/s)
  - minimum: 0.566 m^{3}/s (20.0 cu ft/s)
  - maximum: 171 m^{3}/s (6,000 cu ft/s)

Basin features
- Tributaries
  - left: East Barrière River

Barrière River (also spelled Barriere River) is a tributary of the North Thompson River, one of the main tributaries of the Fraser River, in the Canadian province of British Columbia. It flows through the Shuswap Highland region north of Kamloops. Its name in Secwepemctsín is St́yelltsecwétkwe.

== Name origin ==
In 1828 Hudson's Bay Company fur trader Archibald McDonald named the mouth of the river Barrière because rocks there were an impediment to navigation. Another possibility is that the name relates to fish traps placed across the river by the Secwepemc people.

== Course ==
The Barrière River originates near Vavenby Mountain in the Shuswap Highland, south of Vavenby. It flows south into Saskum Lake, then continues south for some distance. It turns west and is joined by Fennell Creek. Bear Creek joins from the north just before the Barrière River empties into North Barrière Lake. Vermelin Creek and Harper Creek empty into the lake from the north. The Barrière River flows from the west end of the lake, turning south as numerous tributaries join, such as Birk Creek, Mack Creek, Slate Creek, and Sprague Creek.

The East Barrière River then joins from the east and the Barrière River turns to flow west. The East Barrière River originates near the north end of Adams Lake and flows generally east, through East Barrière Lake before joining the main Barrière River.

After its confluence with the East Barrière the main Barrière River flows west and southwest, between Barrière Mountain on the south and Mount Borthwick and Garrison Mountain on the north. It is joined by Leonie Creek just north of the town of Barriere. The river flows through the town and by the Simpcw North Thompson Indian Band "Barriere River 3A" Indian reserve before emptying into the North Thompson River.

== History ==
The Barrière River is part of the traditional lands of the Simpcw people, or "People of the North Thompson River", a division of the Secwepemc people.

In the early 19th century the Barrière River was often difficult to cross by fur traders travelling the Hudson's Bay Brigade Trail between Alexandria and Kamloops. The trail ran along the east bank of the North Thompson River and required crossing the Barrière River.

== See also ==
- List of rivers of British Columbia
- List of tributaries of the Fraser River
