= Remo, British Columbia =

Remo
- Location of Remo in British Columbia
- Coordinates: 54°28′59″N 128°43′05″W
- Country: Canada
- Province: British Columbia
- Region: Skeena
- Regional district: Kitimat–Stikine
- Time zone: UTC−07:00 (PT)
- Area codes: 250, 778, 236, & 672
- Highways: Highway 16 (TCH)
- Waterways: Skeena River

Remo is an unincorporated community in the Skeena region of west central British Columbia. Concentrated on the northwestern shore of the Skeena River and immediately northeast of the Zymagotitz River mouth, no direct link exists to the portion on the southeastern shore. On BC Highway 16, the locality is by road about 10 kilometres (6 mi) southwest of Terrace.

== Railway ==
During the railway construction, a hospital existed at Bateman's Landing (New Remo). In early October 1910, the eastward advance of the Grand Trunk Pacific Railway (GTP) rail head from Prince Rupert reached Mile 87, the Zymagotitz River.

In 1931, an eastbound passenger train struck a rockslide between Amsbury and Remo, derailing a locomotive and three fish cars. The locomotive crew jumped to safety, but a freighthopper was killed. The next year, a 30-metre (100 ft) long and 4.6-metre (15 ft) deep slide buried the tracks just west of Amsbury station. The 1936 flood, demolished the Canadian National Railway (CN) waiting room and washed away the track ballast, leaving the railway track suspended.

In 1945, a 61-metre (200 ft) long and 7.6-metre (25 ft) deep slide filled a cut west of Amsbury. A few weeks later, a larger slide occurred in a narrow cut at Amsbury.

In 1964, the swollen river began to severely erode the railbed. Working through the night, CN crews dumped rock and other fill alongside the weakened embankment, which saved the community from flooding.

The Amsbury passing track was extended in 1983. The present length is 0.8 kilometres (2,570 ft).

Train Timetables (Regular stop or Flag stop)
	Mile	1914	1920	1925	1932	1935	1943	1950	1956	1960	1961
Exstew	1688.0	Flag	Flag	Flag	Flag	Flag	Both	Flag	Flag	Flag	Flag
Shames	1681.0	Flag	Flag	Flag	Flag	Flag	Both	Flag	Flag	Flag	Flag
Amsbury^{a}	1672.9	Flag	Flag	Flag	Flag	Flag	Both	Flag	Flag	Flag	Flag
Remo	1670.3	^{b}	Flag	Flag	Flag	Flag	Flag	Flag	Flag	Flag	
Terrace	1663.3	Reg.	Reg.	Reg.	Reg.	Reg.	Reg.	Reg.	Reg.	Reg.	Reg.
Dobies	1659.0	^{c}	Flag	Flag	Flag	Flag	Flag	Flag	Flag		
Vanarsdol	1657.7	Flag	Flag	Flag	Flag	Reg.					
Kitselas	1657.7						Flag	Flag	Flag	Flag	Flag

^a. Station initially called Lakelse. The GTP assigned the revised name possibly from its prepared list. Many such names (which were associated with England) had been submitted by Josiah Wedgwood at the request of William P. Hinton, the railway's general manager. Amsbury may well have been a misspelling of Amesbury in the United Kingdom. Another possibility was the premature death in 1910 of Capt. Frederick W. Amsbury.
^b. An unofficial flag stop called Zymacord from at least 1914.
^c. An unofficial flag stop from at least 1918.

== Old Remo ==
About 1908, Harry Clarke (Henry) Breckenridge arrived.

The earliest newspaper mention of Breckenridge Landing is 1910. That year, a road opened to what would become the Terrace area. Breckenridge was the inaugural postmaster 1910–1911, and the post office was at their landing.

In October 1913, the post office name changed from Breckenridge to Remo, which is the earliest newspaper mention of the new name. Apparently, immigrant John Neidhart, postmaster 1912–1920, chose the new name, because he could not pronounce Breckenridge. Allegedly named after his German hometown, no such place seems to exist. The south shore community became known as Old Remo by 1966, the earliest newspaper mention of the present name. However, the label applies to a broad undefined area centred on Alwyn Creek.

== New Remo ==
In 1905, the Bateman family pre-empted their land. While continuing to clear the property in 1907, James E. Bateman was joined by his family. In 1909, Charles Lindstrom married James' daughter Emma. The couple bought part of the pre-emption and built at the Zymagotitz mouth. A trail up that river branched northward at the fork.

In 1917, the Kitsumkallum Timber Co built a sawmill at the river mouth and logged Zimacord Flats up the river.

In 1920, the post office relocated from the south shore of the Skeena to the north one.

In 1931–32, the school opened. The Kitsumkallum Timber mill operated until the later 1930s.

In 1942, the school closed. The November 1945 flood washed out the Zymagotitz River bridge and the approaches to the Shames River bridge, tilting the latter. At the time, most bridges in the Remo district were built on mudsills and floated off with each high water.

In 1960, the post office closed. The earliest newspaper reference to the present name of New Remo is 1966.

The current passenger transit provider is BC Transit.

== Steamboats and ferries ==
Steamboats stopped for cordwood fuel at both Breckenridge Landing and Bateman's Landing.

In 1913, a ferry existed at the mouth of the Lakelse River. That year, the subsidised seasonal ferry across the Skeena commenced.

In 1925, the surplus Terrace ferry was rebuilt and installed at Remo.

In June 1931, the ferry landing buildings were flooded. In the October 1935 floods, the main cable broke, and the reaction ferry was carried downriver, before beaching upon an island below Shames.

In May/June 1936, when the water rose above the 1920 mark, only one house was saved. The remainder, including the ferry house, drifted away. The main tower on the south side was undermined and had to be moved back. The basket tower on the north side needed straightening. Extensive riverbank and roadway were washed out.

In 1937 a new 4.5-tonne; 4.5-long-ton (5-short-ton) pontoon reaction ferry replaced the one destroyed in the 1936 flood.

In 1949, the ferry was discontinued.

== Other significant floods ==
In October 1974, logjams on the Zymagotitz caused severe flooding in New Remo.

In June 1990, the Skeena River spilled its banks, causing the evacuation of between 50 and 100 people in the Old Remo area and minor damage to about 30 homes.

In June 2002, about a dozen people left their homes in the Old Remo area, when several homes were surrounded by water.

Old Remo and New Remo continue to experience flood evacuation alerts. In addition to 2002, Old Remo was flooded in 2007 and 2017.

== Agriculture ==
The Old Remo and New Remo floodplains comprise silty loams, which provide productive land for the several farms. The former encompasses 288 hectares (712 acres) and the latter 126 hectares (311 acres).

Number of properties in 2013 with:
	fruit trees	green- houses	large gardens	large fields	cattle (herd)	horses (herd)
Old Remo	32	14	22	22	4 (20)	14 (40)
New Remo	30	7	13	6	2 (12)	4 (12)

== Amsbury ==
Amsbury is a railway point immediately east of Amsbury Creek.

The seasonal post office operated 1918 and 1919–1923.

Lakelse Lumber Co sawmill, which operated from the late 1910s until the mid-1920s, had a 7,600-metre (25,000 ft) daily capacity.

== Maps ==
- Resources near Terrace cropped map. 1925.
- "Standard Oil BC map". www.davidrumsey.com. 1937.
- "Shell BC map". www.davidrumsey.com. 1956.

== See also ==
- List of Inland Ferries in British Columbia
