= Ward Stamer =

Canadian politician

The Honourable Ward Stamer MLA

Member of the British Columbia Legislative Assembly for Kamloops-North Thompson
- Incumbent
- Assumed office October 19, 2024
- Preceded by: Peter Milobar

Minister of State for Emergency Management
- Incumbent
- Assumed office November 20, 2026
- Preceded by: Office Established

Mayor of Barriere
- In office 2018–2024

Personal details
- Party: BC Conservatives

Ward Stamer MLA is a Canadian politician who has served as a member of the Legislative Assembly of British Columbia (MLA) representing the electoral district of Kamloops-North Thompson since 2024. He is a member of the Conservative Party. Prior to provincial politics, he served as mayor of Barriere from 2018 to 2024.

== Early life and career ==
Stamer has lived in Barriere most of his life with his wife Carleen, 2 children, and 3 granddaughters. Before entering politics, he has had extensive experience working in the forestry sector as a logging contractor for almost 40 years before selling his business in 2015. He enjoys water and snow skiing and riding his motorcycle in his spare time.

He has also been dedicated to public service serving as Chairman to the Barriere Improvement District, overseeing essential services including solid waste management, streetlights, water, and fire services. He has also been a Lions Club member for over three decades.

== Political career ==
=== District of Barriere ===
Stamer was elected to Barriere town council after incorporation in 2007 before successfully running for mayor in 2018, and acclaimed as mayor for another term in 2022. He received the most votes as a councillor in municipal elections in 2011 and 2014, and tied for the most votes in 2008. The first time he ran for mayor, Stamer won with 71.47% of the votes defeating his opponent, Mike Fennell. As mayor, he also sat on the Thompson-Nicola Regional District Board. He resigned as mayor after winning his seat in the provincial election.

In 2021, Stamer sought the federal Conservative nomination for Kamloops-Thompson-Cariboo, but lost to current MP, Frank Caputo.

=== 2024 provincial election ===
Stamer had been a longtime Social Credit Party supporter, but decided to jump on board with the Conservative Party of BC after becoming "disillusioned" by the BC Liberals' policies and governance. In March 2024, Stamer was nominated as the Conservative Party of BC's candidate for Kamloops-North Thompson. He went on to win a seat in the Legislative Assembly of BC with 59.7% of the vote.

Stamer currently serves on the official opposition's shadow cabinet as the Critic for Forests. He has since called on the BC NDP to denounce lethal tree spiking in Fairy Creek to protect forestry workers, and to address critical issues facing the forestry sector such as delays in permitting. His policy priorities include healthcare access, affordable housing, economic stability, and revitalizing the local economy by promoting resource industries.

== Electoral record ==
2026 British Columbia general election: Kamloops-North Thompson
Party	Candidate	Votes	%	±%	Expenditures
Conservative	Ward Stamer	18,237	64.44		
New Democratic	Kory Clark	8,200	28.98		
OneBC	Deborah Friesen	1,767	6.24		
Total valid votes		28,204	99.66		
Total rejected ballots		95	0.34		
Turnout		28,299			
Registered voters					
Conservative hold		Swing		+4.66	
Source: Elections BC

2024 British Columbia general election: Kamloops-North Thompson
Party	Candidate	Votes	%	±%	Expenditures
Conservative	Ward Stamer	17,930	59.74	+55.1	$23,793.91
New Democratic	Maddi Genn	9,874	32.90	-0.6	$24,324.38
Green	Tristan Cavers	2,209	7.36	-4.3	$0.00
Total valid votes/expense limit		30,013	99.83	–	$71,700.08
Total rejected ballots		51	0.17	–	
Turnout		30,064	61.86	–	
Registered voters		48,598			
Conservative notional gain from BC United		Swing		N/A (Note: Swing cannot be calculated as BC United did not run a candidate in this riding.)	
Source: Elections BC

== See also ==
- 43rd Parliament of British Columbia
