= Taylor Landing Provincial Park =

Provincial park in British Columbia, Canada

- IUCN category II (national park)
- Location within British Columbia
- Interactive map of Taylor Landing Provincial Park
- Location: British Columbia, Canada
- Nearest city: Fort St. John
- Coordinates: 56°08′04″N 120°39′57″W
- Area: 0.02 km^{2} (0.0077 sq mi)
- Established: August 2, 1978
- Governing body: BC Parks

Taylor Landing Provincial Park is a provincial park in British Columbia, Canada.
