= Avola, British Columbia =

Avola
- Community
- Location of Avola in British Columbia
- Coordinates: 51°46′59″N 119°19′04″W
- Country: Canada
- Province: British Columbia
- Region: Thompson Country
- Regional district: Thompson-Nicola
- Time zone: UTC−07:00 (PT)
- Area codes: 250, 778, 236, & 672
- Highways: Highway 5
- Waterways: North Thompson River

Avola is an unincorporated community in the Thompson region of eastern British Columbia. The former ferry site is on the west shore of the North Thompson River immediately north of the mouth of Avola Creek. Off BC Highway 5, the locality is by road about 190 kilometres (118 mi) northeast of the Kamloops and 40 kilometres (25 mi) south of Blue River.

== Name origin ==
The general area, which stretched about 26 kilometres (16 mi), had been known as Stillwater Flat for 50 years prior to the new station being named in 1913 by the Canadian Northern Railway (CNoR) after the Sicilian town of Avola. Since the opening of the post office that year equally demanded a unique name to avoid confusion with the Stillwater one elsewhere, it is unclear who was the prime instigator of the new name. The earliest newspaper reference to the name was August 1913.

== Earlier community ==
Harry F. Hardy, who arrived in the general area in 1909, drove the Chu Chua–Vavenby stage 1911–1913, which sometimes extended as far as Wire Cache. W.C. (Charlie) Fowler, who opened the first store, was the inaugural postmaster 1913–1938. Charlie's brother Edmund (Ed) partnered in the store (on the western side of the track opposite the station and immediately south of the settlement which later developed).

By the early 1920s, a community hall existed. In 1925, Eva Lawrence was the inaugural teacher and the school was housed in a building moved from Wire Cache. About this time, Charlie Fowler built Avola House, a hotel/boarding house. A 1928 fire destroyed the general store.

The new log community hall opened in 1937, and Avola House closed two years later.

In 1941, a new school building opened, and fire destroyed the general store. In 1949, a teacherage was erected. Across the road from the general store, the former Avola House burned down the following year.

The community hall was renovated during 1959 and 1960.

A 1962 fire destroyed the general store. In 1967, the BCTel exchange opened. The next year, the Topaze Restaurant opened. Also that year, when BC Hydro transmission lines introduced electricity to the area, the four diesel generators supplying Avola were decommissioned.

In 1970, the motel opened. In 1976, no damage or injuries were sustained when a small plane was forced to land on a hayfield during fog and rain.

In 1983, a public library opened, but the school closed the next year.

== Railway ==
On the halting of the Russian–American Telegraph project in the 1860s, coils of copper wire were abandoned. The location, which became known as Wire Cache, was at the southern end of Stillwater Flats. During the CNoR surveying, engineers found about 450 tons of this wire, which became economically retrievable once the railway arrived. In April 1914, the eastward advance of the rail head passed through Avola.

The Avola passing track on the predominantly single-track subdivision was 0.9 kilometres (2,990 ft) in 1916, progressively extending to the current 6.6 kilometres (4.1 mi).

When flying embers from a forest fire in 1920 endangered the station and water tower, a locomotive soaked the structures with water, and trains passing through the area were first doused under the preceding water towers.

On being struck by a Canadian National Railway (CN) passenger train near Messiter in 1923, a man died hours later.

When a children's sleigh ran into the side of a CN freight train at the railway crossing in 1938, three of the five children involved were hospitalized.

In 1942, an eastbound passenger train was late in responding to a red warning flag and while braking ran headlong into the empty observation car at the rear of another passenger train stopped for water. Three died and 35 were admitted to hospital in Kamloops, from where two ambulances came. In gratitude, CN refurbished the grand reception area of the hospital which had housed the overflow of patients.

In 1947, a freighthopper made a fatal fall from a moving westbound tank car.

On being struck by an eastbound passenger train at the railway crossing in 1949, a truck was carried down the track and the driver died en route to hospital.

In 1954, a CN caterpillar ploughed through the road bridge at the station.

In 1960, the CN water tower was demolished.

In 1961, a freight derailment at Cottonwood Flats spilled wheat across the road.

In 1969, a track patrolman died when his speeder collided head on with a freight train. Months later, 16 cars of a westbound freight train derailed.

In 1972, two locomotives and 38 cars of a westbound freight train derailed. When a westbound passenger train struck a slide near Vavenby a month later, three locomotives and two cars derailed. Passengers remained in the others cars, which were pulled back to Avola, where the travellers were transferred to buses.

In 1980, 18 cars of a westbound coal train derailed.

In 1982, a freight derailment spilled sulfur which caught fire a month later.

In the early 1980s, the station agent and buildings were removed.

In 2005, 11 cars of a westbound 92-container transport train derailed, spilling their contents and tearing up track. Two months later, two locomotives and two freight cars derailed, sending the lead locomotive down an embankment.

CN, Official Guide, and VIA, Train Timetables (Regular stop or Flag stop)
	Mile	1916	1923	1927	1933	1938	1943	1947	1950	1956	1960	1963	1965	1971	1976	1980	1982
Vavenby	2579.0	Regular	Regular	Regular			Flag		Flag	Flag	Flag	Flag	^{a}	^{a}	^{a}	^{a}	
Irvine	2573.1	Regular	Regular	Regular			Flag		Flag	Flag	Flag						
Wabron	2567.3						Flag		Flag	Flag	Flag	Flag					
McMurphy	2563.4	Regular	Regular	Regular			Flag		Flag	Flag	Flag	Flag					
Wire Cache	2555.8			Regular			Flag		Flag	Flag	Flag						
Avola	2550.8		Regular	Regular	Regular	Regular	Flag	Both	Both	Both	Both	Both	^{a}	^{a}	^{a}	^{a}	
Cottonwood Flats	2544.8	Regular		Regular			Flag		Flag	Flag	Flag						
Messiter	2539.6	Regular	Regular	Regular			Flag		Flag	Flag	Flag	Flag					
Wolfenden	2534.2		Regular	Regular			Flag		Flag	Flag	Flag	Flag					
Trout Creek	2530.4	Regular															
Angushorn	2530.4						Flag		Flag	Flag	Flag	Flag					
Blue River	2526.0	Regular	Regular	Regular	Regular	Regular	Regular	Regular	Regular	Regular	Regular	Regular	Regular	Regular	Regular	Regular	

^a. Pre-arranged stop only.

== Ferry, bridges, and roads ==
By the late 1890s, Kamloops–Little Fort comprised a good wagon road, beyond which a pack trail extended to Stillwater Flat. By 1911, the wagon road had reached the Flat.

Although a subsidized cable ferry was anticipated in 1913–14, a free reaction ferry was not installed until 1922.

The seasonal road was considered good by 1919 and fairly good by 1926. At that time, a 110-kilometre (70 mi) gap separated it from the passable Albreda–Jasper road. However, a CN flatcar typically transported vehicles over the Albreda–Jasper section for many years.

In 1930, the Avola–Blue River section of the highway opened. In 1938, the ferry was discontinued.

During the early 1940s, the remaining gap north of Blue River was completed. North of Avola, the road hung on trestles along the cliff, above the railway on the west side of Little Hell's Gate. From the late 1940s to the late 1950s, the Mengie bridge existed to the island.

In 1966, the highway was paved northeastward to Avola. To relocate the highway northward from the west side of the river to the east, Hans Mordhorst was awarded the bridge substructure in 1967 and A.I.M. Steel the fabrication and erection of steel in 1968.

In 1958, Yellowhead Coach Lines bought North River Coach Lines. In 1964, Yellowhead Coach Lines extended the route northeastward from Vavenby to Avola for three days per week. The next year, B.C. Coach Lines acquired the company.

In 2001, the highway bridge was redecked.

Prior to ceasing all intraprovincial services in 2018, Greyhound Canada reduced service in 2013 from two to one trip daily at stops such as Avola.

The Kamloops–Edmonton route of Thompson Valley Charters stops in Avola.

== Forestry ==
Logging not only brought people to the area but also was the primary industry for Avola. In 1917, Stillwater Lumber & Shingle established a shingle mill. Gimhart & Upper, who purchased the mill in 1926, proceeded with earlier plans to erect a new sawmill after the mill burned down months later. The mill operated possibly as late as the mid-1930s.

In the mid-1940s, Blue River Logging established the Avola Mills. In 1951, the corporate structure changed. Called Diamond Mills by the late 1950s, Ray Gould sold the operations to a BC syndicate in 1961.

In 1965, Weyerhaeuser acquired Merritt Diamond Mills, which included the Avola mill. In 1969, an employee died when the mill bunkhouse caught fire.

In 1972, the KP Wood Products sawmill at Avola closed.

== Later community ==
In 2000, fire destroyed the post office and Topaze Restaurant. The next year, the general store was converted to a neighbourhood pub. Around 2005, the library closed, and the seldom used schoolhouse was transferred to the Thompson–Nicola Regional District for $1 for use as a community hall.

In 2013, potential damage to the log walls by a sand pressure treatment of the former one-room schoolhouse caused dissension in the community of under 60 residents. However, the concerns proved unfounded. In 2015, the Nature Conservancy of Canada acquired 3.0 hectares (7.4 acres) of wetland and forest land to establish a protected habitat for salmon spawning. In 2024, the most recent burial at the small cemetery occurred, and a campaign to save the concrete pad (upon which the Avola generators once stood) was unsuccessful. In the distant past, a light plane, which had lost its bearings, was able to find its way on sighting the lights of Avola.

Since 2003, several Avola Reunion weekends have been held.

The regional mobile library visits the community, but the post office (operating until 2022) has since closed. Current facilities include the Avola Mountain Motel, Log Inn Pub, Avola Campground, and a gas station with a small convenience store. Forestry is the prime industry.

== Maps ==
- "Rand McNally BC map". www.davidrumsey.com. 1925.
- "Standard Oil BC map". www.davidrumsey.com. 1937.
- "Shell BC map". www.davidrumsey.com. 1956.
