= McLure, British Columbia =

Coordinates: 48.751°N 124.493°W

Location of McLure in British Columbia

McLure is a settlement in British Columbia. Carl's fruit stand on the Yellowhead Highway is a popular stop for tourists.

There is also the McLure reaction ferry which is the only crossing of the North Thompson River between Kamloops and Barriere.
