= Clearwater, British Columbia =

Clearwater
- District municipality
- District of Clearwater
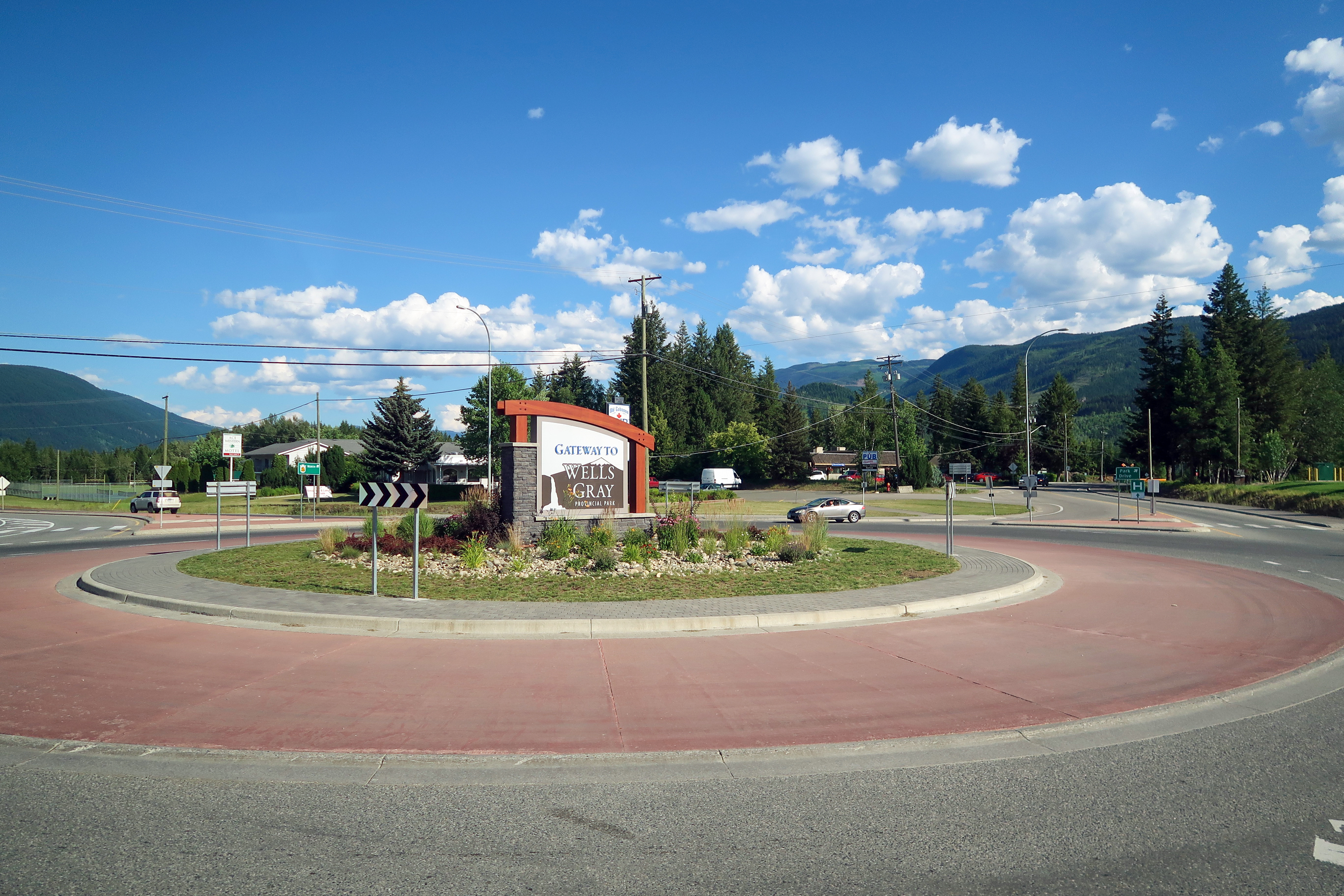
- Clearwater roundabout near Southern Yellowhead Highway

- Location of Clearwater in British Columbia
- Coordinates: 51°39′N 120°02′W
- Country: Canada
- Province: British Columbia
- Regional district: Thompson-Nicola
- Incorporated: 2007

Area
  - Total: 55.68 km^{2} (21.50 sq mi)
- Elevation: 460 m (1,510 ft)

Population (2016)
  - Total: 2,324
  - Density: 41.74/km^{2} (108.1/sq mi)
- Time zone: UTC−07:00 (PT)
- Postal Code: V0E
- Area code: 250 / 778 / 236
- Highways: Highway 5
- Website: districtofclearwater.com

Clearwater is a district municipality in the North Thompson River valley in British Columbia, Canada, where the Clearwater River empties into the North Thompson River. It is located 124 km (77 mi) north of Kamloops. The District of Clearwater was established on December 3, 2007, making it one of the newest municipalities in British Columbia. It is near Wells Gray Provincial Park and is surrounded by the Trophy Mountains, Raft Mountain and Dunn Peak.

== History ==
Prior to European settlement, the area was occupied by the Okelhs First Nations, and later Chilcotins.

The fur trade brought the earliest settlers to the area. The Overlanders expedition to the Cariboo goldfields rafted down the North Thompson River in 1862. When they first arrived at the mouth of the Clearwater River, they named it for its distinct clarity compared to the relatively muddy waters of the North Thompson. The Overlanders also named Raft Mountain, which rises northeast of Clearwater to a height of 2,450 m (8,038 ft).

=== Other dates ===
- 1914 - Rail access was established. Previously access had been by steam boat or overland.
- 1953 - Transmountain pipeline completed through area.
- 1970s -Yellowhead Highway complete through area.
- 1968 - Clearwater is incorporated as a settlement.
- December 2007 - Municipal government is incorporated.

== Geography, location and climate ==
=== Geography ===
Clearwater is 406 metres above sea level. It is located in the North Thompson Valley in the Shuswap Highlands of the Interior Plateau. The Cariboo Mountains are located to the west and the Monashee Mountains to the east.

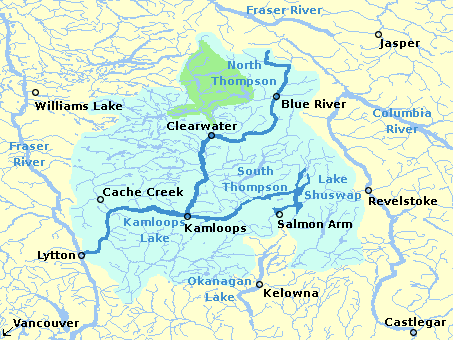
Map of Thompson watershed

=== Climate ===
Climate data for Vavenby
Month	Jan	Feb	Mar	Apr	May	Jun	Jul	Aug	Sep	Oct	Nov	Dec	Year
Record high °C (°F)	12.8 (55.0)	15.6 (60.1)	22.8 (73.0)	32.8 (91.0)	37.8 (100.0)	45.0 (113.0)	41.1 (106.0)	38.3 (100.9)	35.0 (95.0)	26.1 (79.0)	20.0 (68.0)	15.0 (59.0)	45.0 (113.0)
Mean daily maximum °C (°F)	−2.0 (28.4)	1.5 (34.7)	8.4 (47.1)	15.1 (59.2)	19.7 (67.5)	23.0 (73.4)	26.0 (78.8)	25.7 (78.3)	19.0 (66.2)	10.4 (50.7)	2.7 (36.9)	−1.8 (28.8)	12.3 (54.1)
Daily mean °C (°F)	−5.2 (22.6)	−2.7 (27.1)	2.7 (36.9)	8.0 (46.4)	12.3 (54.1)	15.7 (60.3)	18.2 (64.8)	17.6 (63.7)	12.1 (53.8)	5.7 (42.3)	−0.2 (31.6)	−4.7 (23.5)	6.6 (43.9)
Mean daily minimum °C (°F)	−8.3 (17.1)	−6.8 (19.8)	−3.0 (26.6)	0.9 (33.6)	4.8 (40.6)	8.4 (47.1)	10.3 (50.5)	9.4 (48.9)	5.1 (41.2)	0.9 (33.6)	−3.1 (26.4)	−7.6 (18.3)	0.9 (33.6)
Record low °C (°F)	−46.1 (−51.0)	−41.1 (−42.0)	−31.7 (−25.1)	−16.1 (3.0)	−7.2 (19.0)	−3.3 (26.1)	0.6 (33.1)	−1.7 (28.9)	−8.3 (17.1)	−19.0 (−2.2)	−32.0 (−25.6)	−41.7 (−43.1)	−46.1 (−51.0)
Average precipitation mm (inches)	39.5 (1.56)	22.4 (0.88)	25.0 (0.98)	29.8 (1.17)	43.8 (1.72)	56.5 (2.22)	58.2 (2.29)	43.1 (1.70)	37.2 (1.46)	43.2 (1.70)	44.1 (1.74)	41.4 (1.63)	484.1 (19.06)
Average rainfall mm (inches)	12.3 (0.48)	10.7 (0.42)	20.0 (0.79)	29.0 (1.14)	43.6 (1.72)	56.5 (2.22)	58.2 (2.29)	43.1 (1.70)	37.2 (1.46)	43.2 (1.70)	26.8 (1.06)	10.9 (0.43)	389.3 (15.33)
Average snowfall cm (inches)	27.2 (10.7)	11.7 (4.6)	5.0 (2.0)	0.9 (0.4)	0.1 (0.0)	0 (0)	0 (0)	0 (0)	0 (0)	2.2 (0.9)	17.3 (6.8)	30.4 (12.0)	94.8 (37.3)

== Demographics ==
In the 2021 Census of Population conducted by Statistics Canada, Clearwater had a population of 2,388 living in 1,057 of its 1,145 total private dwellings, a change of 2.8% from its 2016 population of 2,324. With a land area of 55.65 km^{2} (21.49 sq mi), it had a population density of 42.9/km^{2} (111.1/sq mi) in 2021.

The 2017 unemployment rate was 5.7%. The majority of residents are married or live common law.

=== Language ===
Nearly all residents speak English as their mother tongue though there is a small proportion who speak French.

=== Religion ===
According to the 2021 census, religious groups in Clearwater included:

- Irreligion (1,770 persons or 75.2%)
- Christianity (540 persons or 22.9%)
- Other (35 persons or 1.5%)

== Industry ==
=== Forestry ===
Forestry was the principal industry in the area. There was one major mill in the area, in Vavenby, but that mill was closed permanently by Canfor in 2019 due to outdated equipment. There are several woodlot licenses within the area.

=== Agriculture ===
There is local production of beef, alfalfa, hay crops and vegetables.

=== Tourism ===
Tourism is where Clearwater gains international recognition. The town of Clearwater calls itself the "gateway to Wells Gray Provincial Park", as the main access to the park is through the town. The park houses a multitude of lakes and waterfalls, including several inactive and potentially active volcanoes.

In 2012 the total number of tourism based visitors was 578,445. In 2011 the estimated economic impact of tourism in Wells Gray Country was $21,513,261. Sports tourism is also a growth sector for the community.

=== Mining ===
The town is close to the Ruddock Creek mine and the Harper Creek mine. The forest industry, tourism, and related outdoors and sports services are major industries in the area.

== Sports ==
=== Parks ===
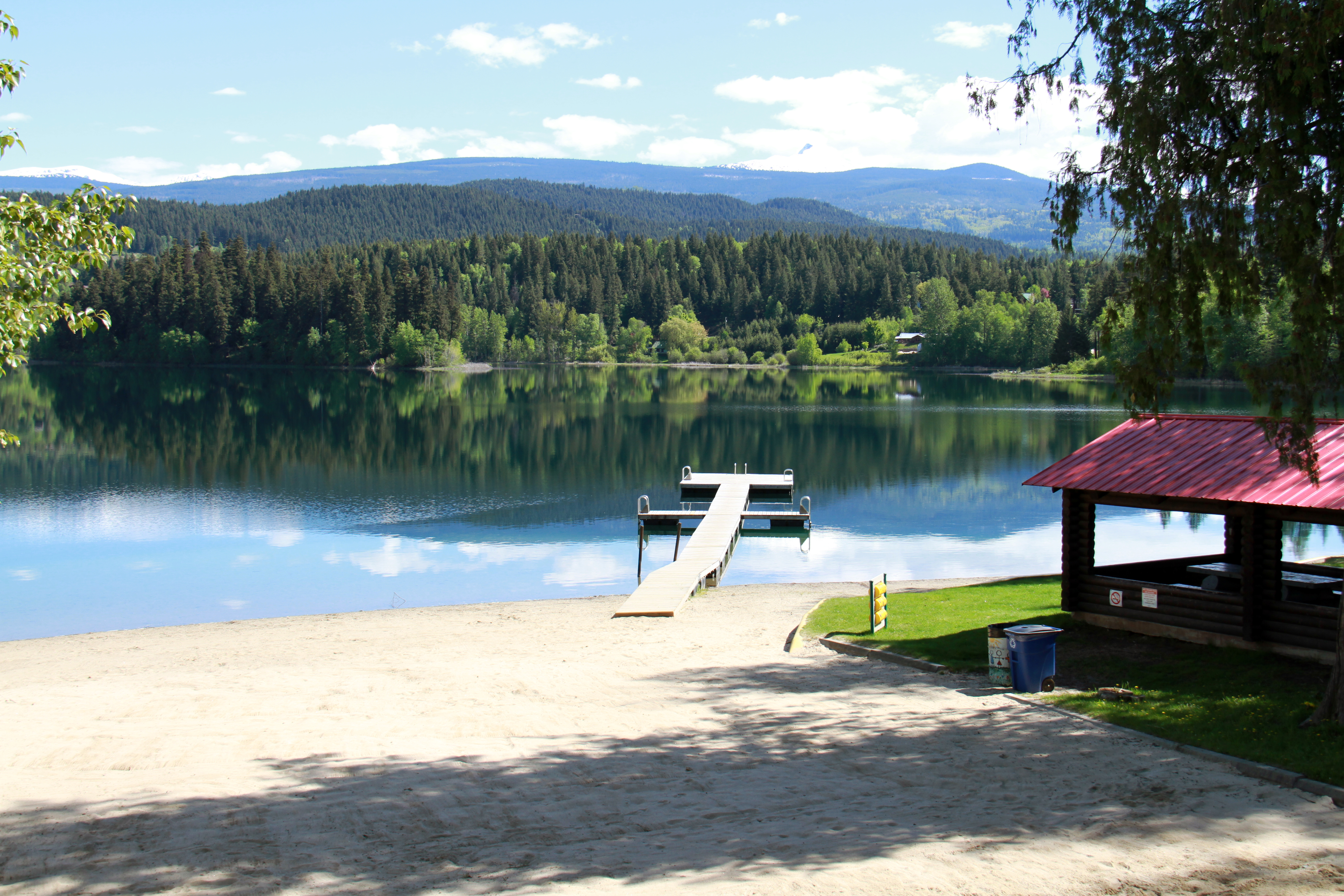
View of the beach at Dutch Lake Park

Within the city there are 7 parks; Capostinsky Park, Chad Memorial Park, Dutch Lake park, Raft River Viewing Park, Rotary Sports Park, Weyerhaeuser Pioneer Park and Wyndhaven Park. Dutch Lake Park has a beach and there are a number of water activities there in the summer as well as ice fishing in the winter.

Wells Gray Provincial Park is located just to the north. The park encompasses 5,250 square kilometres, with four rivers, six major lakes, and 39 named waterfalls, including Canada's fourth highest, Helmcken Falls.

=== Mountain biking ===
A mountain bike park is located at Candle Creek, east of the city centre. This consists of 13 km of mountain and cross country trails. There are also trails present that head North from the city into Wells Gray park.

=== Cross country skiing / snowshoeing ===
A series of cross country ski trails and snowshoeing trails are present at Candle Creek, east of the city centre.

=== Downhill skiing ===
The Clearwater Ski Hill is located on the south side of the city, which includes a small hill with a T-bar. This lift was the fastest T-bar in western Canada when it was installed.

== Education ==
=== K - 12 ===
Clearwater has two schools: Raft River Elementary with approximately 300 students and Clearwater Secondary School with about 225 students. Clearwater Secondary School's team sports are named "The Raiders" and include soccer, rugby, volleyball, and basketball. Currently, they play in single "A" categories. The school falls under the jurisdiction of School District #73.

=== Post-secondary ===
The closest university to the town is Thompson Rivers University in Kamloops. The university has a branch location in the town which provides a limited number of specialized courses.

== Healthcare ==
=== Hospital ===
Dr. Helmcken Memorial Hospital
- Interior Health

Geography
- Location: Clearwater, British Columbia, British Columbia, Canada

Organization
- Care system: Medicare
- Type: General, Teaching
- Affiliated university: UBC Faculty of Medicine

Services
- Emergency department: Yes

History
- Founded: 1972

Links
- Website: https://www.interiorhealth.ca/FindUs/_layouts/FindUs/info.aspx?type=Location&loc=Dr.%20Helmcken%20Memorial%20Hospital&svc=&ploc=

The community is serviced locally by Dr. Helmcken Memorial Hospital, a level 1 community hospital. It has an emergency department, acute care beds as well as long care beds. This hospital refers patients to Royal Inland Hospital in Kamloops.

The hospital was originally founded in 1972 and consisted of several portable buildings connected together. Prior to its construction there was no prior hospital in the area, no prior regular physician and no drug store. A new multi-level hospital was opened June 10, 2002. The original hospital structure was demolished in 2016. It is named after Dr. John Sebastian Helmcken.

=== Assisted Living ===
Assisted living is provided in the adjacent Evergreen Acres and is scheduled for an expansion.

== Transportation ==
- Road - Clearwater is located on the Yellowhead Highway #5. Its closest major junctions are to the south (Highway 24 in Little Fort) and to the North (Yellowhead Highway #16), diverging between Prince George and Edmonton.
- Rail - Via Rail's The Canadian calls at the Clearwater station three times per week in each direction; this is a flag stop. The Canadian National Railway mainline runs through the town.
Services
- Preceding station	Via Rail	Following station
  Kamloops North toward Vancouver	The Canadian	Blue River toward Toronto
- Air - Scenic flights and fixed-wing air charter services are provided by Wells Gray Air from the Clearwater Airport. International and domestic scheduled air service is provided in Kamloops. Chartered helicopter service is also available.
- Bus - For travel outside of the city there is a community service bus provided by BC transit. With the closure of Greyhound Lines Canadian routes, there is no longer any commercial bus service to the town, though there are plans for this in the future. For travel within the town there is scheduled bus service with limited ride times.
