= North Thompson River =

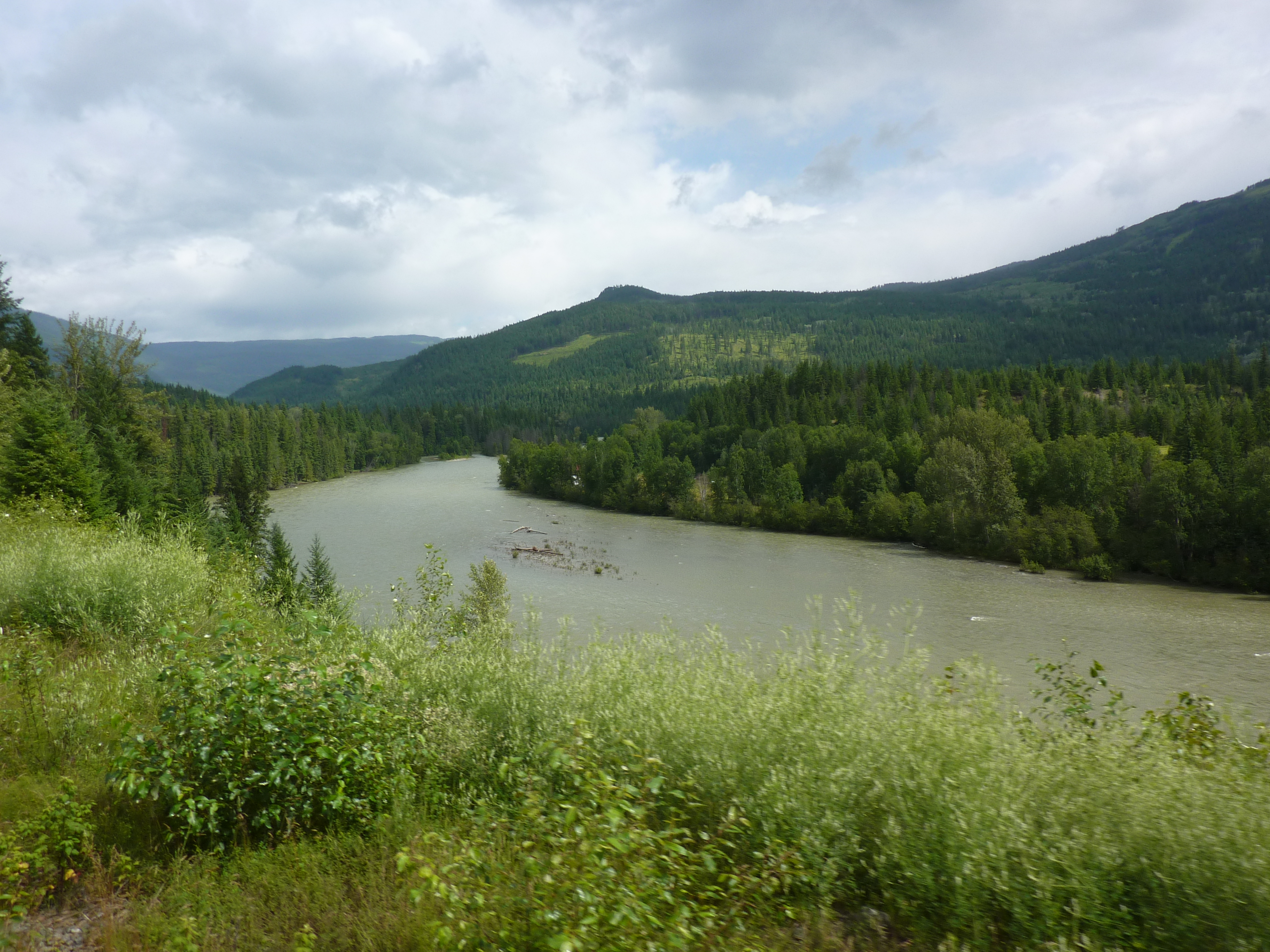
- North Thompson River near Vavenby

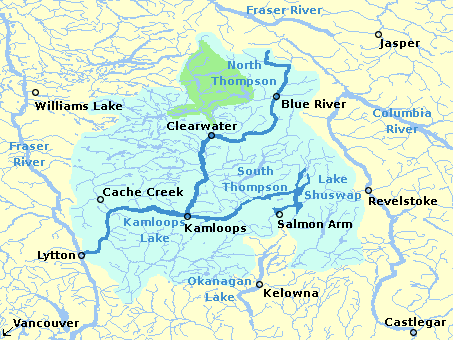
- Thompson River's watershed
- Etymology: The Thompson River was named by Simon Fraser in honour of David Thompson

Location
- Country: Canada
- Province: British Columbia
- Land District: Kamloops Division Yale

Physical characteristics
- Source: Thompson Glacier
  - location: Premier Range, Cariboo Mountains
  - coordinates: 52°40′56″N 119°40′25″W
  - elevation: 1,675 m (5,495 ft)
- Mouth: Thompson River
  - location: Kamloops
  - coordinates: 50°40′55″N 120°20′28″W
  - elevation: 339 m (1,112 ft)
- Length: 365 km (227 mi)
- Basin size: 20,000 km^{2} (7,700 sq mi)
- Discharge
  - location: McLure Ferry
  - average: 427 m^{3}/s (15,100 cu ft/s)
  - minimum: 39.2 m^{3}/s (1,380 cu ft/s)
  - maximum: 2,740 m^{3}/s (97,000 cu ft/s)

Basin features
- River system: Fraser River

The North Thompson River is the northern branch of the Thompson River, the largest tributary of the Fraser River, in the Canadian province of British Columbia. It originates at the toe of the Thompson Glacier in the Premier Range of the Cariboo Mountains, west of the community of Valemount. The river flows generally south through the North Thompson Valley towards Kamloops where it joins the South Thompson River to form the main stem Thompson River.

For most of its length, the river is paralleled by Highway 5, and the Canadian National Railway (both of which cross the river a couple of times). The North Thompson passes by several small communities, the most notable being Blue River, Clearwater, and Barriere.

Tributaries of the North Thompson River include Pyramid Creek, Canvas Creek, the Albreda River, Thunder River, Mud Creek, Blue River, Mad River, Raft River, Clearwater River, and Barrière River.

The North Thompson's largest tributary is the Clearwater River, which joins at the town of Clearwater. The Clearwater River drains much of Wells Gray Provincial Park.

A notable feature along the North Thompson is Little Hells Gate, a mini-replica of the much larger Hells Gate rapids on the Fraser River. About 17.4 kilometres (10.8 mi) upstream from the small town of Avola, the North Thompson River is forced through a narrow chute only about 30 feet (9.1 m) wide, creating a rapid that resembles the Fraser's famous rapid. Many river rafting companies offer a variety of trips through the rapids.

== See also ==
- List of rivers of British Columbia
- List of tributaries of the Fraser River
