= Vavenby =

Community in British Columbia, Canada

- Location of Vavenby in British Columbia
- Coordinates: 51°34′55″N 119°43′11″W
- Country: Canada
- Province: British Columbia
- Time zone: UTC−07:00 (PT)
- Area codes: 250, 778

Vavenby is a community of approximately 700 residents located in the province of British Columbia, Canada. Economy in the region centres primarily on forestry, logging, agriculture, and tourism. Adjacent to the community lies the North Thompson River, the Yellowhead Highway (#5), and the Canadian National Railway.

== History ==
Franklin Allingham was the first European resident in the upper North Thompson valley before the railway arrived. He homesteaded a four hundred acres (160 hectares) piece of land around 1886 on the north side of the North Thompson River. This location is approximately two kilometres from the present day township.

In 1910, the original postmaster Daubney Pridgeon suggested that the settlement be named after his birthplace Navenby but the postal authorities misread his handwriting and the settlement was named Vavenby.

== Economic history ==
The economy in the community continues to heavily reflect that of the lumber industry. The two mills Weyerhaeuser and Slocan-Canfor were positioned side by side on the north side of the river until, in 2002, Weyerhaeuser shut down its Vavenby operation choosing to focus on other locations in western Canada. This resulted in a significant depletion of employment in the region and a rapid population reduction. Weyerhaeuser retained logging rights in the area, keeping the local loggers and foresters employed. In 2004, a finger jointing mill proposed purchase of the Weyerhaeuser, Vavenby mill property and was scheduled to begin production, but the company went bankrupt before the plant became fully operational. The region has been showing signs of economic recovery though. The Canfor mill which had been indefinitely closed in 2009 due to poor market conditions reopened in September 2011 after $24 million in capital upgrades, and in January 2012 it added a second shift for a total of 145 jobs restored to the local region. Closing yet again in 2019 leaving the town with little economy. Yellow Head Mining Corp began exploration in 2007 of the Harper Creek Mine project sited on Harper Mountain approximately 10 km south of town. The Environmental Assessment stage continued through 2013. Yellow Head Mining Corp also purchased the old Weyerhaeuser mill site as an ore handling facility in 2012.

== Climate ==
Climate data for Vavenby
Month	Jan	Feb	Mar	Apr	May	Jun	Jul	Aug	Sep	Oct	Nov	Dec	Year
Record high °C (°F)	12.8 (55.0)	15.6 (60.1)	22.8 (73.0)	32.8 (91.0)	37.8 (100.0)	37.8 (100.0)	41.1 (106.0)	38.3 (100.9)	35.0 (95.0)	26.1 (79.0)	20.0 (68.0)	15.0 (59.0)	41.1 (106.0)
Mean daily maximum °C (°F)	−2.0 (28.4)	1.5 (34.7)	8.4 (47.1)	15.1 (59.2)	19.7 (67.5)	23.0 (73.4)	26.0 (78.8)	25.7 (78.3)	19.0 (66.2)	10.4 (50.7)	2.7 (36.9)	−1.8 (28.8)	12.3 (54.1)
Daily mean °C (°F)	−5.2 (22.6)	−2.7 (27.1)	2.7 (36.9)	8.0 (46.4)	12.3 (54.1)	15.7 (60.3)	18.2 (64.8)	17.6 (63.7)	12.1 (53.8)	5.7 (42.3)	−0.2 (31.6)	−4.7 (23.5)	6.6 (43.9)
Mean daily minimum °C (°F)	−8.3 (17.1)	−6.8 (19.8)	−3.0 (26.6)	0.9 (33.6)	4.8 (40.6)	8.4 (47.1)	10.3 (50.5)	9.4 (48.9)	5.1 (41.2)	0.9 (33.6)	−3.1 (26.4)	−7.6 (18.3)	0.9 (33.6)
Record low °C (°F)	−46.1 (−51.0)	−41.1 (−42.0)	−31.7 (−25.1)	−16.1 (3.0)	−7.2 (19.0)	−3.3 (26.1)	0.6 (33.1)	−1.7 (28.9)	−8.3 (17.1)	−19.0 (−2.2)	−32.0 (−25.6)	−41.7 (−43.1)	−46.1 (−51.0)
Average precipitation mm (inches)	39.5 (1.56)	22.4 (0.88)	25.0 (0.98)	29.8 (1.17)	43.8 (1.72)	56.5 (2.22)	58.2 (2.29)	43.1 (1.70)	37.2 (1.46)	43.2 (1.70)	44.1 (1.74)	41.4 (1.63)	484.1 (19.06)
Average rainfall mm (inches)	12.3 (0.48)	10.7 (0.42)	20.0 (0.79)	29.0 (1.14)	43.6 (1.72)	56.5 (2.22)	58.2 (2.29)	43.1 (1.70)	37.2 (1.46)	41.0 (1.61)	26.8 (1.06)	10.9 (0.43)	389.3 (15.33)
Average snowfall cm (inches)	27.2 (10.7)	11.7 (4.6)	5.0 (2.0)	0.9 (0.4)	0.1 (0.0)	0.0 (0.0)	0.0 (0.0)	0.0 (0.0)	0.0 (0.0)	2.2 (0.9)	17.3 (6.8)	30.4 (12.0)	94.8 (37.3)
Average precipitation days (≥ 0.2 mm)	15.3	11.0	13.9	13.9	16.1	16.7	14.6	12.0	12.2	16.3	16.9	14.2	172.9
Average rainy days (≥ 0.2 mm)	6.2	6.7	12.0	13.9	16.1	16.7	14.6	12.0	12.2	15.9	12.3	5.5	143.9
Average snowy days (≥ 0.2 cm)	10.8	5.2	2.5	0.5	0.1	0.0	0.0	0.0	0.0	0.9	6.2	9.7	35.9
