= Bridge Lake =

Bridge Lake may refer to:

- Bridge Lake (British Columbia), a lake in the South Cariboo region of the Interior of British Columbia, Canada
- Bridge Lake, British Columbia, a community located on Bridge Lake, British Columbia, Canada
- Bridge Lake Provincial Park, a provincial park located on Bridge Lake, British Columbia, Canada
- Bridge Lake in Park County, Montana, United States
