= Hathaway Lake =

Lake in British Columbia, Canada

- Location within British Columbia
- Location: Cariboo Regional District, British Columbia
- Coordinates: 51°39′26″N 120°50′2″W
- Primary outflows: Hathaway Creek (Sulphurous Lake)
- Basin countries: Canada
- Max. length: 5 kilometres (3.1 mi)
- Surface area: 152.17 hectares (376.0 acres)
- Average depth: 19.7 m (65 ft)
- Max. depth: 45.1 metres (148 ft)
- Surface elevation: 1,113 metres (3,652 ft)

Hathaway Lake is a freshwater lake located in the Cariboo region of British Columbia, Canada. It is located in the Interlakes area in the Sulphurous Lake basin, approximately 35 kilometres (22 mi) north east of Lone Butte or 45 kilometres (28 mi) east of 100 Mile House.

== Recreation & community ==
The lake is the location of the Hathaway Lake Resort and Moosehaven Resort. The Sulphurous Lake Volunteer Fire Department provides fire protection for the cabin community on the south shore of the lake. The lake is stocked with Kokanee, Burbot, and Rainbow Trout.

== See also ==
- List of lakes of British Columbia
