= Lac des Roches (British Columbia) =

Lake in British Columbia, Canada

- Location within British Columbia
- Location: Cariboo Country, British Columbia
- Coordinates: 51°28′03″N 120°34′02″W
- Basin countries: Canada
- Max. length: 8.1 km (5.0 mi)
- Max. width: 1.2 km (0.75 mi)
- Surface area: 6.6 km^{2} (2.5 sq mi)
- Average depth: 22 m (72 ft)
- Max. depth: 47.2 m (155 ft)
- Surface elevation: 1,128 m (3,701 ft)
- Islands: Eagle Island

Lac des Roches originally identified as Lac des Roche (Long) is a lake in the Interlakes District straddling the South Cariboo and Thompson-Nicola regions of the Interior of British Columbia, Canada, with approximately two-thirds of its area in the South Cariboo region.

The lake is approximately 6 km^{2} in area and is at an elevation of 1128 m. It is located 485 km north of Vancouver and around 125 km northwest of Kamloops in the Interlakes District. The Little Fort Highway (BC Highway 24) runs along the north side of the lake. Lac des Roches is connected to its neighbour, the much smaller Little Lac des Roches (36 ha) by a narrow channel. Its larger neighbours further to the east along the Interlakes Highway include Bridge Lake and Sheridan Lake.

== Recreation ==
Both Lac des Roches and little Lac des Roches are annually stocked with rainbow trout and kokanee and also has native populations of brown trout, largescale sucker, brook trout, lake trout and burbot. There are several resorts established on the shores of both lakes supporting recreation in the area.

== See also ==
- List of lakes of British Columbia
