= Sheridan Lake (British Columbia) =

Lake in British Columbia, Canada

- Location within British Columbia
- Location: Cariboo Country, British Columbia
- Coordinates: 51°31′09″N 120°53′42″W
- Basin countries: Canada
- Max. length: 8.3 km (5.2 mi)
- Surface area: 16.5 km^{2} (6.4 sq mi)
- Average depth: 7.5 m (25 ft)
- Max. depth: 35 m (115 ft)
- Surface elevation: 1,117 m (3,665 ft)

Sheridan Lake is a lake in the Interlakes District of the South Cariboo region of the Interior of British Columbia, Canada. It is named after James Sheridan, the first pre-emptor in the area. It is located 480 km north of Vancouver, around 160 km northwest of Kamloops and 33 km east of 100 Mile House in the Interlakes District. The Little Fort Highway (BC Highway 24) is just north of the lake. It and its neighbours Bridge Lake and Lac des Roches are the largest lakes along the Interlakes Highway.

== Recreation ==
The lake is popular for fishing, boating, swimming, and winter sports. The lake is stocked with Rainbow Trout and also has native populations of Brook Trout. There are several commercial resort operators on or near the lake.

== See also ==
- List of lakes of British Columbia
