= Green Lake Provincial Park =

Provincial park in British Columbia, Canada

- IUCN category II (national park)
- Location within British Columbia
- Interactive map of Green Lake Provincial Park
- Location: Lillooet Land District, British Columbia, Canada
- Nearest city: 70 Mile House, BC
- Coordinates: 51°24′34″N 121°11′45″W
- Area: 347 ha (860 acres)
- Established: July 10, 1975
- Governing body: BC Parks

Green Lake Provincial Park is a provincial park in British Columbia, Canada, located around Green Lake in the South Cariboo-Interlakes district just east of 70 Mile House.
