= British Columbia Highway 5 =

Highway in British Columbia, Canada

Highway 5
- Southern Yellowhead Highway; Coquihalla Highway
- Highway 5 highlighted in red.

Route information
- Maintained by the Ministry of Transportation and Infrastructure
- Length: 536.66 km (333.47 mi) Coquihalla Highway: 185.55 km (115.30 mi)
- Existed: 1941–present

Major junctions
- South end: Highway 3 near Hope
- Highway 5A / Highway 8 / Highway 97C in Merritt; Highway 1 (TCH) / Highway 97 in Kamloops; Highway 5A in Kamloops; Highway 24 in Little Fort
- North end: Highway 16 (TCH) near Tête Jaune Cache

Location
- Country: Canada
- Province: British Columbia
- Regional districts: Fraser Valley, Thompson-Nicola, Fraser-Fort George
- Major cities: Merritt, Kamloops
- Villages: Valemount

Highway system
- British Columbia provincial highways
← Highway 4	→ Highway 6

Highway 5 is a 543-kilometre (337 mi) north–south route in southern British Columbia, Canada. Highway 5 connects the southern Trans-Canada route (Highway 1) with the northern Trans-Canada/Yellowhead route (Highway 16), providing the shortest land connection between Vancouver, British Columbia, and Edmonton, Alberta. Despite the entire route being signed as part of the Yellowhead Highway, the portion of Highway 5 south of Kamloops is also known as the Coquihalla Highway, while the northern portion is known as the Southern Yellowhead Highway. The Coquihalla section was a toll road until 2008.

Although the Yellowhead Highway system is considered part of the Trans-Canada Highway, Highway 5 is not represented with a Trans-Canada marker. Regardless, Highway 5 is designated as a core route of Canada's National Highway System (NHS).

== Route description ==
=== Coquihalla Highway ===
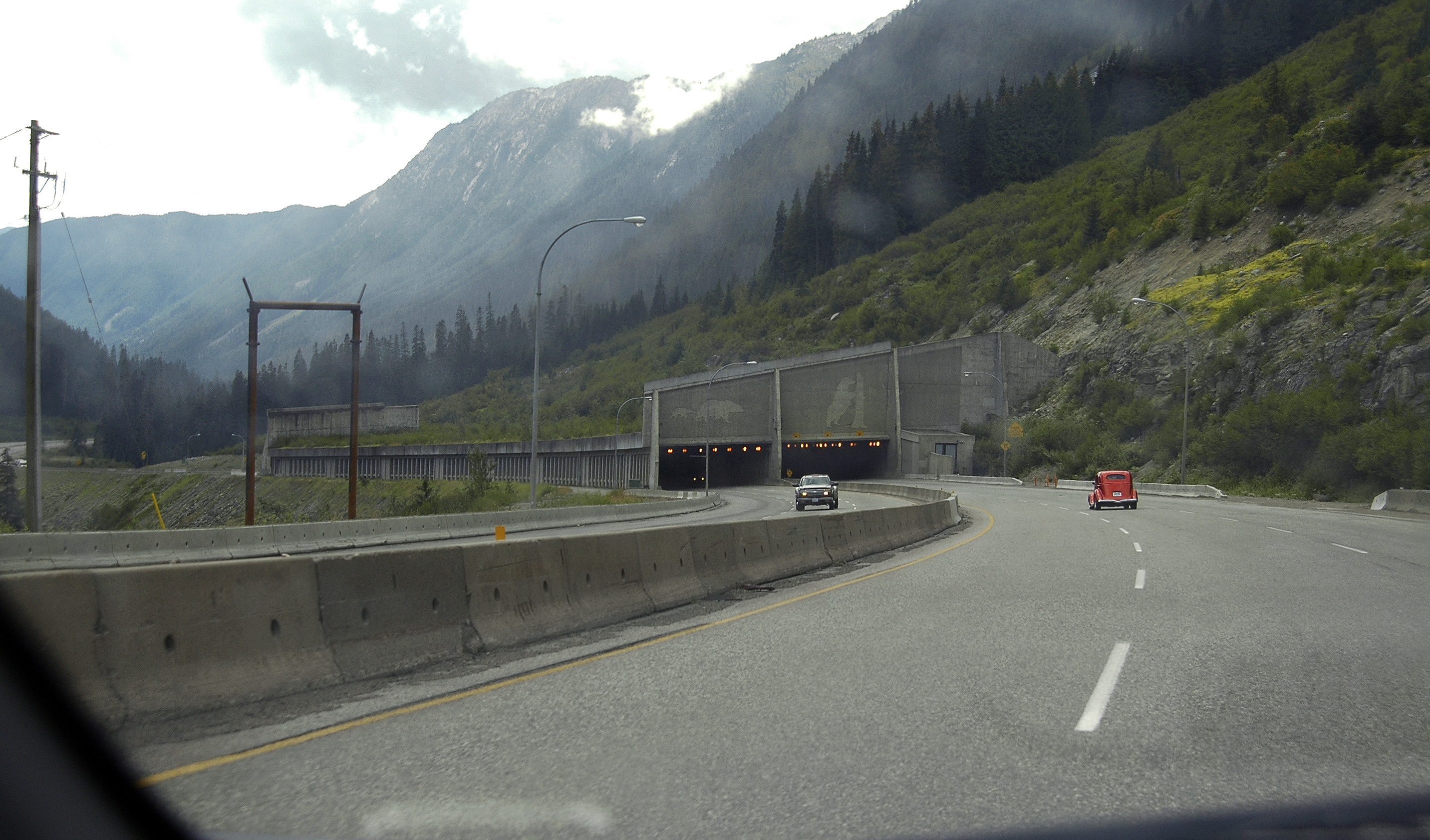
Great Bear Snowshed (2007)

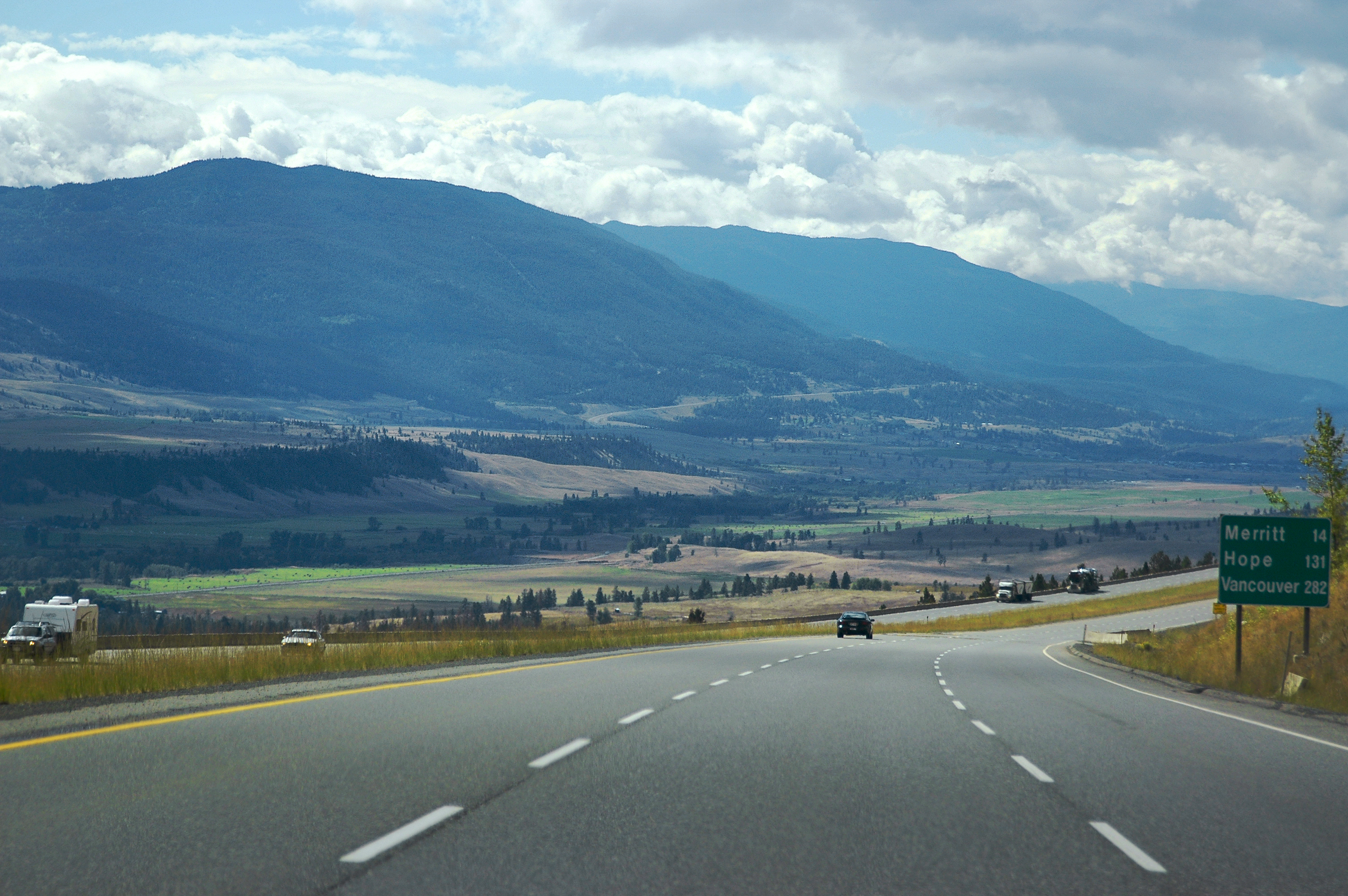
BC Highway 5 Nicola Valley (2007)

Between Hope and Kamloops, Highway 5 is known as the "Coquihalla Highway" (colloquially "the Coq", pronounced "coke"). It is a 186-kilometre (116 mi) freeway, varying between four and six lanes with a speed limit of 120 kilometres per hour (75 miles per hour) for most of its length. The Coquihalla approximately traces through the Cascade Mountains the route of the former Kettle Valley Railway, which existed between 1912 and 1958. It is so named because near Hope, it generally follows the Coquihalla River, for about 60 kilometres (37 mi), and uses the Coquihalla Pass. The pass is named Kwʼikwʼiya꞉la in the Halq̓eméylem language used by the Stó꞉lō, which means "stingy container" and refers specifically to a fishing rock near the mouth of what is now known as the Coquihalla River. According to Stó꞉lō oral history, the skw'exweq (water babies, underwater people) who inhabit a pool close to the rock would swim out and pull the salmon off the spears, allowing only certain fisherman to catch the salmon." Many place names along the route use names of characters from works by William Shakespeare that originated during the construction of the nearby Kettle Valley Railway.

Highway 5 begins south at the junction with the Crowsnest Highway (Highway 3) at uninhabited Othello, seven kilometres (4.3 mi) east of Hope (named after a nearby siding on the Kettle Valley Railway, which used many Shakespearean names). Exit numbers on the Coquihalla are a continuation of those on Highway 1 west of Hope, as it is an extension of the freeway that starts in Horseshoe Bay. 35 kilometres (22 mi) north of Othello, after passing through five interchanges, Highway 5 reaches the landmark Great Bear snow shed. The location of the former toll booth is thirteen kilometres (8.1 mi) north of the snow shed, passing through another interchange and the 1,244-metre (4,081 ft) Coquihalla Pass. Highway 5 is the only highway in British Columbia to have had tolls; a typical passenger vehicle toll was $10. Now free to drive, at the Coquihalla Lakes junction, the highway crosses from the Fraser Valley Regional District into the Thompson-Nicola Regional District. 61 kilometres (38 mi) and five interchanges north of the former toll plaza. The Coquihalla Highway then enters the city of Merritt, which is accessed by two interchanges, both of which also provide access to Highway 5A, Highway 97C, and Highway 8.

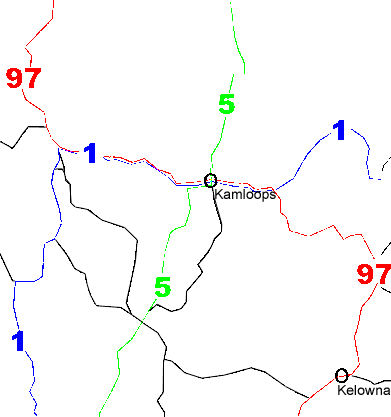
This diagram illustrates the wrong-way concurrency between Highways 5 and 97 through Kamloops.

The section of highway, between Merritt and Kamloops, is 72 kilometres (45 mi) long. After exiting Merritt, the highway climbs up a long, steep hill toward another high point, the Surrey Lake Summit. It passes through three interchanges along this section. A diamond interchange at Exit 336 provides an important turnoff to Logan Lake on Highway 97D and Lac le Jeune. Shortly after the junction, the highway descends into the city of Kamloops, where it meets Highways 1 and 97 at a trumpet interchange; it marks the northern terminus of the "Coquihalla Highway" designation.

=== Kamloops ===
Highway 5 continues east for twelve kilometres (7.5 mi), concurrently with Highways 1 and 97, through Kamloops. This stretch of road, which carries 97 South and 5 North on the same lanes (and vice versa), is the only wrong-way concurrency in British Columbia. This section is mostly an urban freeway with a speed limit of 100 km/h (62 mph). It passes through five interchanges, connecting to the core area of Kamloops, before the concurrency splits and Highway 5 exits off the road to the north in a complex five-way interchange.

After separating from Highways 1 and 97, Highway 5 proceeds north for approximately 19 kilometres (12 mi). For most of this section, it is a four-lane divided highway with several signalized intersections and a speed limit of 80 km/h (50 mph). After leaving the concurrency it immediately crosses the South Thompson River and enters a First Nations Reserve, temporarily leaving Kamloops city limits. A particularly important intersection is the signal lights at Halston Drive, which is one of only two access points to the north half of Kamloops. Highway 5 re-enters the city at the Rayleigh community, where it passes two busy at-grade, but not signalized intersections; traffic volumes steadily decrease as it gets farther from the core area of Kamloops. Heffley Creek indicates the northern boundary of Kamloops; the exit to Sun Peaks resort is at the same turnoff. Traffic volumes thin out at that exit, and shortly afterward Highway 5 narrows to a two-lane undivided road.

=== Southern Yellowhead Highway ===
The "Southern Yellowhead Highway" is the northern section of Highway 5. This section is 314 kilometres (195 mi) long. It is largely a two-lane, undivided highway, with some rare three- or four-lane sections for passing, although work has been constantly underway (especially in the Heffley Creek–Clearwater section) to create more passing opportunities. The speed limit is 100 km/h (62 mph) for the most part except in towns, where it can drop as low as 50 km/h (31 mph). Traffic volume on this section of highway is low compared to the Coquihalla and Kamloops sections of Highway 5. In its whole length there is only one traffic signal, which is in the town of Valemount. Services for drivers are provided in the major towns.

Highway 5 follows the North Thompson River north from Kamloops and Heffley Creek for approximately 54 kilometres (34 mi), along a parallel course with the Canadian National Railway's main line. It passes an important junction for Adams Lake in the settlement of Louis Creek before entering the town Barriere. North of Barriere, it encounters a junction with Highway 24 in the village of Little Fort. 30 kilometres (19 mi) north of Little Fort, while continuing to follow the North Thompson and the CN Railway, Highway 5 reaches the resort community of Clearwater, where a roundabout provides access to Wells Gray Provincial Park. Highway 5 proceeds northeast for another 107 kilometres (66 mi), passing Vavenby and Avola en route to the community of Blue River, a popular heliskiing location. From there, it proceeds 109 kilometres (68 mi) farther north through the heart of the Columbia Mountains. It crosses a low divide between the Thompson River and Fraser River drainages, entering the Regional District of Fraser-Fort George. It soon passes through the community of Valemount, where a traffic signal is located. Next it passes Tête Jaune Cache and crosses the Fraser River, after which it immediately meets Highway 16 in a partial interchange, marking its northern terminus.

== History ==
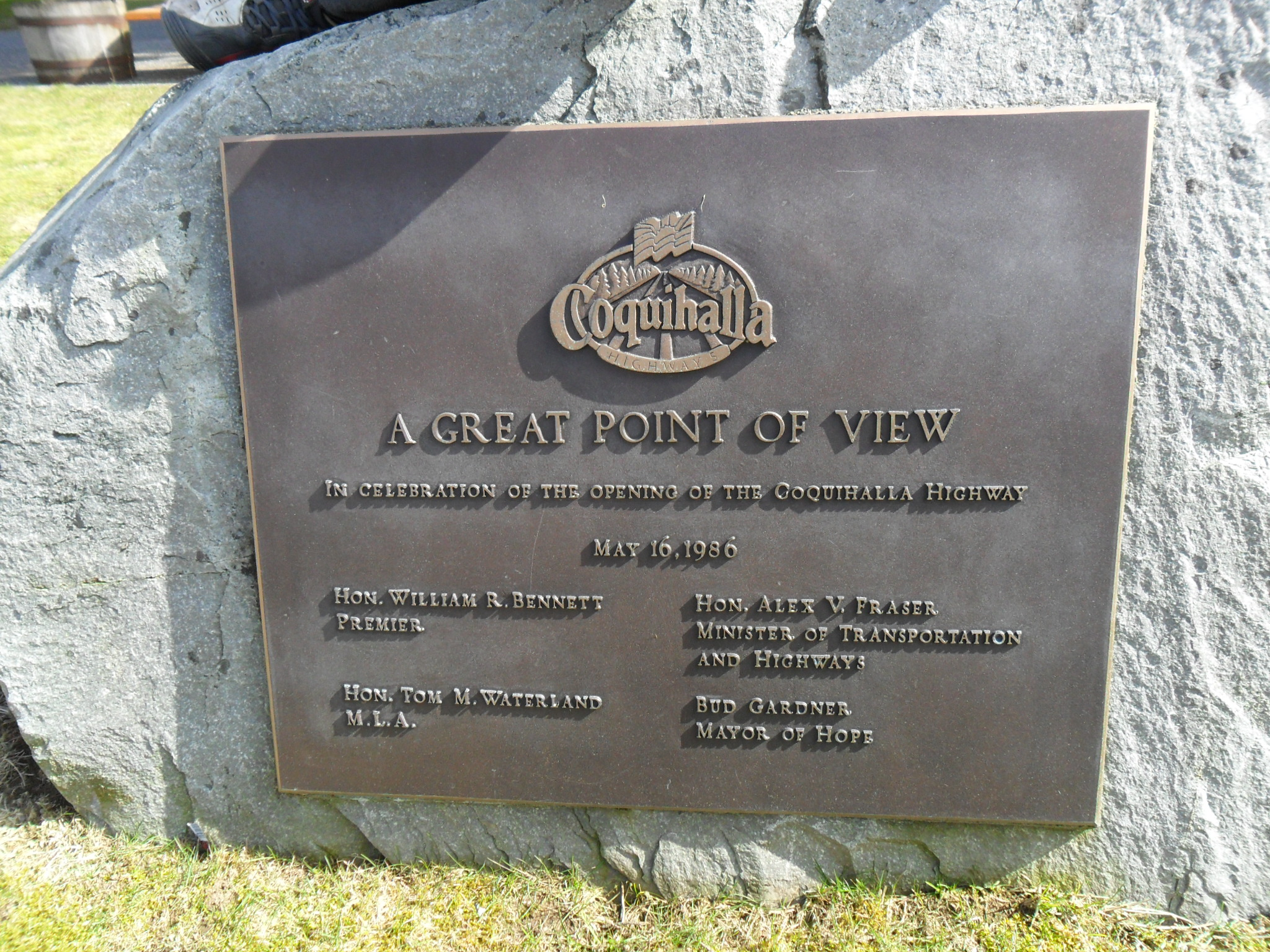
A plaque commemorating the opening of the Coquihalla Highway in Hope, British Columbia.

Coquihalla Highway marker (1986–2011)

The current Highway 5 is not the first highway in B.C. to have this designation. From 1941 to 1953, the section of present-day Highway 97, Highway 97A, and Highway 97B, between Kaleden, just south of Penticton, and Salmon Arm, was formerly Highway 5. In 1953, the '5' designation was moved to designate Princeton-Merritt-Kamloops Highway (present-day Highway 5A) to north of Kamloops; by 1960, Highway 5 was extended north to Tête Jaune Cache and subsequently paved. In 1970, Highway 5 between Kamloops and Tête Jaune Cache was designated as the "South Yellowhead Highway" and signed with the Yellowhead Highway shield, while the section south of Kamloops was still signed with the standard British Columbia highway shield.

In the 1960s, the Merritt Board of Trade began lobbying the B.C. government for a new highway route to Hope, including a vehicle caravan that was staged eight times starting in 1963, over the abandoned Kettle Valley Railway grade, in order draw attention to the potential of this route. Surveying commenced in 1973, and in 1979 the first construction contract was issued for a 4.5-kilometre (2.8 mi) section of highway between Nicolum Creek and Peers Creek near Hope; however, work progressed slowly until 1984, when Premier Bill Bennett announced that the project would be fast-tracked so it could be completed to coincide with Expo 86. To ensure the project was completed on time, more than 10,000 workers were needed, and more than 1,000 pieces of heavy equipment worked non-stop every day during the summer of 1985. The project was divided into three phases, with Phase 1 being the 115-kilometre (71 mi) section between Hope and Merritt, Phase 2 being the 80-kilometre (50 mi) section between Merritt and Kamloops, and Phase 3 being a 108-kilometre (67 mi) branch between Merritt and Peachland, south of Kelowna. To offset the cost of fast-tracking construction, Phase 1 was made a toll highway, with a toll plaza constructed at the summit of Coquihalla Summit; it was designed to accommodate 13 toll booths for 14 lanes of traffic.

On May 16, 1986, Phase 1 was officially opened, and Highway 5 was re-routed between Hope and Merritt; its construction required 31 bridges and underpasses and over 3.7 million tonnes (4,100,000 short tons) of gravel. The opening celebrations featured a ceremony in Hope followed by a convoy led by Premier Bennett in an open-air convertible that smashed through paper banners strung across the new highway lanes, stopped at the Coquihalla Summit to dedicate a time capsule, and continued to Merritt for further celebrations. The total cost for the highway between Hope and Merritt was approximately $848 million. Phase 2, between Merritt and Kamloops, opened in September 1987, re-routing Highway 5, while Phase 3 was opened in October 1990 and designated as Highway 97C. The three phases have been credited with transforming Merritt into an important transportation hub between the coast and interior, as well as significant growth in both Kamloops and the Okanagan due to improved accessibility.

In 2003, Premier Gordon Campbell announced the Liberal government would turn over toll revenue to a private operator, along with responsibility for the operation and maintenance of the Coquihalla Highway. In response to strong opposition from the public and numerous businesses in the Interior of British Columbia, the provincial government shelved the move three months later.

On September 26, 2008, the provincial government permanently lifted the Coquihalla tolls, effective 1 pm that day. Subsequently, the toll station and signs were dismantled.

In 2011, the British Columbia government replaced the standard British Columbia Highway 5 shields with Yellowhead Highway 5 shields south of Kamloops, which at the time drew some concern that the Coquihalla Highway would be officially renamed.

Effective July 2, 2014, the Ministry of Transport and Infrastructure increased the speed limit on the Coquihalla Highway from 110 to 120 km/h (68 to 75 mph) after conducting an engineering assessment and province-wide speed review. In June 2016, the province implemented a variable speed limit corridor around the Coquihalla Summit Park to increase safety during adverse conditions.

== Accidents and weather ==
Signs along the Coquihalla Highway frequently warn drivers to be aware of sudden changes in weather. The highway is particularly dangerous during winter seasons, with extreme snowfall that can exceed more than 10 centimetres (4 in) per hour. While road maintenance strives to keep the roads as clear as possible, it is not unheard of for the highway to shut down, sometimes with travellers forced to stay overnight in their cars.

According to ICBC, there were 32 fatal crashes between 2004 and 2013, and an estimated 400–500 accidents occur during the winter seasons. Global News listed the stretch between Merritt and Hope as one of the deadliest highways in BC. DriveBC provides up-to-date reports on Coquihalla Highway conditions, including live webcams in several locations.

Owing to its reputation, Highway 5 is featured predominantly in the reality docuseries Highway Thru Hell, which follows a group of towing companies that operate in the Interior and Highway 5.

On November 14, 2021, a major storm in southern British Columbia damaged sections of the Coquihalla Highway and other routes in the area. Over the course of November 14 and 15, 200 millimetres (7.9 in) of rain fell along the Coquihalla route. The heavy rain eventually caused several large washouts at multiple points along the highway, including the destruction of multiple bridges. Initial repair estimates included temporary reopenings consisting of temporary bridges, operational for early 2022, with full repair completed in September 2022. After the washouts, Canadian Forces Cormorant helicopters evacuated stranded motorists on the highway. On December 20, the Coquihalla Highway was reopened to essential traffic, with non-essential traffic being diverted toward Highway 99. On January 19, 2022, the Coquihalla Highway was reopened to non-essential traffic from Hope to Merritt. The highway has since been fully reopened, allowing full traffic from Hope to Kamloops.

== Exit list ==
From south to north, the following intersections are observed along Highway 5:

Regional District	Location	km	mi	Exit	Destinations	Notes
Fraser Valley	Hope	−6.67	−4.14	—	Highway 1 (TCH) west – Vancouver	Freeway and exit numbers continue west
Fraser Valley	Hope	−6.67	−4.14	170	Highway 1 (TCH) east / Highway 3 begins – Hope, Cache Creek, Prince George	Hope Interchange; Highway 3 western terminus; eastbound exit and westbound entrance
Fraser Valley	Hope	−5.68	−3.53	171	To Highway 1 (TCH) east – Hope, Cache Creek	Westbound exit only
Fraser Valley	Hope	−3.59	−2.23	173	Old Hope-Princeton Way (Highway 901:0694 west) – Hope	Thacker Creek Interchange; no westbound entrance; access from Highway 1 west
Fraser Valley		0.00	0.00	177	Highway 3 east (Crowsnest Highway) – Princeton, Penticton, Osoyoos	Othello Interchange; Highway 5 southern terminus; south end of Coquihalla Highway
Fraser Valley		6.33	3.93	183	Othello Road – Coquihalla Canyon Provincial Park	Peers Creek Interchange
Fraser Valley		15.35	9.54	192	Sowaqua Creek	Jessica Interchange
Fraser Valley		19.10	11.87	195	Carolin Mines Road (U-turn route)	
Fraser Valley		23.01	14.30	200	Shylock Road (U-turn route only)	Southbound exit and northbound entrance
Fraser Valley		24.52	15.24	202	Portia (U-turn route)	No southbound exit
Fraser Valley		35.54	22.08	Great Bear Snowshed		
Fraser Valley		38.86	24.15	217	Zopkios rest area	
Fraser Valley		48.93	30.40	Coquihalla Pass – 1,244 m (4,081 ft)		
Fraser Valley		44.68	27.76	221	Falls Lake	
Fraser Valley		45.55	28.30	Dry Gulch Bridge		
Fraser Valley		47.83	29.72	Coquihalla Lakes Rest Area (former site of toll booths)		
Thompson-Nicola		51.44	31.96	228	Coquihalla Lakes Road – Britton Creek Rest Area	
Thompson-Nicola		54.42	33.82	231	Mine Creek Road (U-turn route only)	Southbound exit and northbound entrance
Thompson-Nicola		54.53	33.88	238	Juliet Creek Road – Coldwater River Provincial Park	
Thompson-Nicola		73.02	45.37	250	Larson Hill	
Thompson-Nicola		79.79	49.58	256	Coldwater Road (U-turn Route)	Kingsvale Interchange
Thompson-Nicola		99.65	61.92	276	Comstock Road	
Thompson-Nicola	Merritt	109.32	67.93	286	Highway 97C / Highway 5A south / Highway 8 west (Nicola Avenue) – Merritt City Centre, Kelowna	Coldwater Interchange
Thompson-Nicola	Merritt	113.29	70.40	290	Highway 5A north / Voght Street – Merritt City Centre	Nicola Interchange
Thompson-Nicola		138.64	86.15	315	Helmer Road	
Thompson-Nicola		145.93	90.68	Surrey Lake Summit – 1,444 m (4,738 ft)		
Thompson-Nicola		160.44	99.69	336	Highway 97D south / Lac Le Jeune Road (Highway 906:0923 north) – Logan Lake	Walloper Interchange; signed as Highway 97D south but should be Highway 97D west
Thompson-Nicola		178.81	111.11	355	Inks Lake Road	
Thompson-Nicola	Kamloops	185.55	115.30	362	Highway 1 (TCH) west / Highway 97 north to Highway 99 – Cache Creek, Lytton, Prince George, Lillooet	Afton Interchange; south end of Highway 1 / Highway 97 concurrency; north end of Coquihalla Highway
Thompson-Nicola	Kamloops	189.78	117.92	366	Copperhead Drive / Lac le Jeune Road	Copperhead interchange; to Highway 906:0923 south
Thompson-Nicola	Kamloops	191.46	118.97	367	Pacific Way	Pacific Way interchange
Thompson-Nicola	Kamloops	192.25	119.46	368	Highway 5A south / Hillside Way – Merritt	Aberdeen Interchange
Thompson-Nicola	Kamloops	193.55	120.27	369	Columbia Street – City Centre	Sagebrush Interchange; northbound exit and southbound entrance
Thompson-Nicola	Kamloops	194.13	120.63	370	Summit Drive – City Centre	Springhill Interchange; southbound exit and northbound entrance
Thompson-Nicola	Kamloops	197.62	122.80	374	Highway 1 (TCH) east / Highway 97 south – Salmon Arm, Banff, Vernon	Yellowhead Interchange; north end of Highway 1 / Highway 97 concurrency; Highway 5 exits freeway; exit numbers continue on Highway 1
Thompson-Nicola	Kamloops–Kamloops 1 boundary	198.07	123.07	Yellowhead Bridge over South Thompson River		
Thompson-Nicola	Kamloops 1	199.42	123.91		Shuswap Road	
Thompson-Nicola	Kamloops 1	201.49	125.20		Mount Paul Way	
Thompson-Nicola	Kamloops 1	203.37	126.37		Halston Road (Highway 906:1771 west) / Paul Lake Road (Highway 906:1777 east) – North Shore, Kamloops Airport	
Thompson-Nicola	Kamloops	222.07	137.99		Old Highway 5 – Heffley Creek, Sun Peaks	To Highway 906:1776
Thompson-Nicola	Barriere	260.97	162.16		Barriere Town Road / Lilley Road	
Thompson-Nicola	Barriere	263.39	163.66	Barriere North Thompson Bridge across North Thompson River		
Thompson-Nicola	Little Fort	291.21	180.95		Highway 24 west – Bridge Lake	
Thompson-Nicola		313.19	194.61		Old North Thompson Highway (Highway 906:1766 north)	
Thompson-Nicola	Clearwater	320.37	199.07		Old North Thompson Highway / Clearwater Village Road	To Highway 906:1766 south
Thompson-Nicola	Clearwater	321.41	199.71		Clearwater Valley Road / Park Drive – Wells Gray Provincial Park	Roundabout
Thompson-Nicola	Avola	388.76	241.56	Avola North Thompson Bridge across North Thompson River		
Thompson-Nicola		417.01	259.12	Six Mile Bridge across North Thompson River		
Thompson-Nicola	Blue River	427.76	265.80			
Thompson-Nicola		467.73	290.63	Lempriere Bridge across North Thompson River		
Thompson-Nicola		470.67	292.46	Moombeam Bridge across North Thompson River		
Thompson-Nicola		472.24	293.44	Gosnell Bridge across North Thompson River		
Fraser-Fort George	Valemount	517.27	321.42		5th Avenue / Pine Road	
Fraser-Fort George	Tête Jaune Cache	536.46	333.34	Tête Jaune Bridge across Fraser River		
Fraser-Fort George	Tête Jaune Cache	536.66	333.47	—	Highway 16 (TCH/YH) – McBride, Prince George, Jasper, Edmonton	Tête Jaune Interchange; Highway 5 northern terminus
1.000 mi = 1.609 km; 1.000 km = 0.621 mi: Concurrency terminus; Incomplete access; Route transition

== Gallery ==
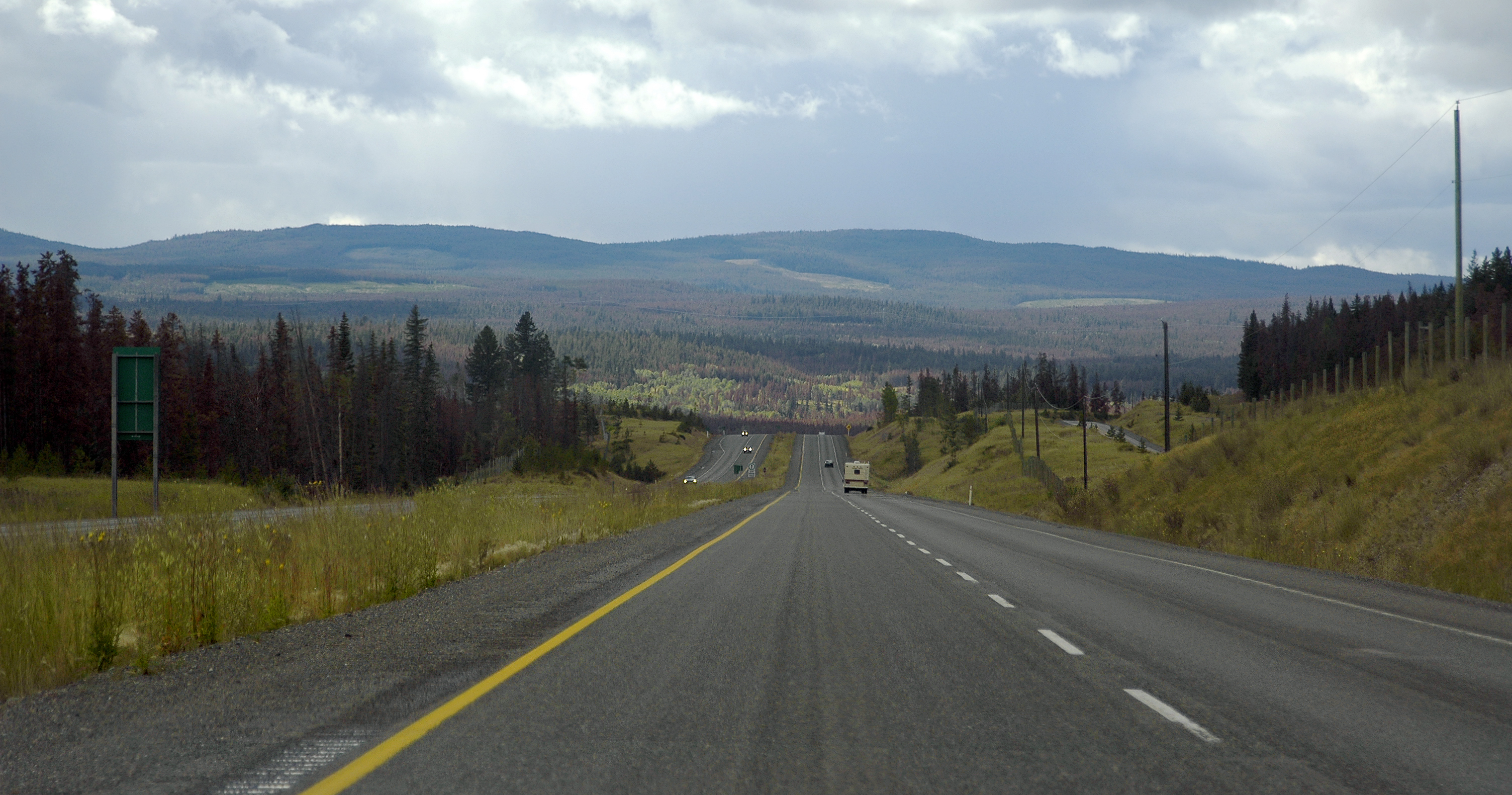
Highway 5 passing through Thompson Plateau, with tree damage from Pine Beetles visible (2007)

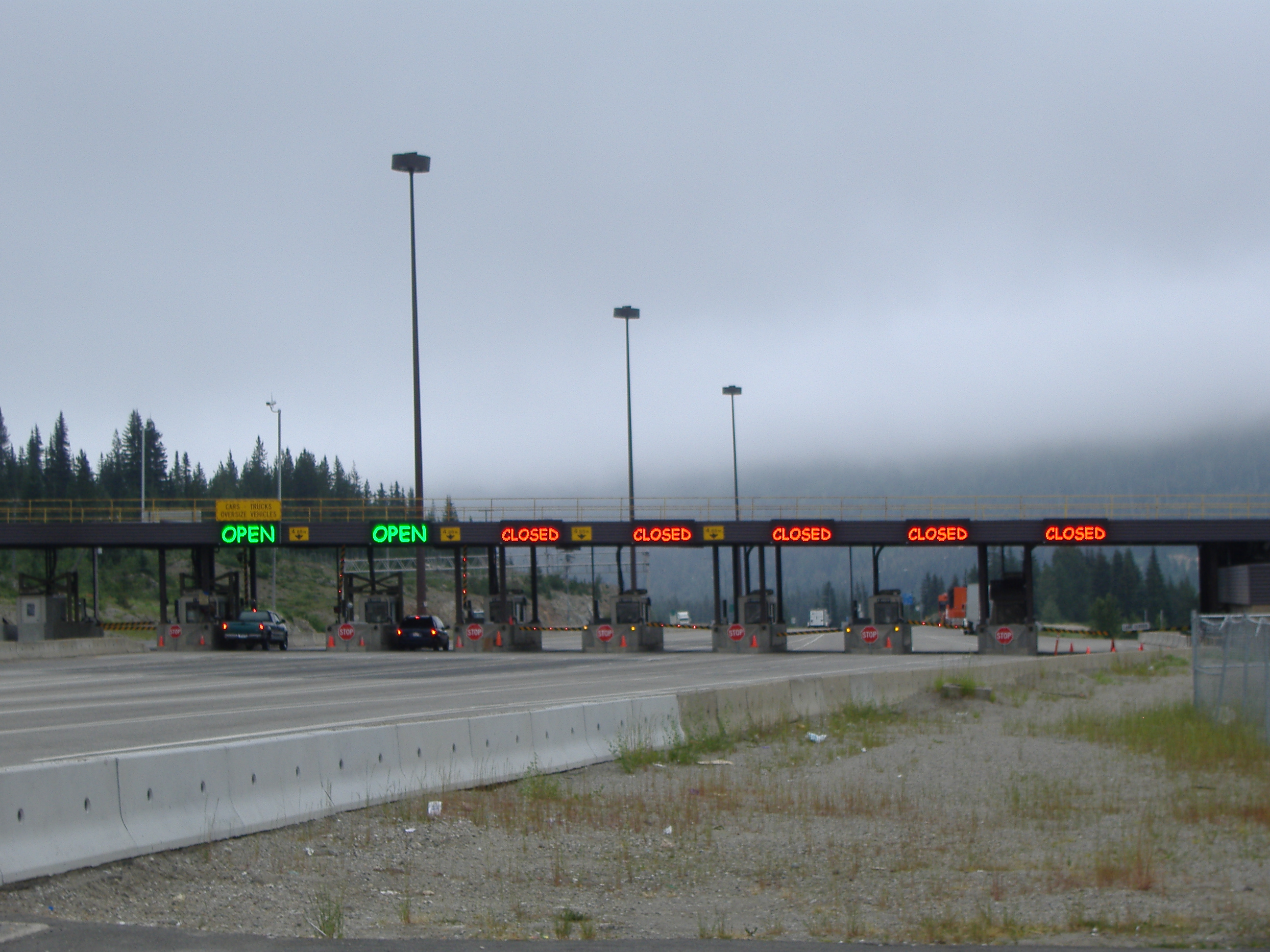
The toll booth once marked the halfway point of the formerly tolled Hope-to-Merritt portion of the highway (2006)

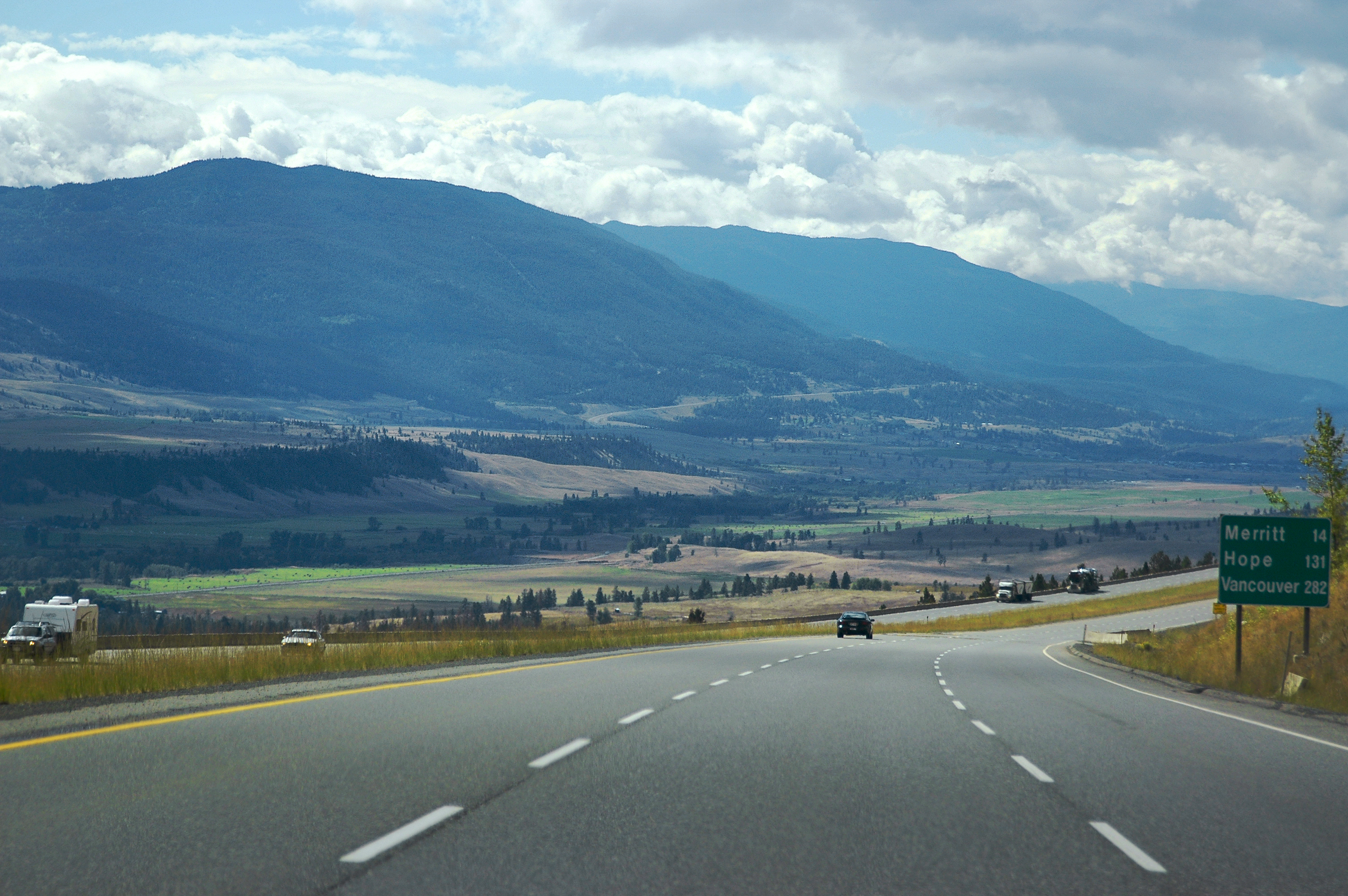
Passing Nicola Valley southbound (2007)

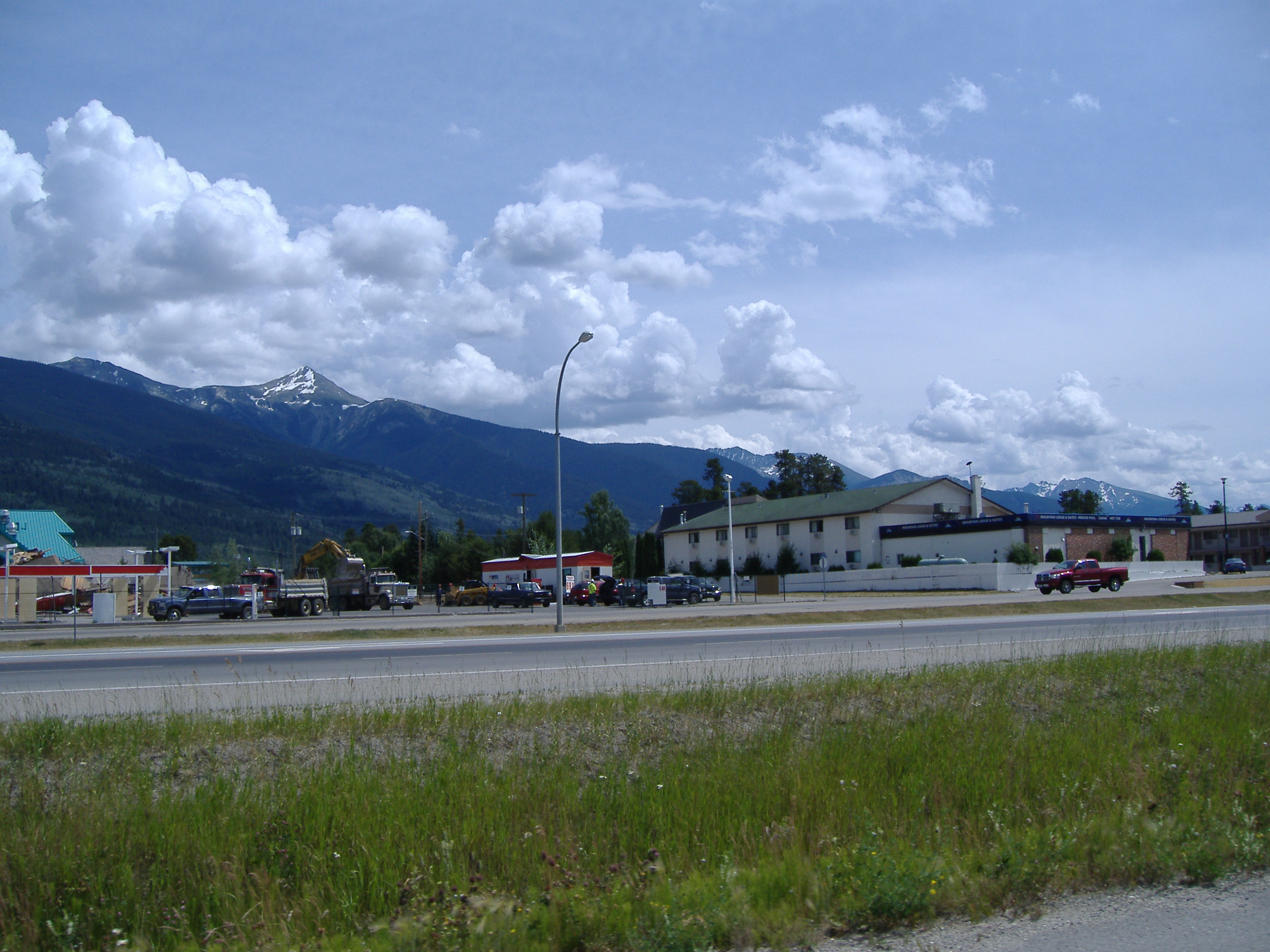
Downtown Valemount as seen from the west side of Highway 5 (2006)

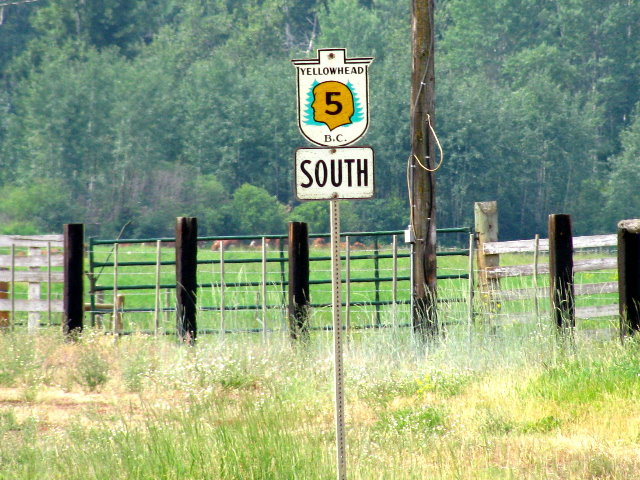
Southern Yellowhead Highway 5, southbound (2008)
