= Lone Butte =

Lone Butte can refer to one of:

- Lone Butte (Colorado), a mesa in Las Animas County, Colorado, United States
- Lone Butte (Washington), a volcano in Washington, United States
- Lone Butte (British Columbia), a volcano in British Columbia, Canada
- Lone Butte, British Columbia, an unincorporated community in British Columbia adjacent to the volcano.
