= Bridge Creek (British Columbia) =

River in Canada

Coordinates: 51°46′00″N 120°54′00″W

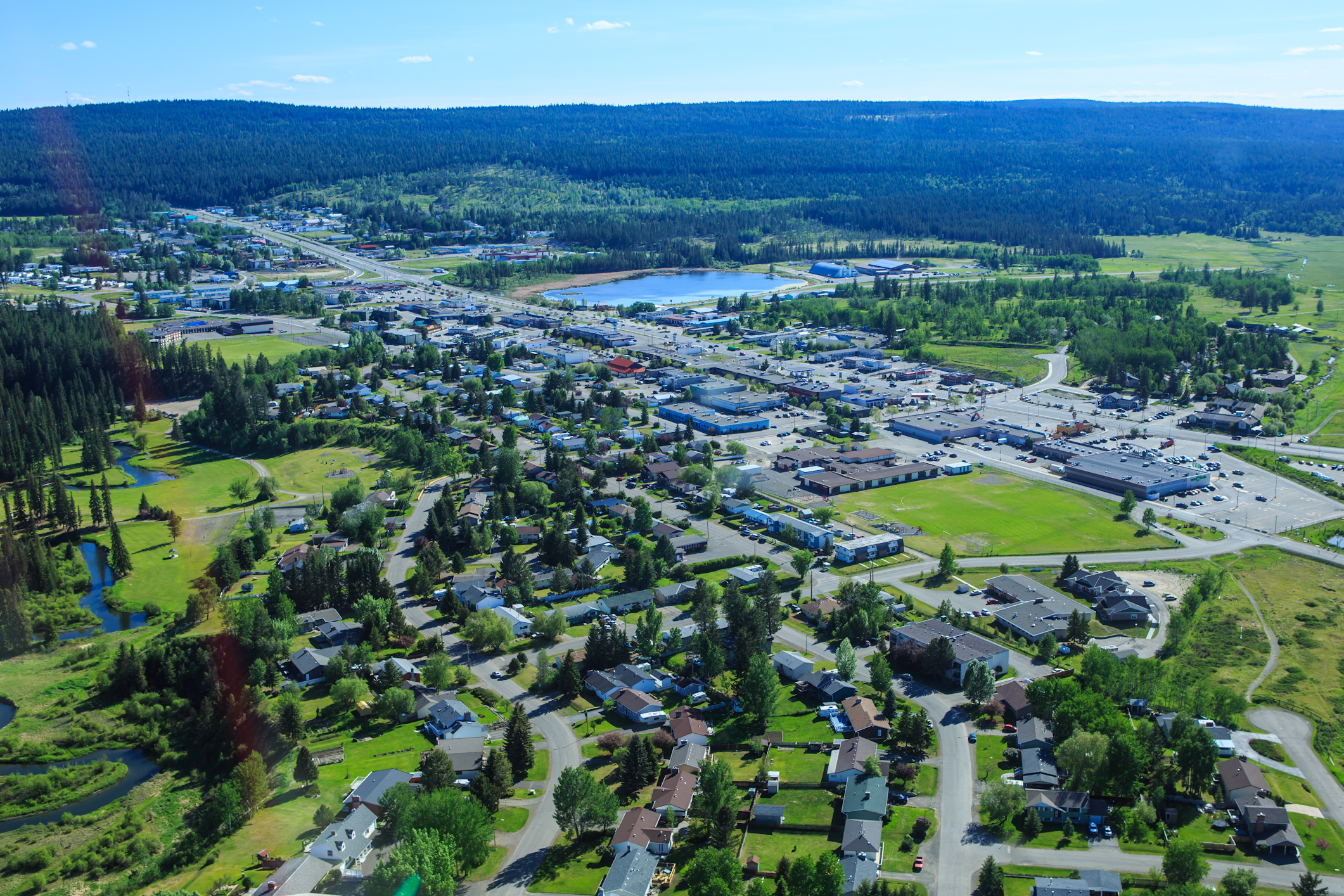
An aerial view of the town of 100 Mile House along Bridge Creek in British Columbia

Bridge Creek is a creek in the South Cariboo region of the Interior of British Columbia, Canada. Its meandering course across the Cariboo Plateau is approximately 85 kilometres in length, beginning at Bridge Lake and running roughly westwards to the town of 100 Mile House (originally named Bridge Creek House) and from there turning and running northeast to Canim Lake (British Columbia). Below Canim Lake the Canim River connects to Mahood Lake and the short Mahood River to the Clearwater River, which meets the North Thompson at the town of Clearwater.

The Canim and Mahood Rivers were originally named as part of Bridge Creek, but in 1941 they were renamed and the name Bridge Creek only refers to the part of the watercourse upstream from (and west of) Canim Lake. Bridge Lake and others in this area are part of a region known as the Interlakes or Interlakes District.

Bridge Creek should not be confused with the Bridge River, which is a tributary of the Fraser and lies on the other side of that river from the Cariboo.

== See also ==
- List of rivers of British Columbia
