= Mahood River =

Coordinates: 51°54′58″N 120°11′39″W

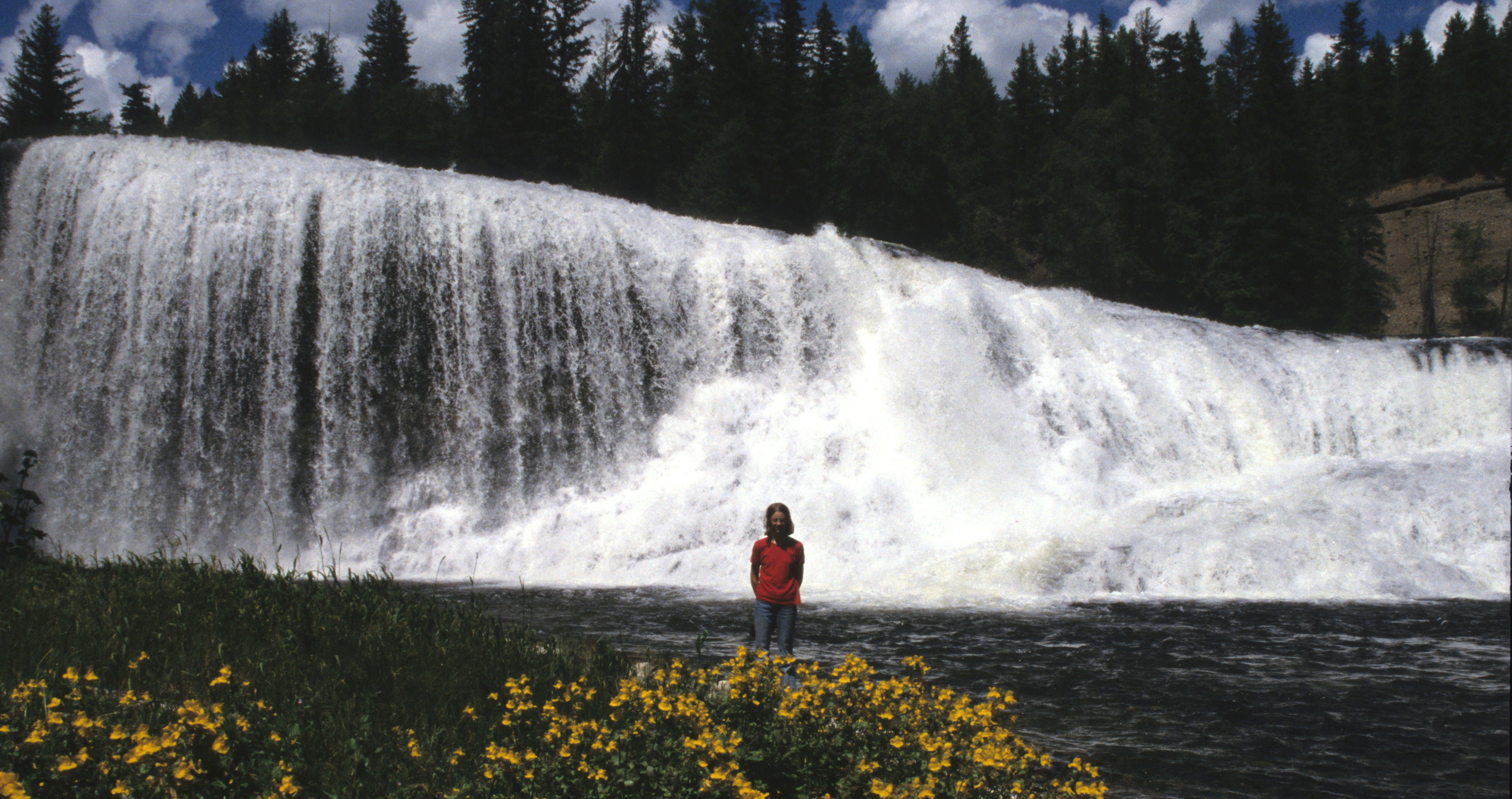
Sylvia Falls on Mahood River

The Mahood River is a river in the northern Shuswap Highland of the Central Interior of British Columbia in Wells Gray Provincial Park. It is 7 kilometres (4.3 mi) long from its source at Mahood Lake to its confluence with the Clearwater River, a tributary of the North Thompson River. The Mahood River has cut a deep canyon into Cambrian rocks and Pleistocene glacial moraines.

The Mahood River drops over two waterfalls. Sylvia Falls is 20 metres (66 ft) high and 90 metres (295 ft) wide and cascades across a glacial moraine. The falls is noticeably eroding upstream and changing its appearance faster than other waterfalls in the park, since glacial deposits are fairly soft. Only 100 metres (328 ft) downstream is Goodwin Falls which is 10 metres (33 ft) high and 60 metres (197 ft) wide.

== Origin of names ==
Nearby Mahood Lake and, later, the Mahood Falls community were named after James Adam Mahood who was in charge of a Canadian Pacific Railway survey in this area in 1872. The Mahood River and the Canim River, which feeds Mahood Lake from Canim Lake, were both originally named as part of Bridge Creek. They were renamed in 1941 and the name 'Bridge Creek' was retained only for the stream that flows into Canim Lake.

Both Sylvia Falls and Goodwin Falls were named by photographer and author, Chess Lyons. In 1940, six months after Wells Gray Park was created, he was assigned by the B.C. Forest Service to explore and map the area. The Minister of Lands, Hon. Arthur Wellesley Gray, presented Lyons with a list of friends he wanted used in the naming of places in the park. Lyons thought this was inappropriate because he believed that place names should honor people who had been directly involved with the park such as pioneers, prospectors and trappers. However, orders had to be obeyed, so each time he passed a swamp, he dutifully assigned one of Gray’s names. However, each time he came upon a sizable creek, a waterfall or a peak he pulled his own carefully researched list from his backpack. Needless to say, Gray’s names have been lost to time, except for one - Goodwin Falls. Thirty years after his survey, Lyons commented to Helen and Philip Akrigg (British Columbia’s place name experts), "I had to hang a few names on, and Goodwin was some friend of Wells Gray. I think that was the most prominent thing named in the Park because I figured I would lead him astray with one thing while I named little insignificant things after the others that would all be forgotten. I have no idea who Goodwin was." For many years, the origin of the Goodwin Falls name did remain a mystery and neither the B.C. Provincial Archives nor the Geographical Names Office could provide any clue about Goodwin. The puzzle was eventually solved by the Akriggs who learned from Gray’s niece that Walter Goodwin was a Spokane, Washington, dentist who had done some work on Gray's teeth the year before. By this chance association, he became memorialized in Wells Gray Park. The only other exception to Lyons' list of locals was Sylvia Falls which he named for his wife.

== Access ==
A rough road from Clearwater on the Yellowhead Highway follows the west bank of the Clearwater River for 38.5 kilometres (23.9 mi) and ends at the confluence of the Mahood River and Clearwater River. It has been closed since July 2020 when the Clearwater River washed out the road at km 11.4 and the government is still reviewing the feasibility of repairs and costs. The road is currently accessible only to hikers and mountain bikers. A primitive campsite is located at the end of the road at Mahood River. A trail follows the south bank of the Mahood River upstream for 4 kilometres (2.5 mi) to Sylvia and Goodwin Falls, about a one-hour walk. The trail, in poor condition, continues on to Mahood Lake, a hike of 3 kilometres (1.9 mi) that takes about 1.5 hours. The only other access to Mahood River is by boat from Mahood Lake Campground at the west end.

== See also ==
- List of rivers of British Columbia
- Interlakes
- Mahood Lake for more about James Adam Mahood's survey expedition
