= Bridge Lake (British Columbia) =

Lake in British Columbia, Canada

- Location within British Columbia
- Location: Cariboo Country, British Columbia
- Coordinates: 51°30′16.2″N 120°43′26.1″W
- Primary outflows: Bridge Creek
- Catchment area: 158 km^{2} (61 sq mi)
- Basin countries: Canada
- Max. length: 7.1 km (4.4 mi)
- Surface area: 15 km^{2} (5.8 sq mi)
- Average depth: 17 m (56 ft)
- Max. depth: 47 m (154 ft)
- Residence time: 62.5 years
- Shore length^{1}: 47 km (29 mi)
- Surface elevation: 1,136 m (3,727 ft)
- Islands: Long Island
- Settlements: Bridge Lake
- ^{1} Shore length is not a well-defined measure.

Bridge Lake (historically known as Greater Fish Lake) is a lake in the Interlakes District of the South Cariboo region of the Interior of British Columbia, Canada. It is the source of Bridge Creek which runs in a curving course west and then northeast to Canim Lake via the town of 100 Mile House.

The lake is approximately 16 km^{2} in area (including the area of several islands and islets in the lake, the largest of which is named Long Island and is 1136 m in elevation. It is located 500 km north of Vancouver, around 140 km northwest of Kamloops and 45 km east of 100 Mile House, in the Interlakes District close to the Little Fort Highway (BC Highway 24). It and its neighbours Sheridan Lake and Lac des Roches are the largest lakes along the Interlakes Highway.

The community of Bridge Lake (pop. 500) and Bridge Lake Provincial Park are located at the eastern end of the lake. Just east of Bridge Lake is Lac des Roches while just west of it is Sheridan Lake; the three are the largest lakes in the district between Canim Lake to the north and Bonaparte lake to the southeast. The basin of the Bonaparte River is just south of Bridge Lake, in the form of its tributary the Rayfield River.

== Recreation ==
The lake is popular for fishing, boating, swimming, hiking and winter sports. The lake is stocked with Rainbow Trout and Kokanee and also has native populations of Lake Trout and Burbot. There are numerous access points around the lake, but not all are active. The Bridge Lake Provincial Park campground has 13 campsites, picnic area, a boat launch and short trail. In addition, there are several commercial resort operators on or near the lake.

Trails and recreational opportunities are available at the Bridge Lake Ice Caves regional park located on the south side of the lake.

== See also ==
- List of lakes of British Columbia
- Bridge Creek
