= Lone Butte (British Columbia) =

Butte in British Columbia, Canada

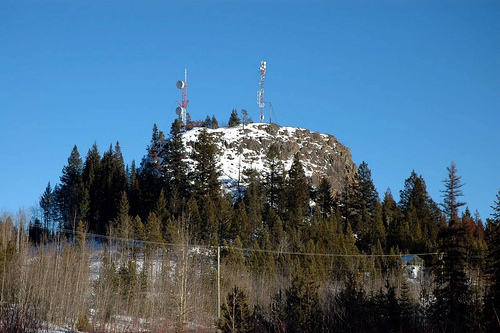

Highest point
- Elevation: 1,237 m (4,058 ft)
- Prominence: 58 m (190 ft)
- Listing: List of volcanoes in Canada
- Coordinates: 51°33′11.9″N 121°11′20.1″W

Geography
- Location within British Columbia
- Interactive map of Lone Butte
- Location: South Cariboo, British Columbia, Canada
- District: Lillooet Land District
- Parent range: Cariboo Plateau
- Topo map: NTS 92P11 100 Mile House

Geology
- Mountain type: Volcanic plug
- Volcanic zone: Chilcotin Group

Lone Butte is a low, steep-sided mesa butte or volcanic plug in southern British Columbia, Canada, located on the southern Cariboo Plateau to the southeast of 100 Mile House. It is composed of columnar basalt that formed within a prehistoric volcano six million years ago. It is part of the geological formation known as the Chilcotin Group, which lies in between the Pacific Ranges of the Coast Mountains and the mid-Fraser River. BCWireless Ltd uses Lone Butte as one of its main access point for Broadband Internet distribution.

== Location and terrain ==
Lone Butte is located 13 km (8 mi) southeast of 100 Mile House and is immediately north of the recreational lake-community of Green Lake. The vertical structure of Lone Butte forms a prominent monument that rises more than 50 m (160 ft) above the surrounding lowlands of the Cariboo Plateau. Its appearance is like a butte-like hillrock, similar to the more famous Devils Tower in Wyoming. The ranching and recreational community of Lone Butte is located on the mountain's north side. There are two communication towers located at the butte; BCWireless on its level summit and Navigata on its eastern flank.

== See also ==
- Lone Butte, British Columbia (community)
- List of volcanoes in Canada
- Volcanism in Canada
