= Sulphurous Lake =

Lake in British Columbia, Canada

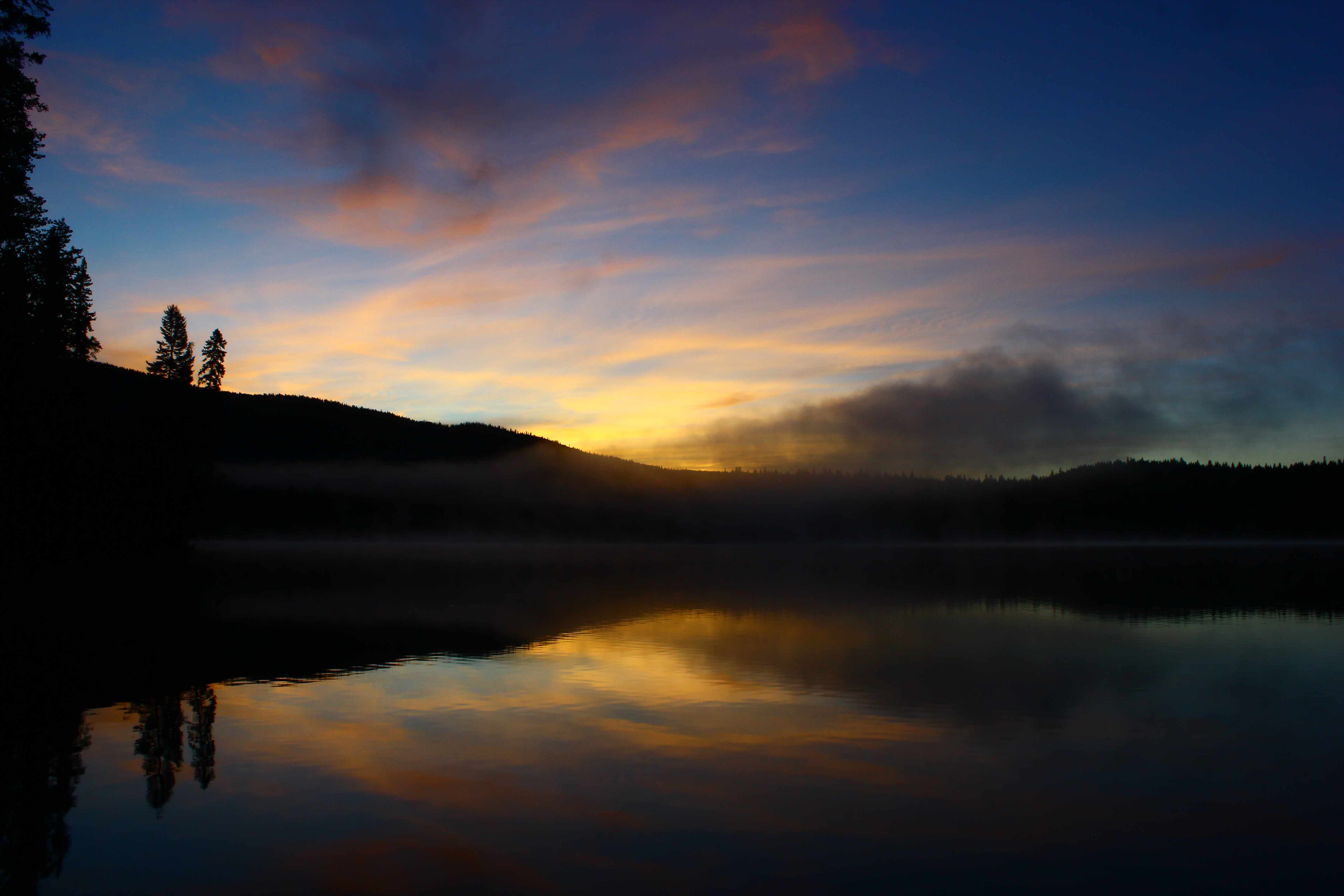
- Sunrise at Sulphurous Lake in September

- Location within British Columbia
- Location: Cariboo, British Columbia
- Coordinates: 51.634°N 120.829°W
- Primary outflows: Deka Lake
- Basin countries: Canada
- Max. length: 6.5 kilometres (4.0 mi)
- Surface area: 380 hectares (940 acres)
- Average depth: 15.4 m (51 ft)
- Max. depth: 46.94 metres (154.0 ft)
- Surface elevation: 1,116 metres (3,661 ft)
- Islands: 1

Sulphurous Lake is a freshwater body in the Cariboo Region of British Columbia, generally considered to be part of the Interlakes area as it is near Deka Lake. The lake has one boat launch for motor boats and one for paddle boats, which is now listed as an official recreation site.

== Recreation & community ==
The lake is the location of the Sulphurous Lake Resort. The Sulphurous Lake Volunteer Fire Department provides fire protection for the cabin community on the north shore of the lake. The fire department hosts an annual fishing derby on the lake. Much of the lake's eastern reach is surrounded by Rainbow/Q'iwentem Provincial Park. A recreation site is now open at the lake's boat launch.

=== Fishing ===
The lake is stocked with Rainbow Trout and Kokanee. Lake trout daily quota is 1 per person. Lake trout are released from October 1-November 30.

== History ==
There was previously a garbage dump located north of the lake on Petty John Road, which is still clearly visible although being reclaimed by nature. The lake got its name because of the two yellow swallow patches. The main boat launch used to be an old sawmill.

== See also ==
- List of lakes of British Columbia
