= 93 Mile House =

- Location of 93 Mile House in British Columbia
- Coordinates: 51°34′00″N 121°20′00″W
- Country: Canada
- Province: British Columbia
- Time zone: UTC−07:00 (PT)
- Area codes: 250, 778

93 Mile House (officially 93 Mile) is an unincorporated community in 100 Mile House (outside edge of) the South Cariboo region of British Columbia, Canada. It is at the junction of Highway 24 and Highway 97. It is located approximately 11 km (7 mi) south of 100 Mile House. 93 Mile House was the name of a roadhouse built to serve travellers on the Cariboo Road during the Cariboo Gold Rush. The name 93 Mile House results from its location at the 93 mile-post from Lillooet on the Old Cariboo Road, which was built to serve travellers bound to the Cariboo goldfields before the opening of the "newer" Cariboo Road via Ashcroft.

== See also ==
- 70 Mile House
- 100 Mile House
- 150 Mile House
