= Rainbow/Q'iwentem Provincial Park =

Provincial park in the Cariboo region of British Columbia

Coordinates: 51°38′9″N 120°48′22″W

- IUCN category II (national park)
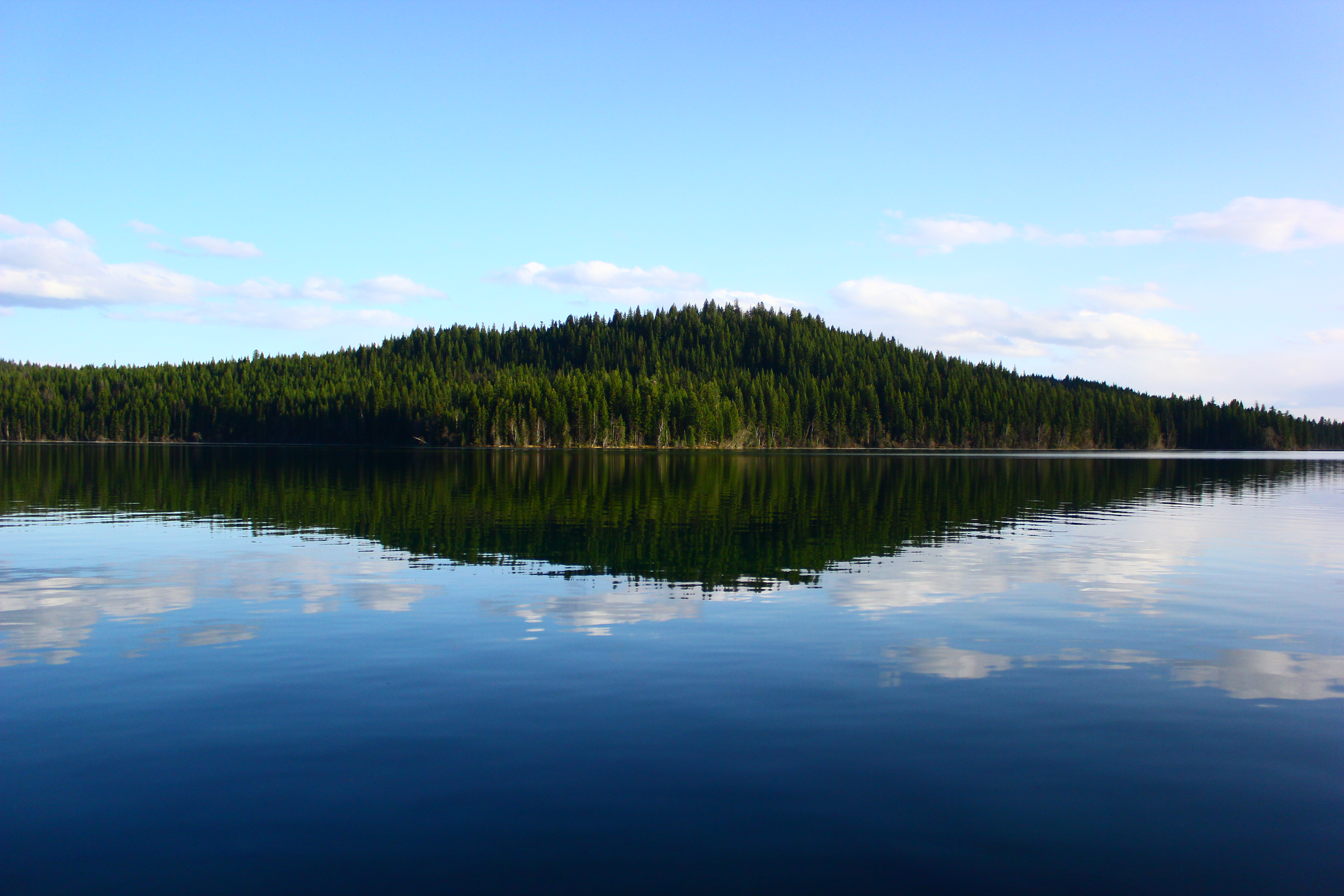
- The highest point in the park as seen from the North Shore of Sulphurous Lake
- Location: Cariboo, British Columbia
- Area: 385 hectares (950 acres)
- Established: March 14, 2013
- Governing body: BC Parks

Rainbow/Q'iwentem Provincial Park is a provincial park in the Cariboo region of British Columbia. The park was established in 2013 and is 385 hectares (950 acres) in size, protecting the land between Sulphurous Lake and Deka Lake. While there are no developed trails in the park, routes used by locals exist connecting roads on the North Shore of Deka Lake to the North Shore of Sulphurous Lake. The park is accessible by road only from the southwest.
