= Green Lake Park =

Green Lake Park may refer to:

- Green Lake Park, a park surrounding Green Lake (Seattle), United States
- Green Lake (Kunming) or Green Lake Park, an urban park in Kunming, Yunnan Province, China
- Green Lake Provincial Park, a provincial park in British Columbia, Canada
- Green Lakes State Park, Onondaga County, New York, United States
