= 150 Mile House =

Human settlement in British Columbia, Canada

150 Mile House (also referred to as "the 50") is an unincorporated community of 1,172 people in the Cariboo region of British Columbia. It is located 15 km (9 mi) southeast of Williams Lake on Highway 97.

150 Mile House was an important stop on the Cariboo Wagon Road during the Cariboo Gold Rush. Its name is derived from the distance from Lillooet, which was Mile 0 of the Old Cariboo Road. It is the junction for roads to the communities of Likely and Horsefly to the northeast.

== History ==
In 1856, Thomas W. Davidson, was transporting goods to Fort Alexandria when he came across empty farmland near Williams Lake. The local Shuswap Chief (Chief William) granted Thomas permission to set up a farm on the land. He established a store and stopping house near the Cariboo Wagon Road. A community grew and prospered, during the Cariboo Gold Rush and became known as 150 Mile House.

In 1913 the 150 Mile Courthouse was built beside Highway 97. It has been rescued from demolition twice and is the only evidence of 150 Mile House involvement with the government during the late nineteenth century and early twentieth century leaving it an unincorporated community.

== Modern day ==
150 Mile House today is occupied by farmland. One of the main attractions in 150 mile house is the “50 centre”, a mini mall and gas station. 150 Mile House is home to the oldest functional school building in the Cariboo region. The Little Red Schoolhouse was built beside the original Cariboo Wagon Road in 1896. The schoolhouse is located beside the 150 Mile House Elementary School. The Little Red Schoolhouse is the only operating building that was a part of the original townsite of 150 Mile House. The stable where students would leave their horses still stands in a nearby field, and the doctors house sits across Highway 97.

== Economy ==
150 Mile House residences are considered commuters for Williams Lake prime industries in forestry, logging, sawmilling, mining and ranching. The size of the 150 Mile House community limits the jobs available for 150 Mile House residents.

== See also ==
- 70 Mile House
- 93 Mile House
- 100 Mile House
