= Devick Lake (British Columbia) =

Lake in British Columbia, Canada

- Location in British Columbia
- Coordinates: 50.90361°N 120.08139°W

Devick Lake is a lake near Heffley Creek, British Columbia.

== History ==
It is named for Henri Louis Devick who came from Switzerland in 1904 to settle west of Heffley Creek, British Columbia. It is the source of Devick Creek.

== See also ==
- List of lakes of British Columbia
