= Surrey Lake Summit =

- Location within British Columbia
- Elevation: 1,444 metres (4,738 ft)
- Traversed by: Highway 5 (Coquihalla Highway)

Third Approach
- Location: British Columbia, Canada
- Range: Thompson Plateau
- Coordinates: 50.3812°N 120.6248°W
- Topo map: NTS 92I7 Mamit Lake

Surrey Lake Summit (el. 1,444 m or 4,738 ft), formerly known as Clapperton Creek Summit, is a highway summit in British Columbia, Canada. It is the highest point on British Columbia Highway 5, and is located between Merritt and Kamloops, near kilometre-post 322.

== See also ==
- Coquihalla Summit
