= Heffley Creek =

Neighborhood of Kamloops, British Columbia, Canada

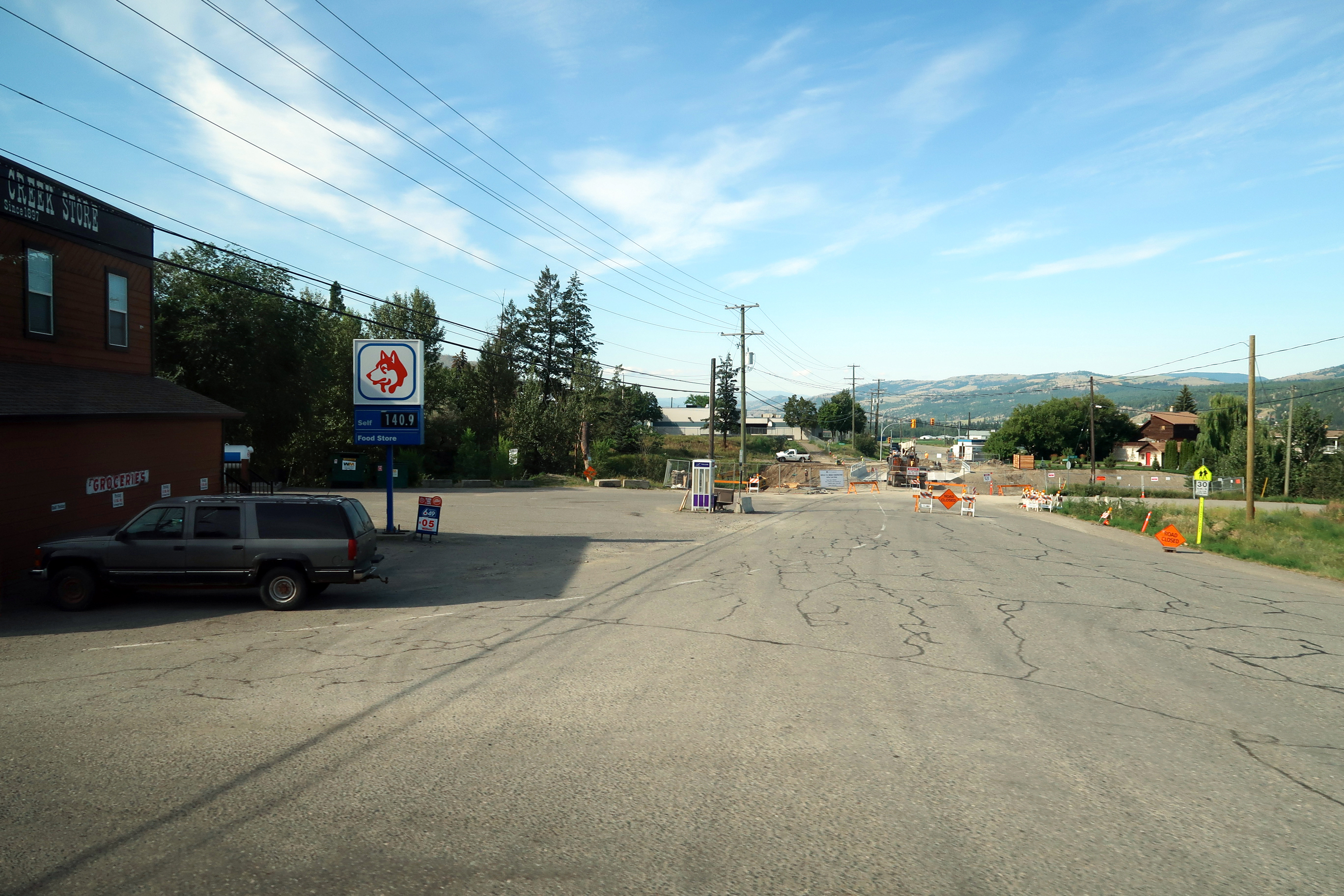
Heffley Creek (2018)

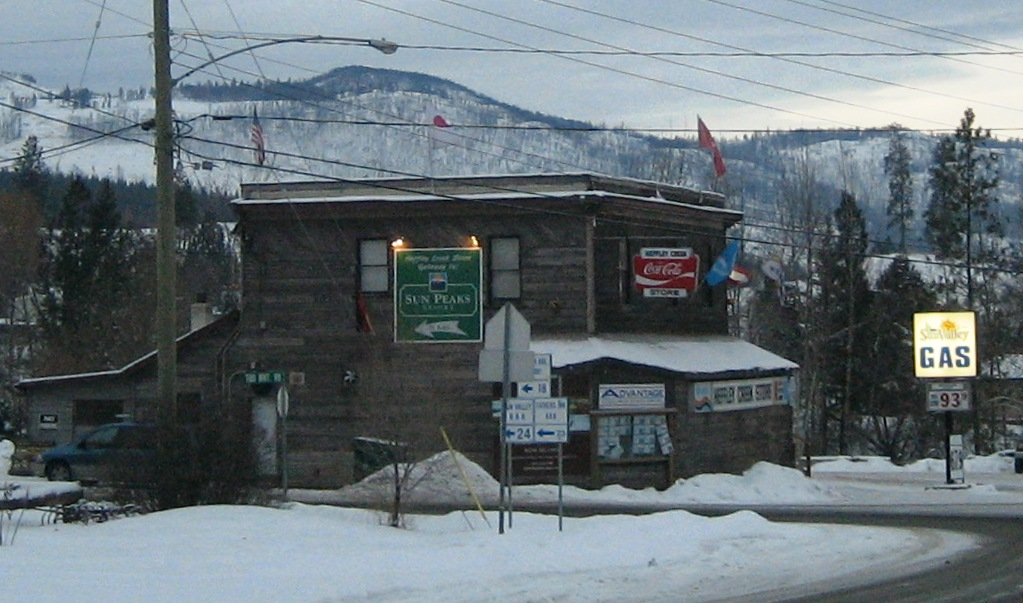
The historic Heffley Creek store

Heffley Creek is a neighbourhood of Kamloops, British Columbia, Canada along Highway 5 (the Yellowhead Highway). The city's northernmost community, it is bordered by the North Thompson River to the west, Sun Peaks to the east, Rayleigh to the south, and Vinsulla to the north. It contains a general store, community hall and elementary school. Along with the Rayleigh neighborhood, it is physically separated from the rest of Kamloops by the Thompson River and by the Kamloops Indian Reserve; Heffley Creek is located within the limits of the City of Kamloops. Prior to 1973, Heffley Creek was a separate, unincorporated community.

== Geography ==
- Knouff Lake
- Louis Creek
- Cahilty Lake
- Devick Lake
- Edwards Creek
- McGillivray Creek

=== Climate ===
Climate data for Heffley Creek
Month	Jan	Feb	Mar	Apr	May	Jun	Jul	Aug	Sep	Oct	Nov	Dec	Year
Record high °C (°F)	12.8 (55.0)	15 (59)	21 (70)	30 (86)	33.5 (92.3)	36 (97)	37.5 (99.5)	36.7 (98.1)	33 (91)	26 (79)	18.9 (66.0)	12.2 (54.0)	37.5 (99.5)
Mean daily maximum °C (°F)	−3.1 (26.4)	0.8 (33.4)	7.7 (45.9)	13.8 (56.8)	18.6 (65.5)	21.6 (70.9)	25 (77)	24.7 (76.5)	19.4 (66.9)	11.4 (52.5)	2.4 (36.3)	−2.5 (27.5)	11.7 (53.1)
Mean daily minimum °C (°F)	−11.1 (12.0)	−8.4 (16.9)	−4.4 (24.1)	−0.9 (30.4)	3.2 (37.8)	6.6 (43.9)	8.5 (47.3)	8.2 (46.8)	4.2 (39.6)	−0.5 (31.1)	−5.6 (21.9)	−9.9 (14.2)	−0.9 (30.4)
Record low °C (°F)	−38.9 (−38.0)	−33.9 (−29.0)	−33.3 (−27.9)	−11.7 (10.9)	−7.8 (18.0)	−1.5 (29.3)	−0.6 (30.9)	−1.1 (30.0)	−7.2 (19.0)	−19.5 (−3.1)	−35 (−31)	−40.6 (−41.1)	−40.6 (−41.1)
Average precipitation mm (inches)	32.7 (1.29)	25.4 (1.00)	19.2 (0.76)	22.1 (0.87)	38.6 (1.52)	46.9 (1.85)	44 (1.7)	40.3 (1.59)	34 (1.3)	26.8 (1.06)	37.8 (1.49)	41.2 (1.62)	409 (16.1)
Source: Environment Canada

== History ==
=== Fur trade and settlement ===
Heffley Creek is now inside the boundaries of the City of Kamloops, has its roots as a farming community in the 1860s. The creek was given a French name during the fur trade era and was marked on an 1837 map as Buraigon Creek. The name was later rendered as Bourdignon and Courdignon. During this period the east side of the North Thompson River was one of the routes of the fur brigades on their way to the North.

The first two settlers along the creek were Robert Todd and Samuel Bigham who were partners in business as packers and were both former Hudson's Bay Company employees. They took out adjoining 160-acre (0.65 km^{2}) preemptions with Bourdignon (Heffley) Creek as the northern boundary. Todd's lot was more westerly, bordering on the North Thompson River. Bigham was the uncle of Joseph McKay, the Chief Trader at the Hudson's Bay Company post at Kamloops from 1860 to 1865.

Bigham is first mentioned as leading a mule train to the fort in 1862. He and Todd settled at Heffley Creek in 1864 but didn't stay long. Bigham leased the hotel and restaurant in the fort at Kamloops, and Todd left for the Shushwap. Bigham died at the fort in 1867.

=== Adam Heffley ===
Heffley Creek takes its name from Adam Heffley who entered B.C. as a miner and packer during the gold rush of 1858.

In 1860 he was one of the handlers for the famous camels that were unsuccessfully used as pack animals on the Cariboo Road. He settled at Bourdignon Creek in 1865 and took over Todd's and Bigham's preemptions at the end of 1869.

Heffley raised horses on his ranch and continued to work as a packer. Some of his horses were used for racing, and he apparently had a friendly rivalry in races with Chief Louis of the Kamloops Indian Band. Heffley died of a heart attack in 1872, and though he left heirs, his property was sold at auction.

=== John Thomas Edwards ===
Adam Heffley's stock sold for $8,000, a lot of money at that time, and his land was bought by John Thomas Edwards for over $4,000. Edwards was to become a prominent rancher and businessman in the southern interior with careers as rancher, hotelier, road builder, Justice of the Peace and civic politician.

He was born in Wales where he worked as a coal miner before leaving for B.C. in 1865. After some success as a miner and storekeeper in Barkerville, he moved to Kamloops in 1872. His new ranch raised horses and a large herd of cattle which he made larger. In 1874 he planted alfalfa, thirty years before this forage crop was popular elsewhere in the district.

In spite of a setback during the bad had winter of 1879 when he lost a large number of his cattle, Edwards' ranch prospered. In 1888 Michael Hagan, editor of the Sentinel newspaper, described the ranch. "About 12 miles from town is the celebrated ranch of John T. Edwards, where the tasty residence, extensive barns, sheds, and corrals give a pleasant appearance to the ranch, while extensive fields and miles of fencing provide for perhaps the largest bands of cattle and horses along the river." By this time Heffley Creek was called Edwards Creek.

=== Other notable settlers ===
==== Michael Sullivan and J.T. Ussher ====
In the meantime other settlers had moved in the area. One of the earliest was Michael Sullivan who, in partnership with J.T. Ussher, took up land immediately north of Heffley's (Edwards') ranch in 1868. J.T. Ussher was the government agent who was killed by the McLean gang in 1879. J.T. Edwards headed up the posse that captured them. Sullivan, after whom Sullivan Lake and Vinsulla (an anagram of Sullivan) are named, sold his ranch to Edwards in 1889 and moved to Shuswap on the South Thompson.

==== James Knouff ====
James Knouff took up land around the lake that now bears his name in about 1870 though his pre-emption wasn't registered until 1873. In 1888 Hagan of the Sentinel recorded that his property adjoined the ranch of Michael Sullivan.

==== J.T. Edwards ====
In 1870, Cyrus Robbins settled about four miles (6 km) south of Heffley Creek. His land was purchased by the ever-expanding J.T. Edwards in 1882.

==== John McIver ====
John McIver, a former Hudson's Bay Company employee who started one of the first farms in the region at Cherry Creek in 1860, moved to Heffley Creek in 1869. His land, now occupied by the Rayleigh jail and formerly the Department of National Defense ammunition depot, was bought by Sam Armout in 1888. McIver's log house, built in the late 1860s, is still standing today as the oldest home in the City.

By the 1880s other ranchers had settled up the valley towards Heffley Lake and on the heights above the North Thompson River. The Sentinel noted half a dozen different families apart from the major landowners, Edwards, Sullivan and Knouff. The paper also mentioned a good deal of prospecting in the region. In the 1890s many other families settled around Heffley Creek. The Bedard family homesteaded near Knouff Lake in 1898.

=== 1890-1910 ===
The greatest change took place when J.T. Edwards sold his entire operation to Michael Sullivan in the same year. Sullivan, who continued to reside at Shuswap, rented the Circle Bar Ranch, as Edwards' place was named, to various people including W.W. Shaw in 1898 and John McCannell in 1905. They lived in the fine wood and brick house built near the river by J.T. Edwards.

Henri Louis Devick arrived from Switzerland in 1904 and after he died in 1906 his sons continued to operate the farm for many years. C.E. Lawrence homesteaded at Silent Pool beginning in 1905, and he also worked as foreman on the Circle Bar Ranch. In the meantime, J.T. Edwards, now in his late fifties, tried to make a new start in the gold rush town of Atlin in northern B.C. His luck was poor, however, and he returned to start a smaller farm at Louis Creek in 1900. He died in 1919 at age 74. Also, in 1870, Cyrus Robbins settled about four miles (6 km) south of Heffley.

Until recent years, when it has become a residential community, Heffley Creek has been primarily a quiet farming village raising cattle, sheep and mixed vegetables. What conflicts did occur were most often over water rights as one can imagine in a region where irrigation is essential. Local residents quipped that the people of Heffley would quarrel over dividing the rain drops.

After J.T. Edwards became the major rancher there in the 1870s the areas was known both as Heffley Creek and Edwards Creek. The name was officially Heffley Creek in 1905 with establishment of the post office, but the name Edwards Creek was commonly used for many years.

During the days of stage coaches frequent rest stops were necessary for the horses. Heffley Creek was known as Fourteen Mile in 1897 when the road went as far as Louis Creek. A cattle trail was cut through to Bridge Lake in 1898 by cattle boss J.T. Edwards to enable transport of cattle to various mining districts in northern B.C.

In 1897 the ranching Spratt family of four brothers opened a small hotel at Heffley Creek called the "Travellers Retreat". The hotel included a licensed bar and general store. It opened on January 19 with a duck shoot and community dance. The name of the hotel was changed to the "Halfway House" in June and by September it was sold to N.G. Armstrong.

During the mining boom in the Kamloops region a gold dredge operated from August 1901 to May 1902 at the mouth of Heffley Creek. Results were not satisfactory, however, and it was moved to Tranquille where it also failed to earn its keep. It was left derelict at Tranquille for many years. The dredge lived on in memory at Heffley Creek, however. The hotel there was renamed the "Gold Dredge Hotel", a name it retained until 1910. The building was originally log in construction, but in the 1900s wood siding was added There were nine bedrooms upstairs and a bar downstairs. By 1905 Denis Spratt was operating the hotel once again, and he held a turkey shoot to advertise its new ownership. He seemed to have trouble keeping a liquor licence, however. The licence expired in 1910 but the boarding house and stables remained open.

In July 1910 the village was threatened by a forest fire. Exhausted local residents appealed for help from Kamloops, and damage to homes and crops was averted. The Edwards Creek School, built in 1909, had been the most threatened.

=== 1911-1930 ===
In 1911 W.R. Austin purchased the old Edwards Ranch, comprising over 2,000 acres (8.1 km^{2}). He also bought the hotel and built a general store. This was the period of construction for the Canadian Northern Railway, and Austin was optimistic about the future. By 1913 he had built a dairy and a sawmill and formed the North Thompson Land Settlement Company. He had a townsite surveyed at Heffley Creek close to the railway station where he planned to sell small farms from 5 to 50 acres (20,000 to 202,000 m^{2}) in size. Few of the dreams materialized, however, and he continued to farm the land he owned. After his death in 1918 his son-in-law, E.J. Webb, operated the ranch for many years.

In 1913, Kamloops' pioneer Chinese resident, Ah Mee, purchased a farm at the north end of Heffley Creek Canyon. He owned it until his death in 1926.

- By 1912 Heffley Creek had become the centre of a thriving agriculture district. That October the community hosted the first North Thompson Exhibition in its exhibition building, called Union Hall. It was a successful event that featured agricultural exhibits, a sports program of various track events, as well as a turkey shoot and tug of war. The evening concert in the hall employed Kamloops Mayor J.T. Robinson as master of ceremonies. The community hall was called Union Hall because it was used as a meeting hall, reading room, social hall and church. The hotel was now called the "Gold Ridge Temperance Hotel" which meant it didn't have a liquor licence. The village had long distance telephone service at the general store even though it didn't have residential electricity until 1929. The population of the district grew to about three hundred during the 1920s and 1930s.

=== 1931-1940 ===
In 1931 a group of Kamloops businessmen made another attempt at dredging gold at the creek. This time, perhaps with improved technology, the dredge paid for itself until disaster struck. On June 5 the dredge broke away from its moorings and drifted downstream. When it struck a small island the dredge overturned and the operator, Henry Stevens, and his son had to swim for their lives. They were marooned on the island overnight before the police arrived from Kamloops to rescue them. Unfortunately, there wasn't enough profit from the operation to repair the dredge and start again.

In 1939 Charles McGillivray 'bought part of the old Edwards ranch, now called the Webb Ranch, and turned it into a large 'market vegetable farm. It adjoined onto the Department of National Defense property to the south, now the Rayleigh jail.

=== 1941-present ===
There was another serious incident in May 1948. This was a record flood year, and the enormous runoff caused the earth dam at Devick Lake to give way. At about three o'clock in the morning of the 25th, a 30-foot-high (9.1 m) wall of water rushed down Heffley Creek. Fortunately, the great roar of the water could be heard for miles, and people along the creek were able to wake up and run for safety. A number of homes, barns and vehicles were smashed or swept away by the water, but there were no injuries except for a few drowned cattle and other livestock. The Heffley Creek road bridge collapsed, and the water tore two large chasms in the roadbed of the C.N.R., leaving the tracks hanging in mid-air like ladders. People feared that the larger dam at Heffley Lake might also collapse so a crew of men was sent to strengthen it.

On May 1, 1973, Heffley Creek was amalgmated into the City of Kamloops.
