= Othello, British Columbia =

Othello
- Locality
- Location of Othello in British Columbia
- Coordinates: 49°22′59″N 121°21′4″W
- Country: Canada
- Province: British Columbia
- Region: Fraser Canyon
- Regional District: Fraser Valley
- Time zone: UTC−07:00 (PT)
- Area codes: 250, 778, 236, & 672
- Highways: Highway 5

Othello is a locality in the lower Fraser Canyon area of southwestern British Columbia, Canada. It is located on the north side of the Coquihalla River, about 7 km (4.3 mi) east of Hope and 4 km (2.5 mi) west of the Coquihalla Highway, near Coquihalla Canyon Provincial Park.

Othello was founded during the construction of the Kettle Valley Railway (KV), a subsidiary of the Canadian Pacific Railway. In May 1915, the eastward advance of the KV rail head from the CN/KV crossing at Hope reached about 5 kilometres (3 mi) beyond Othello.

The naming of stations from Juliet west to Othello after characters in William Shakespeare's plays is generally attributed to Andrew McCulloch, the chief engineer and a Shakespeare enthusiast. Suggested alternative bestowers have been James J. Warren, the Kettle Valley Railway president, or one of the daughters of these men.

Tunnels Road runs along the former right-of-way. Once standing about 100 metres (328 ft) before the northward bend into the visitor carpark, the station comprised a small freight/passenger shelter. Passenger service began in July 1916. The section house, likely built in 1915, was swept downstream and destroyed by the floods in 1924 and 1932. A section crew was based at Othello 1916–1959.

Following extensive rail bed and bridge destruction within the canyon caused by floods, November 1959 was the final passenger service at Othello. The Coquihalla rail line was effectively abandoned and the tracks lifted in 1961 and 1962.
