= Cahilty Lake (British Columbia) =

Lake in British Columbia, Canada

- Location within British Columbia
- Location: British Columbia
- Coordinates: 50°55′56″N 119°52′51″W
- Basin countries: Canada

Cahilty Lake is a lake in British Columbia, Canada.

== See also ==
- List of lakes of British Columbia
- Heffley Creek, British Columbia
