= Green Lake (Cariboo) =

Lake in the South Cariboo region of British Columbia, Canada

- Location within British Columbia
- Location: South Cariboo, British Columbia
- Coordinates: 51°25′00″N 121°13′00″W
- Basin countries: Canada

Green Lake is a lake in the South Cariboo region of British Columbia, Canada, located east of 70 Mile House. The lake is a popular recreational residential area frequented by owners from the Lower Mainland. Several locations around the lake are part of Green Lake Provincial Park.

== See also ==
- List of lakes of British Columbia
- Interlakes
- Cariboo Plateau
