= Deka Lake =

Lake in British Columbia, Canada

- Location within British Columbia
- Location: Cariboo, British Columbia
- Coordinates: 51.663°N 120.786°W
- Primary inflows: Sulphurous Lake
- Primary outflows: Deka Creek
- Basin countries: Canada
- Surface area: 1,153.80 ha (2,851.1 acres)
- Average depth: 21.6 m (71 ft)
- Max. depth: 91.44 m (300.0 ft)
- Surface elevation: 1,113 m (3,652 ft)
- Islands: 2

Deka Lake is a freshwater body of water located in the Cariboo region of British Columbia. It is located in the Interlakes area. The lake holds two islands, one of which is privately owned. The name also applies to the surrounding rural community. The name comes from a misspelling of the name Decker, which was the name of a family from the Canim Lake Indian Band.

== Recreation ==
The lake is stocked with Rainbow Trout and Kokanee for anglers, while Lake Trout is not stocked and is purely catch and release. A YMCA camp called Camp Deka, which is closed as of 2017, is located on the northern arm of the lake. Rainbow/Q'iwentem Provincial Park borders onto the lake, and portaging paddle craft between Sulphurous and Deka Lakes is possible where they are closest.

== Community ==
The lake and community, as well as part of the Interlakes Area, are serviced by the Deka Lake Volunteer Fire Department. The fire department has a small fire boat. The fire department hosts an annual fishing derby.

== See also ==
- List of lakes of British Columbia
