= Bridge Lake Provincial Park =

Provincial park in British Columbia, Canada

- IUCN category II (national park)
- Location within British Columbia
- Interactive map of Bridge Lake Provincial Park
- Location: Lillooet Land District, British Columbia, Canada
- Nearest city: 100 Mile House, BC
- Coordinates: 51°29′12″N 120°42′02″W
- Area: 405 ha (1,000 acres)
- Established: March 16, 1956
- Governing body: BC Parks

Bridge Lake Provincial Park is a provincial park in British Columbia, Canada. It is located at the eastern end of the lake of the same name, adjacent to the community of the same name, which is the largest community on the Interlakes Highway. It was established in 1956, and merged with the nearby Bridge Lake Centennial Park in 2003 and another expansion in 2013 brought the park to its current size. With this latest expansion, the park includes all islands and islets on the lake.

== Recreation ==
Bridge Lake Provincial Park is a destination for vehicle camping, boating, canoeing, kayaking and fishing. The park has 13 campsites and a boat launch at a site on the south shore, just off the Interlakes Highway 24.
