= Little Fort =

- Unincorporated community
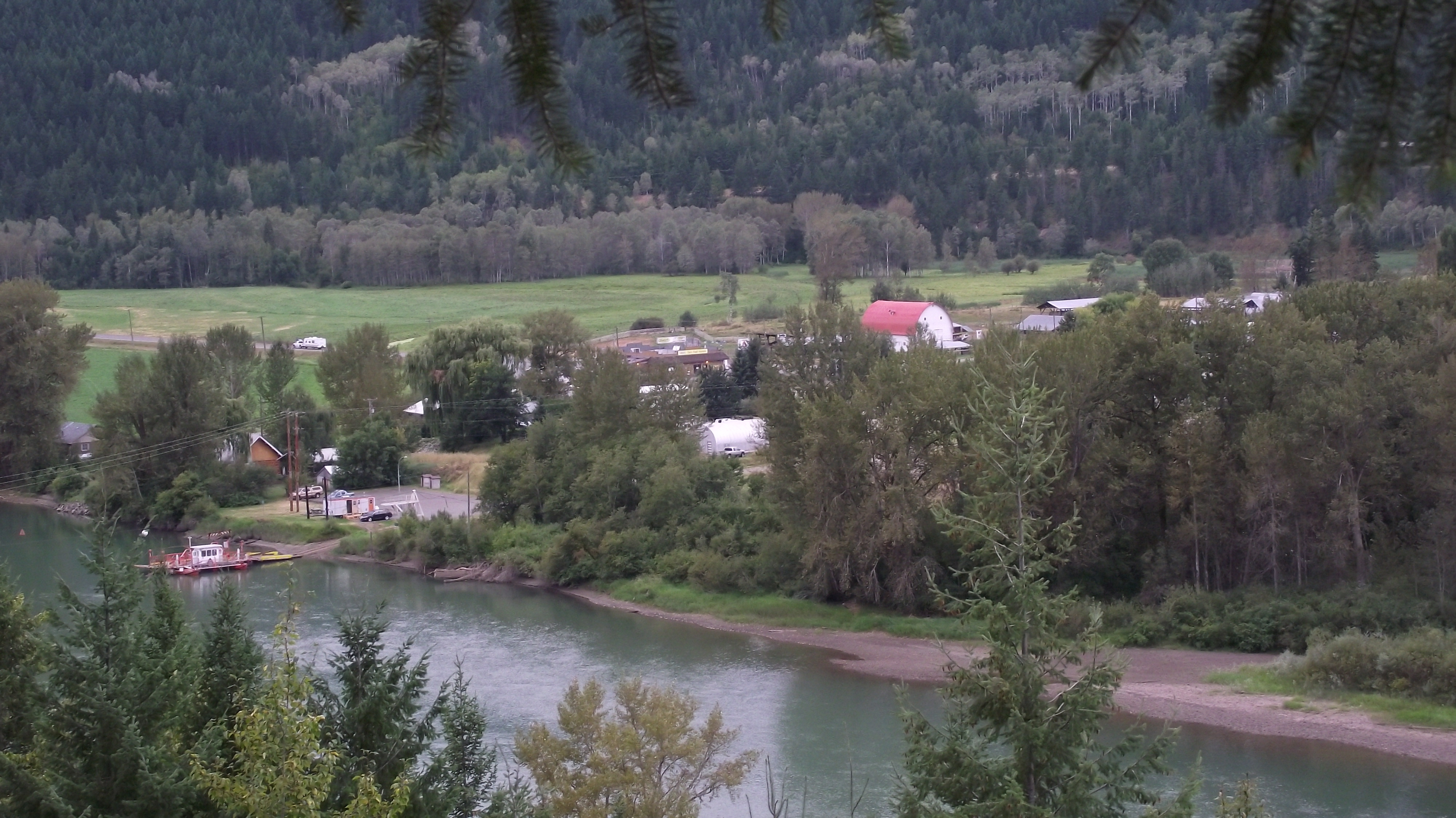

- Location of Little Fort in British Columbia
- Coordinates: 51°24′59″N 120°12′04″W
- Country: Canada
- Province: British Columbia
- Region: Thompson Country
- Regional district: Thompson-Nicola
- Time zone: UTC−07:00 (PT)
- Postal code: V0E 2C0
- Area codes: 250, 778, 236, & 672
- Highways: Highway 5 Highway 24

Little Fort is an unincorporated community in the Thompson region of south central British Columbia. The former ferry site is immediately west of the mouth of Lemieux Creek and on the west shore of the North Thompson River. At the BC Highway 24 intersection on BC Highway 5, the locality is by road about 93 kilometres (58 mi) north of Kamloops and 30 kilometres (19 mi) southwest of Clearwater.

== History ==
From the 1820s, the Hudson's Bay Brigade Trail from Fort Alexandria reached the North Thompson River at this point. In 1850, Paul Fraser, who was in charge of Fort Kamloops, established a Hudson's Bay Company (HBC) outpost on the east shore of the river. To distinguish the location from the main fort at Kamloops, the name Little Fort was chosen. Experiencing limited business, the trading post was abandoned a few years later. The deserted structure remained standing for decades.

=== Earlier community ===
In 1893, Antime Lemieux, who was the first Caucasian settler, established a trading post on the west shore. In 1896, Napoleon Genier settled his family on the east shore.

The fertile sandy soil attracted more families during 1907 and 1908. Two men from Spokane, Washington had bought the Lemieux business, which the partner named Ross ran. In 1901, blood splatter was discovered on the floor and walls, and Ross was missing. Despite a police investigation, no charges were ever laid. In 1957, the abandoned building was burned down for health reasons. The later levelling of the lot unearthed a human skeleton.

A post office operated on the east shore 1907–1909.

Mt. Olie, a nearby hill, was named after Olie Olesen, an early settler in the vicinity. Opening on the west shore in 1910, the post office was also named Mt. Olie.

Around 1912, the west shore townsite, called Mt Olie, was surveyed. Joseph H. Latremouille, who had settled on the east side around 1907, built a sawmill on Lemieux Creek in 1913. His son-in-law Charlie Davis opened a hotel that year. During this era, a racehorse track was established. In 1917, M.M. Etter bought the sawmill. In 1919, Jim Man Lee and his father opened a general store and bought the hotel, which was not rebuilt after a 1922 fire.

The settlements on both sides of the river were called Mt Olie by 1924and Little Fort by the mid-1930s.

== Transport ==
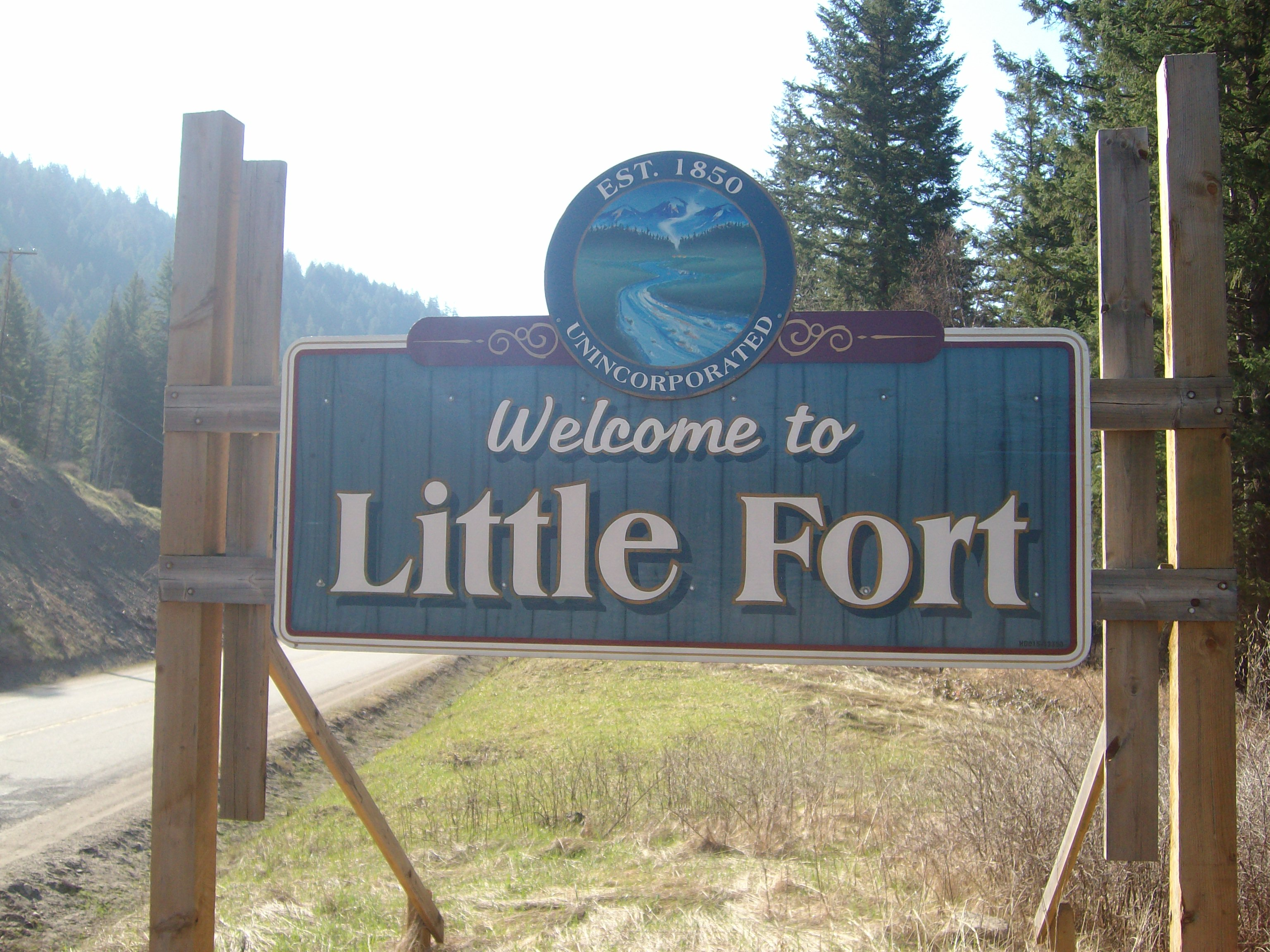
Little Fort's welcome sign, 2011

Latremouille (snr.) secured government funding to upgrade the trail south to Chu Chua on the west side into a wagon road in 1910. The next year, he established a weekly Kamloops stage, which his sons Leodore and Hector Latremouille drove. In 1913, George Mason and Albert Kempster bought the business.

In June 1913, the eastward advance of the Canadian Northern Railway (CNoR) rail head reached the location. The ferry provided settlers on the west side of the river access to the train station on the east side.

North River Coach Lines, which had operated Kamloops–Little Fort, extended the route northward to Birch Island in 1946.

Prior to ceasing all intraprovincial services in 2018, Greyhound Canada reduced service in 2013 from two to one trip daily at stops such as Little Fort.

The Kamloops–Edmonton route of Thompson Valley Charters stops in Little Fort.

== Later community ==
An access point to at least two hundred fishing lakes, the community has two motels, a gas station, pub, and church. Just north is a motel/café/campground.
