= Walloper Lake Provincial Park =

Provincial park in British Columbia, Canada

- IUCN category II (national park)
- Location within British Columbia
- Interactive map of Walloper Lake Provincial Park
- Location: British Columbia, Canada
- Nearest city: Kamloops
- Coordinates: 50°29′01″N 120°32′17″W
- Area: 0.55 km^{2} (0.21 sq mi)
- Established: September 4, 1987
- Governing body: BC Parks

Walloper Lake Provincial Park is a provincial park in British Columbia, Canada. Walloper Lake is a small lake located on the Trans-Canada Highway, 38 kilometres (24 mi) from the city of Kamloops.

== Facilities ==
The park is a day use lake side facility and is equipped with a boat launch and a recently extended pier.

== Fishing ==
The lake is known as a family fishing lake because of the readily catchable fish. The fish caught in Walloper lake spawn in a small creek on the south side of the lake. They vary in size from very small to three pounds.
