= Lone Butte, British Columbia =

Lone Butte
- Location of Lone Butte in British Columbia
- Coordinates: 51°33′14″N 121°12′24″W
- Country: Canada
- Province: British Columbia
- Region: Cariboo
- Regional district: Cariboo

Area
  - Land: 16.87 km^{2} (6.51 sq mi)

Population (2021)
  - Total: 285
  - Density: 16.9/km^{2} (44/sq mi)
- Time zone: UTC−07:00 (PT)
- Postal Codes: V0K 0A0 & V0K 1X0
- Area codes: 250, 778, 236, & 672
- Highways: Highway 24

Lone Butte is an unincorporated community in the South Cariboo region of south central British Columbia, Canada. The place is adjacent to the butte of the same name and north of Green Lake. On BC Highway 24, the locality is by road about 182 kilometres (113 mi) northwest of Kamloops and 112 kilometres (70 mi) southeast of Williams Lake.

== Community ==
The post office, which opened in 1916, was originally called Fawn.

The hamlet was once larger than 100 Mile House to the northwest. The stockyards and lumber mills are long gone, as is the heritage hotel which burned down in 1998. The present log buildings comprise a pub, restaurant, and general store, which has a gas bar. A small park includes a caboose and water tower.

The area's economy is ranching and recreation based.

The 2021 Canadian census counted Lone Butte's population as 285.

== Railway ==
The northward advance of the Pacific Great Eastern Railway (PGE) rail head passed through Lone Butte in late April 1919. This construction camp had a large kitchen employing 25 cooks, of whom two received the Distinguished Conduct Medal and three the Military Medal during World War I. At an elevation of about 1,140 metres (3,740 ft), the former station was the highest on the line.

Canadian National Railways have operated the BC Rail line since 2004.

== See also ==
- Interlakes
