= Bridge Lake, British Columbia =

Bridge Lake
- Location of Bridge Lake in British Columbia
- Coordinates: 51°29′00″N 120°43′00″W
- Country: Canada
- Province: British Columbia
- Time zone: UTC−07:00 (PT)
- Area codes: 250, 778

Bridge Lake is an unincorporated growing community located at the eastern end of Bridge Lake in the Interlakes District of the South Cariboo region of the Interior of British Columbia, Canada. In its town centre across from Webb Lakes is the small Bridge Lake General Store, Rodeo grounds, elementary school and community hall. The bigger Interlakes community is located 15 km to the west, and is the largest service centre on the Interlakes Highway.

Nearby is Bridge Lake Provincial Park and Crystal Lake

== Climate ==
Climate data for Bridge Lake
| Month | Jan | Feb | Mar | Apr | May | Jun | Jul | Aug | Sep | Oct | Nov | Dec | Year |
|---|---|---|---|---|---|---|---|---|---|---|---|---|---|
| Record high °C (°F) | 9.5 (49.1) | 12.5 (54.5) | 18.0 (64.4) | 26.5 (79.7) | 32.0 (89.6) | 32.0 (89.6) | 33.5 (92.3) | 33.0 (91.4) | 30.5 (86.9) | 26.0 (78.8) | 15.0 (59.0) | 11.5 (52.7) | 33.5 (92.3) |
| Mean daily maximum °C (°F) | −2.2 (28.0) | 1.1 (34.0) | 5.4 (41.7) | 9.9 (49.8) | 15.1 (59.2) | 18.4 (65.1) | 21.5 (70.7) | 21.8 (71.2) | 16.5 (61.7) | 8.8 (47.8) | 0.9 (33.6) | −3.2 (26.2) | 9.5 (49.1) |
| Daily mean °C (°F) | −6.5 (20.3) | −4.3 (24.3) | −0.6 (30.9) | 3.7 (38.7) | 8.3 (46.9) | 11.8 (53.2) | 14.3 (57.7) | 14.1 (57.4) | 9.7 (49.5) | 3.8 (38.8) | −2.8 (27.0) | −7.2 (19.0) | 3.7 (38.7) |
| Mean daily minimum °C (°F) | −10.8 (12.6) | −9.6 (14.7) | −6.6 (20.1) | −2.7 (27.1) | 1.6 (34.9) | 5.1 (41.2) | 7.0 (44.6) | 6.4 (43.5) | 2.9 (37.2) | −1.2 (29.8) | −6.4 (20.5) | −11.2 (11.8) | −2.1 (28.2) |
| Record low °C (°F) | −41.0 (−41.8) | −38.5 (−37.3) | −32.0 (−25.6) | −18.5 (−1.3) | −6.5 (20.3) | −3.0 (26.6) | 0.5 (32.9) | −4.5 (23.9) | −7.0 (19.4) | −25.0 (−13.0) | −42.0 (−43.6) | −43.0 (−45.4) | −43.0 (−45.4) |
| Average precipitation mm (inches) | 45.2 (1.78) | 24.5 (0.96) | 29.9 (1.18) | 36.2 (1.43) | 61.2 (2.41) | 78.4 (3.09) | 73.4 (2.89) | 52.1 (2.05) | 48.0 (1.89) | 42.8 (1.69) | 52.6 (2.07) | 51.4 (2.02) | 595.5 (23.44) |
| Average rainfall mm (inches) | 4.1 (0.16) | 2.2 (0.09) | 6.8 (0.27) | 19.5 (0.77) | 52.6 (2.07) | 77.8 (3.06) | 73.4 (2.89) | 52.1 (2.05) | 47.4 (1.87) | 29.9 (1.18) | 12.5 (0.49) | 1.2 (0.05) | 379.6 (14.94) |
| Average snowfall cm (inches) | 41.0 (16.1) | 22.3 (8.8) | 23.1 (9.1) | 16.6 (6.5) | 8.6 (3.4) | 0.7 (0.3) | 0.0 (0.0) | 0.0 (0.0) | 0.6 (0.2) | 12.9 (5.1) | 40.0 (15.7) | 50.2 (19.8) | 215.9 (85.0) |
| Average precipitation days (≥ 0.2 mm) | 14.5 | 10.1 | 11.6 | 12.1 | 16.7 | 16.7 | 14.2 | 12.6 | 12.0 | 13.8 | 15.4 | 14.9 | 164.5 |
| Average rainy days (≥ 0.2 mm) | 1.9 | 1.6 | 4.5 | 7.9 | 15.7 | 16.7 | 14.2 | 12.6 | 12.0 | 10.8 | 4.5 | 0.8 | 103.2 |
| Average snowy days (≥ 0.2 cm) | 13.6 | 9.1 | 8.3 | 6.2 | 2.6 | 0.3 | 0.0 | 0.0 | 0.4 | 4.7 | 12.1 | 14.4 | 71.6 |
