= Interlakes =

Coordinates: 51°30′00″N 120°50′00″W

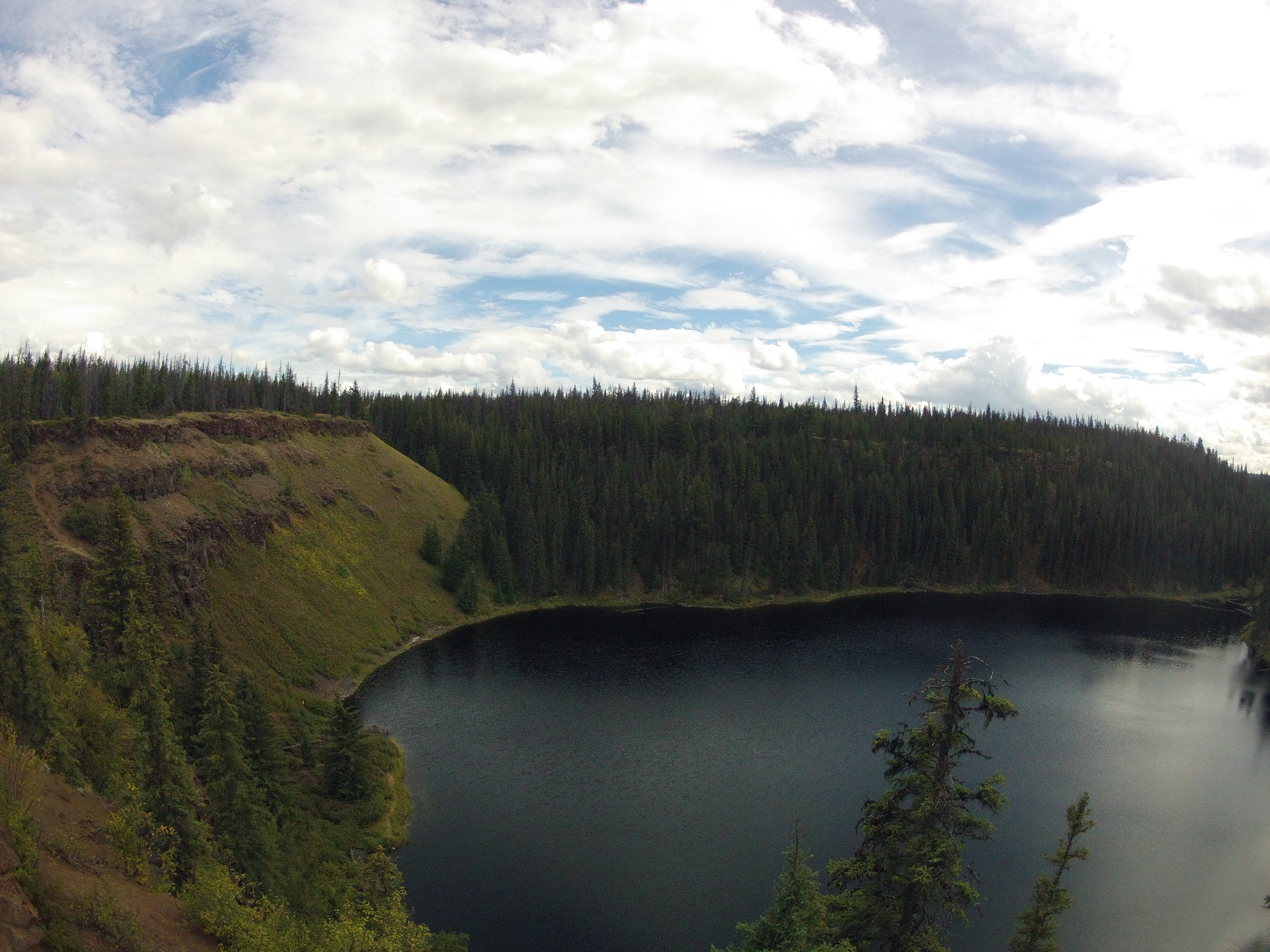
Crater Lake, near Green Lake

The Interlakes, also known as the Interlakes District, is a geographic region of the Interior of British Columbia, Canada, located along and around the Interlakes Highway between 100 Mile House on BC Highway 97 and Little Fort on the North Thompson River. The area is a subregion of the Cariboo and includes the communities of Bridge Lake and Lac des Roches.

Provincial billboards promoting the area show it as being bounded by Canim Lake, Lac des Roches, Young Lake and Green Lake, with Highway 97 (the Cariboo Highway) and Canim Lake Road as its western and northwestern limits. The area contains over 1600 households and most are along the corridor from Lone Butte, just east of 70 Mile House, and Bridge Lake. Another interpretation from the Cariboo Regional District includes Sheridan Lake and Deka Lake.

The Interlakes area is served by a volunteer fire department and its west and east jurisdiction boundaries are

- 1 kilometre west of Fawn Creek Road (West)
- Wavey Lake FSR (east) - This is where the Cariboo Regional District ends.

== Transportation ==
The Interlakes region is served by the Interlakes or Little Fort Highway, Highway 24. The route is not serviced by buses. The route begins south of 100 Mile House and terminates at Little Fort. Most roads in the area are unpaved but ploughed.
