= 70 Mile House =

Human settlement in British Columbia, Canada

Coordinates: 51°18′13″N 121°23′50″W

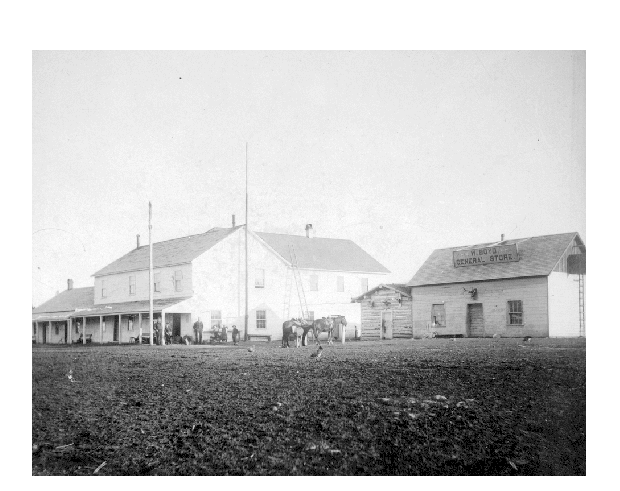
70 Mile House 1884

70 Mile House is a community situated on Highway 97 in the Cariboo region of British Columbia, Canada. Its name is derived from its distance from Lillooet, which was Mile 0 of the Old Cariboo Road. Other examples of towns named by their distance from Lillooet on the Old Cariboo Road are 93 Mile House, 100 Mile House, and 150 Mile House. In its heyday, 70 Mile House was a frequent stop for stagecoaches, such as the ones run by Barnard's Express and for Cataline's mule train.

== History ==
70 Mile House was the first stopping place built on the Old Cariboo Road. Charles Adrian pre-empted the land in 1862 and built a roadhouse on the property. The roadhouse was used in the winter of 1862-1863 by pioneer road builder Gustavus Blin Wright as a camp for his labourers.

In the spring of 1863, Wright purchased the property and leased it to other operators until 1869 when he sold it to JM Roberts and Edward Fisher. They sold the roadhouse in 1875 to John and William Saul. The Sauls sold it to William Boyd in the 1880s, and he and his family operated it for twenty years.

== Present day ==
The roadhouse at 70 Mile House burned down in 1956, but travellers on Highway 97 will still find a store and a variety of other services at this historic location.
