= British Columbia Highway 24 =

Highway in British Columbia

Highway 24
- Little Fort Highway; Interlakes Highway

Route information
- Maintained by the Ministry of Transportation and Infrastructure
- Length: 97.50 km (60.58 mi)
- Existed: 1977–present

Major junctions
- West end: Highway 97 at 93 Mile House
- East end: Highway 5 (YH) at Little Fort

Location
- Country: Canada
- Province: British Columbia

Highway system
- British Columbia provincial highways
| ← Highway 23 | → Highway 26 |

Highway 24, also known as the Little Fort Highway or the Interlakes Highway, is a 97-kilometre-long (60 mi) east-west connection between the Cariboo Highway, just south of 100 Mile House, and the Southern Yellowhead Highway at Little Fort. It practically provides a "second-chance" route to travellers heading east from Vancouver who missed the route to the northern part of the province or toward Edmonton.

Although a rural gravel road did exist between 93 Mile House and Little Fort previously, construction under the Highway 24 name on the modern route did not begin until 1974. A dirt highway was open by 1977. Paving and auxiliary feature installation was complete by 1981.

== Route description ==
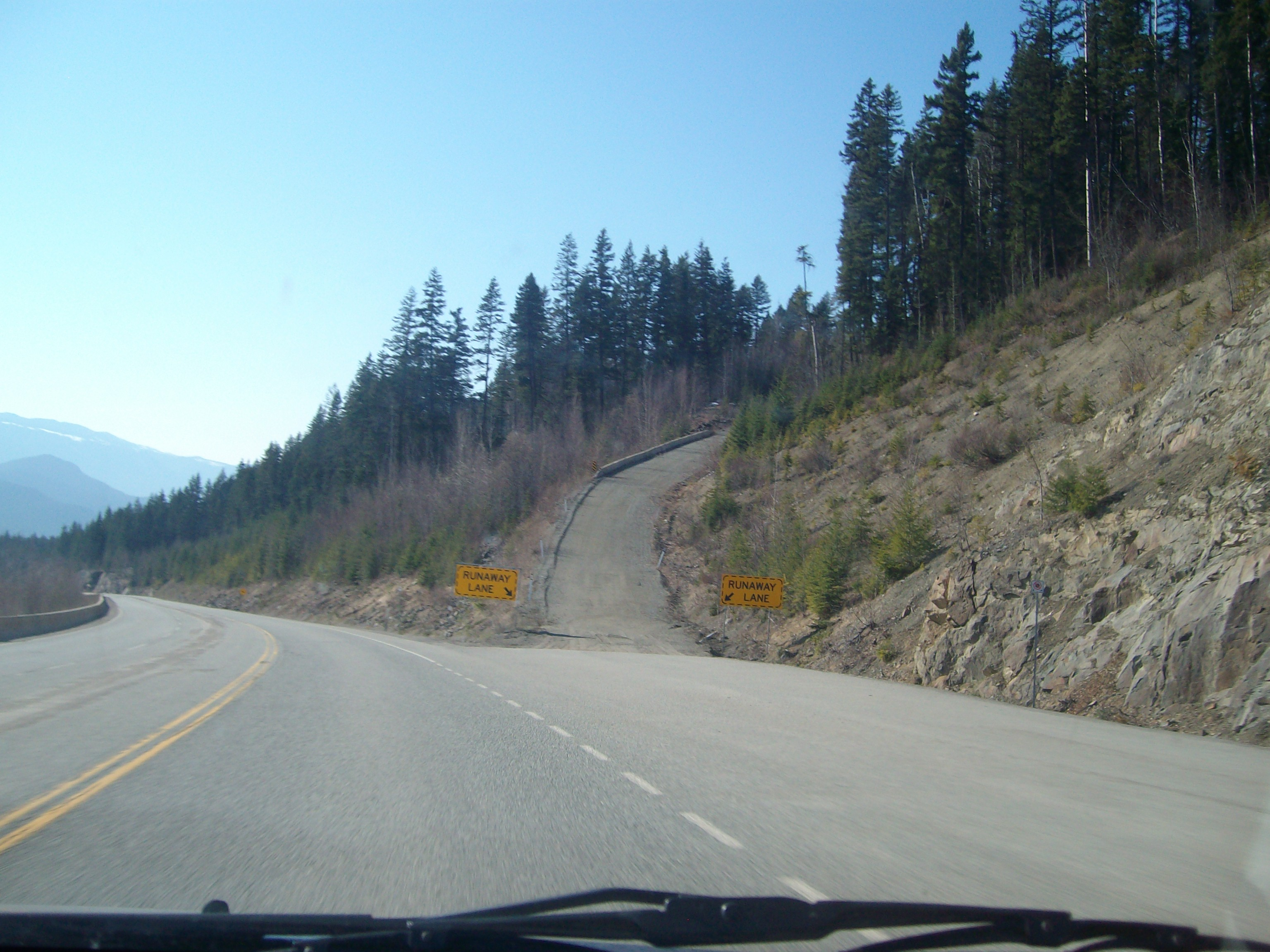
Highway 24 near Little Fort (April 2011)

Highway 24 straddles the boundary between the Cariboo and Thompson-Nicola Regional Districts. It begins in the west at 93 Mile House, approximately 11 km (6.8 mi) south of 100 Mile House. After 9 km (5.6 mi), it passes through the small community of Lone Butte. After passing several turn-offs to resort lakes including Sheridan Lake, the highway passes through the community of Bridge Lake, 38 km (24 mi) later. The highway then proceeds another 50 km (31 mi) east through the forest and over a large hill before reaching its terminus in Little Fort.

A very scenic drive, the highway follows a historic trail used by the Shuswap people as a trade route and was later developed by the Hudson's Bay Company in the early 19th century to bring furs from northern BC out to Fort Kamloops and the Columbia River.

== Major intersections ==
| Regional District | Location | km | mi | Destinations | Notes |
|---|---|---|---|---|---|
| Cariboo | 93 Mile House | 0.00 | 0.00 | Highway 97 – Cache Creek, 100 Mile House | Western terminus; road continues as Industrial Flats Road |
| Cariboo | Lone Butte | 10.12 | 6.29 | | |
| Cariboo | | 31.23 | 19.41 | Horse Lake Road (Highway 907:1153 north) – Deka Lake, Hathaway Lake, Mahood Lake | |
| Thompson-Nicola | | 75.95 | 47.19 | McDonald Summit – elevation 1,311 m (4,301 ft) | |
| Thompson-Nicola | Little Fort | 97.50 | 60.58 | Highway 5 (YH) – Clearwater, Kamloops | Eastern terminus; road continues as Ferry Road |
1.000 mi = 1.609 km; 1.000 km = 0.621 mi

== See also ==
- Hudson's Bay Brigade Trail
