= Cariboo =

Region of British Columbia, Canada

Coordinates: 52°00′N 122°00′W

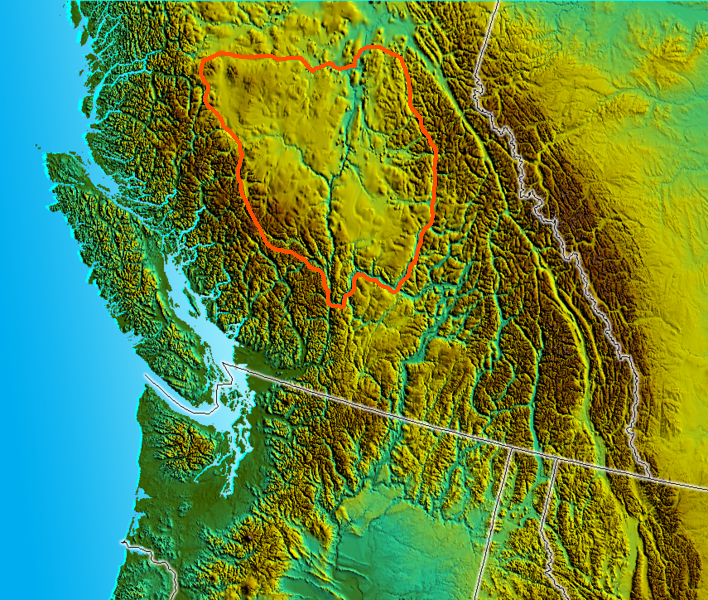
Location of "the Cariboo" as a cultural/historical region, including the Chilcotin and Lillooet-Thompson areas

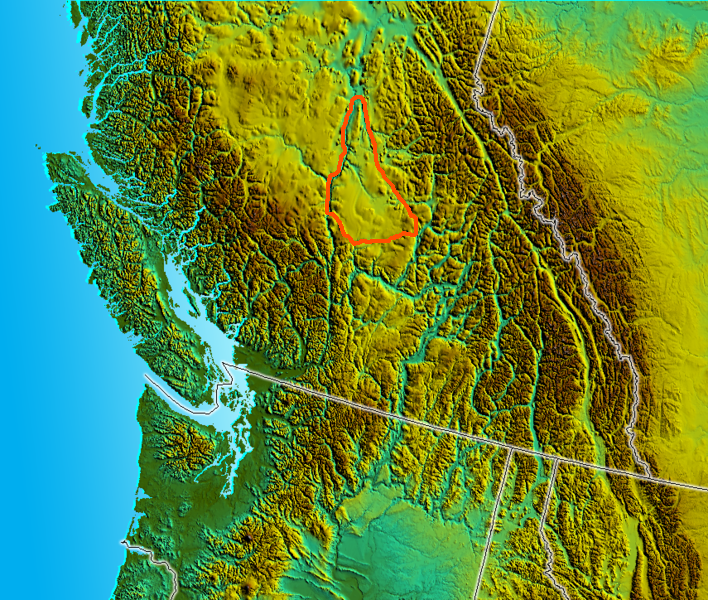
Location of the Cariboo Plateau proper

The Cariboo is an intermontane region of British Columbia, Canada, centered on a plateau stretching from Fraser Canyon to the Cariboo Mountains. The name is a reference to the caribou that were once abundant in the region.

The Cariboo was the first region of the interior north of the lower Fraser River and its canyon to be settled by non-indigenous people, and played an important part in the early history of the colony and province. The boundaries of the Cariboo proper in its historical sense are debatable, but its original meaning was the region north of the forks of the Quesnel River and the low mountainous basins between the mouth of that river on the Fraser at the city of Quesnel and the northward end of the Cariboo Mountains, an area that is mostly in the Quesnel Highland and focused on several now-famous gold-bearing creeks near the head of the Willow River. The richest of them all, Williams Creek, is the location of Barkerville, which was both the capital of the Cariboo Gold Rush and of government officialdom for decades afterwards (it is now a museum town).

The Cariboo goldfields are underpopulated today but were once the most settled and most significant of the regions of interior British Columbia. As settlement spread southwards of this area, flanking the route of the Cariboo Road and spreading out through the rolling plateaus and benchlands of the Cariboo Plateau and lands adjoining it along the Fraser and Thompson rivers, the meaning changed to include a wider area than just the goldfields.

The grasslands of the Cariboo are home to the regionally endangered American badger (Taxidea taxus jeffersonii).

== Name ==
As early as 1861, Governor Douglas used the name Cariboo to describe the area in dispatches to Britain.

== Notable towns ==
North Cariboo:

- Quesnel
- Wells
- Likely
- Barkerville
- McLeese Lake

Central Cariboo:

- Williams Lake
- Horsefly
- 150 Mile House
- Lac La Hache

South Cariboo:

- 100 Mile House
- Forest Grove
- Interlakes
- Lone Butte
- 70 Mile House
- Clinton

== See also ==
- Cariboo Plateau
- Cariboo Gold Rush
