= Upper Summit Lake (British Columbia) =

Lake in British Columbia, Canada

- Location within British Columbia
- Location: Cariboo Land District, Central Interior, British Columbia
- Coordinates: 54°17′00″N 122°42′00″W
- Primary outflows: Unnamed creek to Summit Lake
- Basin countries: Canada
- Max. length: 1.8 km (1.1 mi)
- Max. width: 0.9 km (0.56 mi)
- Surface elevation: 711 m (2,333 ft)

Upper Summit Lake is a lake in Cariboo Land District, in the Central Interior of British Columbia, Canada, about 40 kilometres (25 mi) north of the city of Prince George and 20 kilometres (12 mi) south of the community of Bear Lake. It lies just west of Highway 97 (John Hart Highway).

== Hydrology ==
Upper Summit Lake is about 1.8 kilometres (1.1 mi) long and 0.9 kilometres (0.6 mi) wide, and lies at an elevation of 711 metres (2,333 ft). There are no inflows, and an unnamed creek flows from the southern tip of the lake to Summit Lake. This flows via the Crooked River, McLeod River, Pack River, Williston Lake, Peace River, Slave River, Great Slave Lake and the Mackenzie River into the Beaufort Sea portion of the Arctic Ocean.

== See also ==
- List of lakes of British Columbia
