= Crooked River (British Columbia) =

Watercourse in British Columbia, Canada

Coordinates: 54°50′19″N 122°53′15″W

The Crooked River is a river in the Central Interior of British Columbia, Canada, beginning at Summit Lake and the community of the same name, flowing north into McLeod Lake. It is part of the drainage area of the Pack River, via the McLeod River north from McLeod Lake and which feeds Lake Williston, and therefore also part of the Peace River basin and in the Arctic Ocean drainage. South of its source at Summit Lake is the drainage basin of the Fraser River, and so of the Pacific Ocean. Crooked River Provincial Park is located close its course, on Bear Lake just south of the community of Bear Lake.

The Crooked River is known to contain at least 39 species of caddisflies (Trichoptera), several of which were the first records of their species for British Columbia.

== See also ==
- List of rivers of British Columbia
