= Carp Lake Provincial Park =

Provincial park in British Columbia

- IUCN category II (national park)
- Location within British Columbia
- Interactive map of Carp Lake Provincial Park
- Location: Cariboo Land District, British Columbia, Canada
- Nearest city: McLeod Lake, BC
- Coordinates: 54°45′59″N 123°22′59″W
- Area: 38,149 ha (94,270 acres)
- Established: May 18, 1973
- Governing body: BC Parks

Carp Lake Provincial Park is a provincial park in British Columbia, Canada, two hours northwest of Prince George between the Muskeg and McLeod Rivers, to the southwest of the community of McLeod Lake, which is 32 km from the park's campground.
