= H. Bullock Webster =

Painter (1855–1942)

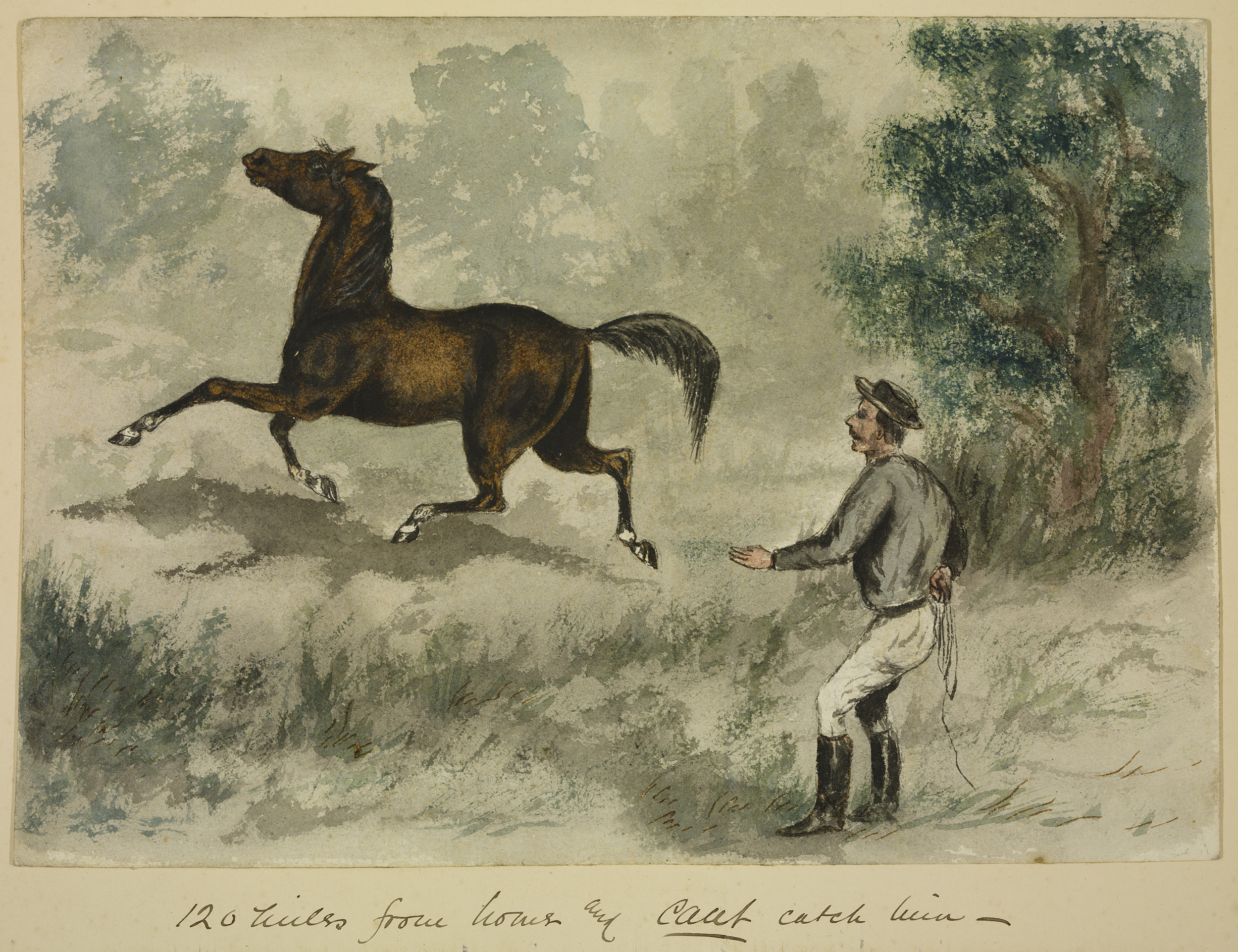
- 120 miles from home and can't catch him
- Born: 1855; England
- Died: 1942 (aged 86–87)
- Known for: Water colours and sketches

Harold Bullock Webster (1855–1942) was a self-taught painter who worked in Canada, the U.K., and New Zealand.

Webster was born in England but emigrated as an adolescent to Canada. He began an apprenticeship as a clerk for the Hudson's Bay Company in 1874. He made many business trips to the company's posts in the western part of Canada, such as northern Alberta and British Columbia.

By 1878 he managed the trading post at Fort Connelly on Bear Lake in northern British Columbia. In 1880 he returned to Britain and emigrated from there to New Zealand, where he worked as a farmer's agent. On behalf of his employer, Thomas Russell, he travelled to Waikato, the Bay of Plenty, East Coast and Wanganui. At the age of 83, he published in 1938 his Memories of Sport and Travel Fifty Years Ago: From the Hudson's Bay Company to New Zealand.

He made many sketches during his lifetime, although he lacked training as an artist. While working at the Hudson's Bay Company from 1874 to 1880, he created an album of approximately 93 colour sketches that depicted everyday life, including customs, clothing, and activities in the company’s outposts, particularly near Stuart Lake and Fort McLeod. Several of his sketches feature First Nations and Métis individuals involved in the Canadian fur trade. Some sketches were reprinted in The Graphic magazine in England.

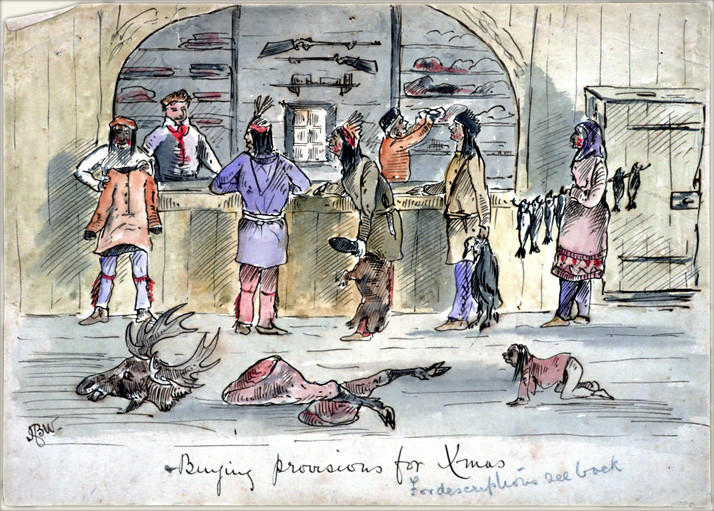
Buying provisions for Xmas
