= Kelowna International Airport =

International airport in British Columbia, Canada

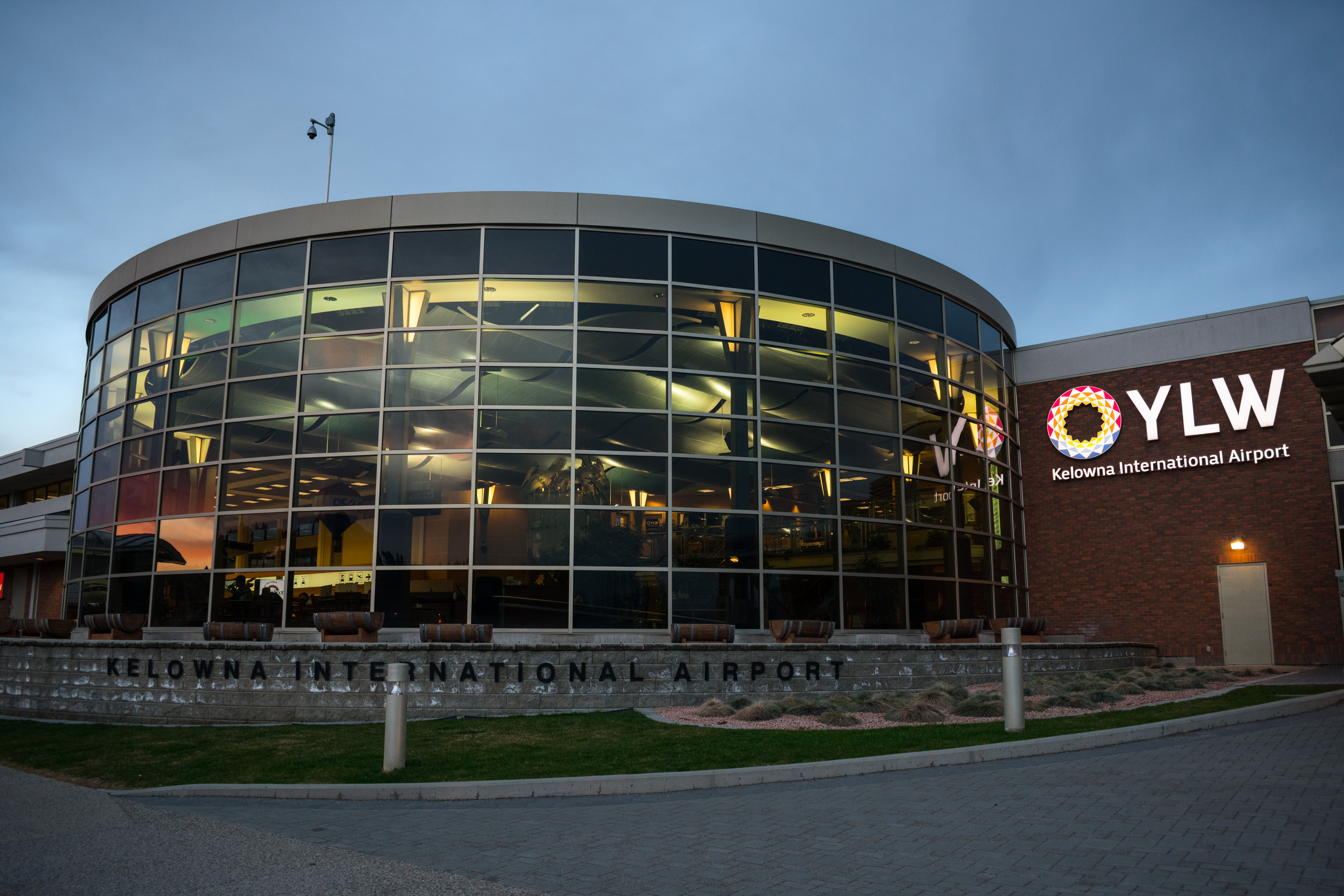
- IATA: YLW; ICAO: CYLW; WMO: 71203

Summary
- Airport type: Public
- Owner: Transport Canada
- Operator: City of Kelowna
- Serves: Kelowna, British Columbia
- Time zone: MST (UTC−07:00)
- Elevation AMSL: 1,420 ft (430 m)
- Coordinates: 49°57′22″N 119°22′40″W
- Public transit access: Kelowna Regional Transit 23; Vernon Regional Transit 90
- Website: ylw.kelowna.ca

Map
- Location in British Columbia CYLW (Canada)

Runways
Direction	Length		Surface
Direction	ft	m	Surface
16/34	9,039	2,755	Asphalt

Statistics (2025)
- Total Passengers: 2,315,432
- Sources: Canada Flight Supplement; Environment Canada; Movements from Statistics Canada; Passenger statistics from City of Kelowna

Kelowna International Airport (IATA: YLW, ICAO: CYLW) is a Canadian airport located approximately 10 minutes or 6.2 nautical miles (11.5 km; 7.1 mi) northeast of Kelowna, British Columbia on Highway 97.

The single runway airport operates scheduled air service to Vancouver, Victoria, Prince George, Calgary, Edmonton, Toronto, Seattle, Montreal, as well as less frequent seasonal service to Cancún, Puerto Vallarta, Los Cabos, and Phoenix. Currently, the airport handles up to 36 commercial departures a day, or approximately 248 departures per week. Three major airlines serve the airport: Air Canada, Alaska Airlines, and WestJet.

In 2025, YLW was Canada's 9th busiest airport by passenger traffic, with 2,315,432 passengers, representing an 8.5% increase over 2024.

== History ==
In 1946, a plebiscite was held which authorized the city of Kelowna to purchase the 320-acre Dickson Ranch for $20,000. The airport was opened in 1947 with a 3,000 foot long grass airstrip and a small terminal. Commercial service first began in 1958 by Canadian Pacific Airlines to Vancouver. In 1960, the runway was paved and extended to 5,350 feet. Through the 1960s and 1970s the airport continued to be expanded with a new terminal building, an air traffic control tower, and an onsite weather office. From the late 1960s to the mid-1980s, Pacific Western Airlines was the primary passenger air carrier serving the airport with Boeing 737-200 jetliners on nonstop and direct flights between Kelowna and Calgary, Edmonton, Vancouver and other small cities in British Columbia with the airline also operating Convair 640 and de Havilland Canada DHC-6 Twin Otter turboprops as well as Douglas DC-3 and Piper Navajo prop aircraft on regional flights. By 1985, Pacific Western had become an all-jet airline and was operating up to sixteen departures a day with the Boeing 737-200 from Kelowna including direct, no change of plane service to Toronto. Throughout the 1980s and 1990s commercial and cargo traffic increased, necessitating more than $10 million of investment in upgrades to the terminal building, runway and airline operating facilities.

In 1996, Greyhound Air was flying daily nonstop service to its hub in Winnipeg with direct one stop service to Hamilton, Ontario, with Boeing 727-200 jetliners operated by local company Kelowna Flightcraft Air Charter (now KF Cargo). Also in 1996, WestJet was operating nonstop Boeing 737-200 jet service to Calgary, Edmonton, Vancouver and Victoria, British Columbia, as well as direct one stop 737 service to Regina.

In 1998, a $20 million expansion program doubled the size of the terminal building, increased parking, and expanded airside facilities to accommodate the projected 1 million passengers by 2011. By 1999, five airlines were serving Kelowna: Air BC with code sharing flights on behalf of Air Canada, Central Mountain Air with code sharing flights also on behalf of Air Canada, Canadian Regional Airlines with code sharing flights including Fokker F28 Fellowship jet service on behalf of Canadian Airlines, Horizon Air with code sharing flights on behalf of Alaska Airlines, and WestJet with the latter air carrier continuing to operate Boeing 737-200 jets on all of its flights at this time.

In 2006, Harmony Airways was operating weekly nonstop Boeing 757-200 jet service between Kelowna and Honolulu.

== Terminal facilities ==
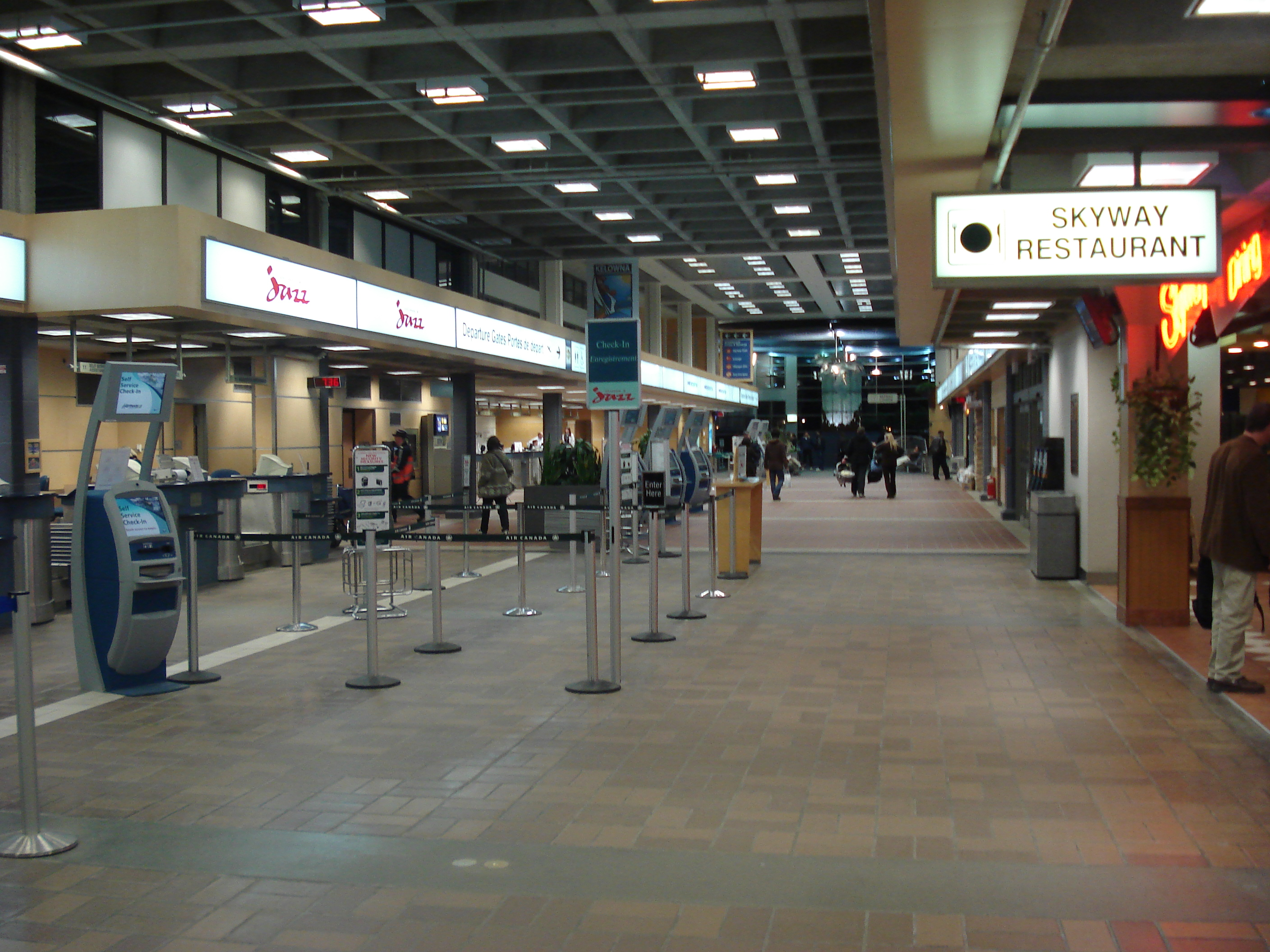
Interior of the airport terminal's check-in area

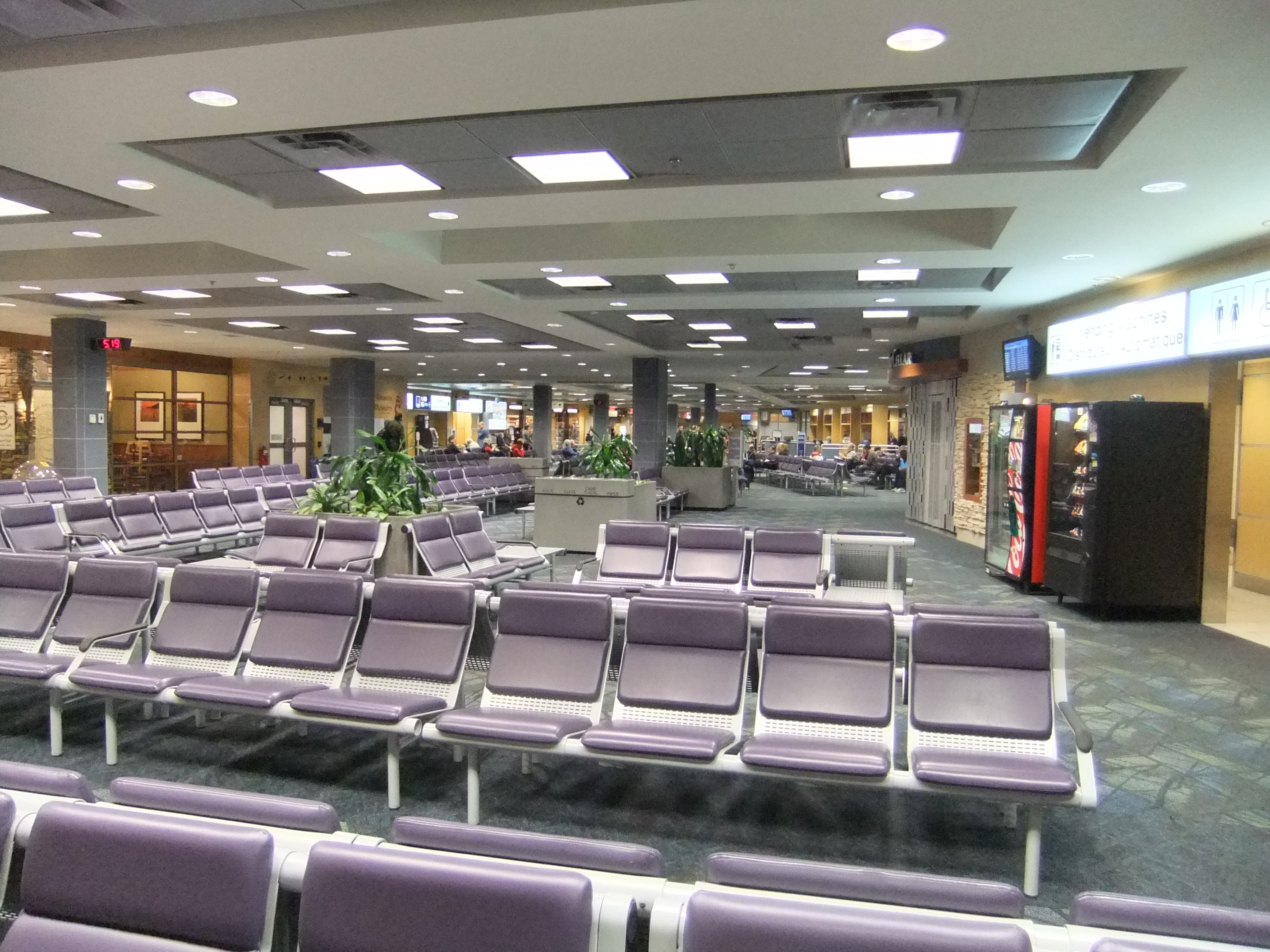
Departure lounge of the airport

The main terminal building is a full-service facility covering approximately 76,000 sq ft (7,100 m^{2}). There are 10 aircraft loading positions, half of which are fitted with jet bridges. The arrivals area contains three baggage carousels, one of which can be cordoned off to accommodate international/US arrivals (and remaining two for domestic arrivals) and Canadian Customs processing. (The airport has a CATSA pre-board screening area, but not US pre-boarding clearance zone; it is the busiest Canadian airport by passenger traffic without United States border preclearance.)

The departure lounge features a wired business centre and complimentary wireless Internet. The airport's focal point is a glass rotunda which contains a fountain and the cylindrical glass sculpture "Escape from Stella Polaris" and Skyway Atrium Lounge. Kelowna Art Gallery operates a satellite site at the airport. A small observation area is located on the mezzanine level.

== Airlines and destinations ==
Key destinations from the airport are the Pacific Northwest (United States and Canada), Western Canada, Northern Canada, and Eastern Canada, as well as seasonal connections to the Southwestern United States and Mexico

=== Passenger ===
Airlines	Destinations
Air Canada	Montréal–Trudeau; Seasonal: Toronto–Pearson, Vancouver
Air Canada Express	Calgary, Vancouver
Air Canada Rouge	Toronto–Pearson, Vancouver
Air North	Vancouver
Alaska Airlines	Seattle/Tacoma; Seasonal: Los Angeles
Canadian North	Charter: Fort McMurray, Kamloops, Vancouver
Central Mountain Air	Prince George Vancouver
Flair Airlines	Edmonton; Seasonal: Calgary, Vancouver
North Cariboo Air	Charter: Fort St. John, Vancouver, Victoria
Pacific Coastal Airlines	Comox, Cranbrook, Nanaimo, Prince George, Victoria
Porter Airlines	Toronto–Pearson; Seasonal: Ottawa
WestJet	Calgary, Edmonton, Toronto–Pearson (resumes March 25, 2027), Vancouver; Seasonal: Cancún, Mazatlán, Phoenix–Sky Harbor, Puerto Vallarta, San José del Cabo, Winnipeg
WestJet Encore	Calgary, Edmonton, Vancouver, Victoria; Seasonal: Regina, Saskatoon, Seattle/Tacoma

== Statistics ==
=== Annual traffic ===
Annual passenger traffic
Year	Passengers	% Change
2010	1,391,807	Steady
2011	1,390,187	▼0.1%
2012	1,443,997	▲3.8%
2013	1,504,694	▲4.2%
2014	1,602,899	▲6.5%
2015	1,593,606	▼0.5%
2016	1,732,113	▲8.7%
2017	1,893,470	▲9.3%
2018	2,080,372	▲9.9%
2019	2,032,144	▼2.3%
2020	737,447	▼63.7%
2021	829,804	▲12.5%
2022	1,718,059	▲107.0%
2023	2,032,624	▲18.3%
2024	2,133,582	▲4.9%
2025	2,315,432	▲8.5%

== Ground transportation ==
Cars, buses and taxis can connect to the airport for Kelowna via Highway 97. The airport has an outdoor parking lot next to the terminal and some short term spaces near the terminal building.

=== Public transit ===
The airport is serviced by Kelowna Regional Route 23 and Vernon Regional Route 90 (rush hour service only) buses, which connect Vernon and Lake Country with UBC Okanagan Exchange in Kelowna. The airport is not served by the bus on evenings and weekends. Passengers heading to downtown Kelowna or West Kelowna can transfer to 97X Kelowna RapidBus at UBC Okanagan Exchange.

== Future expansion ==
In 2006, the Kelowna International Airport Advisory Committee created the Master Plan 2025, a document dedicated to the expansion of the Kelowna International Airport. The Plan is expected to cost approximately $150 million. Due to YLW's unprecedented growth, a Master Plan was required to aid in keeping the airport at modern traffic handling standards. By 2008, the airport lengthened the single runway to 8,900 ft (2,700 m), and plans to lengthen to 10,000 ft (3,000 m) by 2025. Also, the passenger terminal has been expanded so as to allow hourly processing of 680 passengers in 2015, and will be further expanded as to allow 900 passengers by 2025. Currently, the hourly rate is approximately 400 passengers. In order to do this, the terminal size will be nearly doubled, and a 2,400 space parkade will be constructed. Also, to reduce vehicular traffic congestion, a diamond overpass/underpass interchange will be constructed at the current intersection of Highway 97 and Airport Way. A hotel is now being built on site next to the terminal.

== Accidents and incidents ==
- October 13, 2016: Former Alberta premier Jim Prentice was among the four people killed in a small-plane crash in British Columbia that took off from Kelowna Airport. Prentice, 60, was aboard a twin-engine Cessna Citation that disappeared from radar shortly after takeoff from Kelowna, en route to the Springbank Airport, just outside Calgary.
- August 18, 2023: The airspace surrounding Kelowna International Airport had been closed to allow aerial fire-fighting activity for the wildfires in the Kelowna area.

== See also ==
- List of airports in the Okanagan
