= Orchard Park Shopping Centre =

Shopping mall in Kelowna, British Columbia

- Coordinates: 49.88°N 119.44°W
- Address: 2271 Harvey Avenue; Kelowna, British Columbia; V1Y 6H2
- Opened: 1971
- Manager: Primaris REIT
- Owner: Primaris REIT
- Num. of stores: over 170
- Num. of anchor tenants: 6
- Floor area: 685,000 square feet (63,600 m^{2})
- Floors: 1
- Website: orchardparkshopping.com

Orchard Park Shopping Centre is a regional shopping mall in Kelowna, British Columbia, Canada. It is the largest shopping mall in the Okanagan. It is located on the major provincial highway, Harvey Avenue (Highway 97), at the intersections of Cooper Road and Dilworth Drive, south of Dilworth Mountain. With over 170 shops and services, Orchard Park Shopping Centre is the largest shopping mall between Greater Vancouver and the Calgary Region.

== History ==
Orchard Park opened September 28, 1971 on a former orchard. The original mall layout included anchors Simpsons-Sears and The Bay (although The Bay was not completed until 1972) and a corridor of 35 smaller stores. In 1980, the mall expanded with Woolco department store and a food court. It expanded again in 1992 with Eatons before reaching its current size in 2011 when Best Buy opened.

On October 10, 2017, Sears Canada announced it would seek court approval to shut down all of its remaining stores, including its Sears and Sears Home locations at Orchard Park. Both stores started liquidation sales soon after; Sears Home closed in November, and Sears full-line department store closed on January 8, 2018. Demolition of the latter store commenced in March.

== Transportation ==
Orchard Park Shopping Centre is one of the major transit exchanges in Kelowna. Kelowna Regional Transit System has several routes connecting the shopping centre to the rest of the city. It is also serviced by Cooper Station on the RapidBus, a bus rapid transit line connecting West Kelowna and Downtown Kelowna to UBCO.

== Anchor stores ==
=== Current ===
- Best Buy
- Indigo
- Leon's
- Mark's
- Old Navy
- Shoppers Drug Mart
- Sport Chek
- Structube
- Urban Planet

=== Former ===
- Chapters - converted to Indigo
- Hudson's Bay - closed in 2025
- Sears Home - closed in 2017, converted into Leon's Furniture
- Sears - closed in 2018, demolished 2019
- Walmart - replaced by new mall wing featuring Sport Chek and Old Navy
- Eaton’s - replaced by Sears Home
- Woolco - replaced by Walmart
- Safeway - replaced by Eaton's
- SuperValu - replaced by a few smaller stores, then Chapters

== See also ==
- List of shopping malls in Canada
