= Kelowna Regional Transit System =

Public transportation system in Okanagan Valley, British Columbia, Canada

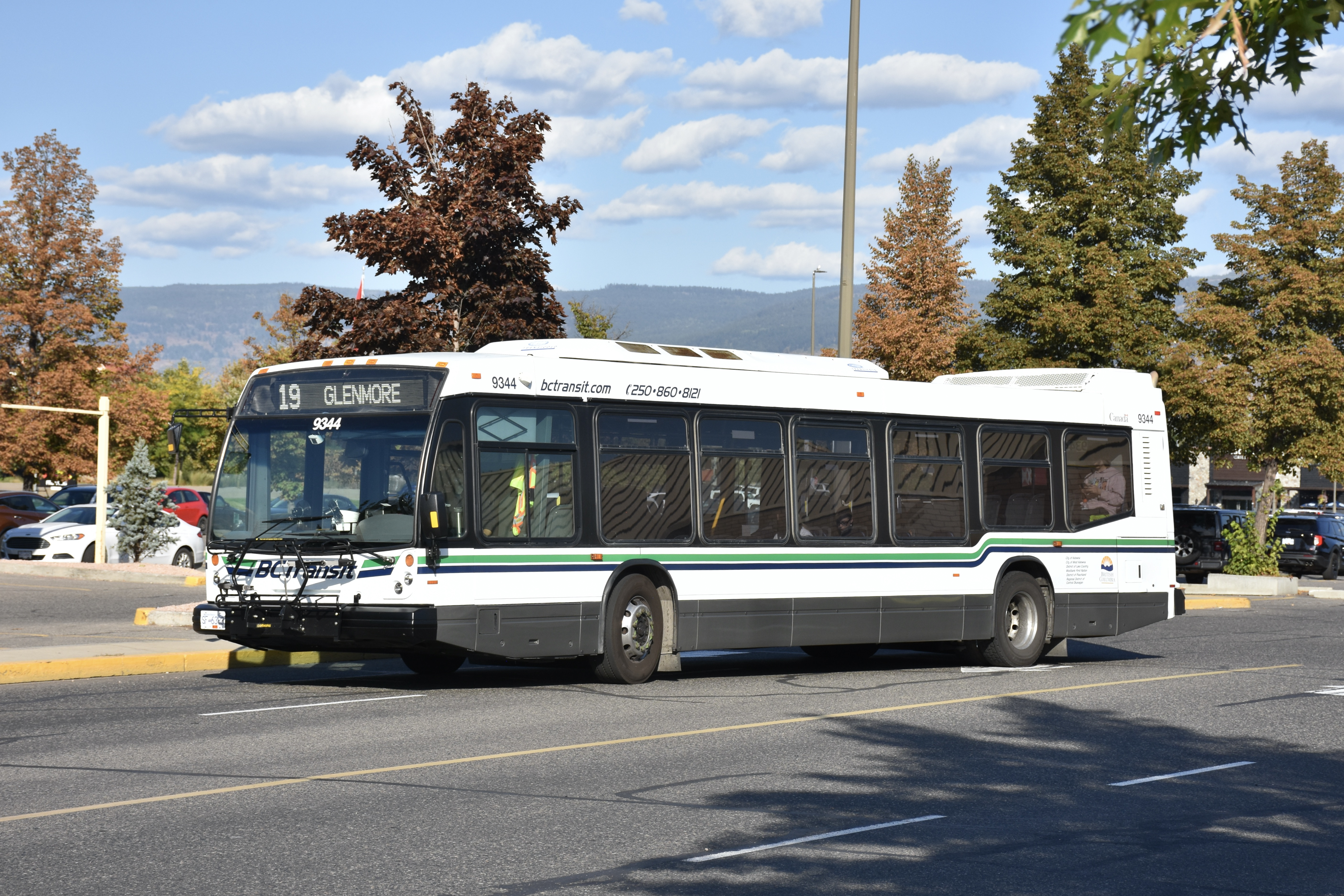
- A refurbished 2009 Nova LFS on route 19 leaving Orchard Park Exchange
- Founded: 1977
- Headquarters: 1494 Hardy Street; Kelowna, British Columbia; V1Y 8H2
- Service area: Central Okanagan
- Service type: Bus service, paratransit
- Alliance: BC Transit
- Routes: 30
- Stops: 968
- Hubs: UBCO, West Bank Exchange, Orchard Park Exchange, Queensway Exchange
- Fleet: 100
- Fuel type: Diesel, electric (2026)
- Operator: Transdev
- Website: www.bctransit.com/kelowna

Kelowna Regional Transit System is operated by Transdev, providing public bus transportation services in part of the central Okanagan Valley of British Columbia, Canada. Funding for the transit system is shared between the City of Kelowna, Regional District of Central Okanagan, District of Lake Country, City of West Kelowna, Westbank First Nation and BC Transit, while the planning and routing decisions are primarily made by Kelowna City Council. Kelowna Regional Transit was one of the first public transit systems in Canada to have double-decker buses, and the first in Canada to have hybrid buses on regular routes. The hybrid and double-decker buses have since been relocated to Victoria.

== Services ==
=== Bus routes ===
There are 29 regularly scheduled routes and a BRT service called RapidBus, connecting Westbank Centre Exchange, downtown Queensway Transit Exchange and UBC Okanagan Exchange. Also, there is one route operated by Vernon Regional Transit and one route operated by South Okanagan-Similkameen Transit within Kelowna Regional Transit's operational area.

No.	Name	Areas Served	Notes
1	Lakeshore	Kelowna	
2	North End Shuttle	Kelowna	
3	Dilworth Mt.	Kelowna	
4	Pandosy Express	Kelowna	Weekday rush hours, September to June only
5	Gordon	Kelowna	
6	Glenmore/UBCO Express	Kelowna	
8	University/College	Kelowna	
9	Shopper Shuttle	Kelowna	
10	North Rutland	Kelowna	
11	Rutland	Kelowna	
12	McCulloch	Kelowna	Community Shuttle Route, Limited service to Orchard Park Mall (Exchange)
13	Quail Ridge	Kelowna	Weekdays, mornings and afternoons only
14	Black Mountain	Kelowna	Community Shuttle Route, Limited service to Orchard Park Mall (Exchange)
15	Crawford	Kelowna	Community Shuttle Route
16	Kettle Valley	Mission	
17	South Ridge	Mission	
18	Glenmore/Downtown	Kelowna	
19	Glenmore/Orchard Park	Kelowna	
20	Lakeview	West Kelowna	
21	Glenrosa	West Kelowna	
22	Peachland	Peachland	Community Shuttle Route
23	Lake Country	Lake Country	Service to Kelowna International Airport; 2 morning southbound Ellison trips (via Old Vernon Road), and 2 afternoon northbound trips.
24	Shannon Ridge	West Kelowna	
25	East Boundary	West Kelowna	Community Shuttle Route
26	Old Okanagan	West Kelowna	Community Shuttle Route
28	Shannon Lake	West Kelowna	Community Shuttle Route, weekdays only
29	Bear Creek	West Kelowna	Community Shuttle Route, weekdays only
32	The Lakes	Lake Country	Community Shuttle Route, Weekdays only
70	Kelowna/Penticton	Penticton	Interregional connector operated by South Okanagan-Similkameen Transit. Weekdays only, four times daily. Requires its own standalone fare. Passes and transfers from both the South Okanagan-Similkameen Regional Transit System and Kelowna Regional Transit System are not accepted.
84	Academy Way	Kelowna	
88	Special	Kelowna	September to June; School Days only.
90	UBCO/Vernon	Vernon	Interregional express route operated by Vernon Regional Transit. Kelowna Regional Transit System fares are accepted on Route 90, but are not valid within the Vernon Regional Transit System.
97	Okanagan	Kelowna/West Kelowna	Bus rapid transit service
98	Rutland/UBCO	Kelowna	

==== RapidBus ====
97 Okanagan is a bus rapid transit service operated by Kelowna Regional Transit System since September 2010. RapidBus expanded its service to West Kelowna on September 2, 2012. Digital screens with real-time schedule information installed at all stops.

97 Okanagan connects West Kelowna, downtown Kelowna and UBC Okanagan via HOV lanes on Highway 97 with traffic signal priority with limited stops to provide fast and direct service.

==== UBCO/Vernon ====
90 UBCO/Vernon is an interregional route connecting UBC Okanagan and downtown Vernon. This route is operated by Vernon Regional Transit, but Kelowna Regional Transit fares apply for travel within Kelowna Regional Transit's operational area. Kelowna Regional Transit passes and transfers are also valid between UBC Okanagan and Oyama.

==== Penticton ====
70 Penticton/Kelowna is an interregional route connecting the South Okanagan to downtown West Kelowna and Kelowna. Northbound buses drop only in West Kelowna (no pickups), and pick up only in downtown Kelowna and West Kelowna on the southbound leg. Fares are separate from Kelowna Regional Transit fares. It is operated by the South Okanagan-Similkameen Transit System.

=== Paratransit ===
HandyDART is a dial-a-ride service for people with a disability that is sufficiently severe that they are unable to use regular transit buses without assistance. Clients must be pre-registered to make use of this service.

=== Bicycle carriers ===
All buses are equipped with bicycle carriers, capable of holding two bikes at a time. Carriers cannot hold tandem or motor-powered bikes. Also, the length of handle bars must be shorter than 69 cm. Bicycles are not allowed on community shuttles before dawn or after sunset, because they would block the headlights.

=== Fleet ===
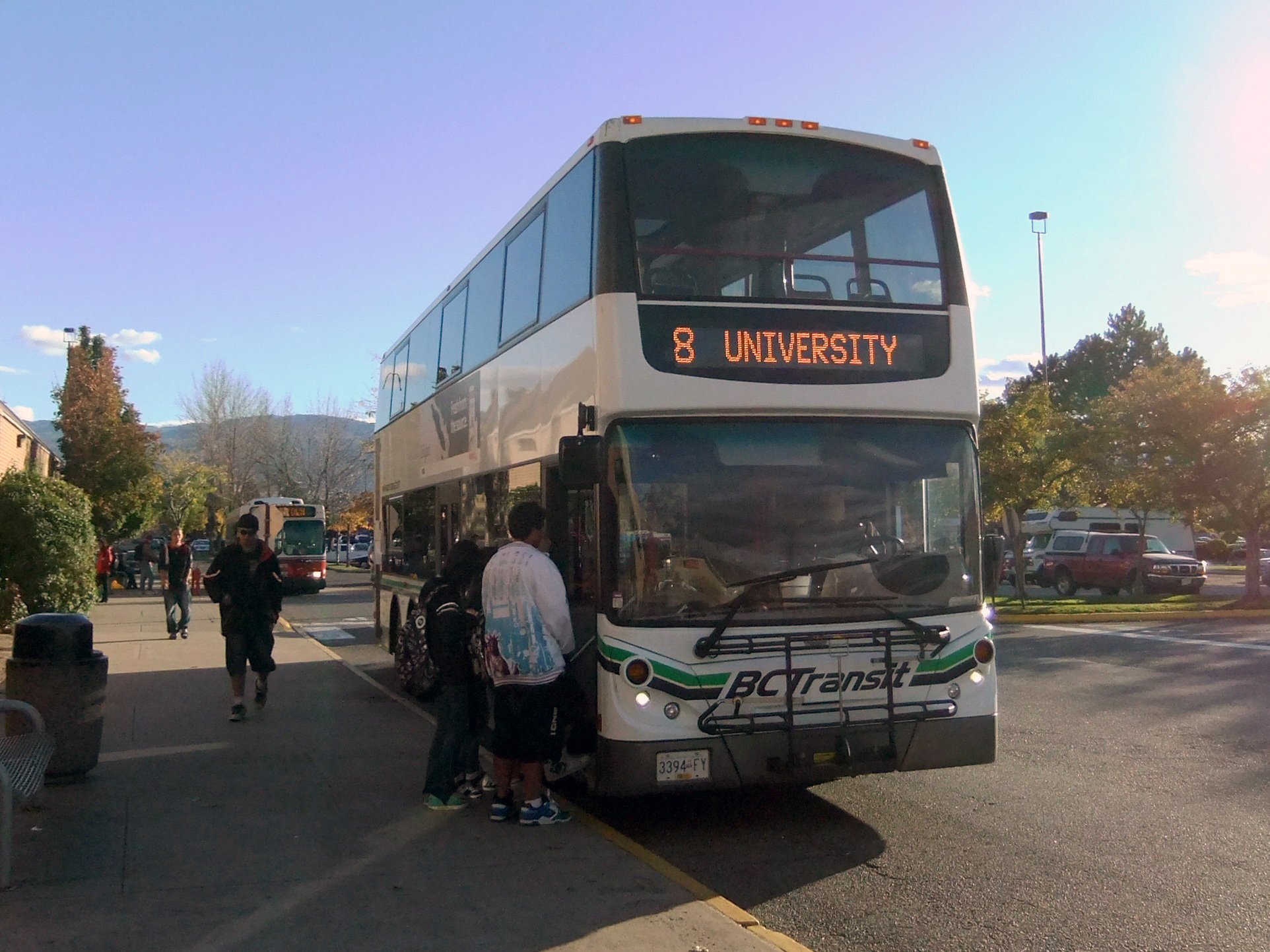

- ARBOC Freedom
- New Flyer Industries D40LF (Retired)
- New Flyer Industries DE40LF (Diesel-Electric Hybrid) (Transfer to Victoria Regional Transit System in September 2012 or January 2013)(First BC Transit system to received hybrid buses)
- Grande West Vicinity
- Dennis Trident (Transferred to Victoria Regional Transit System in Fall 2009)
- Alexander Dennis Enviro500 (Transferred to Victoria Regional Transit System in May 2018)
- Nova Bus LFS

== Proposed changes/improvements ==
=== Future infrastructure ===
Hardy Street Facility to receive 32 electric buses chargers for 22 electric buses along with expanded yard to handle 130 buses.

==== Rutland Exchange ====
The Rutland Exchange is located just north of Highway 33 and between Asher and Dougall Roads. It is a small part of the grand Rutland Town Centre Plan.

Phase 1 of the exchange was completed in September 2013 and currently only the #14 Black Mountain services it. To have routes 8 and 10 service the exchange at this time would be cumbersome and unnecessary.

The future plan, pending negotiations with he Rutland Centennial Park Society, is to extend the exchange and its road, through the park to Rutland Road to allow easy left and right turns onto Rutland Road. At this time, the 8 University, 10 North Rutland, and a potential East Rutland route will be able to service it.

==== RapidBus stations ====
New stations have been constructed on Highway 97 at Gordon Drive, Richter Street, and Butt Road. They are a level-boarding design, similar to the 8 other currently existing stations. With the announcement of the six-laning of Highway 97 from Highway 33 to Edwards Road and the reconfiguration of the Old Vernon/Sexsmith Intersection, a RapidBus Station may be constructed as well as part of the design.

==== Westbank Exchange ====
The new exchange will be built on Elliott Road with saw-toothed bays as part of a larger Westbank Town Centre revitalization. This will move the exchange off of the busy Highway 97 couplet and make way for a potential elimination of the couplet altogether through the Westbank Town Centre.

==== Boucherie Exchange ====
This exchange will replace Stevens Exchange and will be located in the vicinity of Bartley Road and Highway 97. More precisely, it will be located in the field next to the Super 8 on Westgate Road, and will include a Park n' Ride facility. Eastbound buses will pull in directly off the highway (similar to the RapidBus stations in Kelowna) and Westbound buses will route along Westgate Road to a similar RapidBus station. At implementation, the select few 97 Express trips along Ross and Cameron will likely stay on Highway 97 to make for routing reliability.

==== Queensway Exchange ====
When Queensway Exchange was built in 1998, underground utilities were installed for the construction of a future building on the transit island. The vision is to build a building down the middle which can include waiting areas, a security office, and perhaps a coffee shop. The new $5.6 million Queensway transit exchange opened on April 26, 2015, and includes an all-weather wood structure above the existing transit island platform.

== Fares ==
Kelowna Regional Transit fares operate under a single zone system within the Regional District of Central Okanagan. A transfer slip is issued upon request, which allows unlimited travel on the system for up to 90 minutes from the time of fare payment.
