= Summit Pass =

Summit Pass may refer to:

- Summit Pass (Antarctica), a pass in the Tabarin Peninsula, Antarctica
- Summit Pass (British Columbia)
- Summit Pass (Colorado), a place in Colorado
- Summit Pass (Oregon)
