= British Columbia Highway 39 =

Highway in British Columbia

Highway 39
- Mackenzie Highway

Route information
- Maintained by the Ministry of Transportation and Infrastructure
- Length: 29 km (18 mi)

Major junctions
- Southeast end: Highway 97 north of McLeod Lake
- Northwest end: Mackenzie

Location
- Country: Canada
- Province: British Columbia

Highway system
- British Columbia provincial highways
← Highway 37A	→ Highway 41

Highway 39 is a minor 29 km (19 mi) long spur route in the Regional District of Fraser-Fort George. It runs from a point on the John Hart Highway just north of Tudyah Lake northwest to the town of Mackenzie, near the southern arm of Williston Lake. Highway 39 and the town of Mackenzie were both built in the 1960s as a measure of support for workers on the construction project of the W. A. C. Bennett Dam (which is not on the same arm of Williston Lake as Mackenzie). The road did not gain its '39' designation until 1975.

== Major intersections ==
The entire route is in Fraser-Fort George Regional District.

Location	km	mi	Destinations	Notes
	0.00	0.00	Highway 97 – Dawson Creek, Prince George	Highway 39 southern terminus
Mackenzie	36.33	22.57	Columbia Drive	Highway 39 northern terminus; continues north as forest service road
1.000 mi = 1.609 km; 1.000 km = 0.621 mi
