= RapidBus =

RapidBus may refer to:

- RapidBus (TransLink), an express bus network in Metro Vancouver, British Columbia, Canada
- 97X Kelowna RapidBus, a bus rapid transit line in Central Okanagan, British Columbia, Canada
- Rapibus, a bus rapid transit system in Gatineau, Quebec, Canada
- Rapid Bus, a bus transit operator in Kuala Lumpur, Malaysia

== See also ==
- Bus rapid transit
