= Summit Lake, British Columbia =

Summit Lake
- Location of Summit Lake in British Columbia
- Coordinates: 54°14′59″N 122°38′05″W
- Country: Canada
- Province: British Columbia
- Area code: 250 / 778 / 236
- Highways: Highway 97

Summit Lake is an unincorporated community in the Central Interior of British Columbia, Canada, located north of the City of Prince George on the John Hart Highway at the lake of the same name. The community of McLeod Lake (Fort McLeod) is a few miles further to the north. Summit Lake is situated at the divide between the Fraser and Peace, which means it is also at the divide between the Pacific and Arctic drainages. As such, it is also the location of the prominence col for Mount Orizaba, in relation to Denali. This makes it one of the lowest locations along the Continental Divide of North America north of Mexico (elevation 710 m (2329 ft).
