= Summit Lake (Crooked River) =

Lake in British Columbia, Canada; drained by Crooked River

- Location within British Columbia
- Location: Central Interior of British Columbia
- Coordinates: 54°17′19″N 122°39′35″W
- Primary outflows: Crooked River
- Basin countries: Canada
- Surface elevation: 710 m (2,330 ft)

Summit Lake, elevation 710 m (2329 ft), is a lake in the Central Interior of British Columbia, Canada, located to the north of the city of Prince George. It is the namesake of the community of the same name, which lies alongside the John Hart Highway to the south of the community of McLeod Lake (Fort McLeod). It is at the head of the Crooked River, which flows north to McLeod Lake.

Summit Lake is situated at the divide between the Fraser and Peace basins and so is at the divide between the Pacific and Arctic drainages. As such, it is also the location of the prominence col for Pico de Orizaba, in relation to Denali, meaning also that it is one of the lowest locations along the Continental Divide of North America north of Mexico.

== See also ==
- List of lakes of British Columbia
