= Crooked River Provincial Park =

Provincial park in British Columbia, Canada

- IUCN category II (national park)
- Location within British Columbia
- Interactive map of Crooked River Provincial Park
- Location: Cariboo Land District, British Columbia, Canada
- Nearest city: Prince George, BC
- Coordinates: 54°28′29″N 122°41′00″W
- Area: 970 ha (2,400 acres)
- Established: October 5, 1965
- Governing body: BC Parks

Crooked River Provincial Park is a 970-hectare provincial park in British Columbia, Canada. The park, named after the Crooked River, was established in 1965. It is located approximately 70 km north of Prince George, along Highway 97, and close to the town of Bear Lake.
