= 97X Kelowna RapidBus =

Bus rapid transit line in Canada

97 Okanagan TO: (WESTBANK) (QUEENSWAY) (UBCO EXCH)
- Okanagan; Kelowna RapidBus

Overview
- System: Kelowna Regional Transit System
- Operator: FirstCanada
- Garage: Hardy
- Vehicle: Nova Bus LFS 40'
- Status: Active
- Began service: 2010
- Predecessors: 97 Rutland Express
- Night-time: Friday and Saturday (September through April)

Route
- Locale: Central Okanagan
- Communities served: Kelowna, West Kelowna
- Start: UBC Okanagan Exchange
- Via: Highway 97; Downtown Queensway; William R. Bennett Bridge
- End: Westbank Centre Downtown Queensway Transit Exchange (97 Okanagan TO QUEENSWAY)
- Length: 14 km (Queensway run) 27 km (Westbank run)

Service
- Level: Daily
- Frequency: Every 7-30 minutes (September through April); Every 15-30 minutes (Summer) West Kelowna every 60 minutes (late night)
- Weekend frequency: Every 30 minutes West Kelowna every 60 minutes (late night)
- Journey time: 20-30 minutes (Queensway Run) 43-52 minutes (Westbank Run)
- Operates: 6:00 am - 12:00 am (2am Fri-Sat September through April)

97 Express Kelowna RapidBus or 97 Okanagan is a bus rapid transit line operated by Kelowna Regional Transit System since September 2010 in Central Okanagan, British Columbia, Canada. The service connects UBC Okanagan Exchange, Downtown Kelowna and Westbank Centre. 97X RapidBus offers high speed bus service by utilizing traffic signal priority and HOV lanes on Highway 97.

== 97 Okanagan RapidBus stops ==
97 Okanagan RapidBus connects West Kelowna, downtown Kelowna and UBC Okanagan via HOV lanes on Highway 97 with traffic signal priority with the following limited stops from north to south:

- UBC Okanagan Exchange - The northern terminus of the line. Serves UBC's Okanagan campus and provide connections to #23 and #90 routes running further north to Kelowna International Airport, Lake Country and City of Vernon
- Sexsmith Station
- McCurdy Station - Serves McCurdy and North Rutland neighbourhoods. #10 stop located in close proximity.
- Banks Station - Serves Walmart Supercentre. #8 and #10 stops located in close proximity.
- Cooper Station (Orchard Park Exchange) - Serves Orchard Park Shopping Centre and provide connections for buses serving Rutland, Glenmore and Pandosy neighbourhoods.
- Parkinson Station - Serves Parkinson Recreation Park and Landmark Office Towers. Inbound and outbound stops are connected by Dayton Overpass over Highway 97.
- Gordon Station - This stop was added on April 27, 2014. Serves Capri Centre and connects to #5 Gordon route.
- Richter Station - This stop was added on April 27, 2014. Serves southern end of Downtown Kelowna.
- Queensway Transit Exchange - Serves Downtown Kelowna and provide connections for buses serving Okanagan College, Mission, Glenmore and North End.
- Westside Station - Serves Okanagan Lake Shopping Centre.
- Westlake-Hudson Station - This stop was added on November 30, 2014.
- Boucherie Mountain Exchange - Serves West Kelowna Municipal Hall and Mount Boucherie Senior Secondary School. Provide connections to local routes serving West Kelowna.
- Butt Station - Serves Butt Road and surrounding strip malls.
- Westbank Centre Exchange - The southern terminus of the line. Serves Downtown Westbank. Provide connections to local route serving Glenrosa and #22 route running further south to Peachland.

== Amenities ==
Unenclosed bus shelters are installed at all stops on Highway 97 in Kelowna and West Kelowna. An enclosed weatherproof shelter with on-demand heaters is installed at UBC Okanagan Exchange Bus shelters are planned to be installed in West Kelowna.

All completed RapidBus stops on Highway 97 are raised to match with the height of the bus floors, allowing faster boarding and wheelchair users to enter or exit bus without using ramp. Stops are designed to minimize the gap between bus and curb. Only Nova Buses are compatible with this set-up since double deckers and New Flyers are low-floor and will not be used for liability and practicality purposes. FRP plank is attached to the curve, allowing buses to contact the curb without damaging or scratching the vehicle. Tactile pavings are installed at all raised stops on Highway 97. Digital screens with real-time schedule information are installed at all stops as well. Most 97 Okanagan Nova Buses are equipped with a public announcement system featuring the same familiar voice announcing the Route upon entering the bus, and next stop, final stop announcements inside the bus. Inside the bus there is also an electronic sign that displays the Route when the doors open, then the next stop when the door closes, and will alternate between the next stop, and stop requested once someone requests a stop.

== History ==
97 Express was originally created to connect Orchard Park Shopping Centre, Rutland and the current UBC Okanagan Exchange via Enterprise Way and Highway 33. In September 2010, the first phase of Kelowna RapidBus service was announced connecting UBC Okanagan Exchange and the Downtown Queensway Exchange in Kelowna via Highway 97, replacing the old 97 Express serving Rutland via Highway 33. The Southbound McCurdy stop did not have a shelter or curb until late 2011.

RapidBus expanded its service to West Kelowna on September 2, 2012, although the Westside stop was the only dedicated RapidBus stop. The route diverted from Highway 97 at several intersections to serve local stops. Infrastructure upgrades started in 2013 to further expand RapidBus service. The Gordon and Richter stops in Kelowna were opened on April 27, 2014 and express service was extended to West Kelowna on August 31, 2014.
