= Testalinden Creek =

Coordinates: 49°7′28″N 119°34′19″W

Location of Okanagan Creek south of Oliver, BC

Testalinden Creek is a watercourse that flows east into the Okanagan River, south of the Okanagan town of Oliver, British Columbia. The Testalinden Dam was at the headwaters of this creek prior to the dam's failure in June 2010.

== Disasters ==
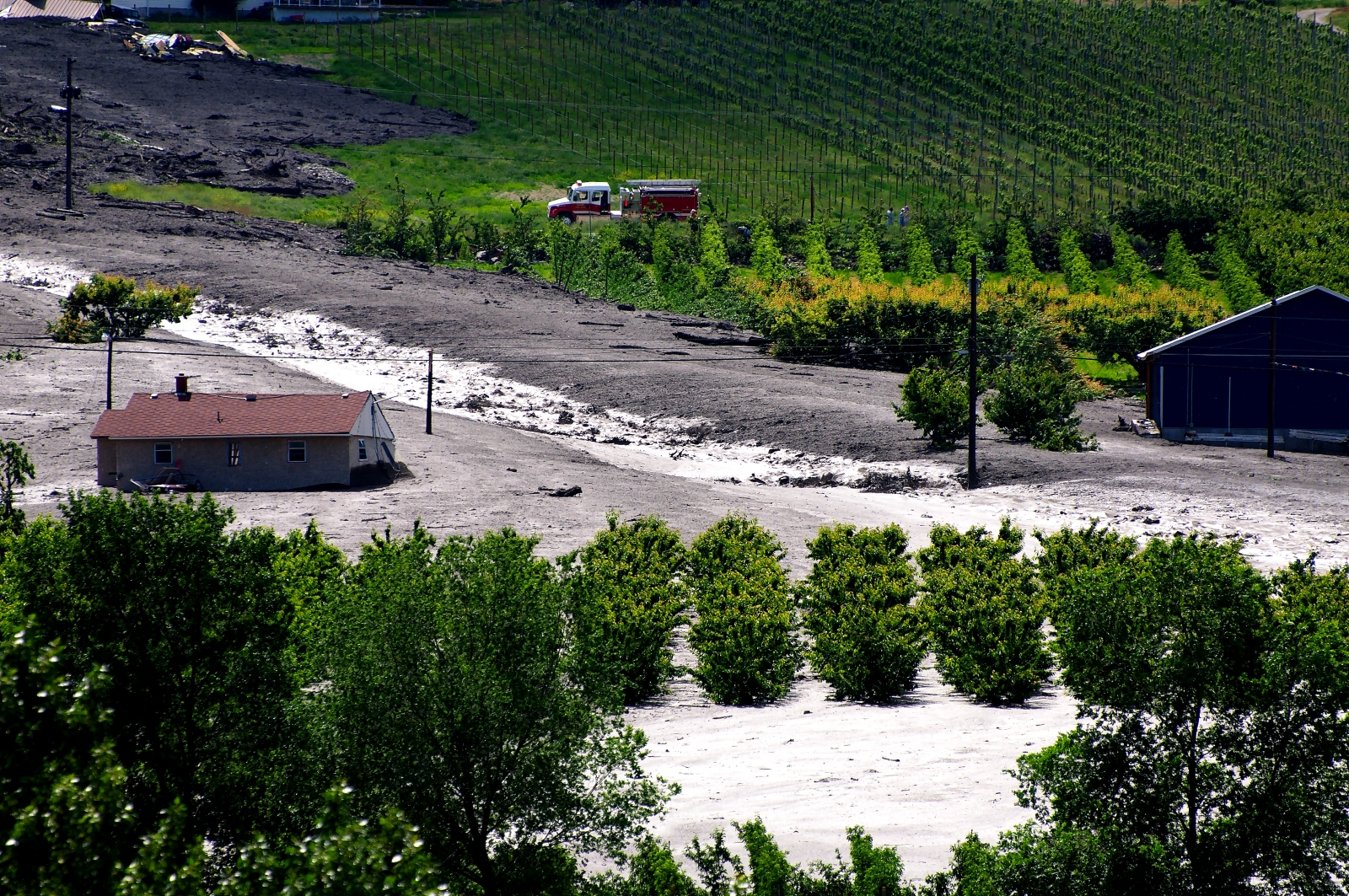
A vineyard near Oliver, BC after the June, 2010 mudslide

The dam at Testalinden Lake located near the summit of Mt. Kobau burst on June 13, 2010 at around 2:15 pm creating a debris torrent landslide that descended about 1500 m to the valley below, destroying 5 houses, damaging several farms and blocking British Columbia Highway 97. The overall damages were estimated to be over CAD$20 million. The dam was constructed in 1927 and was in poor maintenance at the time of failure. Two days before the breach, a hiker noted that Testalinden Lake was full and the dam was overtopping. After a surge of snowmelt, the dam failed, releasing approximately 20,000 m^{3} of water into the Okanagan Valley, which led to a debris flow with a volume of more than 200,000 m^{3}. Traffic was detoured around the debris on the highway for several days as the highway was repaired. Additionally, two of Oliver's water mains were affected by the slide, resulting in 10 homes and 750 acres of farmland losing access to water. Testalinden Creek was later rehabilitated by returning it to its former channel, which was heavily armoured with rock.

On August 14, 2015, lightning caused a large wildfire in the Testalinden Creek area. Strong winds quickly spread the fire, which burned 5,202 hectares over the course of a month.
