= Pack River (British Columbia) =

Watercourse in British Columbia, Canada

Location
- Country: Canada

Physical characteristics
- Source
  - coordinates: 55°9′0″N 123°7′1″W
- Length: 30 km (19 mi)

The Pack River is a river in the North-Central Interior of British Columbia, Canada, flowing north into the Parsnip Reach of Lake Williston. Part of the Peace River drainage, it was originally a tributary of the Parsnip River before the creation of Lake Williston by the building of WAC Bennett Dam. It is fed by the McLeod River via McLeod Lake.

== See also ==
- List of rivers in British Columbia
