= Prince George Airport =

Airport serving Prince George, British Columbia, Canada

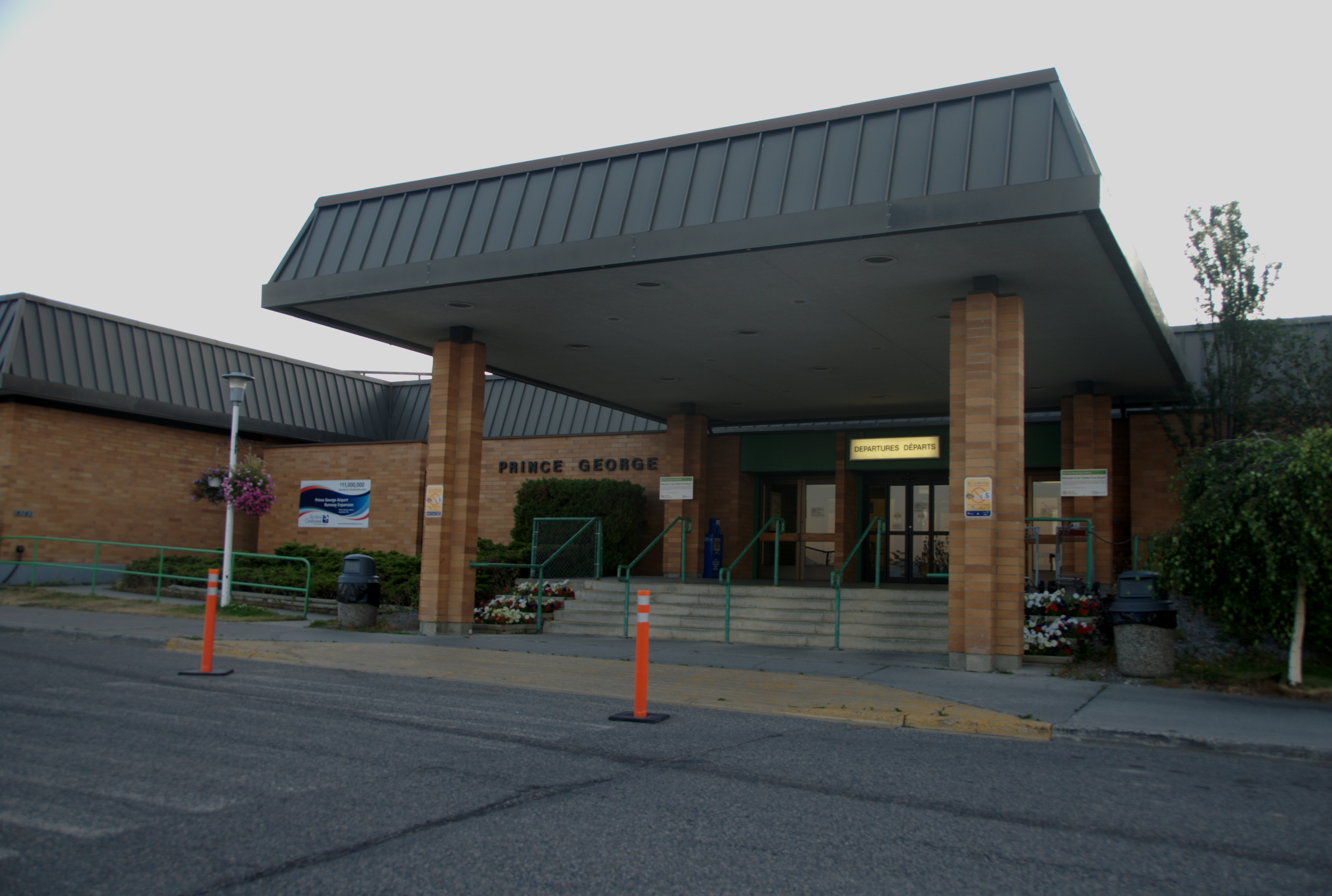
- IATA: YXS; ICAO: CYXS; WMO: 71896

Summary
- Airport type: Public
- Owner: Transport Canada
- Operator: Prince George Airport Authority
- Serves: Prince George, British Columbia
- Time zone: MST (UTC−07:00)
- Elevation AMSL: 2,266 ft (691 m)
- Coordinates: 53°53′03″N 122°40′39″W
- Website: www.pgairport.ca

Map
- Location in British Columbia CYXS (Canada)

Runways
Direction	Length		Surface
Direction	m	ft	Surface
01/19	1,038	3,406	Asphalt
06/24	1,714	5,624	Asphalt
15/33	3,490	11,450	Asphalt

Statistics (2014)
- Aircraft movements: 43,865
- Source: Canada Flight Supplement; Environment Canada; Movements from Statistics Canada

Prince George Airport (IATA: YXS, ICAO: CYXS) is an airport located in Prince George, British Columbia, serving the city of Prince George and the surrounding area. The airport is operated by the Prince George Airport Authority.

The airport offers scheduled flights to Vancouver, Calgary, and Victoria on Air Canada Express, WestJet Encore, Central Mountain Air, and Pacific Coastal Airlines. WestJet also has one daily scheduled flight to Calgary. Central Mountain Air also has scheduled and charter services to many points in northern and central British Columbia as well as Edmonton. WestJet flies a weekly non-stop flight to Puerto Vallarta, Mexico from November through to April.

The airport is classified as an airport of entry by Nav Canada and is staffed by the Canada Border Services Agency (CBSA). The airport can handle aircraft with up to 30 passengers or 120 if they are unloaded in stages.

== History ==
The airport opened in 1920, and until 1932, the site was the bypass highway that ran from Tenth Avenue to Eighteenth Avenue. The airport served as a stopover for aircraft including United States Army Junkers JL-4's and de Havilland Fours going to Alaska. In 1932, the airport was moved to the intersections of Highway 97 and Highway 16, near Carney Hill (the same site is now the Prince George Golf and Curling Club). At this second, newer airport, US planes also flew in large numbers to Alaska prior to the United States declaring war on Japan. Planes seen included Douglas B-18's and Martin B-10's. This airport was used until about 1942 and was closed for good on March 31, 1944. During the 1930s and early 1940s, it contained Pineview Elementary School, which was renamed the Airport School.

In approximately 1942 the aerodrome was listed as D of T Aerodrome (old)- Prince George, British Columbia at 53°54′N 122°46′W with a variation of 28 degrees E and elevation of 1,900 ft (579 m). The aerodrome was listed with two runways as follows:

Runway name	Length	Width	Surface
N/S	4,800 ft (1,463 m)	500 ft (152 m)	Gravel
NE/SW	2,300 ft (701 m)	500 ft (152 m)	Gravel

On November 14, 1940, the Canadian-American Permanent Joint Board of Defence set out a need for multiple new northwest airports, including Prince George, to support the new Northwest Staging Route. This new staging route would provide protection, permit aircraft to be deployed rapidly to northwestern Canada and Alaska in time of emergency and allow men and supplies to be moved into the region by air.

In late 1940, Canada's Department of National Defence contracted to build a new (third) Prince George airport on a bench at the top of the hill about 3 mi (4.8 km) south-east of the city on the old Cariboo Highway, across from the Federal Government's Experimental Farm. This location is now the site of today's airport. The Department of Transport built single family homes, an unmarried staff residence, a diesel electric power plant and vehicle maintenance garage. A small administration building and radio range station was built by Pan American World Airways (Pan Am) and a few years later (1944) this was replaced by a new, larger DOT administration/radio range terminal and a large hangar was built (it burned down in 2009) about the same time. The resident DOT staff were housed on the airport and the Pan Am staff were accommodated in houses built on the east side of the old Cariboo highway, across from the airport.

In 1942, the United States Army Air Forces started construction on a number of buildings for their staff and for Royal Canadian Air Force staff, including troop dormitories, a medical clinic, a gymnasium and a cafeteria. The latter was also used for USO shows and movies for airport staff. The US staff component included an Army Airways Communication Station, an Eleventh Air Force detachment (1452nd AAF Base Unit - detached from Edmonton Municipal) and a small detachment of United States Navy staff. The US Navy had a contract with Pan Am to fly men, equipment and everything else from Seattle to Juneau and Fairbanks via Prince George and on to Kodiak (Naval Air Station Kodiak), Dutch Harbor (Dutch Harbor Naval Operating Base), Adak (Naval Air Facility Adak) and back in periods when coastal weather conditions were poor. The Eleventh Air Force's 1452nd Base Unit at Prince George airport were Air Transport Command, charged with facilitating aircraft and supply shipments from the contiguous United States to Alaska on the Northwest Staging Route.

The new airport comprised 2,034 acres (823 ha), was completed on August 9, 1945, and had three runways arranged in a triangle. In 1941, after the completion of runway 14/32 (now 15/33), US-based Pan Am operated from the Prince George Airport as a stopover location on its Seattle to Fairbanks route ferrying men and equipment for the US Navy. In 1942, Canadian Pacific Air Lines (CP Air) began offering scheduled flights six times a week into Prince George. Canadian Pacific and its successor Canadian Airlines International served the airport for many years. Between 1942 and 1944, the airport was used as an alternate airport (to Edmonton Municipal) by the United States Army Air Forces (USAAF) for United States to the Soviet Union Lend-Lease aircraft flown primarily from Great Falls, Montana to Alaska and on to the Soviet Union. Planes seen in the new Prince George airport were mostly P-39 Airacobras, P-63 Kingcobras, B-25 Mitchell bombers, and C-47 Skytrain transports. Also seen were RCAF Hawker Hurricanes and Bristol Fairchild Bolingbroke bombers.

In approximately 1942 the aerodrome was listed as RCAF Aerodrome - Prince George (new), British Columbia at 53°54′N 122°40′W with a variation of 28 degrees E and elevation of 2,225 ft (678 m). The aerodrome was listed as "Under construction - Field Serviceable" with three runways as follows:

Runway name	Length	Width	Surface
18/36	5,525 ft (1,684 m)	150 ft (46 m)	Hard surfaced
14/32	5,800 ft (1,768 m)	150 ft (46 m)	Hard surfaced
5/23	4,000 ft (1,219 m)	150 ft (46 m)	Hard surfaced

During the Second World War, the RCAF operated the airport in close assistance with the Department of Transport and the USAAF. In 1946, with the war over, the airport was turned over to the Department of Transport by the RCAF and the USAAF and RCAF buildings were torn down, leaving the DOT buildings and homes as well as the Pan Am housing. These lasted until the early 1950s when they were either moved or torn down. The hangar was used until 2009 and the DOT Admin building - terminal was replaced with a new, modern terminal in 1973.

In the mid-1940s, the Airport School was re-established at Prince George Airport and served resident Department of Transportation children and children from neighbouring farms until the early 1950s. The school had up to three teachers and up to twenty-five students in grades one to six, at various times.

Over the years, Canadian Pacific operated twin engine propeller aircraft such as the Lockheed Lodestar, the Douglas DC-3, the Convair 240, and the larger, four engine Douglas DC-6B and Bristol Britannia. In 1953, the first lights were installed along runway 14/32 (now 15/33). Later that year, a United States Air Force B-29 Superfortress made an emergency landing at the airport.

Prince George Airport was commercialized in 1963 when Mrs. P. Richardson opened the first coffee shop in the terminal. Wildlife such as moose or deer can be seen occasionally from the runway. During the WW2 years, wildlife near the airport was largely wiped out due to airport soldiers hunting in their free time.

During the 1970s, CP Air operated jet service with the Boeing 737-200 to Vancouver, Fort St. John and Whitehorse as well as direct, no change of plane service to Edmonton, Grande Prairie, Fort Nelson and Watson Lake. CP Air also operated non-stop Boeing 727-100 jet service from Vancouver as well as direct 727 jet service from Edmonton via a stop in Grande Prairie during the mid 1970s in addition to its Boeing 737 jet services at this time. Pacific Western Airlines also served Prince George at this time with Boeing 737-200 jet service to Vancouver, Edmonton, Kamloops and Dawson Creek, and de Havilland Canada DHC-6 Twin Otter turboprop and Douglas DC-3 flights to Kelowna, Penticton, Prince Rupert, Smithers, Terrace, Quesnel and Williams Lake. CP Air and Pacific Western would continue to compete with non-stop service to Vancouver into the 1980s with both airlines flying Boeing 737-200 on the route. Pacific Western acquired CP Air and the combined airlines then operated as Canadian Airlines International.

Between 2003–2005, the airport underwent a significant expansion and revitalization that included the addition of more check-in counters, larger pre-board screening and holding areas, new baggage carousels, and a border control facility for international flights.

On November 17, 2009, a Southern Air Boeing 747 aircraft landed at Prince George Airport, as part of a refuelling stop. This resulted from a runway expansion which increased the length of runway 15/33 from 7,400 ft (2,300 m) to 11,450 ft (3,490 m) – the third longest runway in Canada, behind Calgary International (14,000 ft [4,300 m]) and Vancouver International (11,500 ft [3,500 m]). On December 19, 2009, a fire destroyed the Northern Thunderbird Air terminal with no loss of life The airline stated that operations would continue as normal despite the setback.

On July 13, 2012, an Antonov-124 landed to pick up 7 helicopters from VIH Helicopters en route to Luanda, Angola. The aircraft returned to Prince George three months later with the helicopters.

In February 2015, Prince George hosted the 2015 Canada Winter Games. Approximately 15,000 people came to the city by air for the games. The airport also built a 25,000 sq ft (2,300 m^{2}) cargo warehouse, which is currently operated primarily by Rosenau Trucking Ltd.

== Airlines and destinations ==
Airlines	Destinations
Air Canada Express	Vancouver
Central Mountain Air	Calgary, Edmonton, Fort Nelson, Kelowna, Terrace/Kitimat
Pacific Coastal Airlines	Kelowna, Victoria
WestJet	Seasonal: Puerto Vallarta
WestJet Encore	Calgary, Vancouver

== Cargo ==
Airlines	Destinations
KF Cargo	Kamloops, Vancouver
Central Mountain Air	Kamloops, Vancouver

== See also ==
- Prince George (North Cariboo Air Park) Airport

== Notes ==
1. The Forgotten War, Volume 1, Stan Cohen, publ April 1990, pg 10
2. The Forgotten War, Volume 2, Stan Cohen, Publ March 2002, pg 121
3. History of Canadian Airports, T.M. McGrath, Publ April 1984 by Transport Canada, pgs 175-177
4. Army Air force units in Alaska (11th Air Force)
5. World War II Aviation in Prince George, BC, College of New Caledonia Oral history Series, Pan_Am and All That, compiled by J. Kent Sedgwick, Publ 2008
6. US Army in World War II, Military Relations Between US & Canada, Stanley W. Deviaban, Chapter VIII, Activities in Western Canada, pgs 200-203.
