= Old Cariboo Highway =

Road in British Columbia, Canada

- Location: Prince George
- Length: 10.1 km (6.3 mi)

The Old Cariboo Highway is a portion of the historic Cariboo Highway near Prince George, British Columbia, Canada. It runs northward from its junction with Highway 97 just south of Prince George, and terminates at Highway 16 (Yellowhead Highway) just east of Prince George. It is formerly signed as Highway 97A. The 6.4-kilometre (4.0 mi) section outside of Prince George city limits is provincial maintained and known as Unsigned Highway 909:1156.

Traffic along the Old Cariboo Highway is light and it serves primarily as the main road for the Pineview area of Prince George, passing next to Pineview Elementary School and the Prince George Airport.

Highway 97A formerly continued through Prince George from Old Cariboo Highway, following the Yellowhead Highway for 6 kilometres (3.7 mi) into downtown Prince George, continued along 1st Avenue and the Cameron Street Bridge across the Nechako River, reconnecting Highway 97 just north of the river. The route was part of original Highway 97 through Prince George and the designation was dropped in c. 2000.

== Major intersections ==
The entire route is in Fraser-Fort George Regional District.

Location	km	mi	Destinations	Notes
	0.00	0.00	Highway 97 (Cariboo Highway) – Prince George, Quesnel, Vancouver	Southern terminus; Unsigned Highway 909:1156 southern terminus; former Highway 97A southern terminus
Prince George	6.40	3.98	Prince George city limits	Unsigned Highway 909:1156 northern terminus
Prince George	10.10	6.28	Highway 16 (TCH/YH) to Highway 97 north – Jasper, Edmonton, Dawson Creek	Northern terminus; former south end of Highway 16 / Highway 97A concurrency
Prince George	14.26	8.86	Yellowhead Bridge crosses the Fraser River	
Prince George	16.22	10.08	Highway 16 (TCH/YH) west (Victoria Street) – Prince Rupert, Vancouver	Former north end of Highway 16 / Highway 97A concurrency
Prince George	18.20	11.31	Cameron Street Bridge crosses the Nechako River	
Prince George	18.60	11.56	Highway 97 (John Hart Highway) – Vancouver, Dawson Creek	Former Highway 97A northern terminus
1.000 mi = 1.609 km; 1.000 km = 0.621 mi: Closed/former; Route transition

== See also ==
- Cariboo Highway
- Cariboo Road
- Old Cariboo Road
