= Summit Pass (British Columbia) =

Mountain pass in British Columbia, Canada

- Location within British Columbia
- Elevation: 1,267 m (4,157 ft)
- Traversed by: Highway 97 (Alaska Highway)

Third Approach
- Location: British Columbia, Canada
- Range: Canadian Rockies
- Coordinates: 58°38′39″N 124°42′04″W
- Topo map: NTS 94K10 Mount St. George

Summit Pass (el. 1,305 m or 4,281 ft) is a high mountain pass in the Northern Canadian Rockies in the province of British Columbia. It is one of two passes the Alaska Highway utilizes to cut westwards across ranges of the Rocky Mountain System; further north is the lower Muncho Pass.
