= South Okanagan-Similkameen Transit System =

Transit system in Okanagan, British Columbia

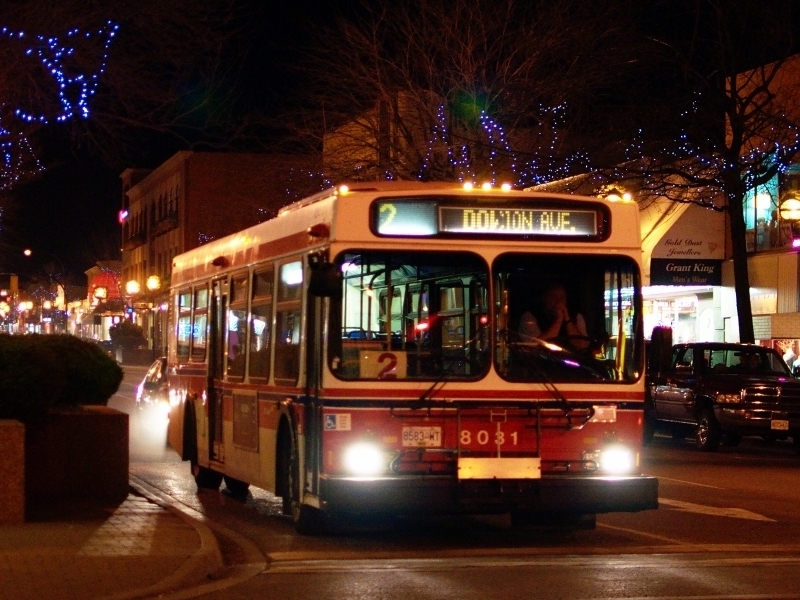
- Headquarters: 301 Warren Avenue East
- Locale: RDOS, BC
- Service type: bus service, paratransit
- Alliance: BC Transit
- Fuel type: Diesel
- Operator: Berry & Smith
- Website: www.bctransit.com/south-okanagan-similkameen/

South Okanagan-Similkameen Transit provides local public, regional, and interregional transportation services in the City of Penticton in the Okanagan Valley of British Columbia, Canada, and outlying communities, with a fleet of fully accessible low floor transit buses. The system consists of six scheduled routes serving the city (including night service), and routes stemming to outlying communities including Summerland, Naramata, Princeton, and Osoyoos. lw

== Routes ==
=== Scheduled services ===
Route	Route Name	Type	Areas Served	Scheduling	Notes
1	Okanagan Lake/Wilse	Local	Penticton	Monday-Saturday	
2	Westside/Penticton Ave.	Local	Penticton	Monday-Saturday	
3	Uplands/Skaha Lake	Local	Penticton	Monday-Saturday	
4	Westside/Duncan East	Local	Penticton	Monday-Saturday	
5	Main Street	Local	Penticton	Monday-Sunday	
10	Naramata	Local/Regional	Penticton, Naramata	Monday-Saturday	
11	West Bench	Local/Regional	Penticton, West Bench	Monday-Friday	Service introduced January 2022 as a new route to serve the community of West Bench
15	Night Route	Local	Penticton	Monday-Saturday	Last service at 10:05PM
16	Lake-to-Lake	Local	Penticton	Sundays/Holidays	Extra service during summer
20	Okanagan Falls	Local/Regional	Penticton, Okanagan Falls	Monday-Friday	
21	Okanagan Falls Local	Local	Okanagan Falls	Monday-Friday	
30	Summerland	Local/Regional	Summerland, Trout Creek, Penticton	Monday-Saturday	
40	Osoyoos	Local/Regional	Kaleden, Okanagan Falls, Oliver, Osoyoos	Monday-Friday	Kaleden on request only
41	Osoyoos Local	Local	Osoyoos	Monday-Friday	
50	Princeton	Regional	Coalmont, Princeton, Hedley, Keremeos, Cawston, Olalla, Penticton	Monday, Wednesday, Friday	Reservations required, Coalmont and Cawston on request only
70	Kelowna	Interegional	Penticton, Summerland, Westbank, Kelowna	Monday to Friday	Service introduced September 2019, replaces 60 Kelowna.

=== Former routes ===
In September 2019, Route 60 Kelowna was cancelled in favour of a twice daily (four times on Monday) commuter service (Route 70) in both directions on weekdays. The route was expanded to four trips each weekday in January 2022. The former route operated only on Mondays.

Route	Route Name	Type	Areas Served	Scheduling	Notes
60	Kelowna	Interregional	Osoyoos to Kelowna	Mondays	
