= McLeod River (British Columbia) =

Coordinates: 54°59′00″N 123°02′00″W

The McLeod River is a river in the Central Interior of British Columbia, Canada, flowing northeast into the north end of McLeod Lake.

== See also ==
- List of rivers of British Columbia
