= Vernon Regional Transit System =

Transit system in North Okanagan, British Columbia, Canada

- Founded: 1978
- Locale: Greater Vernon
- Service area: Regional District of North Okanagan
- Service type: Transit bus, paratransit
- Alliance: BC Transit
- Routes: 13 (9 local, 3 regional, 1 operated by other system.)
- Operator: TransDev Canada
- Website: Vernon Regional Transit

The Vernon Regional Transit System provides bus service to destinations in Vernon, Coldstream and the North Okanagan area of British Columbia, using fully accessible low floor transit buses.

This transit system is responsible for all local full-service and handyDART public bus transportation, in cooperation with the provincial agency BC Transit. Currently, the Vernon Regional Transit System operates a combination of twelve local and regional routes, with a thirteenth route operated by Shuswap Regional Transit servicing Vernon as well.

== Operations ==
=== Fares ===
Current fares in the Vernon Regional Transit System are provided in the table below:

| | Children (18 and under) | Adults | Concession Rate |
|---|---|---|---|
| Cash Fare (except Route 90) | Free | $3.00 | |
| Cash Fare (Route 90) | Free | $6.00 (DayPASS not valid) | |
| DayPASS | Free | $6.00 | |
| 10 Rides | Free | Discontinued effective October 1 ,2026 | |
| 30-Day Pass | Free | $65.00 | $80.00 |
Source: BC Transit

BC Transit also provides a discounted Semester Pass to full-time secondary and post-secondary students for $120.00. Students may purchase Semester Passes from specific retailers with valid student ID.

Children 12 and under are permitted aboard both regular, fixed-route BC Transit buses and handyDART buses for free; below the age of 6, they must be accompanied by someone 12 years or older.

=== Routes ===
| No. | Route | Notes | Service days |
|---|---|---|---|
Local routes
| 1 | Coldstream / Downtown | | Mon-Sun |
| 2 | Pleasant Valley | | Mon-Sun |
| 3 | North End via Alexis Park / Downtown | | Mon-Sun |
| 4 | East Hill | | Mon-Sun |
| 5 | South Vernon | | Mon-Sun |
| 6 | College / Downtown via Hospital | Connects to Okanagan College. | Mon-Sun |
| 7 | Okanagan Landing | | Mon-Sun |
| 8 | Bella Vista | | Mon-Sun |
| 9 | North End / Downtown | Service every 15 minutes at peak times | Mon-Sun |
Regional routes
| 41 | Salmon Arm - Enderby | Operated by Shuswap Regional Transit. Previously Route 11, renumbered 1 April 2022. | Wednesday only |
| 60 | Enderby / Armstrong / Vernon | Saturday: Armstrong only | Mon-Sat |
| 61 | Vernon / Lumby | Connects Lumby with downtown Vernon | Mon-Fri |
| 90 | UBCO Connector / Vernon | Connects Vernon to the UBC Okanagan campus in Kelowna. | Mon-Sun |
Source: BC Transit
