= Bear Lake, British Columbia =

Bear Lake
- Unincorporated community / designated place
- Location of Bear Lake in British Columbia
- Coordinates: 54°29′41″N 122°41′2″W
- Country: Canada
- Province: British Columbia
- Regional district: Fraser–Fort George
- Electoral area: G (Crooked River/Parsnip)

Area
  - Land: 1.51 km^{2} (0.58 sq mi)

Population (2021)
  - Total: 152
  - Density: 100.8/km^{2} (261/sq mi)
- Time zone: UTC−07:00 (PT)
- Postal code: V0J 3G0
- Area codes: 250 / 778 / 236
- Highways: Highway 97

Bear Lake is an unincorporated settlement in northern British Columbia, Canada, approximately 70 kilometres (43 mi) north of Prince George along Highway 97. Bear Lake is a designated place by Statistics Canada and BC Stats, located in the Regional District of Fraser–Fort George.

It is home to the Crooked River Provincial Park.

== Demographics ==
Canada census – Bear Lake, British Columbia community profile

	2021	2016
Population	152 (+0.7% from 2016)	151 (-5.0% from 2011)
Land area	1.51 km^{2} (0.58 sq mi)	1.54 km^{2} (0.59 sq mi)
Population density	100.8/km^{2} (261/sq mi)	98.0/km^{2} (254/sq mi)
Median age	57.2 (M: 57.6, F: 56.8)	56.8 (M: 58.0, F: 53.8)
Private dwellings	93 (total) 83 (occupied)	93 (total) 74 (occupied)
Median household income	$n/a	$61,952

References: 2021 2016

Historical census populations – Bear Lake (Designated place)
Year	Pop.	±%
2006	170	—
2011	159	−6.5%
2016	151	−5.0%
2021	152	+0.7%
Source: Statistics Canada

== Government ==
The community is in the provincial electoral district of Prince George-Mackenzie, and the MLA is Mike Morris. Federally, it falls in the Prince George-Peace River electoral district, the seat was filled by Bob Zimmer in the 2011 Federal Election.

== Education ==
Bear Lake Elementary School, administered by School District 57 Prince George, was closed in approximately 2005. Students, both elementary and secondary, are bused to schools in Salmon Valley and Prince George, approximately 45 km and 60 km away respectively.
