= British Columbia Highway 97 =

Provincial highway in British Columbia, Canada

Highway 97
- Highway 97 highlighted in red.

Route information
- Maintained by the Ministry of Transportation and Infrastructure
- Length: 2,189.47 km (1,360.47 mi)
- Existed: 1953–present
- Component highways: Okanagan Highway between Osoyoos and Vernon; Vernon-Monte Creek Highway between Vernon and Monte Creek; Cariboo Highway between Cache Creek and Prince George; John Hart Highway between Prince George and Dawson Creek; Alaska Highway between Dawson Creek and Watson Lake, Yukon

Major junctions
- South end: US 97 at the U.S. border near Osoyoos
- Highway 3 in Osoyoos; Highway 97C in Peachland; Highway 33 in Kelowna; Highway 6 / Highway 97A in Vernon; Highway 1 (TCH) from Monte Creek to Cache Creek; Highway 5 (YH) in Kamloops; Highway 99 near Cache Creek; Highway 20 in Williams Lake; Highway 16 (TCH) in Prince George; Highway 2 in Dawson Creek; Highway 77 near Fort Nelson
- North end: Hwy 1 at the Yukon border near Watson Lake

Location
- Country: Canada
- Province: British Columbia
- Regional districts: Okanagan-Similkameen, Central Okanagan, North Okanagan, Thompson-Nicola, Cariboo, Fraser-Fort George, Peace River, Northern Rockies, Stikine
- Major cities: Penticton, West Kelowna, Kelowna, Vernon, Kamloops, Williams Lake, Quesnel, Prince George, Dawson Creek, Fort St. John

Highway system
- British Columbia provincial highways
← Highway 95A	→ Highway 97A

Highway 97 is a major highway in the Canadian province of British Columbia. It is the longest continuously numbered route in the province and the longest provincial highway in Canada, running 2,081 kilometres (1,293 miles) and is the only route that runs the entire north–south length of British Columbia, stretching from the Canada–United States border near Osoyoos in the south to the British Columbia–Yukon boundary in the north at Watson Lake, Yukon.

The highway connects several major cities in BC Interior, including Kelowna, Kamloops, Prince George, and Dawson Creek. Within and near these cities, Highway 97 varies from a two-lane highway to a freeway with as many as six lanes. Some remote sections also remain unpaved and gravelled. The route takes its number from U.S. Route 97, with which it connects at the international border. The highway was initially designated '97' in 1953.

== Route description ==
The busiest section of Highway 97 is in West Kelowna, carrying almost 70,000 vehicles per day. Some sections in the northern regions of the province have as few as 250 vehicles per day.

=== Okanagan Highway ===
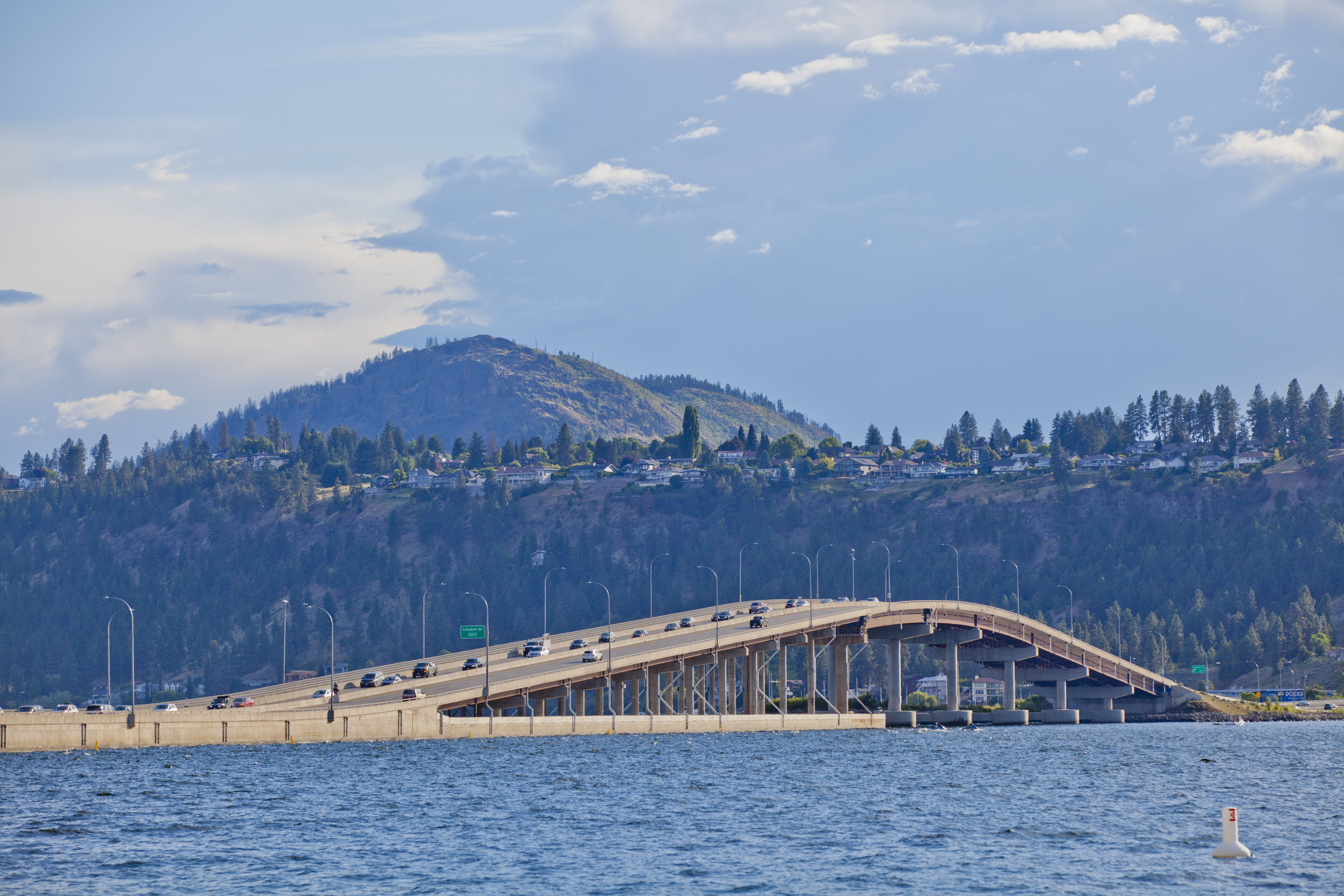
Crossing Okanagan Lake via the William R. Bennett Bridge in Kelowna.

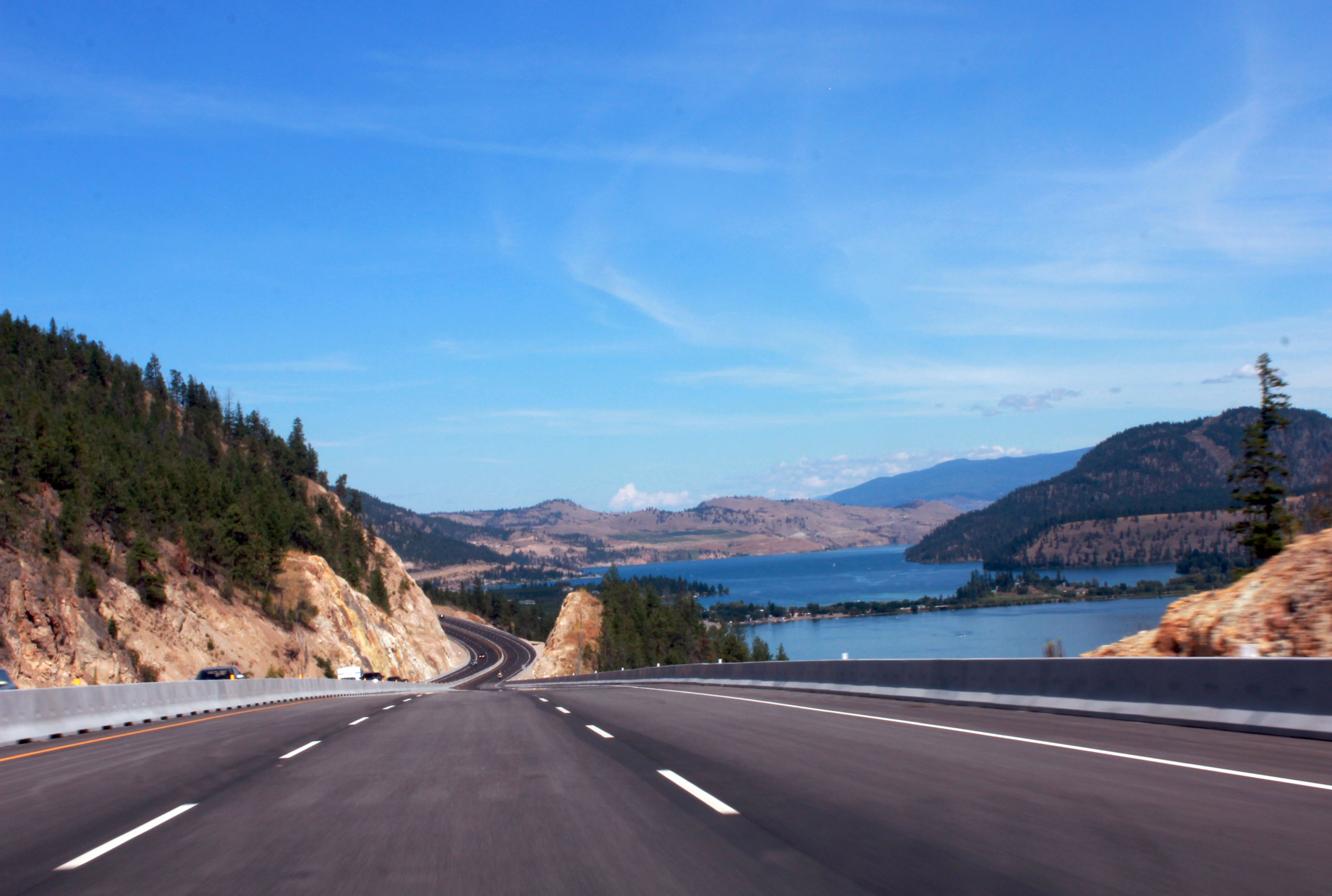
Okanagan Highway passing through Lake Country, between Kelowna and Vernon.

The 189-kilometre (117 mi) section of Highway 97 between the Canada–United States border and the junction of Highway 97A north of Vernon is known as the "Okanagan Highway". It is named for the Okanagan region of British Columbia, through which it largely passes. It begins in the south at the international border crossing north of Oroville, Washington, and travels 4 km (2.5 mi) north to its junction with the Crowsnest Highway (Highway 3) at Osoyoos. The highway travels north for 47 km (29 mi), passing through the Testalinden Creek Landslide and the communities of Oliver and Okanagan Falls. From Okanagan Falls, Highway 97 runs near the western shore of Skaha Lake before arriving at the locality of Kaleden, where Highway 3A diverges west.

13 km (8 mi) north of Kaleden, Highway 97 arrives at the city of Penticton. North of Penticton, Highway 97 follows the western shore of Okanagan Lake for 45 km (28 mi), through the communities of Summerland and Peachland, before reaching its junction with Highway 97C just south of Westbank. From there, Highway 97 passes through West Kelowna and reserve lands belonging to the Westbank First Nation until, 15 km (9 mi) northeast of the 97C junction, Highway 97 begins to cross Okanagan Lake via the William R. Bennett Bridge. The highway enters the city of Kelowna upon landfall on the east shore of the lake. 6 km (4 mi) east into the city centre, the highway reaches its junction with Highway 33. As the Okanagan is a very popular travel destination and also has the highest population in inland B.C. (about 300,000), this section of highway 97 is by far the busiest. Congestion is frequent - particularly near the William Bennett Bridge, and Southbound towards West Kelowna.

Four kilometres (2 1/2 miles) north of the Highway 33 junction, Highway 97 leaves the urbanized area of Kelowna (the municipal boundary is actually a further 12 kilometres, 7 miles, north). For the next 43 km (27 mi), the route travels well east of Okanagan Lake, passing through the community of Winfield. Prior to 2013, the highway ran alongside the west shore of Wood Lake to Oyama. A new 9-kilometre (5.6 mi) section of four-lane highway was constructed and opened to traffic at that time, which bypasses Oyama entirely to the north. The original section of the highway skirting the western shore of Wood Lake is now known as "Pelmewash Parkway". Both Oyama and Winfield lie within the municipality of Lake Country.

Highway 97 then passes along the west shore of Kalamalka Lake before entering the city of Vernon and a junction with Highway 6 just south of the city centre. The highway then travels north for 10 km (6 mi) to a junction with Highway 97A near Swan Lake.

=== Vernon-Kamloops-Cache Creek ===
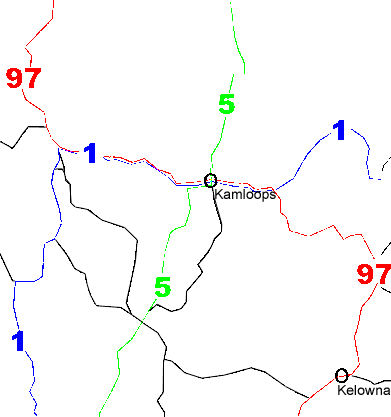
This diagram illustrates the wrong-way concurrency between Highways 5 and 97 through Kamloops.

Highway 97 continues northwest from Highway 97A for 81 km (50 mi), past the town of Falkland, before it merges onto the Trans-Canada Highway at Monte Creek, and is known as the "Vernon-Monte Creek Highway". The highway follows Highway 1 for 105 km (65 mi) west to Cache Creek. As it travels westward, Highways 1 and 97 parallel the Thompson River, passing through the city of Kamloops, where the route shares a 12-kilometre (7.5 mi) wrong-way concurrency with Highway 5 (signed as 97 north and 5 south and vice versa) and intersects Highway 5A.

=== Cariboo Highway ===
The "Cariboo Highway" section of Highway 97, between Cache Creek and Prince George, is 441 km (274 mi) in length and named for the Cariboo region, through which it travels. Much of its length as far as Quesnel follows approximately the route of the original Cariboo Wagon Road, which was also known as the Queen's Highway. The Cariboo Wagon Road's lower stretches between Yale and Cache Creek were severed in many places by the construction of the Canadian Pacific Railway in the 1880s. That section, now part of the Trans-Canada Highway, was rebuilt in the 1920s, when the name "Cariboo Highway" was first applied to the route, a designation which ran from Yale to Prince George, British Columbia (where portions of the route survive as the Old Cariboo Highway). Today, the "Cariboo Highway" designation begins at Cache Creek, veering north for 11 km (7 mi) to its junction with Highway 99. North of Highway 99, Highway 97 travels 92 km (57 mi) through Clinton, where the British Columbia Railway begins to roughly parallel Highway 97, as well as through the community of 70 Mile House before reaching a junction at 93 Mile House with Highway 24 (the Interlakes Highway). The roughly 30-kilometre (19 mi) section of highway between 70 Mile House and Highway 24 has been re-routed to a new expressway with a speed limit of 110 km/h.

Over the 100 km (62 mi) of road north of Highway 24, Highway 97 travels through 100 Mile House and 150 Mile House before reaching the city of Williams Lake and a junction with Highway 20, which runs west across the Chilcotin District to Bella Coola on the Central Coast. Over the next 120 km (75 mi) continuing generally northward, the highway passes through McLeese Lake and Marguerite. En route, Highway 97 follows the east bank of the Fraser River to the city of Quesnel, and a junction with Highway 26. Over the next 115 km (71 mi) north of Quesnel, after passing through the hamlets of Strathnaver, Hixon, Stoner and Red Rock, Highway 97 meets its junction with Highway 16 at Prince George. North of here, the highway veers away from the Fraser River, and the British Columbia Railway veers northwestward from it.

The term "Cariboo Highway" originally applied to the reconstructed route from Hope through the Fraser Canyon to Cache Creek and Prince George. Constructed in 1924–25, the new gravel toll highway opened in 1926, giving road access to canyon communities cut off since the destruction of parts of the Cariboo Road by construction of the Canadian Pacific Railway in the 1880s. The "Cariboo Highway" designation for the Fraser Canyon portion of the route was supplanted with the completion and naming of the Trans-Canada Highway c. 1962. Portions of the old highway survive as local streets, some carrying the name "Old Cariboo Highway" (as in Prince George).

=== John Hart Highway ===
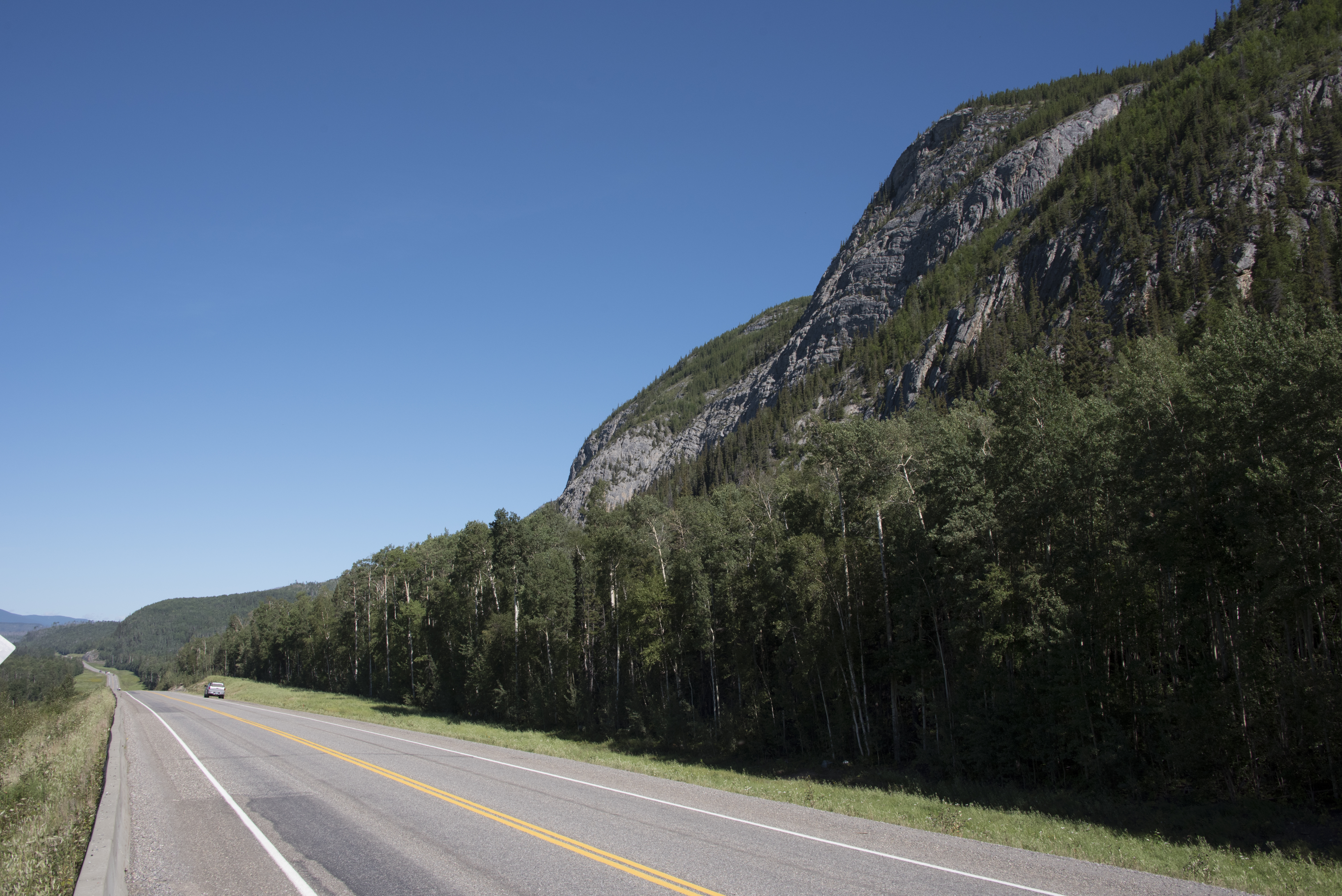
On B.C. Highway 97 (Alaska Highway) near Stone Mountain Provincial Park before Toad River

This 405-kilometre-long (252 mi) stretch of Highway 97 between Prince George and Dawson Creek is the "John Hart Highway", in honour of former British Columbia Premier John Hart. It begins at the John Hart Bridge crossing the Nechako River in Prince George, travelling for 152 km (94 mi) north through the small hamlet of Summit Lake, which is situated at the Continental Divide, as well as through Crooked River Provincial Park, Bear Lake and McLeod Lake, to its intersection with Highway 39. It then journeys northeast another 150 km (93 mi) over the crest of the Rocky Mountains via the Pine Pass. After descending from the Pine Pass, the highway generally follows the Pine River northeast to its intersection with Highway 29 at the town of Chetwynd. After a trek of another 97 km (60 mi) east, the Hart Highway terminates at Dawson Creek.

=== Alaska Highway ===
This northernmost section of Highway 97 is 965 km (600 mi) long, and travels north through largely unpopulated wilderness, intersecting the communities of Fort St. John and Fort Nelson, the latter being just east of the junction of Highway 77, travelling north to the Northwest Territories. Here, the highway veers generally northwestward into wilderness spotted with tiny localities. As it passes over the Rocky Mountains, the highway parallels the Liard River before terminating at the BC–Yukon boundary near Watson Lake, where the Alaska Highway is numbered as Yukon Highway 1.

== Major intersections ==
Regional District	Location	km	mi	Exit	Destinations	Notes
Okanagan-Similkameen		0.00	0.00		US 97 south – Oroville, Wenatchee	49th parallel; continues into Washington; Okanagan Highway south end
Okanagan-Similkameen		0.00	0.00	Canada–United States border at Oroville-Osoyoos Border Crossing		
Okanagan-Similkameen	Osoyoos	4.50	2.80		Highway 3 (Crowsnest Highway) – Grand Forks, Castlegar, Hope, Vancouver	Former south end of Highway 3A concurrency.
Okanagan-Similkameen	Oliver	24.53	15.24		Fairview Road – Mount Baldy Ski Area	
Okanagan-Similkameen	Okanagan Falls	45.60	28.33		Main Street / 9th Avenue	To Highway 905:1280 north
Okanagan-Similkameen	Kaleden	51.67	32.11		Highway 3A west – Keremeos, Vancouver	Former north end of Highway 3A concurrency.
Okanagan-Similkameen	Penticton	60.41	37.54		Skaha Lake Road – City Centre	
Okanagan-Similkameen	Penticton	63.35	39.36		Fairview Road / Green Mountain Road – Apex Mountain Resort	
Okanagan-Similkameen	Penticton	65.19	40.51		Eckhardt Avenue – City Centre, Naramata	
Okanagan-Similkameen	Summerland	80.98	50.32		Rosedale Avenue – Town Centre	
Central Okanagan	Peachland	101.81	63.26		Princeton Avenue / Beach Avenue – Town Centre	
Central Okanagan	Peachland	103.91	64.57		Ponderossa Drive / 13th Street – Town Centre	
Central Okanagan	Peachland	109.01	67.74	—	Highway 97C west (Okanagan Connector) – Merritt, Kamloops, Vancouver	Drought Hill interchange
Central Okanagan	West Kelowna	111.14	69.06	—	Glenrosa Road	Glenrosa Road interchange
Central Okanagan	West Kelowna	112.48– 113.83	69.89– 70.73	One-way pair through Westbank		
Central Okanagan	West Kelowna	119.81	74.45	—	Hudson Road / Westside Road (Highway 905:1292 north)	Westside Road interchange
Central Okanagan	West Kelowna	124.33	77.26	—	Campbell Road	Campbell Road interchange
Okanagan Lake		124.74– 125.81	77.51– 78.17	William R. Bennett Bridge		
Central Okanagan	Kelowna	126.56	78.64	South end of HOV lanes		
Central Okanagan	Kelowna	126.56	78.64		Pandosy Street / Water Street	
Central Okanagan	Kelowna	132.36	82.24		Highway 33 south – Big White Ski Resort, Rock Creek	
Central Okanagan	Kelowna	137.09	85.18		Edwards Road	
Central Okanagan	Kelowna	137.09	85.18	North end of HOV lanes		
Central Okanagan	Kelowna	138.19	85.87	—	John Hindle Drive – UBC Okanagan	Northbound exit and southbound entrance
Central Okanagan	Kelowna	139.08	86.42		University Way – UBC Okanagan	At grade; no northbound exit
Central Okanagan	Kelowna	140.31	87.18		Airport Way – Kelowna International Airport	
Central Okanagan	Lake Country	148.29	92.14		Beaver Lake Road / Glenmore Road	Winfield
Central Okanagan	Lake Country	152.67	94.86	—	Pelmewash Parkway (Highway 905:1290 north)	Wood Lake Interchange; northbound exit and southbound entrance
Central Okanagan	Lake Country	160.51	99.74	—	Pelmewash Parkway (Highway 905:1290 south) / Gatzke Road	Gatzke Road interchange
North Okanagan	Vernon	179.34	111.44		25th Avenue (Highway 6 east) – Lumby, Nelson	
North Okanagan	Vernon	181.44	112.74		48th Avenue – Silver Star Mountain Resort	
North Okanagan	Vernon	183.02	113.72	—	27th Street	Southbound exit and northbound entrance
North Okanagan	Spallumcheen	188.97	117.42	—	Highway 97A north – Salmon Arm, Sicamous	Swan Lake interchange; Okanagan Highway north end; Vernon-Monte Creek Highway south end
North Okanagan	Okanagan 1	194.60	120.92		Westside Road (Highway 905:1292 south) – Westshore, Killiney, Fintry	
Columbia-Shuswap		207.65	129.03		Salmon River Road (Highway 905:1127 north) – Armstrong, Spallumcheen, Enderby, Salmon Arm	
Columbia-Shuswap	Falkland	242.78	150.86		Chase-Falkland Road (Highway 905:1294 north)	
Thompson-Nicola	Monte Creek	269.71	167.59	399	Highway 1 (TCH) east – Salmon Arm	Monte Creek interchange; Vernon-Monte Creek Highway north end; south end of Highway 1 concurrency; exit numbers follow Highway 1
Thompson-Nicola		271.74	168.85	396 (Note: Eastbound exit number); 397 (Note: Westbound exit number)	Hook Road	Hook Road interchange
Thompson-Nicola	Kamloops	278.29	172.92	390; 391	Lafarge Road	Tumbleweed interchange
Thompson-Nicola	Kamloops	281.98	175.21	386; 388	Kokanee Way	Kokanee Way interchange
Thompson-Nicola	Kamloops	286.85	178.24	384	Kipp Road / Dallas Drive / Barnhartvale Road	Nina Place/Kipp Road interchange
Thompson-Nicola	Kamloops	Gap in freeway; 6 signalized intersections				
Thompson-Nicola	Kamloops	295.26	183.47	375	Battle Street – City Centre	Valleyview interchange; no eastbound exit
Thompson-Nicola	Kamloops	295.71	183.75	374	Highway 5 (YH) north – Sun Peaks, Jasper	Yellowhead interchange; south end of Highway 5 wrong-way concurrency
Thompson-Nicola	Kamloops	299.20	185.91	370	Summit Drive – City Centre	Springhill interchange; westbound exit and eastbound entrance
Thompson-Nicola	Kamloops	300.13	186.49	369	Columbia Street – City Centre	Sagebrush interchange; eastbound exit and westbound entrance
Thompson-Nicola	Kamloops	301.08	187.08	368	Highway 5A south / Hillside Way	Aberdeen interchange
Thompson-Nicola	Kamloops	301.87	187.57	367	Pacific Way	Pacific Way interchange
Thompson-Nicola	Kamloops	303.55	188.62	366	Copperhead Drive / Lac le Jeune Road	Copperhead interchange; to Highway 906:0923 south
Thompson-Nicola	Kamloops	307.78	191.25	362	Highway 5 (YH) south (Coquihalla Highway) – Merritt, Kelowna, Hope, Vancouver	Afton interchange; north end of Highway 5 wrong-way concurrency; Highway 1 / Highway 97 exits freeway
Thompson-Nicola	Savona	343.74	213.59	Savona Bridge (Kamloops Lake Bridge) crosses Thompson River		
Thompson-Nicola	Cache Creek	379.77	235.98		Highway 1 (TCH) west / Highway 97C south – Vancouver	North end of Highway 1 concurrency; Cariboo Highway south end
Thompson-Nicola		390.79	242.83		Highway 99 south – Lillooet, Pemberton, Whistler	
Cariboo	93 Mile House	483.10	300.18		Highway 24 east – Lone Butte, Bridge Lake, Little Fort	
Cariboo	100 Mile House	491.57	305.45		Horse Lake Road (Highway 907:1153 east)	
Cariboo	100 Mile House	494.80	307.45		Canim Hendrix Lake Road (Highway 907:1152 north) – Forest Grove, Canim Lake, Hendrix Lake	
Cariboo	150 Mile House	568.44	353.21		Likely Road (Highway 907:1552 north) – Horsefly, Likely	
Cariboo	Williams Lake	582.63	362.03		Highway 20 west / Oliver Street – City Centre, Alexis Creek, Bella Coola	
Cariboo	Quesnel	699.43	434.61	—	Northstar Road	Northstar Road interchange
Cariboo	Quesnel	700.22	435.10	Quesnel River Bridge crosses Quesnel River		
Cariboo	Quesnel	701.25	435.74		Moffat Bridge Approach – West Quesnel	To Highway 907:1556 / Highway 907:1557
Cariboo	Quesnel	706.93	439.27		Highway 26 east – Wells, Barkerville	
Fraser-Fort George		809.32	502.89		Old Cariboo Highway (Highway 909:1156 north) to Highway 16 (TCH/YH) – McBride, Jasper	Former Highway 97A north
Fraser-Fort George	Prince George	813.95	505.77		Sintich Road – Prince George Airport	
Fraser-Fort George	Prince George	700.22	435.10	Simon Fraser Bridge crosses Fraser River		
Fraser-Fort George	Prince George	819.72	509.35	—	Queensway / Ferry Avenue	Interchange
Fraser-Fort George	Prince George	821.04	510.17		Highway 16 (TCH/YH) – Terrace, Prince Rupert, Jasper, Edmonton	
Fraser-Fort George	Prince George	821.74	510.61	—	Massey Drive / Pine Centre Road	Massey Drive interchange
Fraser-Fort George	Prince George	823.00	511.39		15th Avenue	
Fraser-Fort George	Prince George	824.14	512.10		5th Avenue	
Fraser-Fort George	Prince George	824.77	512.49	John Hart Bridge crosses Nechako River; Cariboo Highway north end; John Hart Highway south end		
Fraser-Fort George	Prince George	825.32	512.83	—	North Nechako Road	North Nechako Road interchange; former Highway 97A south
Fraser-Fort George		977.42	607.34		Highway 39 north – Mackenzie	
Fraser-Fort George–Peace River district line		1,015.72	631.14	Pine Pass – el. 933 m (3,061 ft)		
Peace River	Chetwynd	1,125.54	699.38		Highway 29 north – Hudson's Hope, Fort St. John	South end of Highway 29 concurrency
Peace River		1,128.46	701.19		Highway 29 south – Tumbler Ridge	North end of Highway 29 concurrency
Peace River		1,205.75	749.22		Highway 52 south – Tumbler Ridge	
Peace River	Dawson Creek	1,225.37	761.41		Highway 2 east – City Centre, Grande Prairie, Edmonton	John Hart Highway north end; Alaska Highway south end; to Highway 49
Peace River		1,257.17	781.17	Kiskatinaw Bridge crosses Kiskatinaw River		
Peace River	Taylor	1,278.47– 1,279.20	794.40– 794.86	Taylor Bridge crosses Peace River		
Peace River	Fort St. John	1,297.04	805.94		100th Street	To Highway 908:1173 north
Peace River		1,309.56	813.72		Highway 29 south – Hudson's Hope, Chetwynd	
Northern Rockies	Fort Nelson	1,676.71– 1,678.85	1,041.86– 1,043.19	Passes through Fort Nelson		
Northern Rockies		1,706.52	1,060.38		Highway 77 north (Liard Highway) – Fort Liard, Fort Simpson	
Northern Rockies		1,819.57	1,130.63	Summit Pass – 1,267 m (4,157 ft)		
Northern Rockies		1,985.48	1,233.72	Liard River Bridge crosses Liard River		
Northern Rockies		2,045.67	1,271.12	Coal River Bridge crosses Coal River		
Unorganized		2,128.1– 2,129.3	1,322.3– 1,323.1	1.2 km (0.7 mi) section in Yukon (Remains as BC 97)		
Unorganized		2,132.0– 2,140.4	1,324.8– 1,330.0	8.4 km (5.2 mi) section in Yukon (Remains as BC 97)		
Unorganized		2,142.2– 2,144.6	1,331.1– 1,332.6	2.4 km (1.5 mi) section in Yukon (Remains as BC 97)		
Unorganized (Stikine Region)		2,159.23	1,341.68	Hyland River Bridge crosses Hyland River		
Unorganized (Stikine Region)		2,189.47	1,360.47		Hwy 1 (Alaska Highway) – Watson Lake, Whitehorse	60th parallel; continues into Yukon
1.000 mi = 1.609 km; 1.000 km = 0.621 mi: Concurrency terminus; HOV only; Incomplete access; Route transition
