= McLeod Lake =

- Location of McLeod Lake in British Columbia
- Coordinates: 54°59′05″N 123°02′43″W
- Country: Canada
- Province: British Columbia
- Regional District: Fraser-Fort George
- Established: 1805

Government
  - MP: Bob Zimmer
  - MLAs: Mike Morris

Area
  - Land: 10.23 km^{2} (3.95 sq mi)
- Elevation: 756 m (2,480 ft)

Population (2016)
  - Total: 94
  - Density: 8.5/km^{2} (22/sq mi)
- Time zone: UTC−07:00 (PT)
- Postal code span: V0J 2G0
- Area code: 250 / 778 / 236
- Highways: Highway 97

McLeod Lake is an unincorporated community located on Highway 97 in northern British Columbia, Canada, 140 km (87 mi) north of Prince George. It is notable for being the first continuously inhabited European settlement established west of the Rocky Mountains in present-day Canada.

== History ==
Originally named Trout Lake Fort, it was founded by the explorer and North West Company trader Simon Fraser in 1805 and was for a while known as La Malice Fort, after an employee left in charge during Fraser's absence. It became known soon after as Fort McLeod during the tenure of Archibald Norman McLeod, who was in charge of the post for many years. The site of the fort was designated a National Historic Site of Canada in 1953.

McLeod Lake Indian Reserve No. 1, which is adjacent to the non-native community, has a population of around 87, the main residents being an Athabascan Sekani people known as "Tse'Khene" (the people of the rock, in reference to the Rocky Mountains). Having signed Treaty 8 in the year 2000, the natives of the community are trying to direct themselves towards self-government and employment stability.

The lake itself is 2,290 ha (5,700 acres).

A point in the marshes on its southern shore of nearby Summit Lake marks the low point of the divide between the drainages of the Fraser and Peace Rivers, As such it is significant as the prominence col between all points south in the Rockies and beyond and their "parent" summits in northern BC and Alaska. Summit Lake col, at 710 m (2,330 ft) in elevation, is the low point on the mountain spine of the Americas that connects Pico de Orizaba (5,640 m (18,500 ft)) in Mexico with its next-higher "parent" peak, Mount Logan (5,959 m (19,551 ft)).

== See also ==
- List of rivers of British Columbia
- Mackenzie, British Columbia

== Bibliography ==
- BCGNIS listing "Fort McLeod (fort)" - Rescinded
- BC Geographical Names listing "McLeod Lake (Community)"
- BC Geographical Names listing "Fort McLeod Historic Park"
