= 100 Mile House =

- District municipality
- District of 100 Mile House
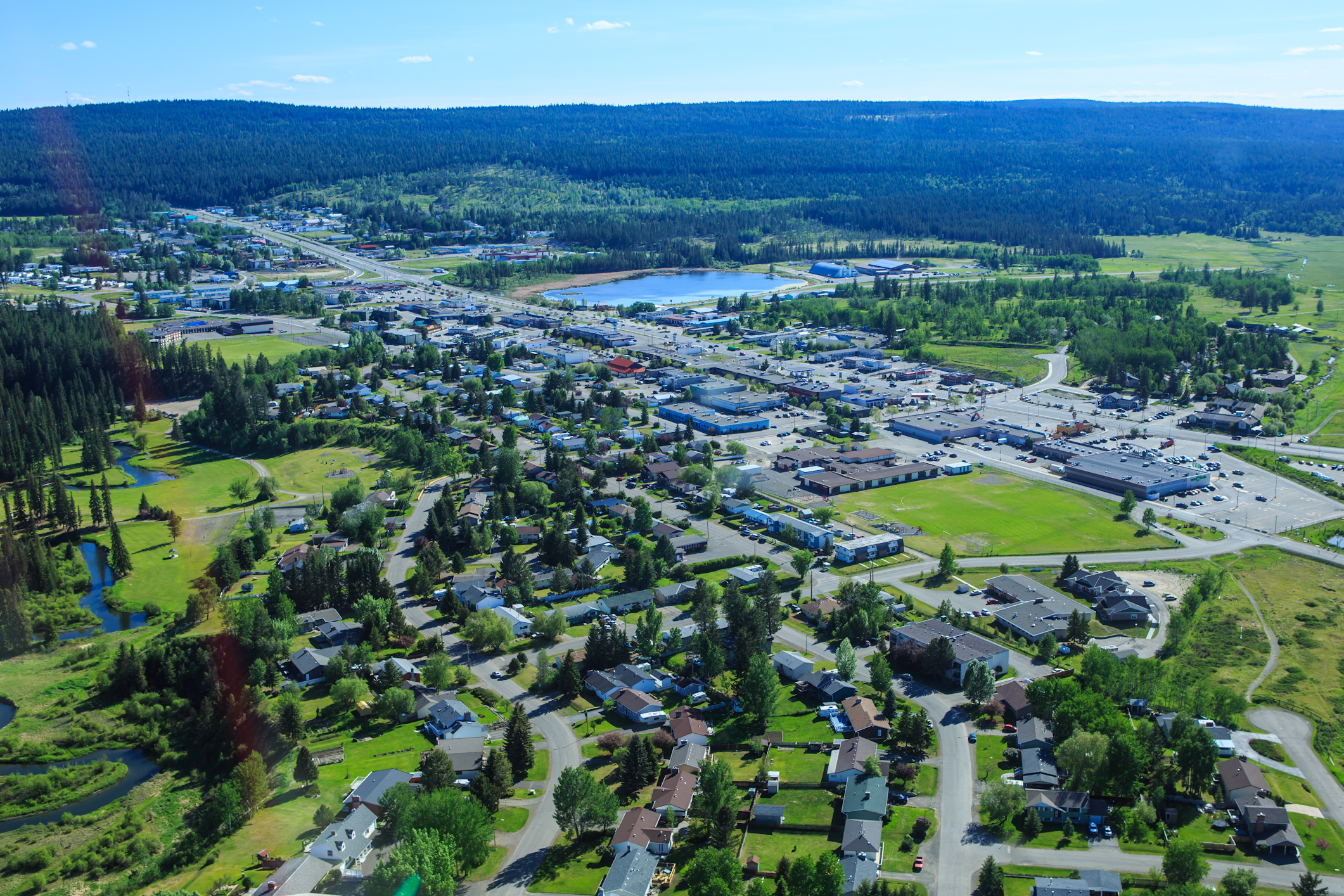
- View of 100 Mile House
- Motto: Centum Salutationes
- Location of 100 Mile House in British Columbia 100 Mile House (Canada)
- Coordinates: 51°38′33″N 121°17′51″W
- Country: Canada
- Province: British Columbia
- Regional district: Cariboo
- Founded: 1862
- Incorporated: 1965

Government
  - Mayor: Maureen Pinkney
  - MP: Frank Caputo (Conservative)
  - MLA: Lorne Doerkson (Conservative)

Area (2021)
  - Total: 53.01 km^{2} (20.47 sq mi)
- Elevation at the weather station: 1,059.2 m (3,475 ft)

Population (2021)
  - Total: 1,928
  - Density: 36.4/km^{2} (94/sq mi)
- Time zone: UTC−07:00 (PT)
- Area code: 250 / 778 / 236
- Highways: Highway 97
- Waterways: Bridge Creek
- Website: www.100milehouse.com

100 Mile House is a district municipality located in the South Cariboo region of central British Columbia, Canada.

== History ==
100 Mile House was originally known as Bridge Creek House, named after the creek running through the area. Its origins as a settlement go back to the time when Thomas Miller owned a collection of ramshackle buildings serving the traffic of the gold rush as a resting point for travellers moving between Kamloops and Fort Alexandria, which was 158 km (98 mi) north of 100 Mile House farther along the Hudson's Bay Brigade Trail. It acquired its current name during the Cariboo Gold Rush where a roadhouse was constructed in 1862 at the 100 miles (160 km) mark up the Old Cariboo Road from Lillooet.

In 1930, Lord Martin Cecil left England to come to 100 Mile House and manage the estate owned by his father, the 5th Marquess of Exeter. The estate's train stop on the Pacific Great Eastern (now BC Rail leased and operated by Canadian National) railway is to the west of town and called Exeter. The town, which at the time consisted of the roadhouse, a general store, a post office, telegraph office, and a power plant, had a population of 12. The original roadhouse burned down in 1937.

100 Mile House is on Secwépemc unceded territory. The nearest Secwépemc band is the Tsq'escen for which a geographic reference point is the Canim Lake Reserve.

== Demographics ==
In the 2021 Canadian census conducted by Statistics Canada, 100 Mile House had a population of 1,928 living in 907 of its 974 total private dwellings, a change of 0.5% from its 2016 population of 1,918. With a land area of 53.01 km^{2} (20.47 sq mi), it had a population density of 36.4/km^{2} (94.2/sq mi) in 2021.

=== Religion ===
According to the 2021 census, religious groups in 100 Mile House included:

- Irreligion (1,035 persons or 58.0 percent)
- Christianity (630 persons or 35.3 percent)
- Sikhism (95 persons or 5.3 percent)

== Economy ==
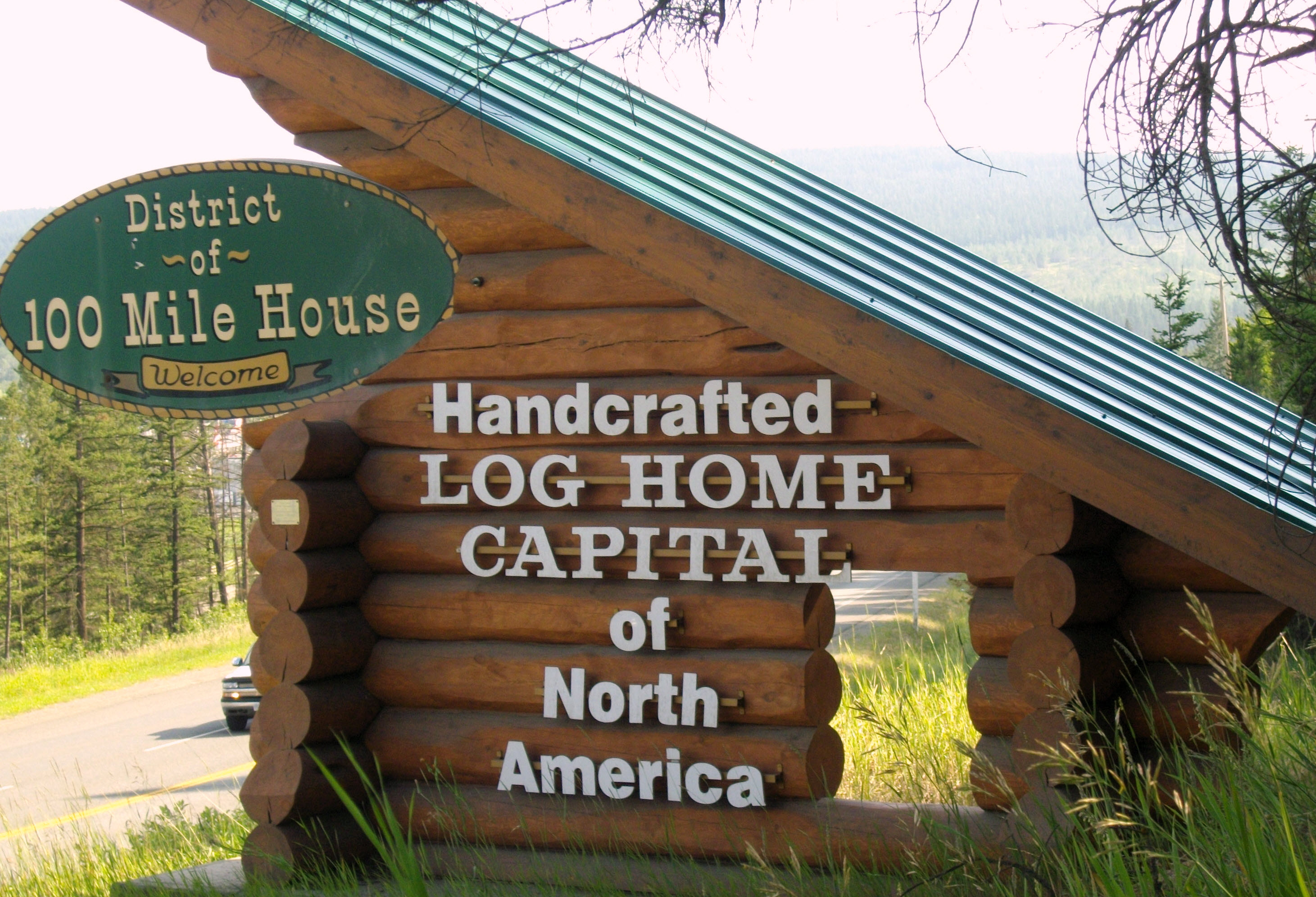
100 Mile House's welcome sign

At present, 100 Mile House is the primary service centre for the South Cariboo and has a population of approximately 2,000. The service area has a population roughly ten times the size of the town. It includes the communities of Lac la Hache, Forest Grove, Lone Butte, Horse Lake, Bridge Lake, 70 Mile House, Canim Lake, and 108 Mile Ranch, and is the largest residential centre between Kamloops and Williams Lake.

The primary industries of 100 Mile House are forestry and ranching. Log home building and tourism are also an important part of the community.

In December 2025, West Fraser Timber Co. announced that it was closing the last sawmill in 100 Mile House, citing the lack of economically accessible timber.

=== Tourism ===
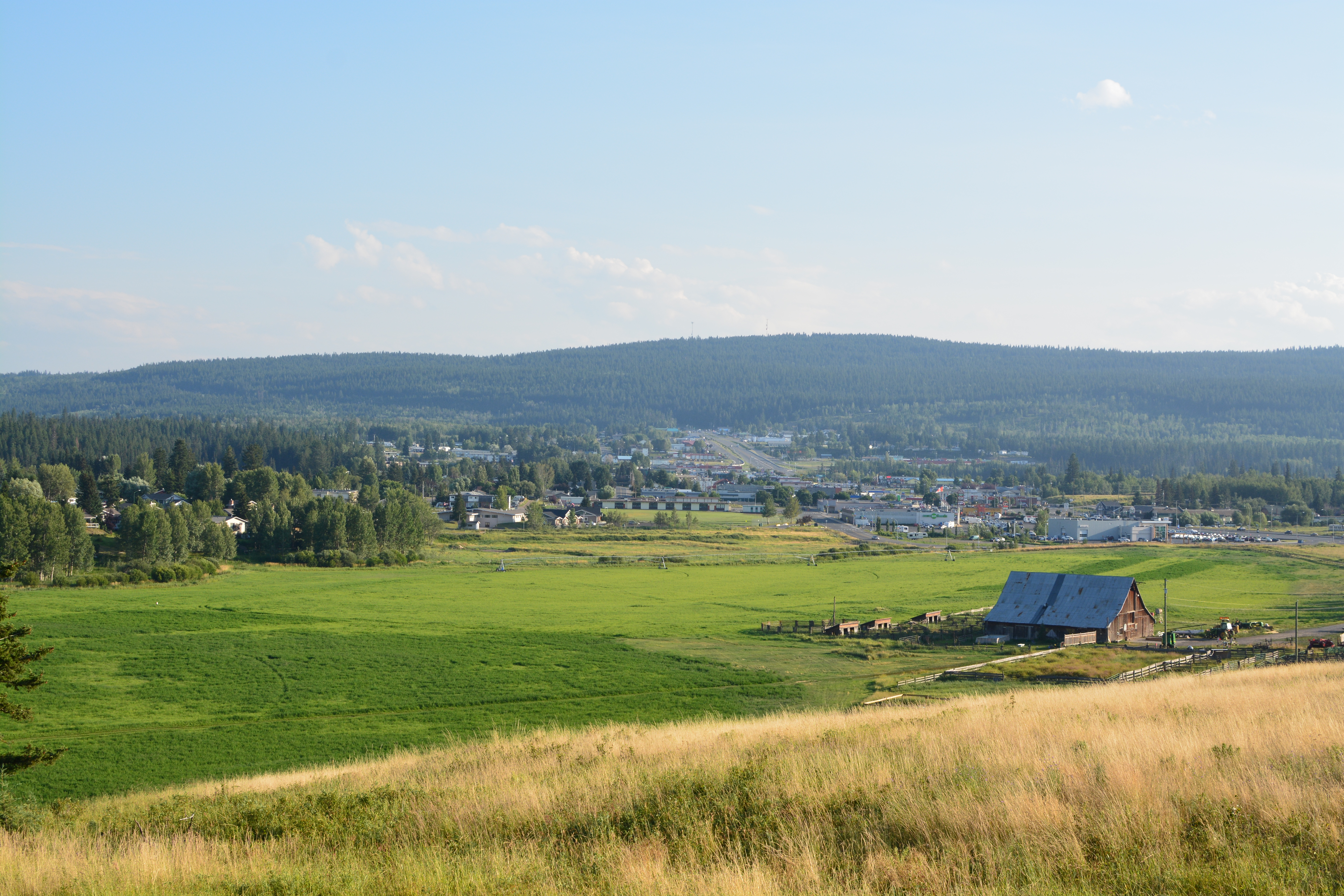
A view of the north end of 100 Mile House, taken from the Cariboo Highway

100 Mile House is a centre for outdoor activities and is becoming increasingly known for its richness of bird life. The surrounding area features hundreds of lakes for boating and fishing including 101 Mile Lake, 103 Mile Lake, Lac La Hache, Canim Lake, Horse Lake, Green Lake, Bridge Lake and Sheridan Lake. The Cariboo ski marathon attracts a large and international field of cross-country (Nordic) skiers.

The surrounding communities have various activities for residents and visiting tourists, including rodeos and an extensive trail system. This area is known for outdoor activities including hiking, snowmobiling, cross country skiing, and ATV riding. There are government campgrounds at Green Lake, Bridge Lake and Lac La Hache. There are also many private campsites around the area that also offer cabin and fishing boat rentals and RV hook-ups.

=== Transportation ===
100 Mile House was located historically along the Cariboo Road. Until 2002, it was served by BC Rail's daily dayliner service between Vancouver and Prince George. Until 2013, 100 Mile House was served by Greyhound Canada. Today, the town is served by the 100 Mile House Regional Transit System and by Adventure Charters intercity bus service four times a week in each direction. The area is also served by BC Transit Health Connections. The town is home to the 100 Mile House Airport with no scheduled services and is located near the larger South Cariboo Regional Airport.

== Nearby locations ==
- North of 100 Mile House are 108 Mile Ranch, Lac la Hache (26 km [16 mi]), 150 Mile House (77 km [48 mi]), Williams Lake (91 km [57 mi]), and McLeese Lake (135 km [84 mi]).
- Also located north of 100 Mile House are Quesnel (210 km [130 mi]) and Prince George (329 km [204 mi]).
- Southeast of 100 Mile House are the Interlakes area and Bridge Lake (56 km [35 mi]).
- South of the town are 70 Mile House (40 km [25 mi]), Clinton (72 km [45 mi]), Cache Creek (112 km [70 mi]), Spences Bridge (159 km [99 mi]), and Vancouver (456 km [283 mi]).

== Climate ==
100 Mile House has a humid continental climate (Köppen Dfb) with mild summers combined with cool nights, along with cold, but not very cold winters for its latitude. In spite of the moderation that comes from its relative proximity to the Pacific Ocean, extreme winter temperatures can occasionally occur, with a record low of −48 °C (−54 °F). 100 Mile House is located in a rain shadow of the coastal mountains, resulting in reduced precipitation, much of it falling as snow.

Climate data for 100 Mile House Climate ID: 1165791; coordinates 51°38′49″N 121°18′09″W; elevation: 1,059.2 m (3,475 ft); 1981-2010 normals
Month	Jan	Feb	Mar	Apr	May	Jun	Jul	Aug	Sep	Oct	Nov	Dec	Year
Record high °C (°F)	12.0 (53.6)	13.5 (56.3)	21.0 (69.8)	30.0 (86.0)	34.5 (94.1)	34.5 (94.1)	35.5 (95.9)	36.0 (96.8)	36.0 (96.8)	29.0 (84.2)	18.3 (64.9)	12.5 (54.5)	36.0 (96.8)
Mean daily maximum °C (°F)	−2.1 (28.2)	2.1 (35.8)	7.4 (45.3)	12.2 (54.0)	17.0 (62.6)	20.3 (68.5)	23.1 (73.6)	23.3 (73.9)	18.5 (65.3)	11.1 (52.0)	2.4 (36.3)	−2.9 (26.8)	11.0 (51.8)
Daily mean °C (°F)	−7.2 (19.0)	−3.7 (25.3)	0.8 (33.4)	5.2 (41.4)	9.5 (49.1)	13.0 (55.4)	15.3 (59.5)	14.9 (58.8)	10.4 (50.7)	4.8 (40.6)	−2.1 (28.2)	−7.7 (18.1)	4.4 (39.9)
Mean daily minimum °C (°F)	−12.3 (9.9)	−9.4 (15.1)	−5.9 (21.4)	−1.9 (28.6)	2.0 (35.6)	5.7 (42.3)	7.4 (45.3)	6.3 (43.3)	2.2 (36.0)	−1.6 (29.1)	−6.5 (20.3)	−12.5 (9.5)	−2.2 (28.0)
Record low °C (°F)	−44.5 (−48.1)	−40.5 (−40.9)	−37.8 (−36.0)	−15.0 (5.0)	−9.0 (15.8)	−4.0 (24.8)	−1.5 (29.3)	−6.0 (21.2)	−10.0 (14.0)	−32.0 (−25.6)	−40.5 (−40.9)	−48.0 (−54.4)	−48.0 (−54.4)
Average precipitation mm (inches)	35.1 (1.38)	21.3 (0.84)	16.5 (0.65)	29.2 (1.15)	42.9 (1.69)	56.6 (2.23)	68.2 (2.69)	47.5 (1.87)	37.0 (1.46)	32.3 (1.27)	42.4 (1.67)	48.2 (1.90)	477.1 (18.78)
Average rainfall mm (inches)	3.0 (0.12)	2.5 (0.10)	5.0 (0.20)	20.4 (0.80)	41.9 (1.65)	56.4 (2.22)	68.2 (2.69)	47.5 (1.87)	36.3 (1.43)	26.8 (1.06)	14.0 (0.55)	1.4 (0.06)	323.4 (12.73)
Average snowfall cm (inches)	32.1 (12.6)	18.8 (7.4)	11.5 (4.5)	8.8 (3.5)	1.0 (0.4)	0.1 (0.0)	0.0 (0.0)	0.0 (0.0)	0.7 (0.3)	5.5 (2.2)	28.5 (11.2)	46.8 (18.4)	153.7 (60.5)
Average precipitation days (≥ 0.2 mm)	9.4	7.2	6.7	8.6	11.9	13.0	13.0	10.5	8.7	9.5	11.1	10.4	120
Average rainy days (≥ 0.2 mm)	1.3	1.1	2.6	6.4	11.6	13.0	13.0	10.5	8.5	8.2	4.2	0.7	81.0
Average snowy days (≥ 0.2 cm)	8.7	6.2	4.2	3.0	0.65	0.11	0.0	0.0	0.37	2.0	8.0	10.2	43.4
Source: Environment and Climate Change Canada

== Sports ==
100 Mile House is home to the 100 Mile House Wranglers who play hockey in the Kootenay International Junior Hockey League. They are a junior 'A' team and play their home games at the South Cariboo Rec Centre.

== Education ==
School District 27 Cariboo-Chilcotin operates 100 Mile Elementary School.

== Gallery ==
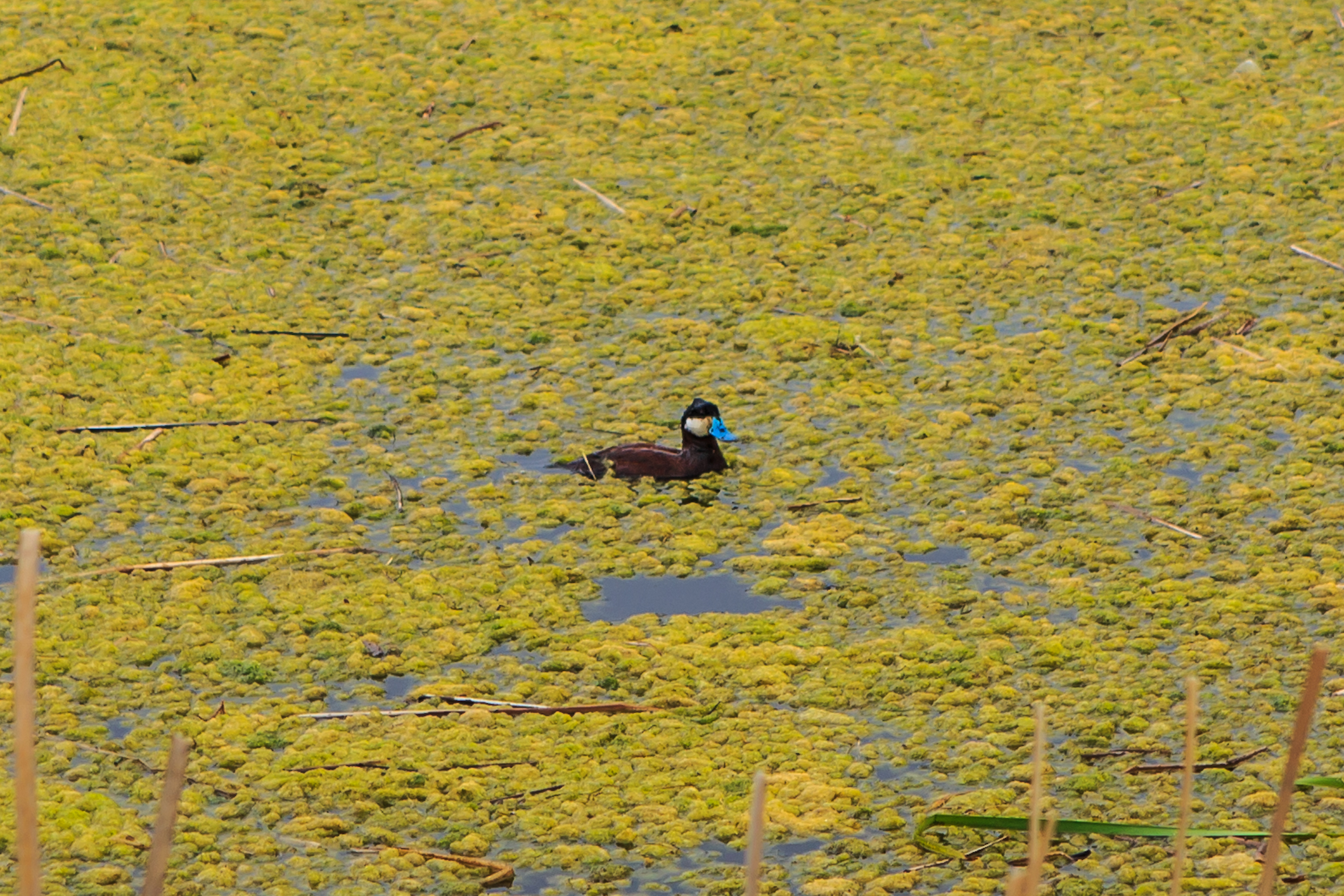
Ruddy duck in a pond near 100 Mile House

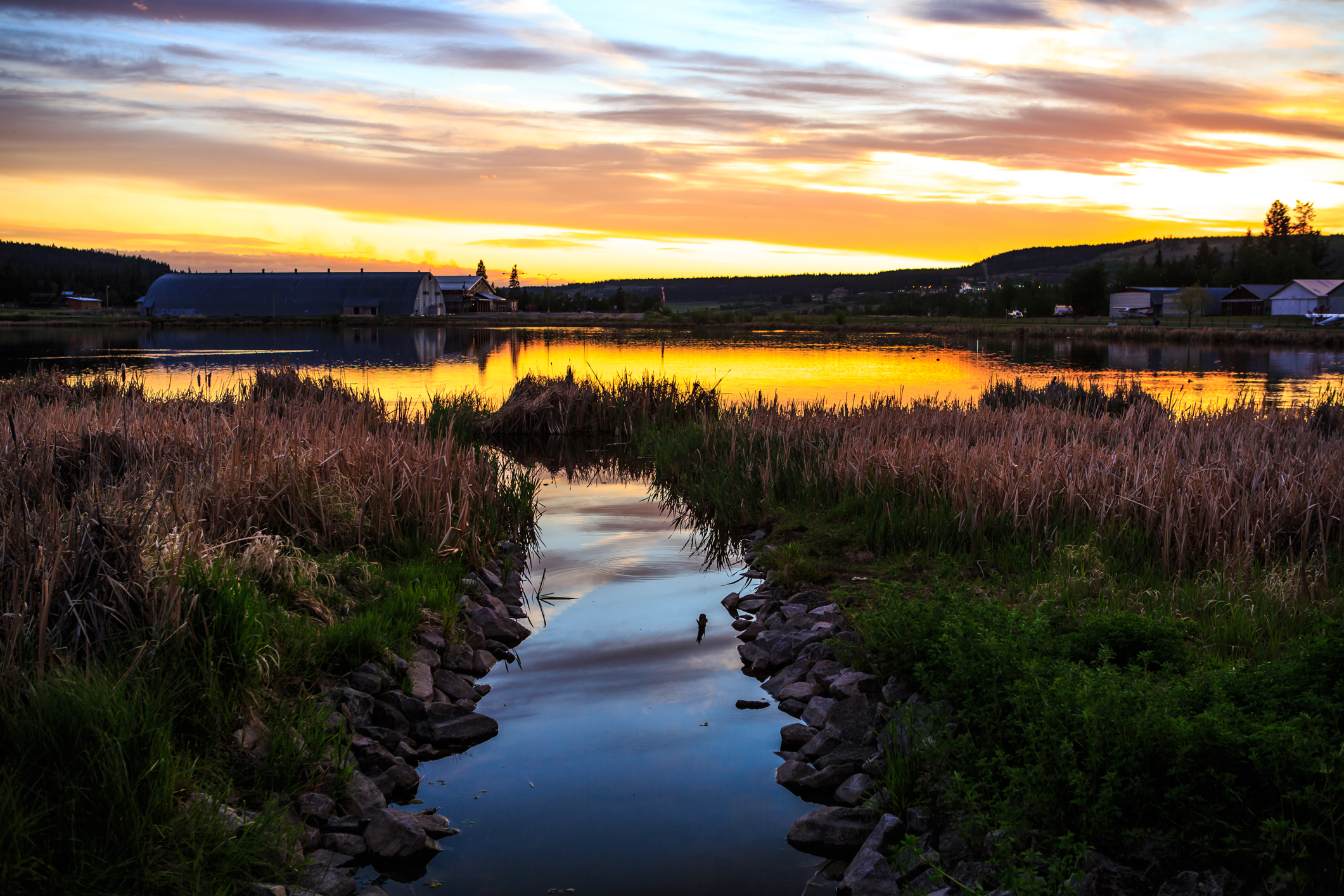
Sunset at a pond in town

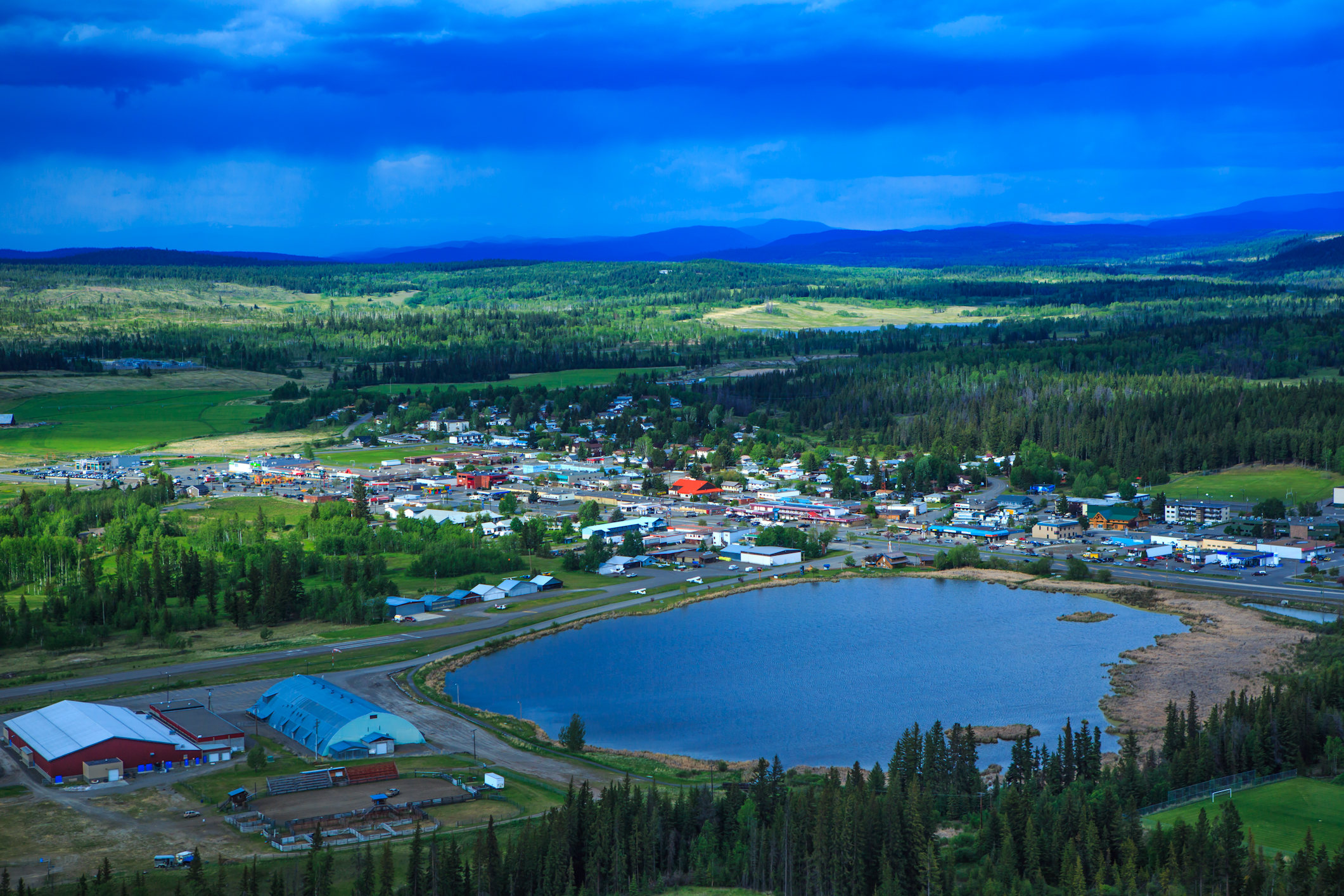
A view of town from the southwest

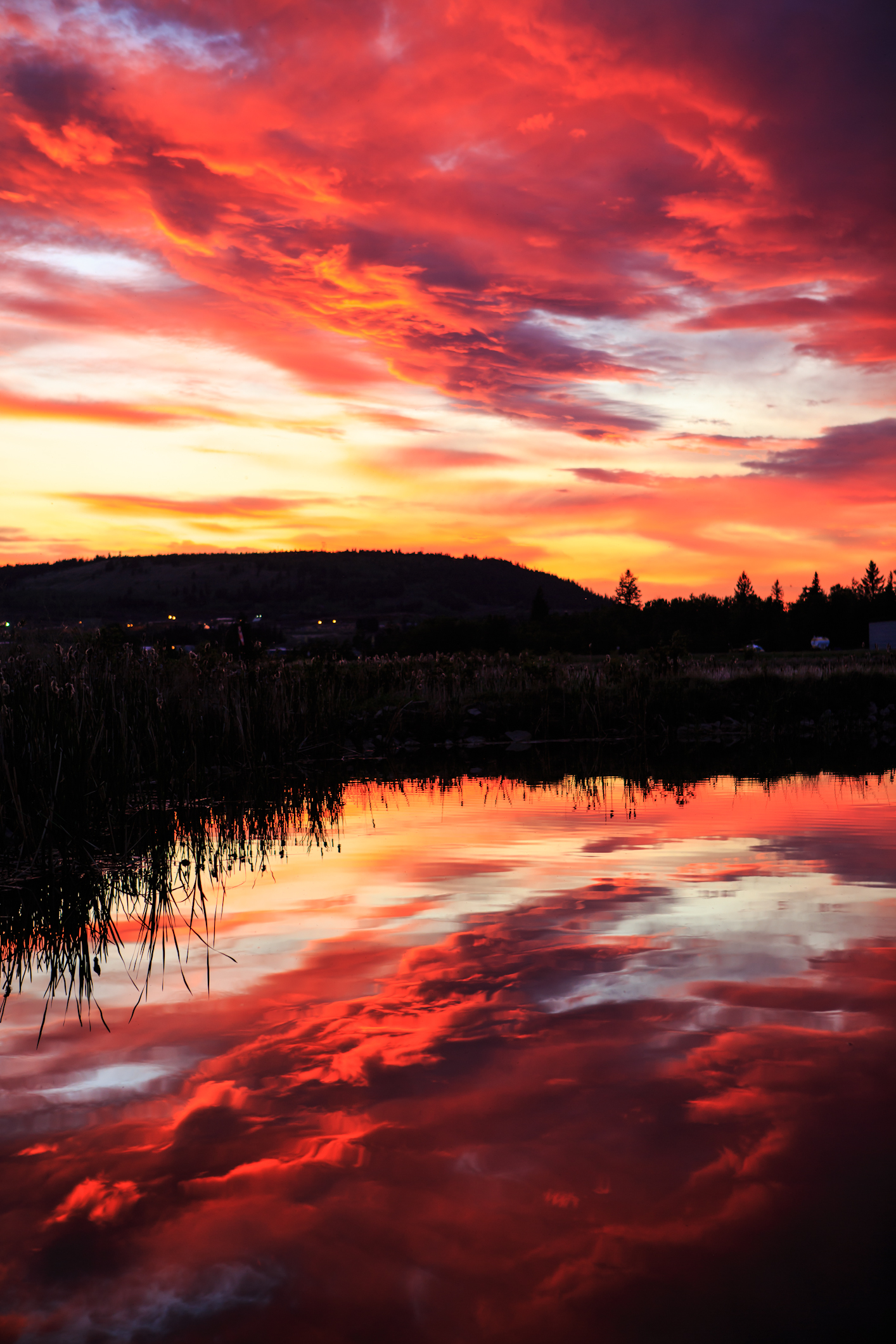
Sunset at a local pond

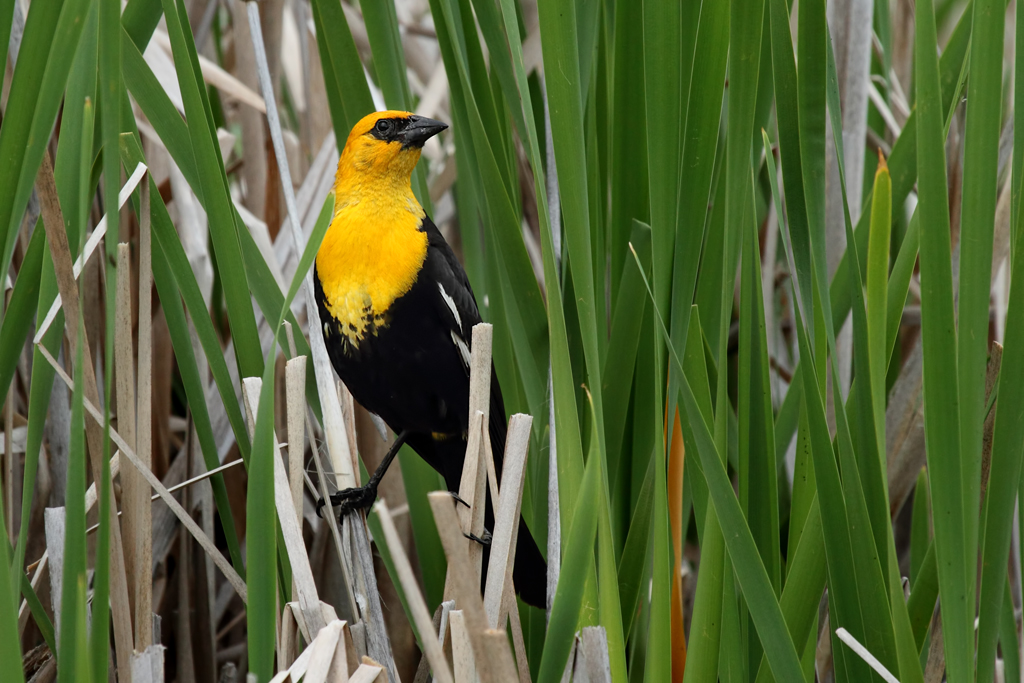
Male yellow-headed blackbird in 100 Mile House

== See also ==
- List of historic ranches in British Columbia
- 93 Mile House
