= Monte Creek =

- Community
- Location of Monte Creek in British Columbia
- Coordinates: 50°38′59″N 119°56′59″W
- Country: Canada
- Province: British Columbia
- Region: Thompson Country
- Regional district: Thompson-Nicola
- Time zone: UTC−07:00 (PT)
- Area codes: 250, 778, 236, & 672
- Highways: Highway 1 Highway 97
- Waterways: South Thompson River

Monte Creek is an unincorporated community in the Thompson region of south central British Columbia. The former ferry landing is east of the mouth of Monte Creek and on the south shore of the South Thompson River. Immediately west of the BC Highway 97 intersection on BC Highway 1, the locality is by road about 30 kilometres (19 mi) west of Chase and 28 kilometres (17 mi) east of Kamloops.

== Name origin ==
Arriving in 1862, Jacob Duck and Alex Pringle pre-empted on both sides of river, farmed, and ran a roadhouse. Duck and Pringle's became the place, postal, and telegraph name. The post office opened in 1870.

In 1882, Duck bought out his partner to become sole owner of the 1,200-hectare (3,000-acre) estate, which carried 1,000 head of cattle. In 1883, the community name shortened to Duck's and Albert Duck (see #Holmwood) joined his uncle.

Jacob Duck was the inaugural postmaster. The post office rename in 1896 derived from the creek. One suggestion describes it as "the place of mounting", where travellers switched from river travel to riding or exchanged weary horses for fresh ones. A more likely origin was either Alphonse Matteo, an early settler, or a reference to the trail beside the creek as "la monteé" by early explorers, because of the steep climb from the river. However, the local use of Ducks remained popular until the mid-1920s. The Canadian Pacific Railway (CP) renamed the station as Monte Creek around that time.

Alex Pringle retired to Ontario after divesting, but his cousin John Pringle remained at Westwold until death. After her husband Andrew died (see #Railways), John's daughter Annie Smith took over as the Monte Creek postmaster 1912–1945.

== Earlier community ==
In 1884, Jacob Duck built Brunswick House, a hotel.

In 1888, Duck sold his ranch to Hewitt Bostock and returned to England. The sale included a general store, post office, and hotel accommodation.

In 1892, the Ducks school opened. In 1894, classes moved from temporary accommodation to a new schoolhouse. After a period of closure, the school reopened in March 1905 in a residence. In 1909–10, a large one-room schoolhouse was erected.

Bostock built a larger house in 1906, a new hotel in 1911, and a new store in 1912.

A constable was stationed during the early 1920s. The Bostock family gifted St. Peter's Anglican Church, which opened Christmas Sunday, 1926. Consecrated the following July and now accessed from Old Ferry Rd (immediately south of the railway crossing), planned highway developments in the late 1970s threatened the site.

Census population: Monte Creek
Year	Pop.	±%
1951	70	—
1956	67	−4.3%
1961	53	−20.9%
1966	63	+18.9%
1971	65	+3.2%
1976		—
1981		—
1986	134	—
1991	65	−51.5%
Source: Statistics Canada * Later online census figures do not split out Monte Creek.

Although volunteer firefighters prevented a 1951 fire from spreading to the former hotel, the general store was damaged, later became apartments (see #Railways), and has heritage significance. The store likely closed permanently, relocating the post office to an Esso service station opened around this time at the then Highway 97 intersection. The three-bay station was rebranded as a Husky outlet, then the service station/convenience store became an Esso around 1988. The business closed in September 1991, when the site was expropriated for future highway development. During the early 1980s, the building included a Husky restaurant.

In 1958, the post office moved to the Chevron station. Around 1976, the Chevron closed.

In 1963, a lightning strike set alight the two-storey former hotel, leaving only the two tall brick chimneys standing. The bar closed during Prohibition in 1917 but the building had been used intermittently since that time as a boarding house.

In 1964, the school closed. The vacated building became the church hall. In 1994, the hall was moved northward from the midst of the present highway.

== Railways ==
In August 1885, the eastward advance of the CP rail head passed through the locality, regular service having started as far east as Kamloops the previous month.

In May 1906, two members of Bill Miner's gang boarded the tender of a westbound CP passenger train at Ducks and ordered the train be stopped at Mile 116 (about 7 kilometres (4 mi) west of the present Monte Creek railway crossing and 2 kilometres (1 mi) east of the British Columbia Wildlife Park, where the green commemorative plaque is located). The train was uncoupled at the rear of the baggage car (inadvertently leaving behind the express car), proceeded a little farther, and robbed of a small amount. The gang departed the locomotive between Miles 119 and 120.

In 1912, Andrew Smith was fatally run over by a passenger train. While awaiting its arrival, he had fallen asleep upon the mailbags, which lay against the side of the station platform.

In 1929, four cars of a CP grain train derailed nearby.

In 1939, when the westbound royal train made a water stop, King George VI and Queen Elizabeth came out onto the rear observation platform of their car and the king chatted with the crowd.

Although the impressive flower garden around the station had been noted for years, the garden won first prize in the 1941 annual CP competition.

During a five-minute water stop, the Duke of Edinburgh stayed in the locomotive cab, while Princess Elizabeth came out onto the rear observation platform of their car and chatted with children in the crowd.

Built in 1887, the standard-design Plan H-I-20-6 (Bohi's Type 1) split level station building, unused by passengers since the 1930s, was destroyed in 1960 by spontaneous combustion in a coal pile. The nearby former general store, which had been converted to apartments, was saved.

CP Train Timetables (Regular stop or Flag stop)
	Mile	1887	1891	1898	1905	1909	1912	1916	1919	1929	1932	1935	1939	1943	1948	1954	1960
Kamloops	128.8	Regular	Regular	Regular	Regular	Regular	Regular	Regular	Regular	Regular	Regular	Regular	Regular	Regular	Regular	Regular	Regular
Ducks	111.6	Regular	Regular	Flag	Flag	Both	Regular	Flag	Both								
Monte Creek	111.6									Both	Regular	Regular	Regular	Regular	Regular	Regular	
Pritchard	104.6						Flag	Flag	Flag	Flag	Regular	Regular	Regular	Regular	Regular	Regular	Flag
Shuswap	95.6	Regular	Regular	Regular	Regular	Both	Both	Both	Both	Flag	Flag	Flag	Flag	Flag	Flag	Flag	
Chase	93.7						Both	Regular	Both	Both	Both	Both	Both	Both	Both	Both	Regular

In April 1925, the southeastward advance of the Canadian National Railway (CN) rail head began at the junction.

Kelowna Pacific Railway operated this CN route 2000–2013.

CN Train Timetables (Regular stop or Flag stop)
	Mile	1926	1927	1933	1938	1943	1947	1948	1950	1956	1960	1963	1965
								^{a}					^{b}
Kamloops	0.0	Regular	Regular	Regular	Regular	Regular	Regular	Regular	Regular	Regular	Regular	Regular	Regular
Bostock Jctn.^{c}	11.8	Regular	Regular										
Campbell Ck. Jctn.	11.8			Regular	Regular	Regular	Regular	Regular	Regular	Regular	Regular		
Duck Meadow	23.6	Regular	Regular			Flag			Flag	Flag			
Monte Lake	28.1	Regular	Regular			Flag			Flag	Flag	Flag	Regular	Regular
Westwold	35.0	Regular	Regular	Regular	Flag	Flag	Flag	Flag	Flag	Flag	Flag	Both	Regular

^a. In early 1948, auto-rail service commenced at the termini.
^b. In 1964, CN cancelled the route, but Greyhound Canada honoured CN tickets.
^c. Point at which the CN branch leaves the CP main line. Campbell Creek to Monte Lake is the only CN grade in BC that required pusher locomotives.

== Trails and roads ==
From the 1820s until the mid-1840s, the Hudson's Bay Brigade Trail followed the steep ascent of Monte Creek. After the 1841 murder of Samuel Black, chief factor at Fort Kamloops, his coffin was transported for burial. On crossing a log bridge at the creek, the coffin fell into the water and is believed to have been interred in the vicinity. One theory places the gravesite on a hillside about 400 metres (437 yd) east of Monte Creek.

O'Keefe Ranch is about 13 kilometres (8 mi) northwest of Vernon. In 1872, Barnard's Express established a weekly stage on the new wagon road to this ranch via Kamloops and Ducks. In 1877, the road was extended to Okanagan Lake. However, the mail continued to be carried on this final leg by horseback until the stage route was extended to the lake in 1881. The stage horses were changed at Ducks.

In 1874, the Shuswap Wagon Rd was built from Ducks to Chase. In 1886, the establishment of regular service on the CP transferred the access point for Okanagan mail to Sicamous, ending the respective stage services via Ducks.

The east–west main road was the western section of Monte Creek Rd and Bostock Rd (which extended past the western edge of the church site. The southern section of Monte Creek Rd was the highway to Vernon . The 1948–49 road upgrade was probably when Highway 1 was realigned along Old Ferry Rd (south of the train track) to pass north of the church, and the Highway 97 junction moved eastward, the road approximating the present exit curve onto Highway 1. To the south, the 97 veered farther eastward in 1947 to eliminate the CN railway crossing in the vicinity of Duck Meadow.

The widening of the highway from two to four lanes was nearing completion for Kamloops–Monte Creek in October 1997. One year later, work began on the Monte Creek interchange, which included constructing the Dallas Dr frontage road and 4 kilometres (2 mi) of new road for each of highways 1 and 97. The interchange officially opened in December 1999.

In 2013, Greyhound Canada abandoned its Monte Creek stop.

The highway widening to four lanes was completed for Monte Creek–Pritchard in 2015.

== Ferry ==
Installed in 1911, the subsidised ferry connected residents on the north shore of the river with the railway and stores on the south shore. The 11-metre (36 ft) reaction ferry was guided by ropes stretched across river. At low water, when the current was weak, the operator either rowed or pulled upon the ropes. A motor was installed for this purpose in 1960. The scow could accommodate livestock, a horse-drawn wagon, or two average-sized automobiles. In 1962, ferry service was discontinued.

The Monte Creek Provincial Park, at the end of Old Ferry Rd, occupies the former south shore ferry site.

== Later community ==
The post office, which lasted into the early 2000s, is believed to have closed in 2004.

Established in 2009, Monte Creek Winery opened to the public in 2015. The venture includes 30 hectares (75 acres) of vines, organic farming, and cattle grazing.

After the May 2022 referendum passed, the Pritchard Fire Department provided fire protection from January 2023 while the Monte Creek Fire Department was becoming operational.

St. Peter's Anglican Church holds Sunday services twice monthly.

== Notable people ==
- Edward Bellew (1882–1961), first Canadian to receive the Victoria Cross (VC), resident 1907–1960.

== Holmwood ==
The hamlet is by road about 5 kilometres (3 mi) to the south. In 1900, Albert Duck bought the Cyrus Robbins Ranch, which he called Holmwood. He was the only postmaster for the post office which existed 1912–1921.

In 1913, Albert donated the land upon which St Mark's Anglican Church was erected. After St. Peter's opened at Monte Creek in 1926, St Mark's fell into disuse. In 1941, the building was deconsecrated to facilitate school use. The school closed in 1950. Although the building burned down in 1954, the cemetery has remained in use.

== Duck Range ==
By road, the area is centred about 12 kilometres (7 mi) east of Monte Creek and 9 kilometres (6 mi) south of Pritchard. The western perimeter is the intersection of Duck Range Rd with Highway 97. In these hills east of his farm, Jacob Duck ranged his cattle. Initially called Duck's Range, the amended spelling emerged in due course. In their two-storey log home, the Allans operated a small general store/post office 1908–1943. Duck Range Union Cemetery, which dates from 1909, is still in use and contains about 15 graves. A school existed 1913–1961.

== See also ==
- List of historic ranches in British Columbia
