= Cariboo Regional District =

Regional district in British Columbia, Canada

Coordinates: 52°00′N 122°00′W

Cariboo
- Regional district
- Cariboo Regional District
- Flag Logo

- Major communities

- Location in British Columbia
- Country: Canada
- Province: British Columbia
- Administrative office location: Williams Lake

Government
  - Body: Board of directors
  - Electoral areas / municipalities: A – Red Bluff–Quesnel South; B – Quesnel West–Bouchie Lake; C – Bowron Lake–Barlow Creek–Barkerville; D – Commodore Heights–McLeese Lake; E – South Lakeside–Dog Creek; F – Horsefly–Likely–150 Mile House; G – Lac La Hache–108 Mile Ranch; H – Canim Lake–Forest Grove; I – West Fraser–Nazko; J – West Chilcotin; K – East Chilcotin; L – Lone Butte–Interlakes; District of Wells; City of Quesnel; City of Williams Lake; District of 100 Mile House

Area
  - Total: 80,609.75 km^{2} (31,123.60 sq mi)

Population (2021)
  - Total: 62,931
  - Density: 0.78069/km^{2} (2.0220/sq mi)
- Website: www.cariboord.ca

The Cariboo Regional District spans the Cities and Districts of Quesnel, Williams Lake, 100 Mile House, and Wells in the Central Interior of British Columbia.

== Geography ==
The Cariboo Regional District (CRD) in the Central Interior of BC encompasses 80,252 square kilometers of land. The Cariboo and Coastal mountain ranges hug the CRD on its east and west side boundaries. The region straddles Highway 97 from 70 Mile House in the south to 5 km south of Hixon in the north. It belongs to the Pacific Time (British Columbia) zone.

=== Incorporated municipalities ===
- District Municipality of 100 Mile House
- City of Quesnel
- District Municipality of Wells
- City of Williams Lake

=== Communities ===
- Alexandria
- Australian
- Kersley
- Red Bluff
- Rich Bar

=== Other communities ===
- Alexis Creek
- Anahim Lake
- Horsefly
- Lac La Hache
- Likely
- Lone Butte
- McLeese Lake
- Nazko
- Nimpo Lake
- Riske Creek
- Tatla Lake
- Forest Grove
- 150 Mile House

== Features and Amenities ==
The Cariboo Regional District provides region-wide library services, recreational facilities, and local fire protection.

== Demographics ==
As a census division in the 2021 Census of Population conducted by Statistics Canada, the Cariboo Regional District had a population of 62,931 living in 27,614 of its 32,395 total private dwellings, a change of 1.5% from its 2016 population of 61,988. With a land area of 80,373.79 km^{2} (31,032.49 sq mi), it had a population density of 0.8/km^{2} (2.0/sq mi) in 2021.

Panethnic groups in the Cariboo Regional District (1991–2021)
| Panethnic group | 2021 | | 2016 | | 2011 | | 2006 | | 2001 | | 1996 | | 1991 | |
| Panethnic group | Pop. | % | Pop. | % | Pop. | % | Pop. | % | Pop. | % | Pop. | % | Pop. | % |
|---|---|---|---|---|---|---|---|---|---|---|---|---|---|---|
| European (Note: Statistic includes all persons that did not make up part of a visible minority or an indigenous identity.) | 48,375 | 77.8% | 48,120 | 78.89% | 48,945 | 79.24% | 50,355 | 81.49% | 54,390 | 83.41% | 56,920 | 85.95% | 49,860 | 81.98% |
| Indigenous | 11,160 | 17.95% | 10,465 | 17.16% | 10,775 | 17.45% | 9,090 | 14.71% | 7,865 | 12.06% | 5,895 | 8.9% | 7,860 | 12.92% |
| South Asian | 890 | 1.43% | 1,045 | 1.71% | 940 | 1.52% | 1,395 | 2.26% | 1,870 | 2.87% | 2,375 | 3.59% | 2,335 | 3.84% |
| Southeast Asian (Note: Statistic includes total responses of "Filipino" and "Southeast Asian" under visible minority section on census.) | 625 | 1.01% | 380 | 0.62% | 170 | 0.28% | 235 | 0.38% | 190 | 0.29% | 175 | 0.26% | 65 | 0.11% |
| East Asian (Note: Statistic includes total responses of "Chinese", "Korean", and "Japanese" under visible minority section on census.) | 495 | 0.8% | 560 | 0.92% | 740 | 1.2% | 495 | 0.8% | 540 | 0.83% | 545 | 0.82% | 405 | 0.67% |
| African | 210 | 0.34% | 165 | 0.27% | 75 | 0.12% | 110 | 0.18% | 200 | 0.31% | 220 | 0.33% | 225 | 0.37% |
| Latin American | 160 | 0.26% | 80 | 0.13% | 60 | 0.1% | 25 | 0.04% | 100 | 0.15% | 45 | 0.07% | 45 | 0.07% |
| Middle Eastern (Note: Statistic includes total responses of "West Asian" and "Arab" under visible minority section on census.) | 50 | 0.08% | 20 | 0.03% | 0 | 0% | 35 | 0.06% | 10 | 0.02% | 0 | 0% | 25 | 0.04% |
| Other (Note: Statistic includes total responses of "Visible minority, n.i.e." and "Multiple visible minorities" under visible minority section on census.) | 210 | 0.34% | 170 | 0.28% | 30 | 0.05% | 45 | 0.07% | 40 | 0.06% | 35 | 0.05% | —N/a | —N/a |
| Total responses | 62,180 | 98.81% | 61,000 | 98.41% | 61,765 | 99% | 61,790 | 99.36% | 65,210 | 99.32% | 66,225 | 99.62% | 60,820 | 99.61% |
| Total population | 62,931 | 100% | 61,988 | 100% | 62,392 | 100% | 62,190 | 100% | 65,659 | 100% | 66,475 | 100% | 61,059 | 100% |
Note: Totals greater than 100% due to multiple origin responses.

Religious groups in the Cariboo Regional District (1981−2021)
| Religious group | 2021 | | 2011 | | 2001 | | 1991 | | 1981 (Note: Note: 1981 census religious breakdown for all subdivisions and census agglomerations includes an "Eastern Non-Christian" section. Estimates derived using the Sikh, Hindu, Buddhist, and Muslim proportions of Eastern Non-Christian religious total from the 1991 census.) | |
| Religious group | Pop. | % | Pop. | % | Pop. | % | Pop. | % | Pop. | % |
|---|---|---|---|---|---|---|---|---|---|---|
| Irreligious | 39,080 | 62.85% | 31,915 | 51.67% | 26,020 | 39.9% | 20,700 | 34.03% | 13,150 | 22.25% |
| Christian | 20,930 | 33.66% | 27,935 | 45.23% | 36,895 | 56.58% | 37,340 | 61.39% | 43,225 | 73.15% |
| Sikh | 645 | 1.04% | 745 | 1.21% | 1,560 | 2.39% | 2,155 | 3.54% | 2,435 | 4.12% |
| Indigenous spirituality | 480 | 0.77% | 460 | 0.74% | —N/a | —N/a | —N/a | —N/a | —N/a | —N/a |
| Hindu | 135 | 0.22% | 60 | 0.1% | 110 | 0.17% | 145 | 0.24% | 165 | 0.28% |
| Buddhist | 125 | 0.2% | 100 | 0.16% | 135 | 0.21% | 25 | 0.04% | 30 | 0.05% |
| Muslim | 65 | 0.1% | 15 | 0.02% | 65 | 0.1% | 15 | 0.02% | 20 | 0.03% |
| Jewish | 40 | 0.06% | 0 | 0% | 10 | 0.02% | 35 | 0.06% | 15 | 0.03% |
| Other | 680 | 1.09% | 525 | 0.85% | 420 | 0.64% | 405 | 0.67% | 55 | 0.09% |
| Total responses | 62,180 | 98.81% | 61,765 | 99% | 65,205 | 99.31% | 60,820 | 99.61% | 59,090 | 99.73% |
| Total population | 62,931 | 100% | 62,392 | 100% | 65,659 | 100% | 61,059 | 100% | 59,252 | 100% |

== Rural Representative Elections ==
=== Electoral directors ===
Twelve electoral area directors and four municipal directors govern the affairs of the Cariboo Regional District. The electoral area directors are elected by area voters, and municipal directors are appointed by their municipal council. All directors serve for a four-year term.

=== Electoral areas ===
Regional District Electoral Areas are A, B, C, D, E, F, G, H, I, J, K and L.

Electoral areas have no administrative or governmental significance; they are used only to elect rural representatives to regional district boards.

== Literature ==
The Cariboo District and 100 Mile House are featured prominently in Al Purdy's poem "The Cariboo Horses" to examine the tradition of equinity against human civilization.
