= Frank Richter =

Frank Richter may refer to:

- Frank Richter Sr. (1837–1910), Canadian rancher and settler of British Columbia
- Frank Richter Jr. (1910–1977), Canadian politician and son of the above
- Frank Richter (American football) (1944–2019), American football player
- Frank Richter (footballer) (1952–2025), German footballer
- Frank Richter (rower) (born 1964), German rower
- Frank-Jürgen Richter (born 1967), German entrepreneur, economic advisor, and commentator
- Franz Xaver Richter (1709–1789), Austro-Moravian singer, violinist, composer, and conductor

== See also ==
- Francis Richter (disambiguation)
