= Francis Richter (disambiguation) =

Francis Richter (1854–1926), was an American sportswriter.

Francis Richter may also refer to:

- Frank Richter, Jr. (1910–1977), Francis Richter, Canadian politician
- Francis Xavier Richter
- Francis William Richter (1888–1938), American pianist, organist and composer
- Francis Richter, political candidate in United States House of Representatives elections, 1966

== See also ==
- Frank Richter (disambiguation)
- Charles Francis Richter, creator of the Richter Scale
