= O'Keefe Ranch =

Ranch in British Columbia, Canada

Coordinates: 50°24′22″N 119°19′15″W

The O'Keefe Ranch is a historic ranch in the Okanagan region of British Columbia, Canada on the Canadian National Railway, just northwest of Vernon. The ranch was founded in 1867 by Cornelius O'Keefe.

== Cornelius O'Keefe ==
Cornelius O’Keefe was born on July 26, 1838, near Fallowfield, Ontario. His father, Michael O’Keefe (c. 1783 – 1864) was an Irish immigrant from Kilworth, County Cork, and his mother, Esther Demers, was French Canadian. Cornelius was the seventh child of Michael and Esther, who ran a farm in Nepean Township, Upper Canada.

In 1862, having heard of the discovery of gold in British Columbia, he travelled west via the Isthmus of Panama. After an unsuccessful attempt at gold-mining in the Cariboo, he worked in 1862 on the construction of the Cariboo Road between Clinton and Bridge Creek under Gustavus Blinn Wright. Later he helped to build 115 Mile House at Lac la Hache.

In 1866 O’Keefe met Thomas Wood, a native of Newfoundland, in the vicinity of Kamloops, where Wood had wintered a herd of cattle. The two men went into partnership, first driving the cattle to the Big Bend gold area of the Columbia River and then going overland to the Willamette valley in Oregon, where they purchased a herd of about 180 head. Subsequently, they met Thomas Greenhow, an Englishman, who also became a partner, and returned with him through Washington Territory and the Okanagan valley. Arriving at the head of Okanagan Lake in June 1867, the three men each pre-empted 160 acres of bottom land.

O’Keefe liked to tell his children that on the first rainy day on his new ranch, he built himself a chair.

By 1871 Wood had relocated his ranch. O’Keefe and Greenhow remained in partnership, establishing a small general store to serve the native people and the few settlers in the north Okanagan. In 1872 this store became the home of the valley’s first post office; O’Keefe served as postmaster until 1912. Located at the end of the wagon road into the Okanagan, the post office also became the terminus of the British Columbia Stage Line.

Sometime after his arrival O’Keefe became involved in a relationship with an Okanagan woman, Alapetsa Stalekaya, from the nearby Head of the Lake band. Together they had two children, a boy and a girl. This relationship not only improved O’Keefe’s domestic circumstances, but also established an alliance with the Okanagan. The alliance was to be strained in 1873 when O’Keefe filed an additional pre-emption on land claimed by the Okanagan but exempted from the reserve boundaries established in 1865. The disputed land was granted to the natives after a lengthy negotiation.

The 1870s were a time of dwindling markets for the cattlemen of the British Columbia interior. O’Keefe and Greenhow were content to build up their herds and use the income from their store and post office, and from a newly constructed grist mill, to purchase additional lands. By 1876 O’Keefe owned 960 acres of prime Okanagan bottom land with good access to water.

O’Keefe returned to Nepean Township in 1877 and married Mary Ann McKenna in Fallowfield on 20 November. They were to have five sons and four daughters over the next 16 years. During that time O’Keefe’s fortunes improved dramatically. The depression that had followed the gold-rush was lifted by the economic activity resulting from the building of the Canadian Pacific Railway in the early 1880s. For ranchers like O’Keefe, living near the line of construction, there was a ready market for beef and other goods. With the completion of the CPR, interior ranches gained access to new markets in coastal British Columbia and in southern Alberta, where livestock were in demand for foundation herds.

The O’Keefe Ranch, which by the mid-1890s had reached about 12,000 acres, raised cattle and sheep and had large acreages in wheat. But the successful growing of fruit in the Okanagan valley placed increasing pressure on the large cattle ranchers to sell their lands for settlement. This, coupled with a falling-off of the beef market in the late 1890s and the overgrazing of pasture lands, brought about the end of large-scale ranching in the Okanagan. O’Keefe was one of the last to sell. Having previously subdivided and sold about 3,000 acres, he disposed of most of his remaining holdings in 1907 to the Land and Agricultural Company of Canada.

Mary Ann O’Keefe had died in 1899, leaving O’Keefe, at the age of 63, with eight surviving children. He returned to Fallowfield and, on 8 January 1900, married Elizabeth Theresa Tierney. The couple had three sons and three daughters, the last child born when Cornelius was 76. After 1907 O’Keefe invested in town lots in Vernon and constructed theatres there and in Kamloops. A justice of the peace, he also served as director of the British Columbia Cattle Association, director of the Okanagan and Spallumcheen Agricultural Society, and president of the Vernon Jockey Club. He was active in the Conservative party and in 1911 was elected honorary president of the Vernon Conservative Association. He lived until his death in his lovely ranch house, which remained in the family’s hands until 1977 and is preserved today as an historic site.

== O'Keefe Ranch Historic Site ==
O'Keefe Ranch is an historic site situated 12 km north of the City of Vernon. It was originally opened by Cornelius and Elizabeth O'Keefe's youngest son, Tierney. Tierney and his wife Betty operated the ranch as a family business for 10 years, until they sold the ranch to the Devonian Group of Charitable Foundations, who in turn sold it to the City of Vernon for $1 to be operated as an historic site in perpetuity.

Today, O'Keefe Ranch is operated by the O'Keefe Ranch and Interior Heritage Society, a non-profit group. It is also a registered charity. The ranch is open to the public each year from approximately May until October, and offers public programming and events. Each year, between 2,000 and 3,000 elementary school children visit the ranch for educational programs, including tours of the O'Keefe Mansion, Balmoral Schoolhouse and general store.

The O'Keefe Ranch houses approximately 10,000 artifacts, of which 2,500 originally belonged to the O'Keefe family. The O'Keefe family's original textual documents, books and photographs are housed in an on-site museum and archives and are available to the public for viewing. A portion of these archival materials have also been digitized and can be viewed online through the Digitized Okanagan History project.

== Historic buildings ==
O'Keefe Ranch has retained several original buildings from the 19th century, many of which are open to the public from May until October for self-guided tours. They are decorated as they would have been during the 19th century.

=== St. Anne's Church ===
St. Anne's Church was built in 1889 to service the North Okanagan. It is one of the earliest extant churches built in the North Okanagan and was originally a Roman Catholic church. Today it is open to the public for viewing during the ranch's open season and is outfitted with original pews, pump organ and Oblate priest's vestments. The church is also available as a wedding venue.

=== Blacksmith shop ===
The ranch is home to a blacksmith shop, though it is not an original building. Cornelius O'Keefe's 19th-century blacksmith shop was located across the highway, on the land that is now the Spallumcheen Golf Course. The current building was reconstructed in the 1960s from found materials, and houses the family's original Peter Wright anvil and other early tools.

=== General store ===
The original general store was opened in 1870 and remained in use until 1919, when it was torn down. Today visitors can stroll through a reproduction of the original store that was constructed in the 1960s with found materials. It is outfitted with numerous 19th-century artifacts, including Cornelius O'Keefe's original safe and postal scales.

=== Log house ===
Cornelius and Mary Ann O'Keefe's original log house, built c. 1876. Visitors are able to tour the house and view the parlour, kitchen, and upstairs bedroom. In 1882, Canada's Governor General, the Marquis of Lorne visited the Okanagan for a hunting trip and was put up in this log home.

=== Chinese cooks house ===
This small house, constructed around 1890, housed the family's Chinese cooks who worked on site.

=== O'Keefe Mansion ===
The mansion was constructed in stages beginning in 1886, and was completed by 1896. Today, it is the only building on the ranch where visitors may sign up for a guided tour. It houses numerous pieces of original 19th-century furniture purchased by the O'Keefe family, as well as a Mermod Freres music box, a Steck baby grand piano, and a 115-piece set of Meissen Porcelain.

=== Greenhow Museum ===
The Greenhow Museum is a museum adapted from a house constructed in 1941, over the original foundation of the Greenhow Mansion. The Greenhow Mansion was commissioned by Elizabeth Greenhow and constructed in 1892. It was destroyed by fire in 1939, after which the present building was reconstructed. Today, the Greenhow Museum is divided into galleries with rotating annual exhibitions, open to visitors during the ranch's open season from May to October. The Greenhow Museum also houses the ranch's archives and contains thousands of original documents, books and photographs.

=== Cowboy bunkhouse ===
The cowboy bunkhouse was built in the 1940s and is decorated today with original cowboy gear and reproduction bunks.

=== Balmoral Schoolhouse ===
The Balmoral Schoolhouse is not original to the ranch, but was instead built in the Balmoral region of in the Interior of British Columbia in 1912. It was moved to the ranch in the 1990s and re-staged as a Victorian schoolroom. In the entryway are display cases with early 20th-century education artifacts.

=== Schubert House ===
The Schubert House is not original to the ranch. It was built in 1892 by Augustus Schubert II, son of F. Augustus Schubert and Catherine Schubert, members of the Overlanders of 1862 group. The Schubert House was transported to O'Keefe Ranch in 1989, and visitors are able to view it during the open season from May until October. It contains numerous original Schubert family artifacts from the 19th and early 20th centuries.
