= Frank Richter Sr. =

Pioneer settler, miner, and rancher

Franz Xavier Richter, commonly known as Frank Richter (1837 –1910), was a pioneer settler, miner and rancher in 19th century Washington and British Columbia.

== Biography ==
Born in Friedland, Bohemia, then part of the Austrian Empire, Richter was the son weaver and farmer at Mildenau. At the age of 16 he emigrated to Galveston, Texas, and after a misadventure where he was wounded and captured by Indians, following the lure of the gold rushes westward, he came to Rich Bar, Washington and with the take from his placer claim opened a small store and operated a small riverboat. Hearing of good grazing land northwards in British Columbia, he sold out his mine holdings in Washington and bought 42 head of cattle with a man by the name of King, and they drove them to the Cawston area south of the Keremeos, which is located in the Similkameen Valley of British Columbia's Southern Interior in October 1864.

He pre-empted land six miles (10 km) down the Similkameen Valley from Keremeos and founded the "R" Ranch. He also worked for a while for the Hudson's Bay Company at Fort Similkameen (Fort Keremeos). With his cattle business thriving he sold the "R" ranch and started a new ranch on what is now known as the Richter Pass. In 1898 he purchased another property at Keremeos Centre, where he also operated a thriving store. In addition to an opulent new residence, Richter planted 30 acres (120,000 m^{2}) of fruit trees on the new property, which was to become the foundation of the Similkameen's still-thriving orchard industry and, alongside the Oblate priests of Okanagan Mission, is reckoned to be the founder of BC's fruit industry. The house and the Richter household became social pillars of British Columbia society and important guests were common at the Richter ranch. Among those hosted by Richter was Earl Grey in 1908.

Eventually the Richter holdings comprised 10,000 acres (40 km²) of land and 1,500 head of cattle.

FX Richter's relationship with Lucy Simla (Sʔímlaʔxʷ) (1846-1903) was a 'marriage of the land'. She was a member of the Okanagan First Nation in Vernon BC. Lucy Simla and Franz Xavier Richter had 5 sons together: Charles 1869-1949, William 1872-1922, Joseph 1874-1971, Edward 1876-1966, Hans 1877-1961. For schooling the boys had to ride on horseback to Okanagan Mission, known as Father Pandosy's Mission, and board there while attending.

Richter married Florence Elizabeth Loudon in 1894 prior to the death of his first partner Lucy Simla.

In 1910, Richter was to return to his native Austria but fell ill at a Christmas Dinner at St. Joseph's Hospital in Victoria and died within moments, of "a stroke of apoplexy". He is buried in the Keremeos cemetery.

Richter had six sons and five daughters.

Richter's youngest son, Frank Richter, Jr., was a Member of the Legislative Assembly and Minister of Agriculture and Minister of Mines in the Social Credit government of W.A.C. Bennett, representing the Similkameen riding from 1953 to 1966 and its successor riding Boundary-Similkameen from 1966 to 1975.

== Legacy ==
Richter Pass, Richter Mountain, Richter Creek and Richter Lake, all in the small mountain range at the southeast end of the Thompson Plateau between the lower Similkameen and South Okanagan, are named for him. The Richter Ranch in the same area continues in operation to this day.

== See also ==
- List of historic ranches in British Columbia
