= South Cariboo Regional Airport =

South Cariboo Regional Airport 108 Mile Airport
- IATA: ZMH; ICAO: CZML

Summary
- Airport type: Public
- Owner/Operator: Cariboo Regional District
- Location: 108 Mile Ranch, British Columbia
- Time zone: PST (UTC−08:00)
  - Summer (DST): PDT (UTC−07:00)
- Elevation AMSL: 3,129 ft / 954 m
- Coordinates: 51°44′10″N 121°19′58″W
- Website: www.cariboord.bc.ca/...

Map
- Location in British Columbia

Runways
Direction	Length		Surface
Direction	ft	m	Surface
15/33	5,292	1,613	Asphalt
- Source: Canada Flight Supplement

South Cariboo Regional Airport or 108 Mile Ranch Airport (IATA: ZMH, ICAO: CZML) is a registered aerodrome located 5.3 nautical miles (9.8 km; 6.1 mi) northwest of 108 Mile Ranch, British Columbia, Canada.

The airport is the regional aerodrome for the South Cariboo Regional District, handling over 2,000 movements a year. It provides facilities for commercial passenger service, MEDEVAC, flight training and corporate traffic.

== Facilities and aircraft ==
South Cariboo Regional Airport contains one asphalt paved runway:

- Runway 15/33 measuring 5,292 ft × 75 ft (1,613 m × 23 m)

In 2011, the airport had a total of 963 plane arrivals and departures; 72 of these were medevacs.

The airport is located within walking distance of two resorts and an 18-hole PGA golf course.

== Events ==
Each year, the airport hosts Airport Day. This event was created for locals to enjoy aviation activities and learn more about the aviation industry and, in particular, the airport as a valuable South Cariboo asset.
