= Monte Creek Provincial Park =

Provincial park in British Columbia, Canada

- IUCN category II (national park)
- Location within British Columbia
- Interactive map of Monte Creek Provincial Park
- Location: British Columbia, Canada
- Nearest city: Kamloops
- Coordinates: 50°38′59″N 119°56′50″W
- Area: 0.03 km^{2} (0.012 sq mi)
- Established: April 30, 1996
- Governing body: BC Parks

Monte Creek Provincial Park is a provincial park in British Columbia, Canada, located in the locality of Monte Creek, British Columbia. Created in 1996, it is only 3 hectares in size, and protects a forested riparian area and also quiggly hole ("kekuli") sites of the Shuswap people, which have been formally studied as an archaeological site. The location was also part of the route of the Hudson's Bay Brigade Trail to the Cariboo via Kamloops from what is now the United States, as was Monte Lake in the upper basin of the eponymous creek.
