= 100 Mile House Airport =

Airport adjacent to One Hundred Mile House, British Columbia, Canada

One Hundred Mile House Airport
- IATA: none; ICAO: none; TC LID: CAV3

Summary
- Airport type: Public
- Operator: The District of 100 Mile House
- Location: 100 Mile House, British Columbia
- Time zone: MST (UTC−07:00)
- Elevation AMSL: 3,055 ft / 931 m
- Coordinates: 51°38′33″N 121°18′25″W
- Website: www.100milehouseairport.com

Map
- Location in British Columbia

Runways
Direction	Length		Surface
Direction	ft	m	Surface
08/26	2,151	656	Asphalt
- Source: Canada Flight Supplement

One Hundred Mile House Airport (TC LID: CAV3) is a registered aerodrome located adjacent to 100 Mile House (One Hundred Mile House), British Columbia, Canada.

== History ==
In the early 1950s, aviation activity in the region began when the Jens brother, who were sawmill operators near Canim Lake, helped establish a local airstrip on part of the historic Bridge Creek Estates Ranch. The original community settlement was known as Bridge Creek House, later renamed 100 Mile House in 1862, which marked its location 100 miles from Lillooet along the Cariboo Road.

In February 1961, the 100 Mile House Flying Club was incorporated into the airstrip, with the founding members being Dave Ainsworth, Gordon Maitland, Ross Marks, and Slim Jens. In 1979, ownership of the airport was donated to District Municipality for a nominal CAD $1 by Lord Martin Cecil. The local aviation community held many large fly-ins, with small aircraft visits that totaled up to 30.

=== Present ===
Today, One Hundred Mile House Airport hosts several annual free Kids Fly Days, for local school children to introduce the local youth to aviation careers and activities. The grounds and runway are maintained by the District of 100 Mile House Public Works department.

== Facilities ==
Aircraft parking is located on the east end of the field on either side of the main apron on the grass. Fuel is not supplied at the airport, but both AV Gas and Jet Fuel are available at the nearby South Cariboo Airport through self serve. For pilots, the airport is located close to shops, restaurants, walking trails and hotels. The airport operates a 2,151 ft × 50 ft (656 m × 15 m) asphalt runway, numbered 08/26.
