= List of historic ranches in British Columbia =

Ranch	alternate names	locality/region	location/coordinates	Founded	Still operating?	Founder	Current owners	Historic events/owners
108 Mile Ranch		South Cariboo						
Basque Ranch		Fraser Canyon-Big Bar Ferry						family of Garnet Basque, historian
Ashcroft Manor	Cornwall Ranch	Thompson Country		1860s		Lieut-Gov Clement Francis Cornwall		
Boothroyd's	Canyon Gardens	Fraser Canyon-Boston Bar		1860s				
Bridge Creek Ranch	Bridge Creek Estate	South Cariboo	51°39′01″N 121°18′27″W	1912	Yes	William Cecil, 5th Marquess of Exeter		5th, 7th and 8th Marquesses of Exeter
Chilancoh Ranch	Bayliff's	Chilcotin		1886	yes	Hugh Peel Lane Bayliff and Gertrude Louise Jane Lane Bayliff (née Tindall)	R. Hugh L. Bayliff and Hellen L. Bayliff (nee von Harbou)	
Coldstream Ranch		Okanagan-Shuswap				Charles Frederick Houghton		Forbes G. and Charles Albert Vernon
Cottonwood Ranch	Cottonwood	North Cariboo	53°03′00″N 122°09′15″W	1860s				
Currie Ranch	Currie's (name of trainstop)	Pemberton-Mount Currie		1870s				John Currie
Diamond 'S' Ranch	"Carson's Kingdom"	Pavilion (Fraser Canyon-Lillooet)		1860s		Robert Carson		
Dominion Ranch	Semlin Ranch	Thompson Country				Charles Semlin, 12th Premier of BC		
Douglas Lake Ranch		Nicola Country		1886				"Chunky" Woodward Bernie Ebbers of Worldcom
Gang Ranch		Chilcotin-Fraser Canyon		1870s			Saudi Money	
Empire Valley Ranch	Henry Koster	Fraser Canyon-Big Bar Ferry			late 1850s			Clarence Bryson since 1956
Fintry		Okanagan-Shuswap						
Giusachan Ranch		Okanagan (Kelowna)			late 1850s		Aberdeen Holdings	Lord Aberdeen
Gun Creek Ranch		Bridge River Country						
Hat Creek Ranch		Thompson-Bonaparte		1860s				
Hungry Valley Ranch		Chilcotin					John Wells`	
Monte Creek Ranch	Duck's Ranch	Thompson Country		1850s		Jacob Duck bought from the original homesteader, a Mexican known only as "Monte"		Hewitt Bostock
Moha Ranch		Bridge River		1870s				
O'Keefe Ranch		North Okanagan		1867		Cornelius O'Keefe		
'R' Ranch		Similkameen		1864		Francis Xavier Richter		Francis Xavier Richter
Rexmount Ranch		Bridge River						
Sky Ranch		Chilcotin						
