= BC Transit Health Connections =

Bus Service

- Locale: British Columbia
- Service type: bus service, paratransit, intercity bus
- Alliance: BC Transit
- Fuel type: Diesel

BC Transit Health Connections or simply Health Connections are a supplementary interregional public transit bus service provided by BC Transit in various communities throughout the province of British Columbia. While, as the title implies, the scheduled services are geared towards passengers needing to reach an urban centre for health reasons, all are able to use the service if space allows.

== Operations ==
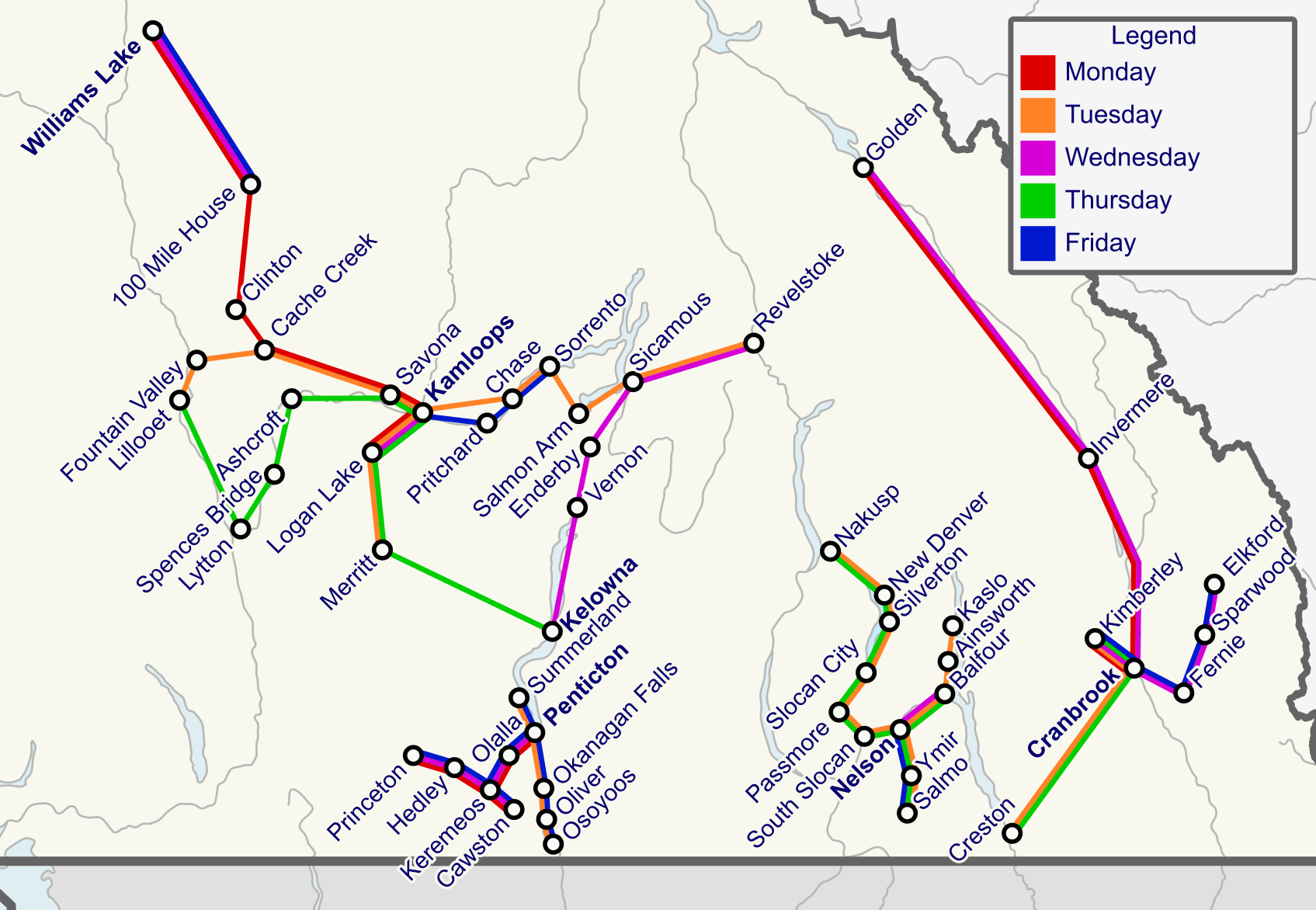
BC Transit Health Connections services in October 2019. This map does not show other BC Transit Intercity services.

Health connections buses are marked BC Transit buses. While they operate on a fixed schedule along a fixed route (with exceptions), no number designation is given to the buses and they are generally not listed in local transit guides, timetables or on departure boards. Like other BC Transit services, Health Connections buses are operated by a contracted operator and not by BC Transit itself. The services are funded in part by the provincial government as a complement to the Travel Assistance Program. In February 2020, BC Transit announced that no direct connection between Logan Lake and Kamloops would be maintained after that March, with all services routing direct to Merritt instead.

== Service and routing ==
Health Connections operate within and between various transit systems already served by BC Transit, and sometimes parallel existing routes on a different schedule. Nearly all Health Connections operate on only select days or the week, while others only operate on demand. The routes are the only passenger transportation available to some major communities that are currently lacking in any form of intercity bus.

Route name	Communities served enroute	Notes
100 Mile House/Williams Lake	100 Mile House, Williams Lake	
Creston/Cranbrook	Creston, Cranbrook	
Elkford/Cranbrook	Elkford, Sparwood, Fernie, Cranbrook	
Golden/Cranbrook	Golden, Invermere, Cranbrook	
Kamloops/Chase	Kamloops, Chase, Pritchard	
Kamloops/Lillooet	Kamloops, Fountain Valley, Cache Creek, Savona, Kamloops	
Kamloops/Logan Lake	Kamloops, Logan Lake	To be terminated March 4th, 2020.
Kamloops/Logan Lake/Merritt	Kamloops, Logan Lake, Merritt	Logan Lake will be eliminated from the route on March 4th, 2020.
Kamloops/Logan Lake/Merritt/Kelowna	Kamloops, Logan Lake, Merritt, Kelowna	Logan Lake will be eliminated from the route on March 4th, 2020.
Kamloops/Lytton	Lillooet, Spences Bridge, Ashcroft, Cache Creek, Savona, Kamloops	
Kamloops/Revelstoke	Kamloops, Chase, Sorrento, Salmon Arm, Sicamous, Revelstoke	
Kamloops/Williams Lake	Williams Lake, 100 Mile House, Clinton, Cache Creek, Kamloops	
Kimberley/Cranbrook	Kimberley, Cranbrook	
Penticton/Princeton	Penticton, Olalla, Cawston, Keremeos, Hedley, Princeton, Coalmont	Parallels South Okanagan-Similkameen route 50
Penticton/Summerland/Osoyoos	Summerland, Penticton, Okanagan Falls, Oliver, Osoyoos	Parallels South Okanagan-Similkameen routes 30, 20, and 40
Revelstoke, Kelowna	Revelstoke, Sicamous, Enderby, Vernon, Kelowna	
