= Forest Grove, British Columbia =

Human settlement in British Columbia, Canada

Coordinates: 51.766°N 121.099°W

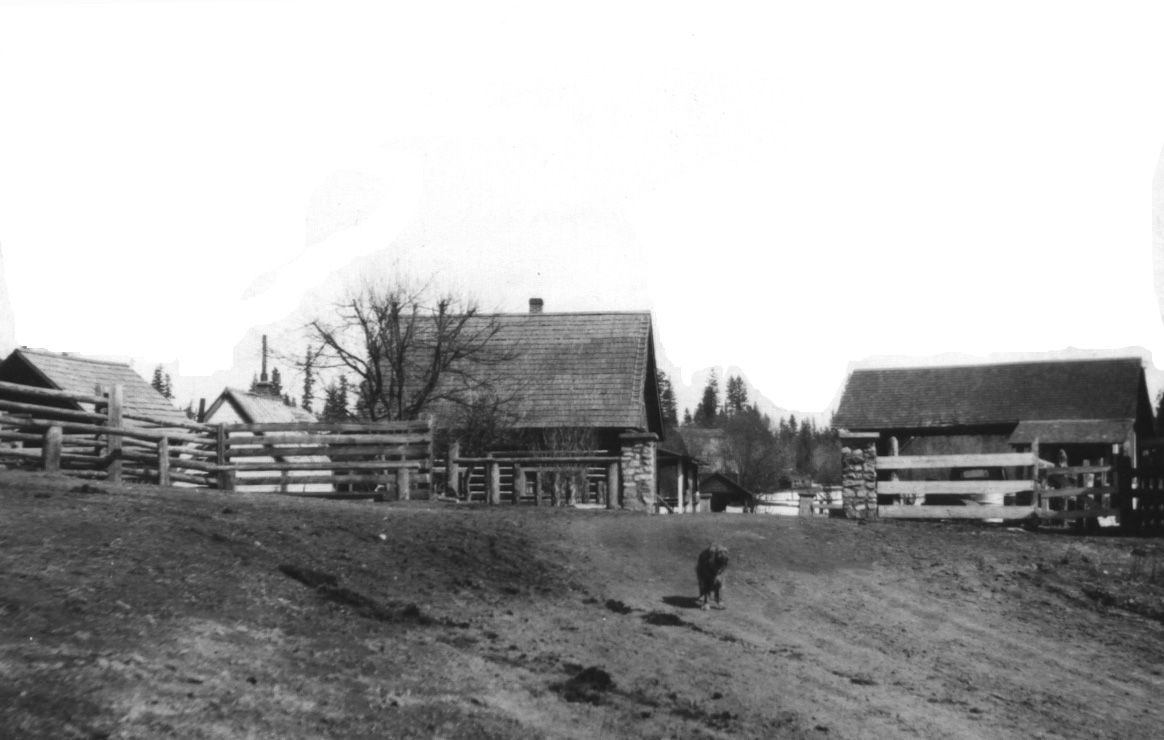
Forest Grove Trading Post, 1940's

Forest Grove is an unincorporated place situated just off Highway 97, near 100 Mile House, in the Cariboo region of British Columbia, Canada. The population is 295. Prior to World War I settlers were making their way into the area and building small farms and/or living off the fur trade. One early settler, Oliver Philips, named the area Forest Grove after a town by the same name in Oregon. By 1917 Forest Grove consisted of a lodge, general store, post office, billiard hall, trading post, a large barn as well as a storage building. The first school was built about 1922 and serviced just the local area. Due to transportation difficulties communities further afield had their own small schools. By World War II farming was giving way to forestry as the main industry.

== History ==
A Forest Grove History project is under way. The objective is to bring together as much biographical material as possible relating to families or individuals that settled in the Forest Grove area between 1910 and 1950.

== Present day ==
Forest Grove remains a small community servicing the retirement and resort business on surrounding lakes. In the general area there is an elementary school, library, curling rink, grocery /liquor /gas store, fire hall, legion, community hall, hardware / giftware / building / garden supplies store and post office. There remains some farm activity as well as forestry.
