= Keremeos Centre, British Columbia =

Keremeos Centre is a ghost town located in the Similkameen Country region of British Columbia, Canada. The town is situated on the west side of Keremeos Creek.
