= Nimpo Lake, British Columbia =

Nimpo Lake
- Location of Nimpo Lake in British Columbia
- Coordinates: 52°20′00″N 125°09′00″W
- Country: Canada
- Province: British Columbia
- Area codes: 250, 778

Nimpo Lake is a four-season outdoor—tourism and ranching unincorporated community in the West Chilcotin of the Cariboo Chilcotin Coast region; via the B.C. Highway #20 from the Central Interior of British Columbia, Canada. Nimpo Lake is also the home base of the "B.C. Floatplane Association".
