= Lac la Hache =

Human settlement in British Columbia, Canada

Coordinates: 51.82°N 121.47°W

Lac La Hache is a recreational and retirement community in the Cariboo region of British Columbia, Canada. Located on the shore of Lac La Hache alongside British Columbia Highway 97 near the regional centre of 100 Mile House, the community's origins date to the days of the Cariboo Gold Rush and the Cariboo Wagon Road, for which it provided an important roadhouse. Lac La Hache, or "The Lake of the Axe" as it translates to, was named, during the fur trade era, after the unfortunate incident of a French-Canadian voyageur who lost his axe head while chopping a hole in the ice. It is a town rich in history, as it sits along the Gold Rush Trail.

== History ==
=== Pre-European contact ===
Before colonization, both the Secwépemc and Tsilhqot'in First Nations were active in the area. The Tsilhqot'in referred to the lake as Kumatakwa, Chief or Queen of the waters. The Secwépemc built pit houses near the present day municipality of Lac La Hache.

=== Recent history ===
In 1862, legends state that a French Canadian fur trader dropped his axe in a nearby lake, giving the name to the settlement (Lake of the Axe).

By the 1860s, the area was invested in the "gold fever" in the area.

In 1891, the Lac La Hache subdistrict had a population of 207.

== See also ==
- 108 Mile Ranch
