= Fort Similkameen =

Hudson's Bay Company fort in British Columbia

Fort Similkameen is the site of a former Hudson's Bay Company fort in the Similkameen region of British Columbia. Following a move to a nearby location near the fort was also called Fort Keremeos and stood at the centre of present day Cawston.
