= 108 Mile Ranch =

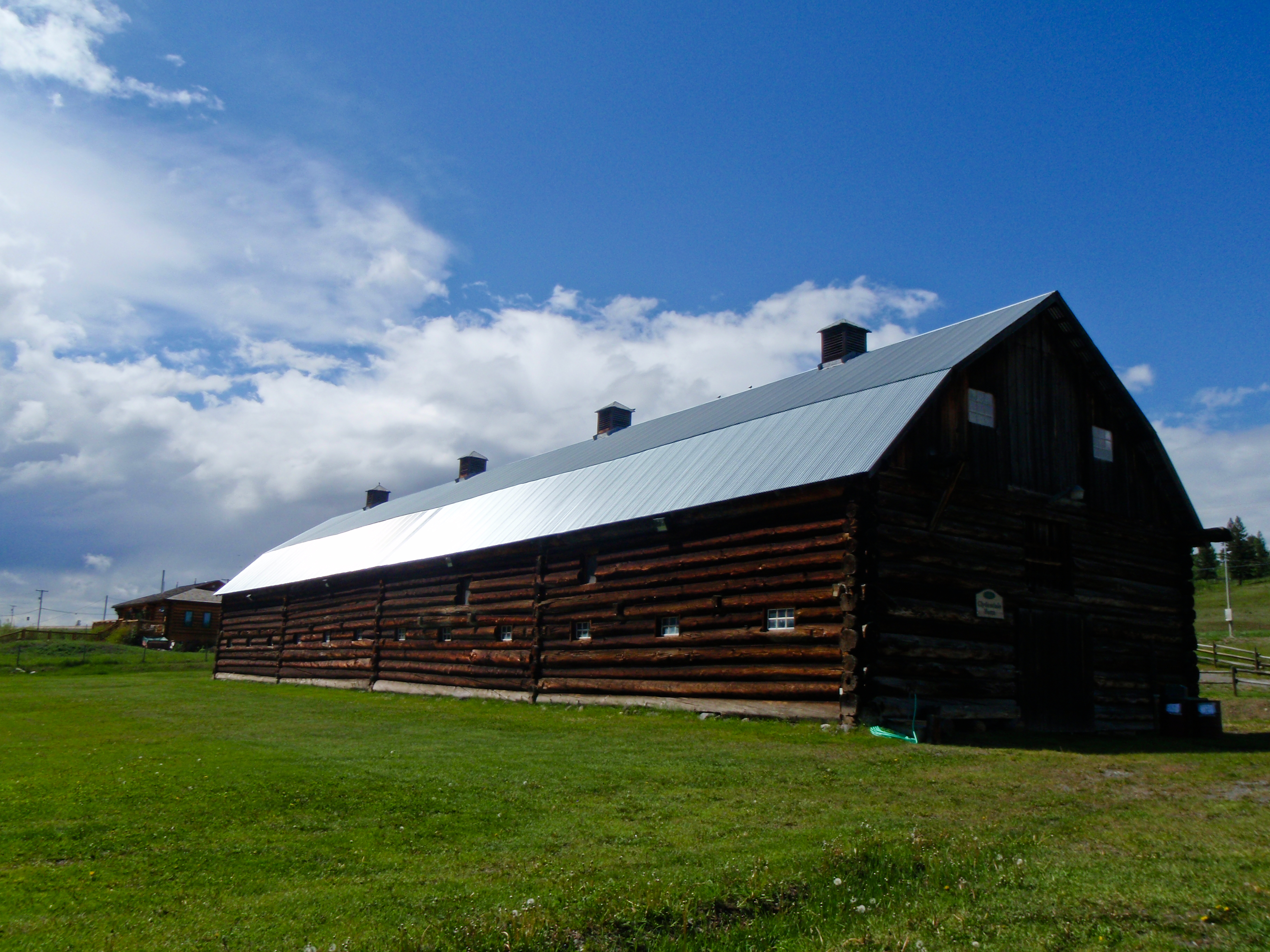

- Location of 108 Mile Ranch in British Columbia Location of 108 Mile Ranch in Canada
- Coordinates: 51°45′N 121°21′W
- Country: Canada
- Province: British Columbia
- Time zone: UTC−07:00 (PT)
- Area codes: 250, 778

108 Mile Ranch is a residential community of 700 homes situated in the South Cariboo region of British Columbia located in a historic area of ranches and lakes.

Historically, en route to the great Cariboo Gold Rush, a few of the travellers settled here.

In the late 1960, Arthur and Henry Block developed the 108 Ranch into a weekend holiday venue, building a golf course, with a restaurant, coffee shop and pro shop, a hotel and an airport. It grew from an original 25 families to a large scale residential community.

A feature of the 108 community is its green belt lands. Comprising more than 1,500 acres (610 ha) these community parklands include 108 and Sepa Lakes, Walker Valley and many small patches scattered around the ranch.

108 Mile Ranch is about 12 km (7.5 mi) north of 100 Mile House, just off Highway 97. South Cariboo Regional Airport is the regional facility for the South Cariboo. Located on Highway 97, The 108 Heritage Site is a tourist attraction with its growing number of restored buildings, including the largest log barn in Canada.

== Transportation ==
=== Airports ===
South Cariboo Regional Airport or 108 Mile Ranch Airport (IATA: ZMH, ICAO: CZML) is a registered aerodrome located 5.3 nautical miles (9.8 km; 6.1 mi) northwest of the city. It is the regional aerodrome for the South Cariboo Regional District, with capabilities of handling commercial passenger service, MEDEVAC, flight training, and corporate traffic.
