= YWL =

YWL or ywl may refer to:

- Williams Lake Airport, British Columbia, Canada, IATA airport code YWL
- Western Lalu language, in China, ISO 639-3 language code ywl
