= Cariboo Adventist Academy =

Location
- 1405 South Lakeside Drive; Williams Lake, British Columbia, V2G 3A7; Canada; 52.11195°N 122.11450°W

Information
- School type: Independent K–12 School
- Religious affiliation: Seventh-day Adventist Church
- Founded: 1961
- Principal: Adam Pardy
- Grades: K to 12
- Language: English
- Colours: Blue and White
- Yearbook: Reflections
- Website: www.caawl.ca

Cariboo Adventist Academy is an independent K-12 Christian school located in Williams Lake, British Columbia, Canada, that is affiliated with the Seventh-day Adventist Church. The school serves the Cariboo region of British Columbia.

== History ==
In the 1950s, three Seventh-day Adventists opened two logging operations in the Cariboo region of British Columbia, drawing Adventist loggers and mill workers to the area. One-room schools were started in various logging camps around Williams Lake. These schools moved from camp to camp with workers and their families, most of whom were Adventist. A Seventh-day Adventist Church opened in 1956 in Williams Lake, including a one-room Adventist school in the church building. In 1958, a school building was constructed in town on the corner of 7th and Pinchbeck, with one classroom being used. Classes were offered there for the 1959-60 school year and it opened permanently in 1961.

The school added a classroom in 1962. In 1968, a third classroom was opened. The school expanded to four classrooms in the following year with the addition of a grade 10 program. The school soon ran out of room and the school moved to a property located on the south shore of Williams Lake.

The new school opened on January 31, 1971 with the name, Cariboo Adventist Junior Academy. The school was initially designed as an open school concept without walls. The school continued to expand quickly: in 1977, an addition was completed which added a basement gym, a woodworking shop, and a home economics room. In 1979, the school completed another expansion to grade 12, at which point the school was renamed Cariboo Adventist Academy. Around this time, the school gym was converted into an industrial arts centre.

In 1987, another school building was opened, which contained a new gymnasium, a science lab, and classrooms for high school. Cariboo Adventist Academy has continued to operate in these same school buildings with enrolment spanning between 80-160 students over the years.

== Academics ==
Cariboo Adventist Academy follows the curriculum established by the British Columbia Ministry of Education, and upon completion of Grade 12, its graduates receive the Dogwood Diploma which is awarded by the same. The school is accredited by the Board of Regents of the General Conference of Seventh-day Adventists, and is classified as a Group 1 school under the BC Independent Schools Act. Cariboo Adventist Academy is a member of the Federation of Independent School Associations in British Columbia, belonging to the Associate Member Group.

The school is divided into an elementary division which runs from grades K-7, and a high school division which runs from grades 8-12. CAA offers courses in Bible, English, Mathematics, Science, Biology, Chemistry, Physics, Socials, Physical education, French, and Music. Students have the option to take elective courses offered through West Coast Adventist School or through GROW.

== Athletics ==
CAA is a member of the Canadian Adventist School Athletics association and competes in volleyball and flag football tournaments organized by CASA each year in Burnaby, Abbotsford, and Kelowna. Cariboo also participates in volleyball tournaments hosted by Burman University. At the junior level, CAA also competes locally in volleyball, floor hockey, and basketball, hosting the annual tournaments for volleyball and basketball.

Historically, CAA also had a gymnastics team which travelled around the province putting on gymnastics routines while promoting a drug-free lifestyle.

== Extracurriculars ==
In the 1970s, the younger students at CAA participated in a choir known as the Royalaires, that would tour around the Cariboo region. By the 1980s, CAA had an award-winning band and choir that would go on frequent tours around British Columbia and Alberta. Today, the band program is still active.

Students at Cariboo Adventist Academy have also participated in mission trips. In the school's first mission trip in 1979, students went to Corozal Town, Belize, where they built a service building at a church school. Later in the 1990s, CAA students went on multiple mission trips to Mexico, where they helped build an orphanage.

== See also ==
- Seventh-day Adventist Church
- Seventh-day Adventist education
- List of Seventh-day Adventist secondary and elementary schools
