= Williams Lake, British Columbia =

Williams Lake
- City
- City of Williams Lake
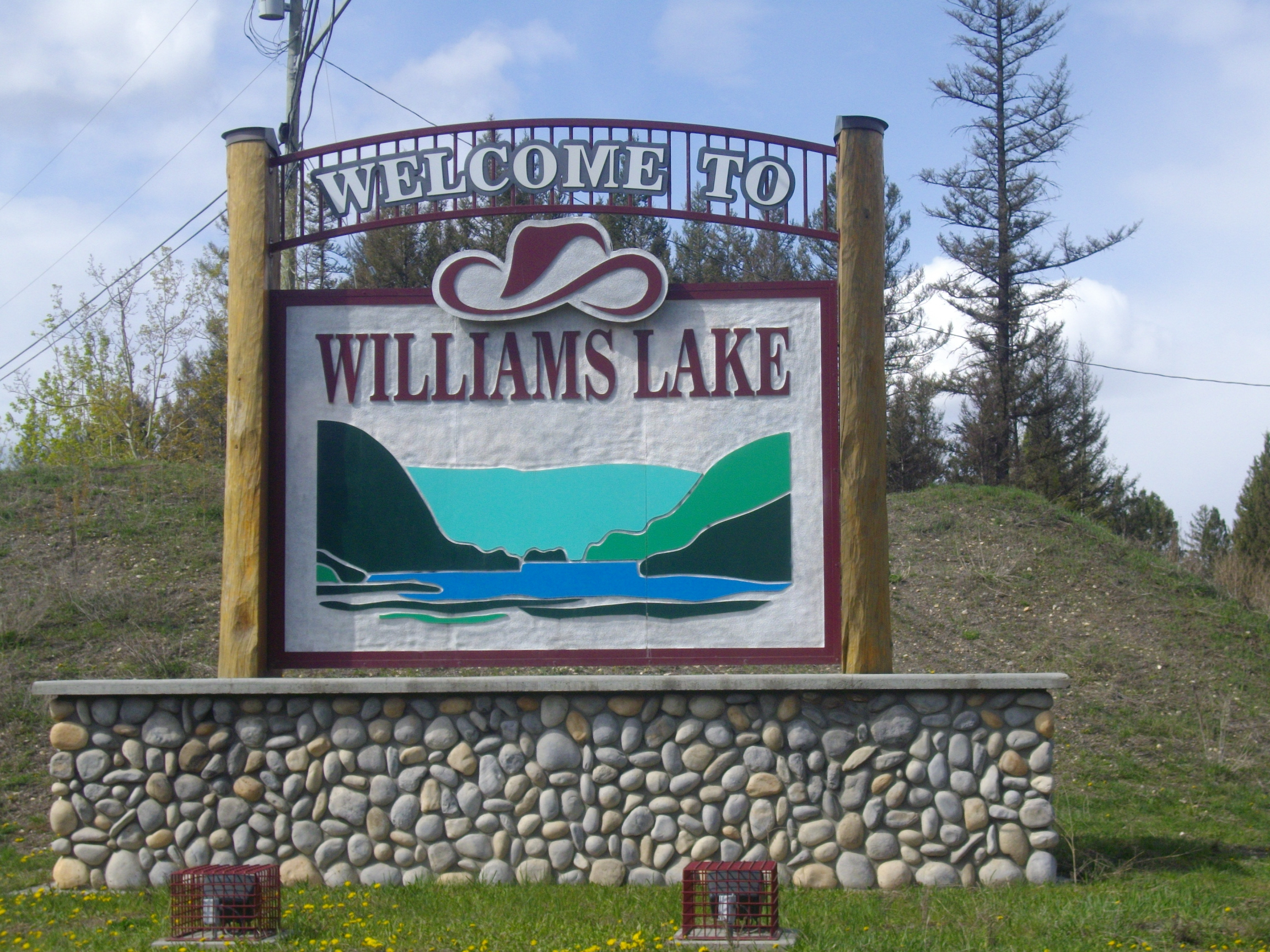
- Williams Lake's welcome sign
- Nicknames: BC's Stampede Capital, Mural Capital of the Cariboo Chilcotin
- Location in British Columbia
- Coordinates: 52°07′45″N 122°08′24″W
- Country: Canada
- Province: British Columbia
- Region: Cariboo
- Regional district: Cariboo
- Incorporated: 1929

Government
  - Governing body: Williams Lake City Council
  - Mayor: Surinderpal Rathor
  - Chief Administrative Officer: Gary Muraca

Area
  - Land: 33.13 km^{2} (12.79 sq mi)
  - Census agglomeration: 2,656.73 km^{2} (1,025.77 sq mi)
  - Population centre: 40.36 km^{2} (15.58 sq mi)
- Elevation: 586 m (1,923 ft)

Population (2016)
  - Total: 10,947
  - Density: 327/km^{2} (850/sq mi)
  - Census agglomeration: 23,608
  - Census agglomeration density: 7/km^{2} (18/sq mi)
  - Population centre: 11,906
  - Population centre density: 307.4/km^{2} (796/sq mi)
- Time zone: UTC−07:00 (PT)
- Forward sortation area: V2G
- Area codes: 250, 778, 236, 672
- Highways: Highway 97; Highway 20
- Website: williamslake.ca

Williams Lake is a city in the Central Interior of British Columbia, in the central Cariboo. Affectionately referred to as "Willy's Puddle" by locals, Williams Lake is one of the largest cities, by population of metropolitan area in the Cariboo region.The city is famous for the Williams Lake Stampede, which is the second largest professional rodeo in Canada, after only the Calgary Stampede.

== History ==
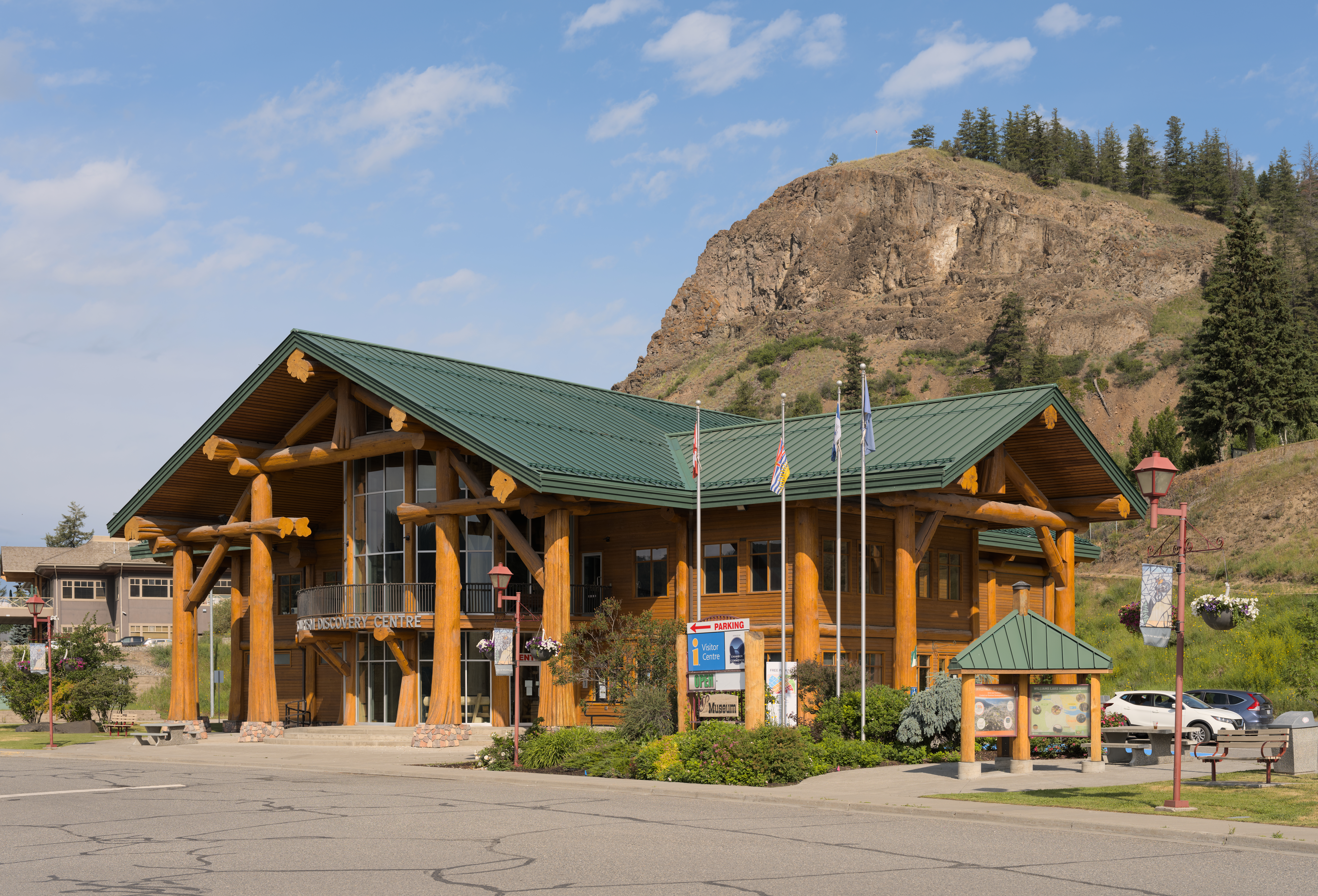
Williams Lake Visitor Centre

Williams Lake is named in honour of Secwépemc chief William, whose counsel prevented the Shuswap from joining the Tsilhqot'in in their uprising against the settler population.

The story of Williams Lake (called T'exelc by local First Nations communities of the region) begins as much as 4000 years ago. The story of Williams Lake written by those coming into the region from outside begins in 1860 during the Cariboo Gold Rush when Gold Commissioner Philip Henry Nind and William Pinchbeck, a constable with the British Columbia Provincial Police, arrived from Victoria to organize a local government and maintain law and order.

At the time, two pack trails led to the goldfields, one from the Douglas Road and the other through the Fraser Canyon. They met at Williams Lake, which made it a good choice for settlers and merchants. By 1861, Commissioner Nind had built a government house and had requested the funds to build a jail. With the centre of local government being at Williams Lake, the miners and businessmen all had to travel there to conduct their business and soon the town had a post office, a courthouse, a roadhouse and the jail that Nind had requested. Meanwhile, William Pinchbeck had not been idle and had built his own roadhouse, saloon and store. Eventually he would own most of the valley.

In 1863, the town was excited by the news of the construction of Cariboo Road, believing it would pass through their already established and important trading centre. However, the roadbuilder Gustavus Blin Wright rerouted the original trail so that it bypassed Williams Lake and went through 150 Mile House instead.

The Williams Lake by-pass doomed the city and accusations flew that Gustavus Blin Wright had changed the route for his own personal benefit as he owned a roadhouse at Deep Creek along the new route. Regardless of Wright's motives, Williams Lake was forgotten and wouldn't be reborn until over half a century later in 1919 with the construction of the Pacific Great Eastern Railway, later BC Rail and now CN Rail.

On July 5, 1867, the Roman Catholic Church established St. Joseph's Mission halfway between Williams Lake and 150 Mile House. In 1891, the mission opened an Indian residential school, called St. Joseph's School. The school became one of the most notorious Indian residential schools over the 90 years it operated. A St. Joseph's School reunion in 2013 in Williams Lake led to the creation of Orange Shirt Day, a memorial to the victims of the Canadian Indian residential school system that is observed nationally. A memorial monument to the victims of the school was also erected in 2013, in Boitanio Park.

In 1891, the subdistrict of Williams Lake had a population of 410.

In July 2017, the province of British Columbia declared a state of emergency with more than 200 fires burning, mostly in the central region of the province. Residents from Williams Lake along with other communities in central British Columbia such as Ashcroft and 100 Mile House were given evacuation orders and most of those affected went to either Prince George or Kamloops.

On August 15, 2022, the City of Williams Lake officially proclaimed the third week of August as LGBTQ2S Pride Week for the first time in the city's history, and raised the inclusive pride flag at city hall.

== Economy ==
The primary industries in Williams Lake are forestry, logging, sawmilling, mining, university and ranching.

Timber has a long history in Williams Lake, dating back to the 1950s when many independent sawmills such as the Jacobson Brothers operated in town. In the 1990s and 2000s, the independent sawmills sold their businesses or merged to become larger operations. Currently, West Fraser Timber and Tolko Industries operate sawmills in Williams Lake.

The Gibraltar Mine is the second-largest open-pit copper mine in Canada, operated by Taseko Mines Limited. It is located just north of Williams Lake and employs many residents.

== Climate ==
Williams Lake has a humid continental climate with warm summers. Spring is the driest time of year, and summer and winter are the wettest seasons respectively. Williams Lake receives about 2,000 hours of bright sunshine per year, which is more than most of the province. It is also located in the rain shadow of the coastal mountains.

The lowest temperature ever recorded in Williams Lake was −42.8 °C (−45 °F) on January 22, 1943, and the highest temperature ever recorded was 41.1 °C (106 °F) on July 16 & 17, 1941. Williams Lake – along with Billings, and nearby McLeese Lake – holds the record for the highest maximum temperature ever recorded in the province during the month of September. This occurred on September 4, 1988.

The Williams Lake Airport weather station is at an elevation of 939.7 m (3,083 ft) while the Williams Lake River weather station is at 585.2 m (1,920 ft), a difference of 354.5 m (1,163 ft). Thus the average temperature is significantly warmer in the city proper than the airport.

Climate data for Williams Lake (Williams Lake River), 1981–2010 normals, extremes 1939–2002 (Note: Extreme high and low temperatures are from the Williams Lake climate station (January 1939 to August 1947), and Williams Lake River (August 1980 to June 2002).)
Month	Jan	Feb	Mar	Apr	May	Jun	Jul	Aug	Sep	Oct	Nov	Dec	Year
Record high °C (°F)	16.0 (60.8)	16.0 (60.8)	22.5 (72.5)	31.7 (89.1)	38.0 (100.4)	37.2 (99.0)	41.1 (106.0)	37.5 (99.5)	39.0 (102.2)	30.0 (86.0)	18.0 (64.4)	17.2 (63.0)	41.1 (106.0)
Mean daily maximum °C (°F)	−1.9 (28.6)	2.6 (36.7)	9.2 (48.6)	14.7 (58.5)	19.7 (67.5)	23.0 (73.4)	25.8 (78.4)	25.9 (78.6)	21.0 (69.8)	12.6 (54.7)	3.5 (38.3)	−2.2 (28.0)	12.8 (55.0)
Daily mean °C (°F)	−5.9 (21.4)	−2.5 (27.5)	2.6 (36.7)	7.3 (45.1)	12.1 (53.8)	15.6 (60.1)	17.9 (64.2)	17.5 (63.5)	13.1 (55.6)	6.7 (44.1)	−0.2 (31.6)	−6.0 (21.2)	6.5 (43.7)
Mean daily minimum °C (°F)	−9.9 (14.2)	−7.5 (18.5)	−4.0 (24.8)	−0.2 (31.6)	4.3 (39.7)	8.1 (46.6)	10.0 (50.0)	9.2 (48.6)	5.2 (41.4)	0.8 (33.4)	−3.9 (25.0)	−9.7 (14.5)	0.2 (32.4)
Record low °C (°F)	−42.8 (−45.0)	−38.3 (−36.9)	−30.0 (−22.0)	−17.8 (0.0)	−5.0 (23.0)	−1.7 (28.9)	2.0 (35.6)	−2.2 (28.0)	−7.0 (19.4)	−25.0 (−13.0)	−37.0 (−34.6)	−41.7 (−43.1)	−42.8 (−45.0)
Average precipitation mm (inches)	31.7 (1.25)	12.9 (0.51)	15.3 (0.60)	20.7 (0.81)	35.6 (1.40)	57.6 (2.27)	60.5 (2.38)	46.6 (1.83)	37.5 (1.48)	36.6 (1.44)	36.7 (1.44)	34.3 (1.35)	425.9 (16.77)
Average rainfall mm (inches)	7.9 (0.31)	3.7 (0.15)	9.6 (0.38)	18.5 (0.73)	35.5 (1.40)	57.6 (2.27)	60.5 (2.38)	46.6 (1.83)	37.4 (1.47)	34.9 (1.37)	19.2 (0.76)	3.9 (0.15)	335.3 (13.20)
Average snowfall cm (inches)	23.8 (9.4)	9.2 (3.6)	5.7 (2.2)	2.2 (0.9)	0.1 (0.0)	0.0 (0.0)	0.0 (0.0)	0.0 (0.0)	0.1 (0.0)	1.7 (0.7)	17.5 (6.9)	30.4 (12.0)	90.6 (35.7)
Average precipitation days (≥ 0.2 mm)	8.4	5.6	6.6	8.4	12.1	15.0	13.6	11.8	9.9	12.5	10.2	9.4	123.4
Average rainy days (≥ 0.2 mm)	2.2	2.2	4.8	7.9	12.1	15.0	13.6	11.8	9.9	12.2	6.6	1.9	100.2
Average snowy days (≥ 0.2 cm)	7.2	3.7	2.2	1.0	0.1	0.0	0.0	0.0	0.1	0.7	4.9	8.1	27.9
Source: Environment Canada

Climate data for Williams Lake Airport, 1981–2010 normals, extremes 1960–present
Month	Jan	Feb	Mar	Apr	May	Jun	Jul	Aug	Sep	Oct	Nov	Dec	Year
Record high humidex	12.2	19.6	18.2	28.0	33.9	41.0	36.2	36.4	35.6	26.8	16.1	10.6	41.0
Record high °C (°F)	12.8 (55.0)	12.8 (55.0)	18.9 (66.0)	28.8 (83.8)	34.5 (94.1)	39.6 (103.3)	34.4 (93.9)	33.8 (92.8)	35.8 (96.4)	27.1 (80.8)	16.7 (62.1)	12.2 (54.0)	39.6 (103.3)
Mean daily maximum °C (°F)	−2.7 (27.1)	0.8 (33.4)	5.8 (42.4)	11.0 (51.8)	16.0 (60.8)	19.5 (67.1)	22.5 (72.5)	22.2 (72.0)	17.2 (63.0)	9.7 (49.5)	1.4 (34.5)	−3.5 (25.7)	10.0 (50.0)
Daily mean °C (°F)	−6.7 (19.9)	−4.1 (24.6)	0.3 (32.5)	4.9 (40.8)	9.6 (49.3)	13.3 (55.9)	16.0 (60.8)	15.3 (59.5)	10.6 (51.1)	4.6 (40.3)	−2.3 (27.9)	−7.3 (18.9)	4.5 (40.1)
Mean daily minimum °C (°F)	−10.7 (12.7)	−8.9 (16.0)	−5.2 (22.6)	−1.3 (29.7)	3.2 (37.8)	7.0 (44.6)	9.3 (48.7)	8.3 (46.9)	4.0 (39.2)	−0.6 (30.9)	−5.9 (21.4)	−11.0 (12.2)	−1.0 (30.2)
Record low °C (°F)	−42.2 (−44.0)	−34.6 (−30.3)	−31.7 (−25.1)	−16.7 (1.9)	−5.8 (21.6)	−4.0 (24.8)	0.0 (32.0)	−1.7 (28.9)	−8.9 (16.0)	−28.6 (−19.5)	−41.6 (−42.9)	−42.8 (−45.0)	−42.8 (−45.0)
Record low wind chill	−46.8	−45.3	−39.9	−21.8	−12.0	−4.1	0.0	−2.8	−11.0	−35.2	−49.6	−52.2	−52.2
Average precipitation mm (inches)	33.1 (1.30)	18.6 (0.73)	17.9 (0.70)	22.2 (0.87)	39.1 (1.54)	58.6 (2.31)	52.7 (2.07)	46.1 (1.81)	41.8 (1.65)	41.0 (1.61)	42.2 (1.66)	37.6 (1.48)	450.7 (17.74)
Average rainfall mm (inches)	4.6 (0.18)	2.0 (0.08)	3.9 (0.15)	13.2 (0.52)	36.0 (1.42)	58.3 (2.30)	52.7 (2.07)	46.1 (1.81)	41.2 (1.62)	32.6 (1.28)	14.2 (0.56)	2.9 (0.11)	307.6 (12.11)
Average snowfall cm (inches)	36.9 (14.5)	21.1 (8.3)	17.5 (6.9)	10.2 (4.0)	3.3 (1.3)	0.3 (0.1)	0.0 (0.0)	0.0 (0.0)	0.6 (0.2)	9.4 (3.7)	33.0 (13.0)	44.5 (17.5)	176.8 (69.6)
Average precipitation days (≥ 0.2 mm)	12.0	8.7	8.7	9.1	12.6	14.8	13.1	10.8	10.5	11.9	12.5	12.8	137.4
Average rainy days (≥ 0.2 mm)	1.8	1.4	2.7	6.2	12.0	14.8	13.0	10.8	10.5	10.2	4.6	1.5	89.4
Average snowy days (≥ 0.2 cm)	11.1	8.0	6.8	4.4	1.8	0.1	0.1	0.0	0.0	3.4	9.7	12.3	58.0
Average relative humidity (%)	75.1	62.1	47.2	41.0	40.8	44.0	41.6	41.1	45.6	56.7	72.8	77.4	53.8
Mean monthly sunshine hours	58.6	97.4	154.6	198.0	248.8	242.4	283.5	273.4	199.2	123.8	60.3	45.8	1,985.8
Percentage possible sunshine	22.8	34.9	42.1	47.5	51.2	48.5	56.3	60.1	52.3	37.4	22.8	18.9	41.2
Source: Environment Canada

== Demographics ==
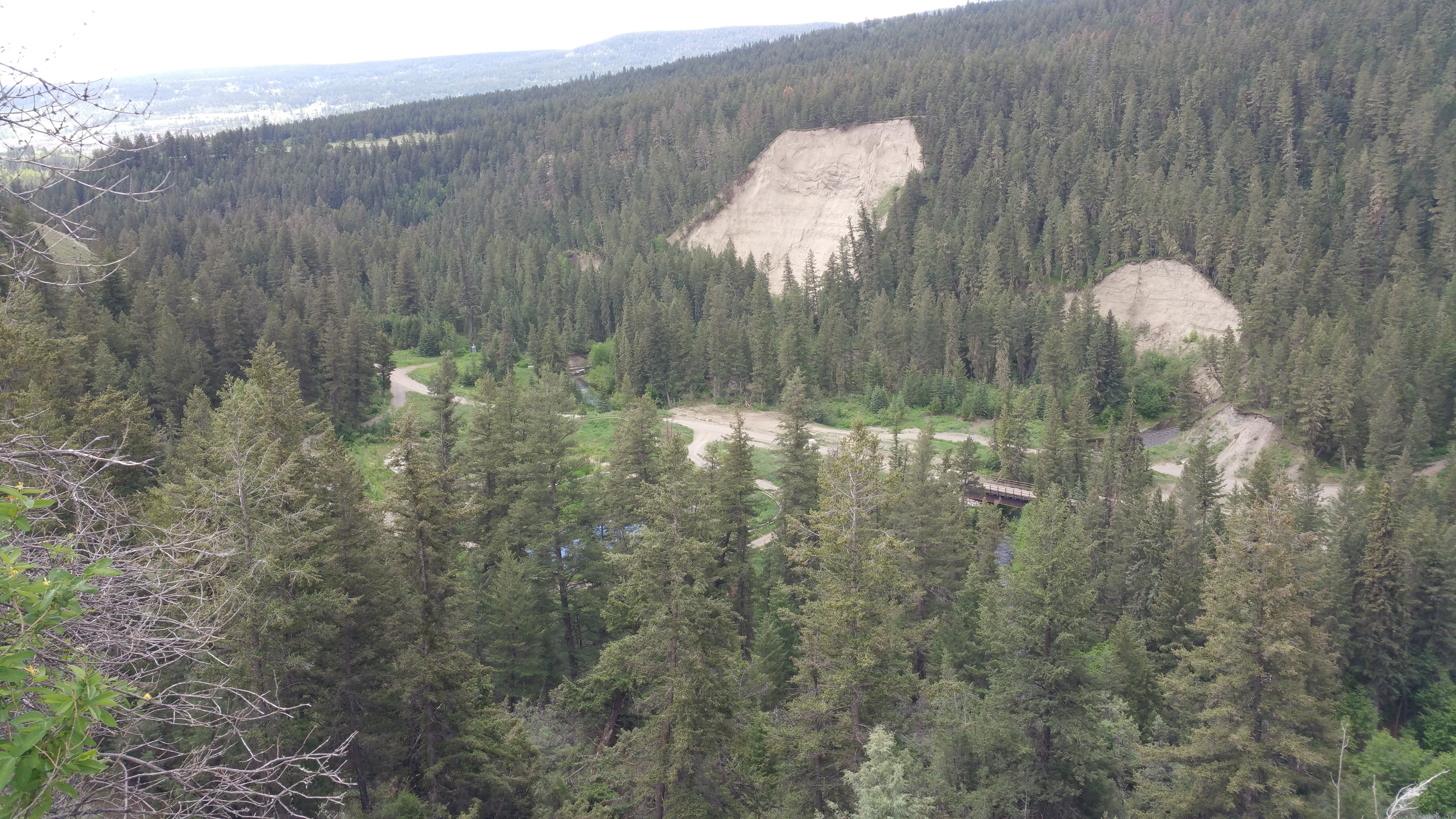
A trail through the Williams Lake river valley

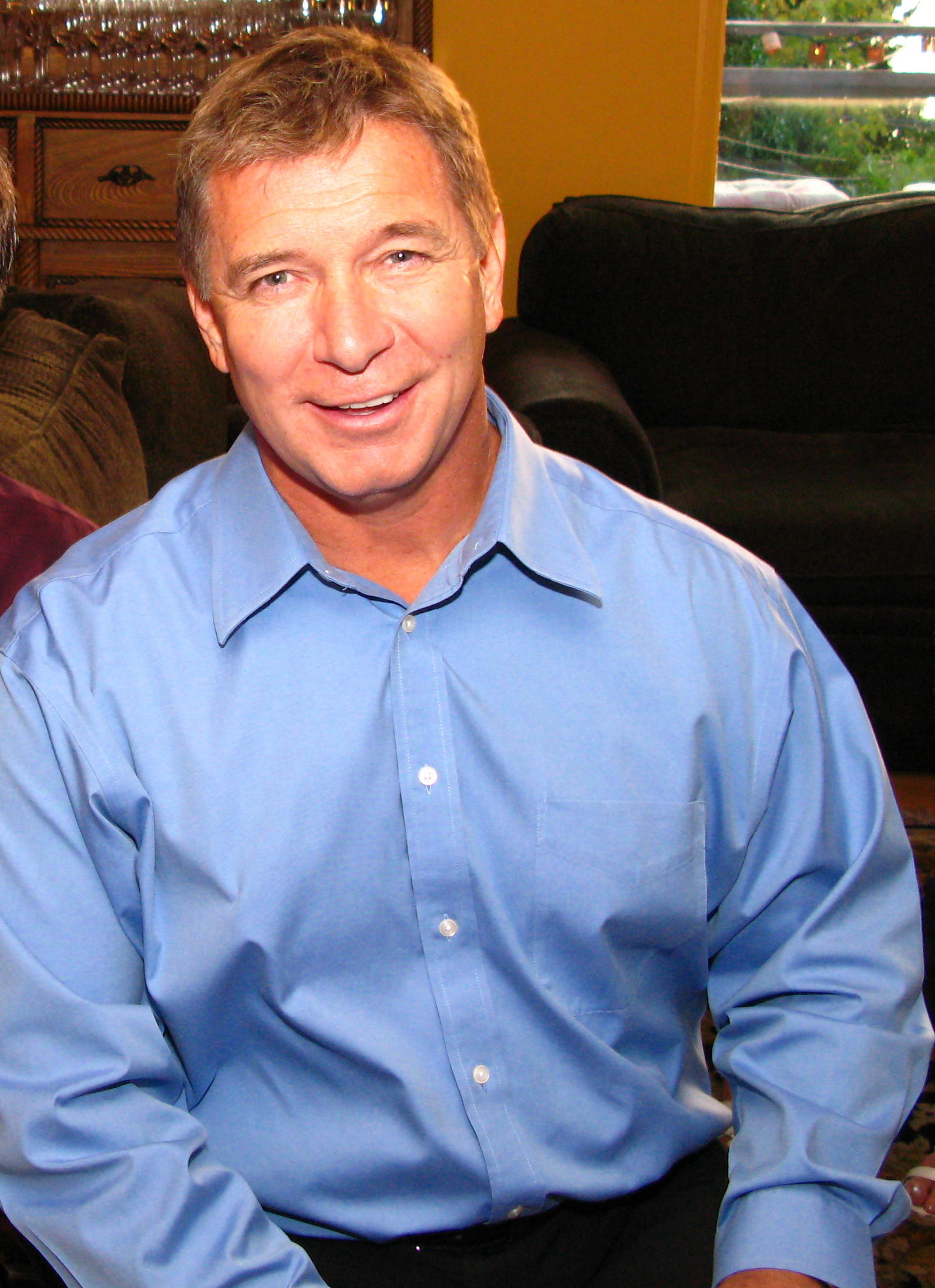
Rick Hansen, pictured here in 2008, grew up in Williams Lake

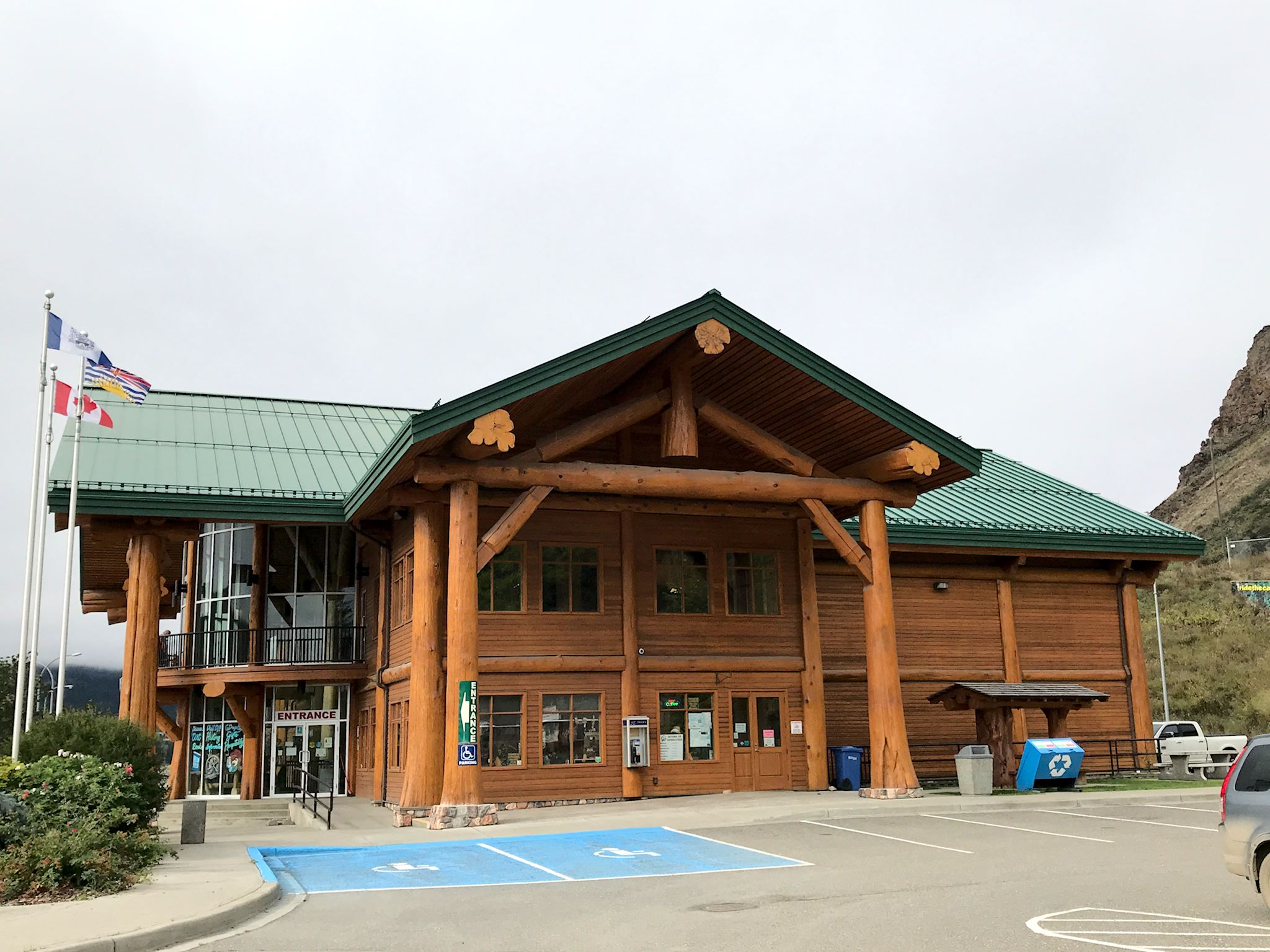
Williams Lake Visitor Centre

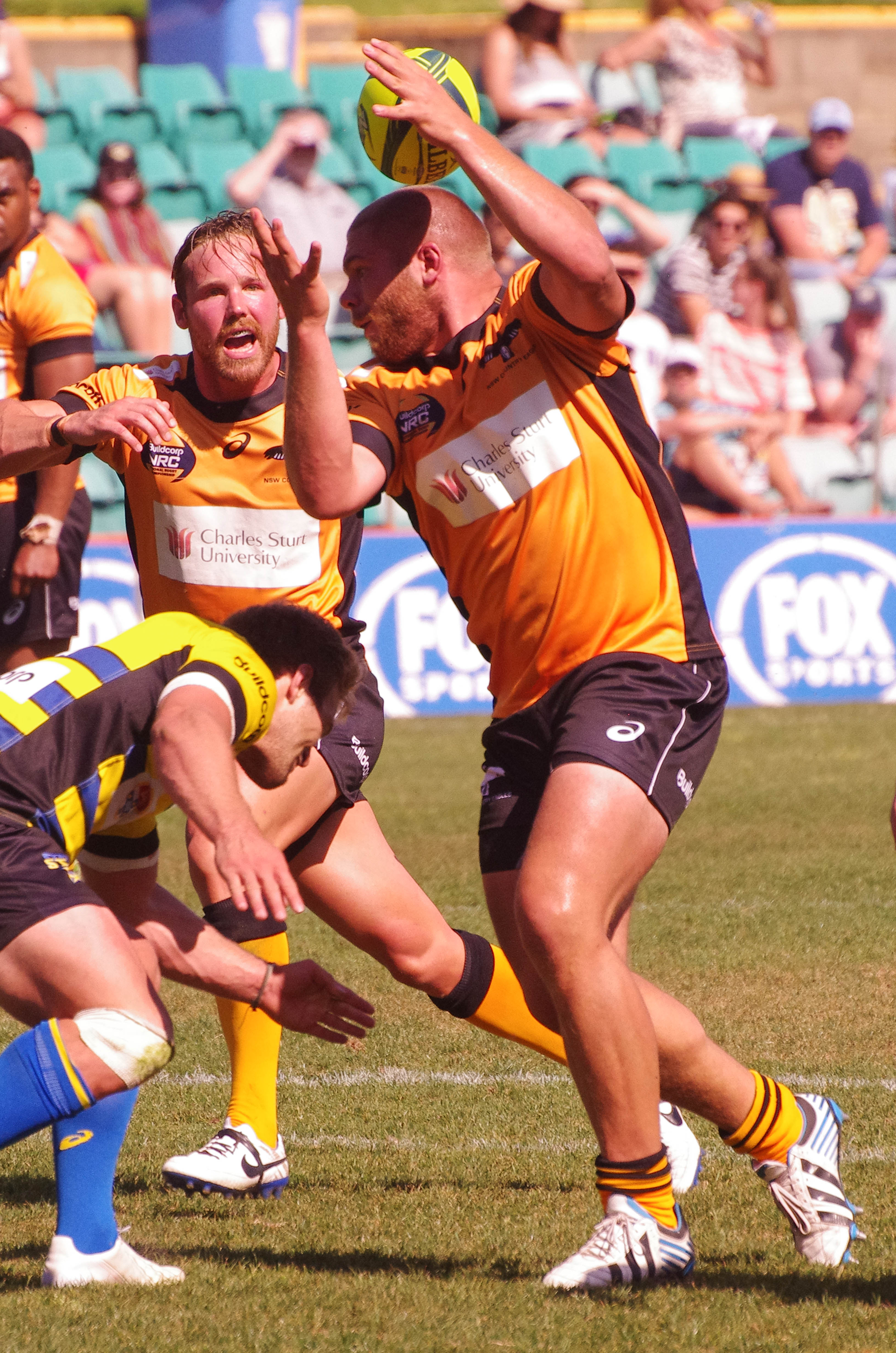
Rugby player, Jake Ilnicki, was born in Williams Lake

In the 2021 Canadian census conducted by Statistics Canada, Williams Lake had a population of 23,608 living in 4,736 of its 5,066 total private dwellings, a change of 1.8% from its 2016 population of 10,753. With a land area of 33.12 km^{2} (12.79 sq mi), it had a population density of 330.5/km^{2} in 2021. According to the same census, Williams Lake had a census agglomeration population of 23,608.

=== Ethnicity ===
Below is the ethnic origin of people from the Williams Lake census agglomeration, as of the 2006 Canadian census. Note that percentages total more than 100% due to multiple responses e.g. German-East Indian, Norwegian-Irish-Polish.

Ethnic origin	Population	Percent of 18,615
English	5,870	31.5%
Irish	3,380	18.2%
Scottish	4,520	24.3%
Welsh	480	2.6%
misc. British Isles, n.i.e.	260	1.4%
French	2,330	12.5%
Métis	640	3.4%
North American Indian	2,740	14.7%
American	490	2.6%
Canadian	4,850	26.1%
Jamaican	20	0.1%
Brazilian	10	0.1%
Mexican	90	0.5%
Austrian	210	1.1%
Belgian	65	0.3%
Dutch (Netherlands)	1,120	6.0%
Flemish	10	0.1%
German	3,725	20.0%
Swiss	215	1.2%
Finnish	150	0.8%
Danish	230	1.2%
Iceland	90	0.5%
Norwegian	830	4.5%
Swedish	695	3.7%
misc. Scandinavian, n.i.e.	85	0.5%
Lithuanian	15	0.1%
Czech	120	0.6%
Czech/Slovak	40	0.2%
Slovak	25	0.1%
Hungarian (Magyar)	260	1.4%
Polish	590	3.2%
Romanian	110	0.6%
Russian	485	2.6%
Ukrainian	980	5.3%
Croatian	20	0.1%
Greek	45	0.2%
Italian	465	2.5%
Portuguese	30	0.2%
Spanish	115	0.6%
Yugoslav, n.i.e.	70	0.4%
Basque	20	0.1%
Gypsy (Roma)	10	0.1%
Jewish	65	0.3%
misc. European, n.i.e.	30	0.2%
Black	25	0.1%
Ghanaian	10	0.1%
South African	50	0.3%
misc. African, n.i.e.	10	0.1%
Lebanese	10	0.1%
Maghrebi origins	15	0.1%
Maghrebi, n.i.e.	15	0.1%
misc. Arab, n.i.e.	10	0.1%
East Indian	625	3.4%
Gujarati	20	0.1%
Punjabi	105	0.6%
misc. South Asian, n.i.e.	25	0.1%
Chinese	150	0.8%
Filipino	25	0.1%
Indonesian	10	0.1%
Japanese	75	0.4%
Korean	10	0.1%
Malaysian	50	0.3%
Australians	35	0.2%
New Zealander	15	0.1%

In the thirty-year period between 1986 and 2016, the population of Williams Lake has been largely stable, growing slightly from 10,280 to 10,753.

Panethnic groups in the City of Williams Lake (1986−2021)
Panethnic group	2021		2016		2011		2006		2001		1996		1991		1986	
Panethnic group	Pop.	%	Pop.	%	Pop.	%	Pop.	%	Pop.	%	Pop.	%	Pop.	%	Pop.	%
European (Note: Statistic includes all persons that did not make up part of a visible minority or an indigenous identity.)	7,140	66.67%	7,535	72.98%	7,655	72.18%	8,240	77.74%	8,385	76.44%	8,170	78.94%	7,990	77.8%	7,720	76.28%
Indigenous	2,615	24.42%	2,045	19.81%	2,120	19.99%	1,435	13.54%	1,445	13.17%	915	8.84%	1,060	10.32%	1,050	10.38%
South Asian	425	3.97%	405	3.92%	395	3.72%	700	6.6%	925	8.43%	1,015	9.81%	1,035	10.08%	1,165	11.51%
Southeast Asian (Note: Statistic includes total responses of "Filipino" and "Southeast Asian" under visible minority section on census.)	195	1.82%	100	0.97%	65	0.61%	30	0.28%	45	0.41%	20	0.19%	35	0.34%	—N/a	—N/a
East Asian (Note: Statistic includes total responses of "Chinese", "Korean", and "Japanese" under visible minority section on census.)	175	1.63%	110	1.07%	355	3.35%	140	1.32%	115	1.05%	180	1.74%	130	1.27%	175	1.73%
Other/multiracial (Note: Statistic includes total responses of "Visible minority, n.i.e." and "Multiple visible minorities" under visible minority section on census.)	150	1.4%	125	1.21%	0	0%	55	0.52%	70	0.64%	50	0.48%	20	0.19%	10	0.1%
Total responses	10,710	97.84%	10,325	96.02%	10,605	97.9%	10,600	98.66%	10,970	98.36%	10,350	98.83%	10,270	98.89%	10,120	98.44%
Total population	10,947	100%	10,753	100%	10,832	100%	10,744	100%	11,153	100%	10,472	100%	10,385	100%	10,280	100%
Note: Totals greater than 100% due to multiple origin responses

=== Religion ===
Religious groups in the City of Williams Lake (1981–2021)
Religious group	2021		2011		2001		1991		1981 (Note: Note: 1981 census religious breakdown for all subdivisions and census agglomerations includes an "Eastern Non-Christian" section. Estimates derived using the Sikh, Hindu, Buddhist, and Muslim proportions of Eastern Non-Christian religious total from the 1991 census.)	
Religious group	Pop.	%	Pop.	%	Pop.	%	Pop.	%	Pop.	%
Irreligion	6,475	60.46%	5,165	48.7%	3,535	32.22%	3,210	31.26%	1,470	17.86%
Christianity	3,655	34.13%	4,950	46.68%	6,385	58.2%	5,905	57.5%	5,890	71.57%
Sikhism	320	2.99%	370	3.49%	840	7.66%	1,035	10.08%	850	10.33%
Hinduism	45	0.42%	10	0.09%	10	0.09%	0	0%	0	0%
Indigenous Spirituality	40	0.37%	40	0.38%	N/A	N/A	N/A	N/A	N/A	N/A
Buddhism	25	0.23%	25	0.24%	15	0.14%	10	0.1%	10	0.12%
Islam	25	0.23%	0	0%	40	0.36%	0	0%	0	0%
Judaism	15	0.14%	0	0%	0	0%	0	0%	0	0%
Other	105	0.98%	55	0.52%	135	1.23%	105	1.02%	0	0%
Total responses	10,710	97.84%	10,605	97.9%	10,970	98.36%	10,270	98.89%	8,230	98.42%
Total population	10,947	100%	10,832	100%	11,153	100%	10,385	100%	8,362	100%

== Education ==
Williams Lake is served by Cariboo-Chilcotin School District 27. It has five public elementary schools teaching up to grade 6 and three StrongStart BC centres. These are Cataline Elementary (Cataline Strong Start Centre), Chilcotin Road Elementary, Marie Sharpe Elementary (Marie Sharpe StrongStart Centre), Mountview Elementary (Mountview StrongStart Centre), Nesika Elementary. There is also SD 27 OR#1 Wildwood, a StrongStart Outreach Centre. One secondary school, Lake City Secondary School, which was formed by a merger of Columneetza Secondary School and Williams Lake Secondary School in 2013, teaches grade 7 to 12 students. Alternative education provision is met by the Graduation Routes Other Ways (GROW) centre and the Skyline Alternate School program. The GROW Centre offers grades 10–12 for adults. Anne Stevenson Secondary School was closed in 2003 due to falling numbers of students.

There are three independent schools in Williams Lake: Sacred Heart Catholic School (K-7), Maranatha Christian School (K-10) and Cariboo Adventist Academy (K-12).

=== Colleges and universities ===
Thompson Rivers University has a campus in Williams Lake and offers a wide variety of programs and courses including university transfers, certificate and diploma programs, health and safety certification, trades and technology, and university and career preparation. The Cariboo Chilcotin Elder College is a local affiliate of Thompson Rivers University that offers programs and opportunities for people who are 50 years of age and older and interested in participating in the programs, courses and special events run by the college.

TRU decided in 2026 to shut down the university, stating there's not enough enrollment to justify it remaining open.

== Sports and recreation ==
- The Williams Lake Stampeders are the local ice hockey team, playing in the Central Interior Hockey League; their arena is the Cariboo Memorial Complex
- The Williams Lake TimberWolves resumed play in September 2009 in the British Columbia Hockey League (BCHL). Due to financial obligations, the BCHL has suspended the Williams Lake franchise indefinitely.
- Williams Lake Golf and Tennis Club situated on the south side of town is home to a championship 18 hole course and full size tennis courts.
- Thunder Mountain Speedway – Thunder Mountain speedway is located on Bond Lake Road across from the SPCA. It is a 3/8 mile, paved, banked oval. The track is 50 feet wide, is banked 12 degrees on corners, 3.5 degrees on the straights and is shaped to provide a longer straight away between turns 3 & 4 than between turns 1 & 2.

== Government ==
=== Local ===
Williams Lake is an incorporated municipality, with representation provided through the Williams Lake City Hall. Its mayor is Surinderpal Rathor, who has served in this role since 2022. The city council consists of seven elected positions: the mayor and six council members. The council member serve 4-year terms.

- Mayor: Surinderpal Rathor
- Councillor: Sheila Boehm
- Councillor: Angie Delainey
- Councillor: Joan Flaspohler
- Councillor: Jazmyn Lyons
- Councillor: Michael Moses
- Councillor: Scott Nelson

=== Provincial ===
Williams Lake is located within the Cariboo-Chilcotin electoral district of the British Columbia Legislative Assembly. The riding is represented by Conservative MLA Lorne Doerkson since 2020.

=== Federal ===
Williams Lake lies within the Canadian parliamentary riding of Cariboo—Prince George, and is currently represented by Conservative MP Todd Doherty since 2015.

== Transportation ==
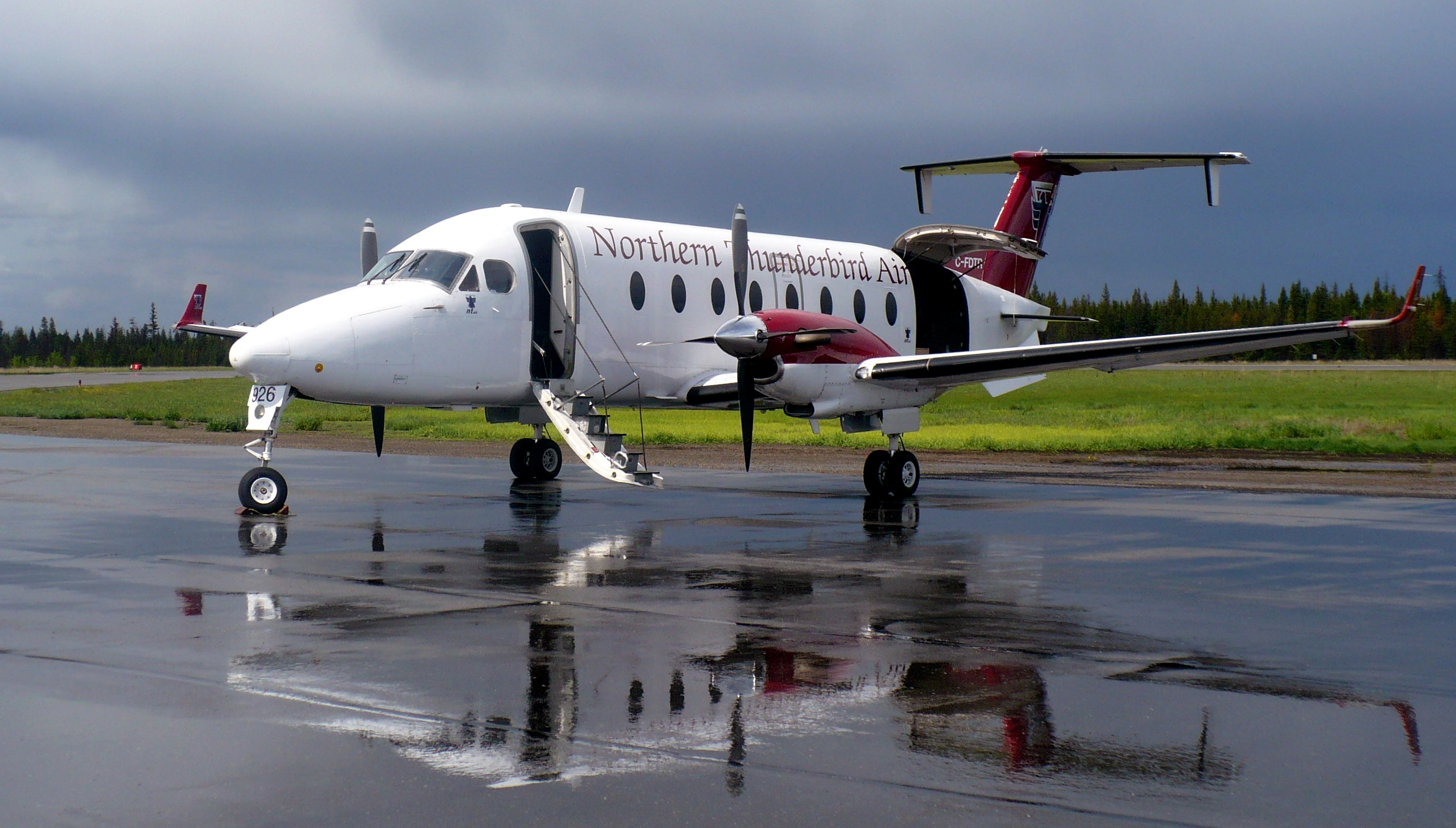
Beechcraft 1900 of Northern Thunderbird Air at Williams Lake Airport

- Williams Lake is located on the junction of Highway 97 and Highway 20.
- Canadian National Railway offers freight service north to Prince George
- Local public transportation consists of the BC Transit and HandyDART bus service.
- Town Taxi and Williams Lake Taxi are two local cab companies in the city.
- Car Rental at Airport - KarRent | Self Drive.
- Ebus offers round trip scheduled bus service to Kamloops, Prince George, and Surrey BC.

The Williams Lake Airport is located 4.2 nautical miles (7.8 km; 4.8 mi) northeast of the city. It was opened in 1956 by Transport Canada and on January 1, 1997, the ownership of the airport was transferred to the City of Williams Lake. The airport is served by Pacific Coastal Airlines, and Central Mountain Air with daily flights to Vancouver. There was a small seaplane base at Williams Lake Water Aerodrome but it is no longer in operation.

== Local attractions ==
=== Williams Lake Stampede ===
Held annually, on the Canada Day long weekend, the Williams Lake Stampede features Canadian Professional Rodeo Association action including bull riding, barrel racing, Bareback riding, tie-down roping, steer wrestling, team roping and chuckwagon races. The Williams Lake Stampede plays host to many top cowboys and international rodeo competitors from Canada and the United States, most of which continue on the circuit to the Calgary Stampede, the following weekend.

The Stampede festivities also include a parade of floats from local organizations, such as 4-H groups, Native/Aboriginal bands, community service groups, the stampede royalty and local merchants. There is also a carnival with rides and games located near the stampede grounds.

=== Scout Island ===
Scout Island, which is 9.69 ha (23.9 acres) in size, is both a park and a nature area. It consists of a beach, picnic area, boat launch and several trails through mainly natural environment. Scout Island is actually two islands that are connected to the west end of Williams Lake by a causeway.

Located on the island is the Nature House, which provides a view of the marsh next to the island. It is run by the Williams Lake Field Naturalists and provides information, displays and programs dealing with the local environment.

The island is leased to Williams Lake by the owners, the Nature Trust of British Columbia.

== Media ==
=== Television ===
- Shaw TV – local Community Access Channel (only available on Shaw Cable)

=== Radio ===
- AM 570 – CKWL, Country, "Country 570" formerly "The Wolf"
- FM 97.5 – CFFM-FM, Rock, "The GOAT," formerly "The Rush" and earlier "The Max".
- "The Goat" and "Country 570" are owned by Vista Radio and use www.MyCaribooNow.com website
- FM 92.1 – CBYK, CBC Radio One
- FM 94.3 – CISK Sikh Radio
- FM 95.1 – VOAR Christian Radio (broadcasting from Newfoundland)
- FM 96.1 – VF2235, First Nations community radio, "Canadian First Nations Radio or CFNR"
- FM 100.7 – CJLJ-FM, community radio

==== Other radio services ====
There was a Loran-C station at Williams Lake.

=== Publications ===
- Williams Lake Tribune (owned by Black Press)
- Cariboo Advisor (owned by Black Press)
- Welcome to Williams Lake local news site

== Notable people ==
- Don Alder - finger style guitarist
- Ian Billcliff - Canadian cricketer
- Ed Crombie - American racing driver
- Todd Doherty - Conservative Party of Canada MP for Cariboo-Prince George.
- Rick Hansen – athlete and disabilities activist
- Jake Ilnicki – rugby player
- Roberto McLellan – professional boxer
- Kayla Moleschi – rugby player, Olympian
- Carey Price – hockey player
- Amrik Virk – politician, government official
- Phyllis Webstad – creator of Orange Shirt Day
- Matt Weingart – former rugby player and co-founder of Dryworld
- Lorne Doerkson - Premier of British Columbia

== Bibliography ==
- Cariboo-Chilcotin Pioneer People and Places Irene Stangoe ISBN 1-895811-12-0
