= Peter Skene Ogden Secondary School =

Peter Skene Ogden Secondary

Location
- 200 Seventh Street, Box 910; 100 Mile House, British Columbia, V0K 2E0; Canada
- Coordinates: 51.6373°N 121.3017°W

Information
- School type: Public, high school
- School board: School District 27 Cariboo-Chilcotin
- School number: 2727056
- Principal: Caitlin Currie
- Staff: 36
- Grades: 8-12
- Enrollment: 456 (September 30, 2011)
- Colours: Green, Black and White
- Team name: Eagles
- Website: https://www.sd27.bc.ca/pso

Peter Skene Ogden Secondary is a public high school in 100 Mile House in the Canadian province of British Columbia. The school is administered as part of School District 27 Cariboo-Chilcotin. It is a grade 8 to 12 facility enrolling approximately 565 students. The principal is Caitlin Currie.

The school offers regular classroom instruction in a semesterized timetable, as well as independent directed studies such as a First Nations Tutorial program, through a SMARTT electronic and self-paced delivery support program. The school also provides a Learning and Behavioral Support Alternate Program and a Learning and Lifestyle Support off campus Storefront Program. In addition to this, it also offers a French Immersion program for students who have completed the program through to grade 7.

It offers elective classes such as Food Studies, Outdoor Education, Art, Woodwork, Metalwork, and Computer Science, among others. Besides this, there are curricular classes such as Math, English, Science, and Social Studies. It also has a popular band program.

The school offers several after-school activities. These include specialized bands such as jazz band, senior band, and tour band, sports such as soccer, track, volleyball, rugby, and basketball, and a drama program. Clubs include a Gay-Straight Alliance, an Amnesty Club, and a Gaming Club.

== Notable former pupils ==
- Michaela Pereira, co-anchor of New Day, the main weekday breakfast show on CNN
- Lochlyn Munro, actor
- Scott Fitzgerald Gray, writer and game designer
