= CISK-FM =

Canadian radio station

Coordinates: 52.1487°N 122.1609°W

CISK-FM is a Canadian radio station, which broadcasts Punjabi language programming at 94.3 MHz/FM, serving the Punjabi diaspora residing in Williams Lake, British Columbia. The station is owned by the Western Singh Sabha Association, which received approval from the CRTC on June 9, 2004. The station operates at 94.3 MHz with an effective radiated power of 35 watts.
