= Ospika Airport =

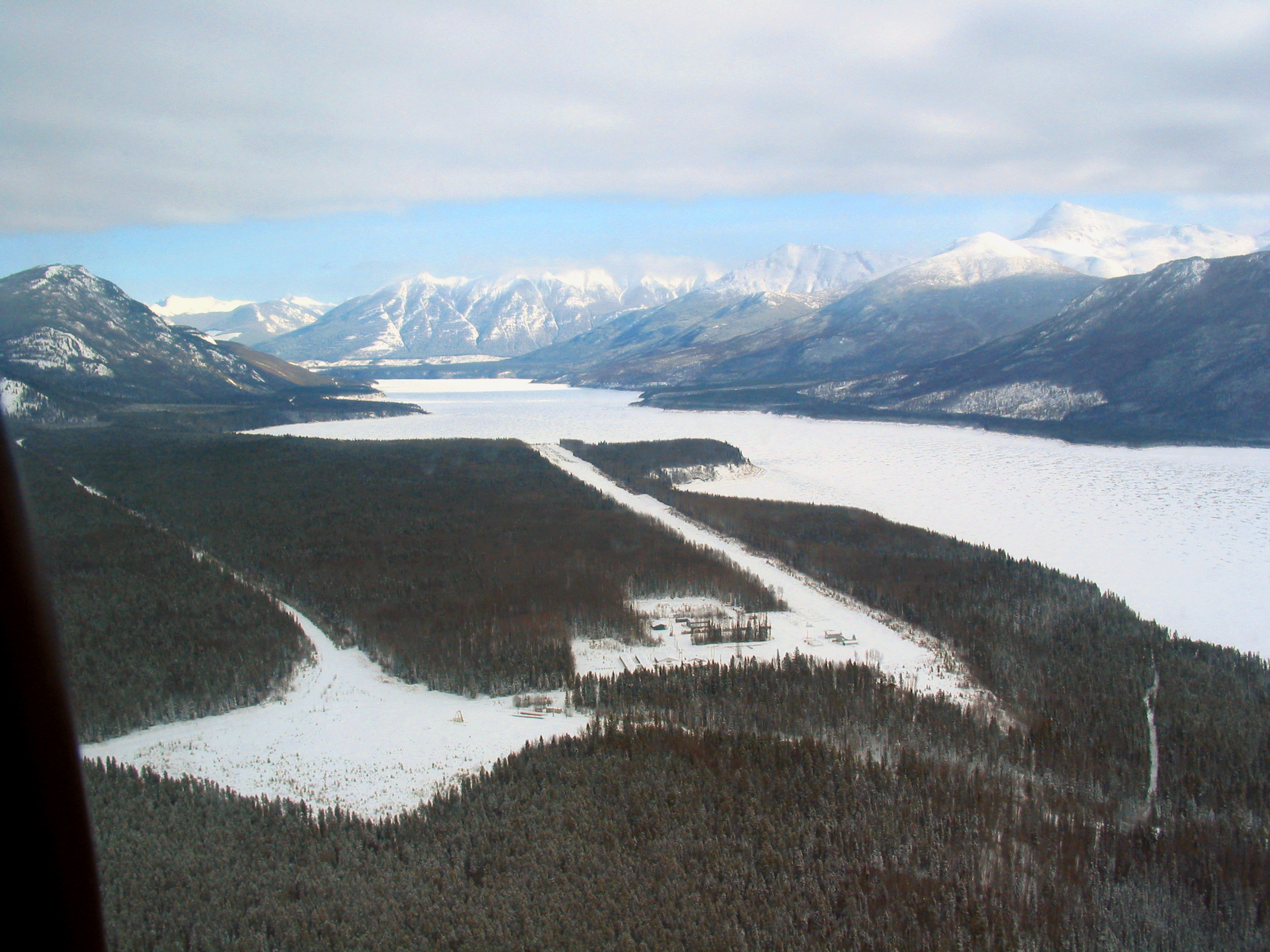
- IATA: none; ICAO: none; TC LID: CBA9

Summary
- Airport type: Public
- Operator: Finlay River Outfitters Ltd.
- Location: Ospika, British Columbia
- Time zone: PST (UTC−08:00)
  - Summer (DST): PDT (UTC−07:00)
- Elevation AMSL: 2,353 ft / 717 m
- Coordinates: 56°16′15″N 124°03′50″W

Map
- Location in British Columbia CBA9 (Canada)

Runways
Direction	Length		Surface
Direction	ft	m	Surface
03/21	5,886	1,794	Coarse gravel
- Source: Canada Flight Supplement

Ospika Airport (TC LID: CBA9) is located adjacent to Ospika, on Williston Lake, in British Columbia, Canada.

== Airlines and destinations ==
Airlines	Destinations
Northern Thunderbird Air	Prince George
