= Columneetza Secondary School =

Columneetza Junior Secondary

Location
- 1045 Western Ave; Williams Lake, British Columbia, V2G 2J8; Canada; 52.14595°N 122.15081°W

Information
- School type: Public, Middle school
- Founded: 1967
- School board: School District 27 Cariboo-Chilcotin
- School number: 2727047
- Principal: Holly Zurak
- Grades: 7–9
- Enrollment: 695 (2025/2026)
- Language: English, French, Chilcotin and Shuswap
- Colours: Grey and burgundy/black
- Mascot: Jimmy Falcon
- Team name: Falcons
- Highest enrollment: 1200+ (2005–2007)
- Website: https://cjs.sd27.bc.ca/

Columneetza Junior Secondary is a public Middle school in Williams Lake in the Canadian province of British Columbia. The school is administered as part of School District 27 Cariboo-Chilcotin. It is a grade 7–9 facility enrolling approximately 750 students. The principal is Ms. Holly Zurak.

The school offers regular classroom instruction in a semesterized timetable. In addition, it also offers a French Immersion for students who have completed the program through to grade 7.

It offers elective classes such as Aquatics, Art, Auto Shop, Computer Science, Food Studies, Hockey, Metalwork, and Woodwork, among others. Besides this, there are curricular classes such as Math, English, Science, and Social Studies. It also has a popular band program.

== Notable alumni ==
Rick Hansen – Paralympian, wheelchair racer, humanitarian
