= Williams Lake Secondary School =

Lake City Secondary

Location
- 640 Carson Drive; Williams Lake, British Columbia, V2G 1T3; Canada
- Coordinates: 52.13638°N 122.14036°W

Information
- School type: Public, high school
- School board: School District 27 Cariboo-Chilcotin
- School number: 2727069
- Principal: Mr. Curt Levens
- Staff: 48
- Grades: 10–12
- Enrollment: 780 (September 30, 2023)
- Language: English
- Colours: Burgunday and black
- Mascot: Jimmy Falcon
- Team name: Lake City Falcons
- Website: https://lcs.sd27.bc.ca/

Williams Lake Secondary School was a public high school in Williams Lake in the Canadian province of British Columbia. The school was administered as part of School District 27 Cariboo-Chilcotin. It was a grade 8 to 12 facility enrolling approximately 606 students. The principal was Sylvia Debray.

Before 1999 the school, which is often called "WL" or "WLSS", only included grades 8–10 and was known as Williams Lake Junior Secondary.

In June 2013 it was changed to Lake City Secondary includes grades 10–12. Principal is Curt Levens.

Alumni

Carey Price – Professional Hockey Player
