= Michaela Pereira =

Canadian television personality (born 1970)

- Born: August 26, 1970 (age 56); Saskatoon, Saskatchewan, Canada
- Education: University of Victoria, British Columbia
- Occupation: News anchor
- Employer(s): KTTV (2020–2022); HLN (2016–2018); CNN (2013–2016); KTLA (2004–2013); ZDTV/TechTV (1998–2004)
- Awards: 3 Golden Mic Awards; 2 Emmy Awards; 2 Mark Twain Awards

Michaela Pereira (born August 26, 1970) is a Canadian television personality best known as being a former anchor for KTLA in Los Angeles and for the KTTV FOX11 Los Angeles morning show, Good Day LA.

She announced on March 28, 2013, that she would be leaving KTLA in May to be a part of the CNN morning show New Day that debuted on June 17, 2013.

In 2016 Pereira left CNN for the HLN cable television network, where on July 11, 2016, she debuted as anchor of the Los Angeles-based news program MichaeLA.

In October 2018 HLN announced that Pereira and the hosts of two other HLN live news shows would be let go by the network; the final broadcasts for MichaeLA and the other two shows took place on October 26, 2018.

It was announced in September 2020 that Pereira would join KTTV in October of that year. She announced on August 25, 2022, that she would be leaving Good Day LA; her last day was September 9. In November 2025, Sinclair, Inc. announced Pereira as the Executive Producer of Amazing America, the company's digital brand focused on history, heritage, and culture.

== Education ==
Pereira was educated at Peter Skene Ogden Secondary School, a public high school in the Cariboo town of 100 Mile House, British Columbia, from which she graduated in 1988, followed by Camosun College and the University of Victoria, also in British Columbia.

== Life and career ==
Pereira began her career at CHEK-TV in Victoria, British Columbia, as host of a magazine show and documentary special. She also reported on weather, sports and entertainment.

She later co-hosted Internet Tonight on ZDTV with Scott Herriott, a daily look at Internet news and informative, interesting, and funny websites. After Internet Tonight's cancellation in 2001, Pereira became a regular host for TechLive, serving in that position until 2004, when she signed on to KTLA in Los Angeles. She hosted her last episode of TechLive on February 6, 2004, after which TechTV began the process of merging with G4 in the next month, leading to its demise.

In 1999, she was one of many personalities who temporarily co-reviewed films with film critic Roger Ebert on his television program in place of Gene Siskel. She was a finalist to replace Siskel, but lost the position to Richard Roeper. In one installment of the series, she discussed how her tastes leaned toward the mainstream and his toward the arthouse environment, and also reported on the increasing use of the Internet to market major films.

On January 1, 2007, Pereira co-hosted coverage of the Tournament of Roses Parade with former game show host Bob Eubanks, replacing Stephanie Edwards. Pereira co-hosted the parade coverage with Eubanks again in 2008.

On March 28, 2013, it was announced that Pereira would be leaving KTLA to become a host of a new morning show at CNN. She returned to Los Angeles in 2016 to anchor the live news program MichaeLA on HLN.

In October 2018, HLN announced that Pereira's employment with the network was ending, along with that of Ashleigh Banfield and Carol Costello, based on the network's decision to scale back its live news programming. The final broadcast of Pereira's show (as well as the shows hosted by Banfield and Costello) took place on October 26, 2018.

Pereira launched her new career at KTTV (channel 11) starting October 2020.

Pereira served as the co-host of KTLA Morning News, Los Angeles' number one rated morning newscast, for nine years. The program won nine Emmy Awards, including one for "Best Regularly Scheduled Daily News". Pereira won three Radio & TV News Association Golden Mike Awards: in 2006 for live coverage of a news story, "Urban Farm Eviction," and the Best Daytime News Broadcast in both 2004 and 2006. She was also honored with two Mark Twain Awards in 2004 for "Best Live Coverage of a News Event, Hostage Standoff Mexican Consulate," and the "Best 60 Minute Broadcast: KTLA Morning News."

She is chairwoman of the board of LA's BEST Friends, an after school education, enrichment and recreation program. She served as a member of the board of directors for the Long Beach Boys and Girls Club; an advisory board member of Court Appointed Special Advocates (CASA), supporting children in foster care; an advisory board member of EmpowerTech, serving people with disabilities; and co-chair of the advisory board of Optimist Youth Home, providing services for troubled youth.

Pereira is a member of the National Association of Black Journalists, the Black Journalists Association of Southern California, and American Women in Radio and Television. She is also active with the National Association for the Advancement of Colored People (NAACP).

== Personal life ==
Pereira was adopted. Her parents and siblings do not share the same ethnic backgrounds, which has subsequently led her to be a strong advocate for the rights of children. Though she's lived and worked in the United States for several years she still maintains her Canadian citizenship. She speaks Portuguese, in addition to English, and was an avid snowboarder until a 2010 knee surgery.
