= CJLJ-FM =

Radio station in British Columbia, Canada

Coordinates: 52°06′32″N 121°59′35″W

CJLJ-FM is a Canadian radio station which broadcasts a community radio programming on the frequency of 100.7 MHz (FM) in Williams Lake, British Columbia.

== History ==
On April 28, 2011, Sugar Cane Community Diversity Association received Canadian Radio-television and Telecommunications Commission (CRTC) approval to operate a new FM radio station at 100.7 MHz in Williams Lake, British Columbia.

On April 1, 2012, the station signed on the air as Sugar Cane FM.

On May 3, 2016, the CRTC approved Sugar Cane Community Diversity Association's application to operate a very low-power, English-language Type B Native FM radio station in Williams Lake, British Columbia. The station will operate on the frequency of 100.7 MHz (channel 264VLP) with an effective radiated power of 5 watts (effective height of antenna above average terrain of -68.8 metres).
