= Skyline Alternate School =

Coordinates: 52.1335°N 122.1455°W

Location
- 320 North 2nd Avenue; Williams Lake, British Columbia, V2G 1Z7; Canada

Information
- School type: Public, high school
- School board: School District 27 Cariboo-Chilcotin
- School number: 2799094
- Principal: Heather Auger
- Staff: 3
- Grades: 1–12
- Enrollment: 140 (30 September 2011)
- Website: https://www.sd27.bc.ca/GROWSKY

Skyline Alternate School is a public alternate high school program in Williams Lake in the Canadian province of British Columbia. The school is administered as part of School District 27 Cariboo-Chilcotin. The principal is Heather Auger.

The Skyline program provides an alternative education intervention provision for more vulnerable students. This includes a secondary transition program for students in grades 8 to 12.
