= Roberto McLellan =

Canadian boxer

Personal information
- Nationality: (Canada)
- Born: October 5, 1984 (age 41) Williams Lake, British Columbia, Canada
- Weight: 160 lb (73 kg)

Boxing career
- Weight class: Middleweight
- Stance: Boxer/Puncher

Boxing record
- Total fights: 9
- Wins: 6
- Win by KO: 3
- Losses: 2
- Draws: 1
- No contests: 0

Roberto McLellan (born October 5, 1984), is a Canadian former professional boxer in the Middleweight division and is the former Canadian Professional Boxing Council - Light Middleweight Champion.

== Professional boxing record ==
6 Wins (3 knockouts), 2 Losses, 1 Draw
Res.	Record	Opponent	Type	Rd., Time	Date	Location	Notes
Loss	25-7-4	(Canada) Fitz Vanderpool	UD	10	March 2, 2013	(Canada) Moncton New Brunswick, Moncton Lions Club	National Boxing Authority - Middleweight Title
Win	8-6-2	(Canada) Anthony Lessard	KO	6 (3:00)	March 10, 2011	(Canada) Calgary Alberta, Hyatt Regency Hotel	Canadian Professional Boxing Council - Light Middleweight Title
Loss	2-0-0	(Canada) Janks Trotter	TKO	1 (0:50)	September 17, 2010	(Canada) Calgary Alberta, Subway Soccer Centre	
Win	Debut	(Canada) Darcy Boizard	TKO	3 (1:18)	May 15, 2010	(Canada) Calgary Alberta, Bowness Sports Plex	
Win	3-11-1	(Canada) Stephane Chartrand	TKO	1 (1:48)	August 7, 2009	(Canada) Prince George British Columbia, Roll-A-Dome	
Win	7-3-2	(Canada) Codey Hanna	UD	5	May 2, 2009	(Canada) Williams Lake British Columbia, Elks Hall	
Draw	2-0-0	(Canada) Aubrey Morrow	UD	4	December 27, 2008	(Canada) Coquitlam British Columbia, Red Robinson Show Theatre	
Win	1-4-2	(Canada) Jean Charlemagne	UD	4	June 28, 2008	(Canada) Williams Lake British Columbia, Williams Lake Arena	
Win	Debut	(Canada) Tyler Jackson	MD	4	October 27, 2007	(Canada) Richmond British Columbia, River Rock Casino	Pro Debut

== CPBC Light Middleweight Championship ==
On March 10, 2011, the 26-year-old won the CPBC Light Middleweight Championship bout with a spectacular KO stoppage of Anthony "Hits Hard" Lessard in Calgary, Alberta.

== Move to Middleweight ==
Mclellan relinquished his Canadian Professional Boxing Council's Light Middleweight title and made a move to Middleweight. On March 2, 2013, he fought Fitz "The Whip" Vanderpool for the National Boxing Authority - Middleweight title and lost a Unanimous Judges Decision to the 45-year-old former World Champion.
