= Northern Thunderbird Air =

Canadian charter airline and medevac service

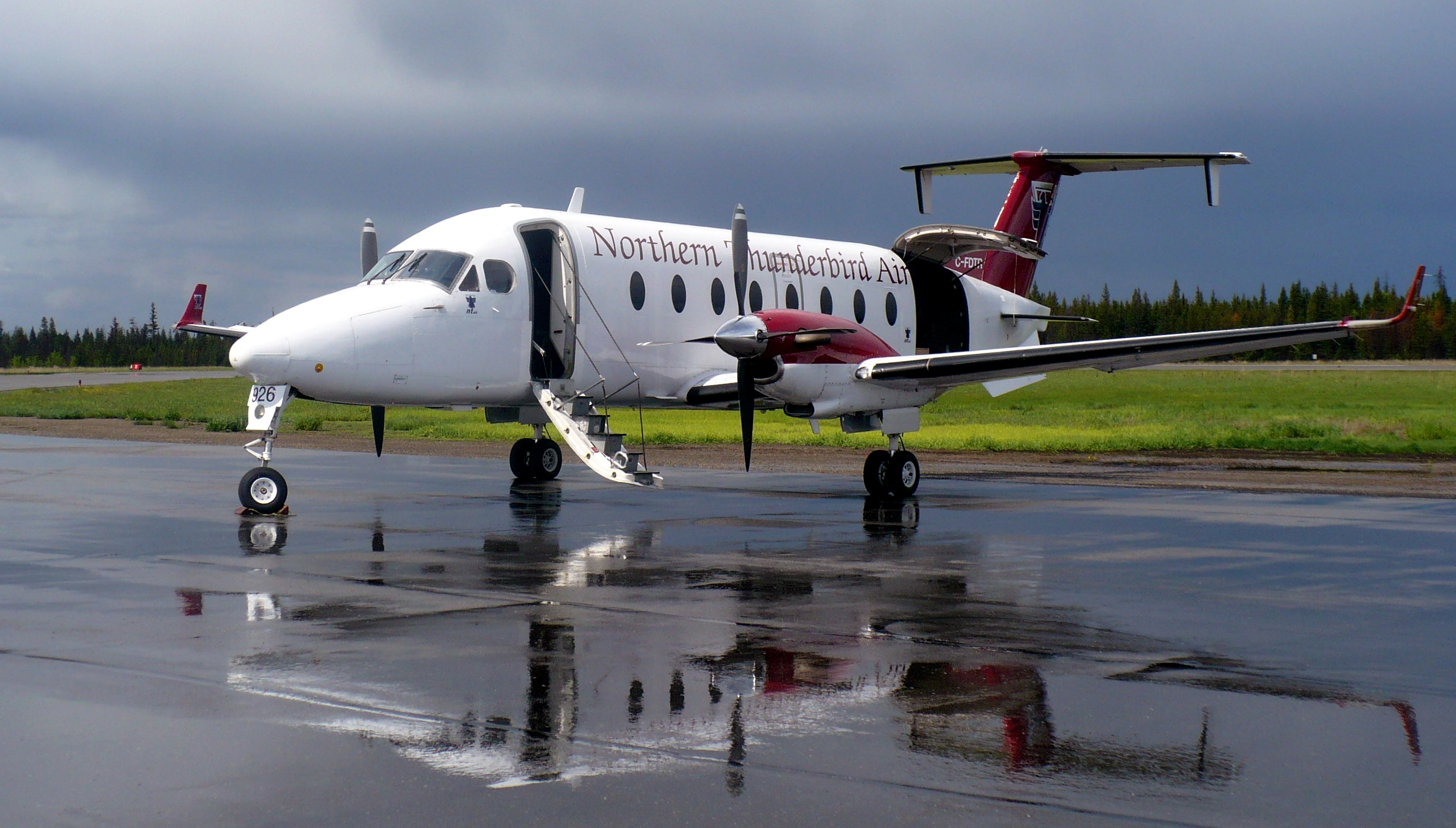
- Beechcraft 1900 at Williams Lake Airport
IATA	ICAO	Call sign
-	NTA	THUNDERBIRD
- Founded: 1971
- AOC #: 11492
- Hubs: Prince George
- Secondary hubs: Smithers; Vancouver
- Alliance: Central Mountain Air
- Fleet size: 16
- Destinations: Charter only
- Parent company: Northern Thunderbird Air Limited
- Headquarters: Prince George, British Columbia, Canada
- Website: www.ntair.ca

Northern Thunderbird Air Inc or NT Air is a Canadian charter airline and medevac service based in Prince George, British Columbia.

== History ==
NT Air was formed in 1971 with the merger of two of northern British Columbia's airlines: Northern Mountain Airlines and Thunderbird Airlines.

Northern Mountain Airlines began operations at Fort St. James in 1959. With a fleet consisting of Cessnas, DHC-2 Beavers, Beech 18s, Grumman Goose, and helicopters, Northern Mountain served Northern Canada including Alberta, Yukon and Northwest Territories. After merging its airplane division with Thunderbird, Northern Mountain continued operating helicopter service until 2000.

Thunderbird Airlines was formed in the early 1960s when it acquired the bush operations of Pacific Western Airlines in Prince George. From its base at Tabor Lake, Thunderbird operated Cessnas, Beavers and DHC Otters on floats and skis servicing the new town of Mackenzie and the northern villages and logging camps of Williston Lake. In the early 1970s, Thunderbird secured a subcontract from Pacific Western Airlines to service the smaller communities of B.C as a feeder airline, leading to a merger between Northern Mountain and Thunderbird Airlines in 1971 due to the need for a hangar at Prince George Airport.

Northern Thunderbird Air now consists of a fleet of 14 aircraft with three bases, 21 scheduled points and over 100 employees.

== Sister airline ==
Northern Thunderbird Air is the sister airline of Central Mountain Air, utilizing their large aircraft capability and bases in British Columbia and Alberta. Central Mountain Air offers scheduled services, while Northern Thunderbird Air does not. Both airlines offer charter and special services on their website.

== Services ==
- British Columbia
  - Prince George
  - Prince Rupert
  - Mackenzie
  - Ospika
  - Tsay Keh
  - Fort Ware
  - Smithers
  - Dease Lake
  - Vancouver
  - Sandspit
- Alberta
  - Calgary
  - Edmonton

== Fleet ==
As of 4 October 2026, Northern Thunderbird Air has the following aircraft registered with Transport Canada:

Aircraft	Count	Variants	Notes
Beechcraft 1900	14	1900D	18 passengers
Beechcraft Super King Air	2	300 series	8 or 9 passengers, MEDEVAC
Total	16		

The fourteen Northern Thunderbird Beechcraft 1900D's bear the Central Mountain Air paint scheme and logo but are dual registered with Northern Thunderbird Air.

== Incidents and accidents ==
- On September 30, 1975, Northern Thunderbird Air Twin Otter, registered CF-MHU, crashed into the side of 5,200 foot mountain ridge, shortly after takeoff from Kluatantan, British Columbia. The two pilots and all five passengers were killed on impact.
- On January 14, 1977, Northern Thunderbird Air Twin Otter, registered C-GNTB, operating under Pacific Western Airlines Flight 405, crashed into a mountain during its approach to runway 32 in a snowstorm killing all 12 passenger and crew on board. Weather conditions, including limited visibility and heavy snowfall, were significant factors contributing to the accident.
- On July 28, 2005, Northern Thunderbird Air Flight 202, registered C-FCGL, crashed into a narrow canyon while on a ferrying flight. Both crew members on board died.
- On October 27, 2011, Northern Thunderbird Air Flight 204, serial number B-36, registered C-GXRX, crashed on Russ Baker Way next to Vancouver International Airport in Richmond, British Columbia as it was attempting to make a landing, killing the pilot, 44-year-old Luc Fortin. It had departed the airport earlier but turned around due to indications of an aircraft malfunction (the engine oil pressure indicator); it crashed about 900 m (3,000 ft) short of the runway. Five of the nine passengers were seriously injured. On 16 November 2011, the co-pilot of the flight, 26-year-old Matt Robic, died as well.
