= School District 27 Cariboo-Chilcotin =

School district in British Columbia, Canada

- School District 27 Cariboo-Chilcotin logo

Location
- Williams Lake Williams Lake, 100 Mile House, 150 Mile House, Anahim Lake, Lone Butte, Horsefly, Lac La Hache in Northwest Canada

District information
- Superintendent: Mr. Chris van der Mark
- Schools: 30
- Budget: CA$52.8 million

Students and staff
- Students: 5,800

Other information
- Website: www.sd27.bc.ca

School District 27 Cariboo-Chilcotin is a school district in central British Columbia. It covers a large geographic area in the Chilcotin and Cariboo districts, from 100 Mile House in the south to Williams Lake in the north.

The school district had 30 schools as of May 2012. Of these, three are high schools, eight are junior secondary or combined elementary/junior secondary schools, 16 elementary schools and three provide alternative provision. The district also operates a Rural Secondary Program to allow learners to study from home in remote rural areas using virtual classroom. A number of StrongStart BC programs operate in the district and specialist provision is also provided for First Nation learners.

The district educates around 5,800 students and has in the region of 1,000 employees.

== Schools ==
The district has a number of Elementary/Junior schools located in more remote rural areas. These allow learners to continue to study close to their homes. They cater for students in grades 8 and 9, with the opportunity to include grade 10 learners if demand exists.

School enrollment varies between very low numbers – as low as 15 students enrolled at some of the more remote elementary schools in September 2020 – to over 800 students at Columneetza Secondary School and Lake City Secondary.

School	Location	Grades
100 Mile House Elementary School	100 Mile House	K-7
100 Mile House Jr Secondary School	100 Mile House	Closed as of June 2013
108 Mile Elementary School	108 Mile Ranch	K-7
150 Mile Elementary School	150 Mile House	K-6
Alexis Creek Elementary/Secondary School	Alexis Creek	K-10
Anahim Lake Elem-Jr Secondary School	Anahim Lake	K-10
Big Lake Elementary School	Big Lake	K-7
Bridge Lake Elementary School	Bridge Lake	Closed as of June 2016 due to low enrollment
Buffalo Creek Elementary School	100 Mile House	Closed as of June 2013
Cataline Elementary School	Williams Lake	K-6
Chilcotin Road Elementary School	Williams Lake	K-6
Columneetza Secondary School	Williams Lake	7–9
Dog Creek Elem-Jr. Secondary School	Dog Creek	K-10
Glendale Elementary School	Williams Lake	Closed as of June 2013
GROW-Graduation Routes Other Ways	Lac La Hache	Adult Education, Alternate Programs, Distance Education, Cross-Enrolled Courses
Horse Lake Elementary School	Lone Butte	K-7
Horsefly Elem-Jr Secondary School	Horsefly	K-10
Kwaleen Elementary School	Williams Lake	Closed as of June 2013
Lac La Hache Elementary School	Lac La Hache	K-7
Lake City Secondary School	Williams Lake	10–12
Likely Elem-Jr Secondary School	Likely	K-7
Marie Sharpe Elementary School	Williams Lake	K-7
Mountview Elementary School	Williams Lake	K-6
Naghtaneqed Elem-Jr Secondary School	Nemaiah Valley	K-10
Nenqayni Treatment Centre	Williams Lake	No enrollment as of September 2011
Nesika Elementary School	Williams Lake	K-6 French Immersion
Peter Skene Ogden Secondary School	100 Mile House	8–12
Skyline Alternate School	Williams Lake	9–12
Tatla Lake Elem-Jr Secondary School	Tatla Lake	K-10
Wildwood Elementary School	Williams Lake	Closed as of May 2015 due to mold.
Williams Lake Secondary School	Williams Lake	Closed as of June 2013

== See also ==
- List of school districts in British Columbia
