= Williams Lake Airport =

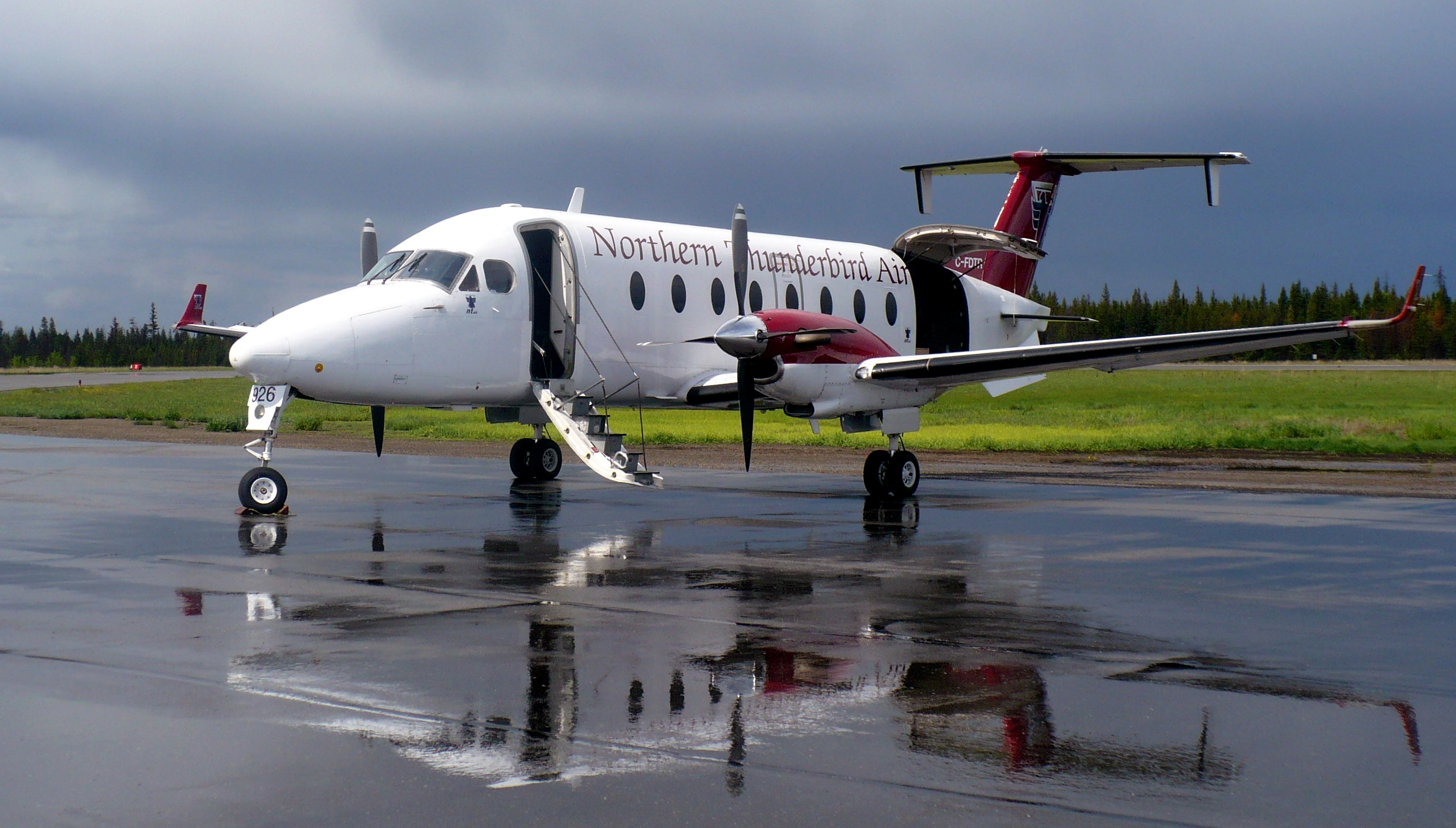
- Beechcraft 1900 of Northern Thunderbird Air
- IATA: YWL; ICAO: CYWL; WMO: 71104

Summary
- Airport type: Public
- Operator: City of Williams Lake
- Location: Williams Lake, British Columbia
- Time zone: MST (UTC−07:00)
- Elevation AMSL: 3,088 ft / 941 m
- Coordinates: 52°11′00″N 122°03′16″W
- Website: Official website

Map
- Location in British Columbia

Runways
Direction	Length		Surface
Direction	ft	m	Surface
12/30	6,966	2,123	Asphalt

Statistics (2010)
- Aircraft movements: 13,854
- Sources: Canada Flight Supplement; Environment Canada; Movements from Statistics Canada

Williams Lake Airport or Williams Lake Regional Airport (IATA: YWL, ICAO: CYWL) is located 4.2 nautical miles (7.8 km; 4.8 mi) northeast of Williams Lake, British Columbia, Canada.

== Facilities ==
Williams Lake Airport has seen ongoing improvements in infrastructure, including upgrades to the terminal and runway maintenance. While the airport is not a major international hub, it plays an essential role in connecting the central interior of British Columbia to larger cities, particularly Vancouver.

- Passenger services: The terminal offers basic services, including ticketing, baggage handling, and seating areas. There is limited retail and dining, as it is a smaller regional airport.
- Ground transportation: Taxis, rental cars, and private vehicle services are available. Williams Lake is well connected by road, so many passengers access the airport by car.
- Airlines: Air Canada, Central Mountain Air, and other regional operators serve this airport. Flights typically connect Williams Lake to Vancouver and other regional destinations.
- Cargo services: The airport also handles some cargo operations, particularly for regional and resource-based industries

== Airlines and destinations ==
Airlines	Destinations
Central Mountain Air	Vancouver
Pacific Coastal Airlines	Vancouver

== See also ==
- Williams Lake Water Aerodrome
