= List of Légion d'honneur recipients by name (W) =

The French government gives out the Legion of Honour awards, to both French and foreign nationals, based on a recipient's exemplary services rendered to France, or to the causes supported by France. This award is divided into five distinct categories (in ascending order), i.e. three ranks: Knight, Officer, Commander, and two titles: Grand Officer and Grand Cross. Knight is the most common and is awarded for either at least 20 years of public service or acts of military or civil bravery. The rest of the categories have a quota for the number of years of service in the category below before they can be awarded. The Officer rank requires a minimum of eight years as a Knight, and the Commander, the highest civilian category for a non-French citizen, requires a minimum of five years as an Officer. The Grand Officer and the Grand Cross are awarded only to French citizens, and each requires three years' service in their respective immediately lower rank. The awards are traditionally published and promoted on 14 July.

The following is a non-exhaustive list of recipients of the Legion of Honour awards, since the first ceremony in May 1803. 2,550 individuals can be awarded the insignia every year. The total number of awards is close to 1 million (estimated at 900,000 in 2021, including over 3,000 Grand Cross recipients), with some 92,000 recipients alive today. Only until 2008 was gender parity achieved amongst the yearly list of recipients, with the total number of women recipients since the award's establishment being only 59 at the end of the second French empire and only 26,000 in 2021.

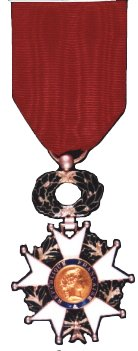

Recipient	Dates (birth – death)	General work & reason for the recognition	Award category (date)
James Waddell	1873 – 1954	Highly decorated New Zealand World War I. Recognised for: - Knight: His bravery in leading his battalion in a costly attack against Turkish trenches on 21 June 1915 (Knight); Officer: His actions during the Battle of the Somme where his personal example helped carry an attack on the village of Belloy-en-Santerre	Knight (4 July 1915); Officer (10 June 1917); Commander (1920)
Youssef Wahba Pasha	1852 – 1934	Prime Minister of Egypt	TBA
Mourad Wahba Pasha	1879 – 1972	Egyptian politician and high court judge	TBA
Sadek Wahba Pasha	1966 – Present	American economist and investor	TBA
Magdi Wahba	1925 – 1991	Egyptian university professor	TBA
Mark Wainberg	1900 – 1985	Leading Canadian AIDS Researcher. Recognised for his HIV/AIDS research	Knight
Nancy Wake	1912 – 2011	Resistance Commander in WW2, highly decorated allied servicewoman. Recognised for her wartime Service	Knight (1970); Officer (1988)
Malvin E. Walker		American Army Officer World War II	TBA
Sean Walsh		79th Armoured Division (Royal Merchant Navy) Cork, Ireland and Canada. D Day December 1941	TBA
Herbert Ward	1863 – 1919	Sculptor and Red Cross officer during World War I.	Officer (1911)
Rose Warfman	1916 – 2016	French survivor of Auschwitz and member of the French Resistance. Recognised for her work in the French Resistance.	Knight (10 February 1959); Officer (10 April 2009)
Oswald Watt	1878 - 1921	Australian aviator and businessman. Recognised for crash-landing in no man's land and succeeded in making it back to French lines with valuable intelligence under intense fire from German positions.	TBA
John Webber	1751 – 1793	Telegrapher in British Navy during D-Day Landings on Sword Beach awarded Medal	TBA (27 May 2015)
Nicholas Fox Weber		American cultural historian and foundation director	TBA
Herman Armour Webster	1878 - 1970	American cultural historian and foundation director, artist and French windmill preservationist	Knight (1926); Officer (1956)
Ben Weider	1923 – 2008	Soldier, author, historian (Napoleonic history), fitness proponent, benefactor of the arts, and entrepreneur. Recognised for his research into Napoleon's death.	Knight (12 October 2000)
Léon Weil	1896 – 2006	One of the last two surviving veterans of the battle of Val-de-Marne in the World War I	
Arnold Weinstock	1924 – 2002	English industrialist and businessman (Formed the General Electric Company)	
Pierre Weiss	1865 – 1940	French physicist specialized in magnetism (He developed the domain theory of ferromagnetism)	
David Weisstub	1944–Present	Philippe Pinel professor of legal psychiatry and biomedical ethics at the Université de Montréal	
Wladyslaw Wejtko	1859 – 1933	Imperial Russian Army general of Polish descent (He fought on the side of the Second Polish Republic as a major-general in Józef Piłsudski's forces during the Polish-Soviet War)	
Arsène Wenger	1949–Present	Arsenal Football Club Manager (2002)	
William Westmoreland	1914 – 2005	United States Army general (A commander of United States forces during the Vietnam War, subsequently serving as Chief of Staff of the United States Army).	
Maxime Weygand	1867 – 1965	French military commander in World War I and World War II.	
Joseph Weyland	1943–Present	Luxemburg diplomat	
Edith Wharton	1862 – 1937	American novelist, short story writer, and designer.	
Earle Wheeler	1908 – 1975	United States Army general (who served as Chief of Staff of the United States Army and then as Chairman of the Joint Chiefs of Staff, holding the latter position during the Vietnam War).	
Belle Armstrong Whitney	1861 – 1922	American writer and "fashion expert", based in Paris.	Knight
Bolesław Wieniawa-Długoszowski	1881 – 1942	Polish general, adjutant to Chief of State Józef Piłsudski, politician, freemason, diplomat, poet, artist and formally for one day the President of the Republic of Poland.	
Elie Wiesel	1928 – 2016	Holocaust survivor, author, and Nobel Laureate	
Marion Wiesel	1931 – 2025	Holocaust survivor, translator, and philanthropist	
Simon Wiesenthal	1908 – 2005	Jewish Austrian Holocaust survivor, Nazi hunter, and writer.	
Harvey Ladew Williams, Jr.	1900 – 1986	International businessman	
Arthur Knyvet Wilson	1842 – 1921	Royal Navy officer (He served in the Anglo-Egyptian War and then the Mahdist War being awarded the Victoria Cross during the Battle of El Teb)	
Henry Hughes Wilson	1864 – 1922	One of the most senior British Army staff officers of the World War I and was briefly an Irish unionist politician.	
Ronald Wilson		Member of regiment of Royal Engineers	TBA (2018)
Jean-Pierre Wimille	1908 – 1949	Grand Prix motor racing driver and member of the French Resistance during World War II.	
Edwin B. Winans (U.S. Army general)	1869 – 1947	United States Army officer who attained the rank of major general.	
Wong Kar Wai	1958–Present	Hong Kong film director.	
Evelyn Wood (British Army officer)	1838 – 1919	British Army officer.	
Klaus Wowereit	1953–Present	German politician for the Social Democratic Party (SPD), Governing Mayor of Berlin.	
Orville Wright	1871 – 1948	One of the American aviation pioneers generally credited with inventing, building, and flying the world's first successful motor-operated airplane.	
Wilbur Wright	1867 – 1912	One of the American aviation pioneers generally credited with inventing, building, and flying the world's first successful motor-operated airplane.	
Katharine Wright	1874 – 1929	Younger sister of aviation pioneers Wilbur and Orville Wright, with whom she worked closely.	
Severin Wunderman			
Reinhold Würth	1935–Present	German billionaire businessman and art collector.	

== See also ==
- Legion of Honour
- List of Legion of Honour recipients by name
- List of foreign recipients of Legion of Honour by name
- List of foreign recipients of the Legion of Honour by country
- List of British recipients of the Legion of Honour for the Crimean War
- Legion of Honour Museum
- Ribbons of the French military and civil awards
- War Cross (France)
