= Wahba =

Wahba is a both a given name and a surname.

== People with the given name ==
- Wahba Zuhayli (1932–2015), Syrian Islamic scholar specializing in Islamic law and legal philosophy

== People with the surname ==
- Ahmed Bushara Wahba (born 1943), Sudanese football player
- Grace Wahba (born 1934), American academic and statistician
- Hedaya Malak Wahba (born 1993), Egyptian taekwondo practitioner
- Hafiz Wahba (1889–1967), Egypt-born Saudi Arabian government official
- Magdi Wahba (1925–1991), Egyptian university professor, Johnsonian scholar, and lexicographer
- Marcelle Wahba, American diplomat
- Mourad Wahba (1879–1972), Egyptian jurist and politician
- Murad Wahba (1926–2026), Egyptian writer, philosopher and academic
- Mustafa Wahba, Saudi politician
- Rachel Wahba (born 1946), therapist and an author of her own book; a memoir about her family
- Sadek Wahba (born 1965), American economist and investor
- Youssef Wahba (1852–1934), Egyptian politician and jurist
