= Bus companies in Ontario =

Operators of buses in a province of Canada

Bus companies in Ontario range in scale from small family-run businesses to subsidiaries of large international transportation groups. Many operate yellow school buses for student transportation on behalf of local school boards, while others concentrate on luxury coach charters and tours. Some municipalities use these private companies to run their public transit systems.

== ToorBus ==
ToorBus is an Ontario based charter and group transportation company providing coach bus, shuttle, and limousine services for weddings, corporate events, airport transfers, and private group travel. The company serves cities across Ontario and has expanded its operations to accommodate growing demand for event and group transportation.

== Gray Line Toronto ==
Toronto Based Tour and Charter company, with over 100 years in the industry. Gray Line Toronto is locally owned by Crystal Sheriff, owner of VIP Ontario Tours, with a large fleet of luxury coach busses spanning across Ontario.

== 417 Bus Line ==
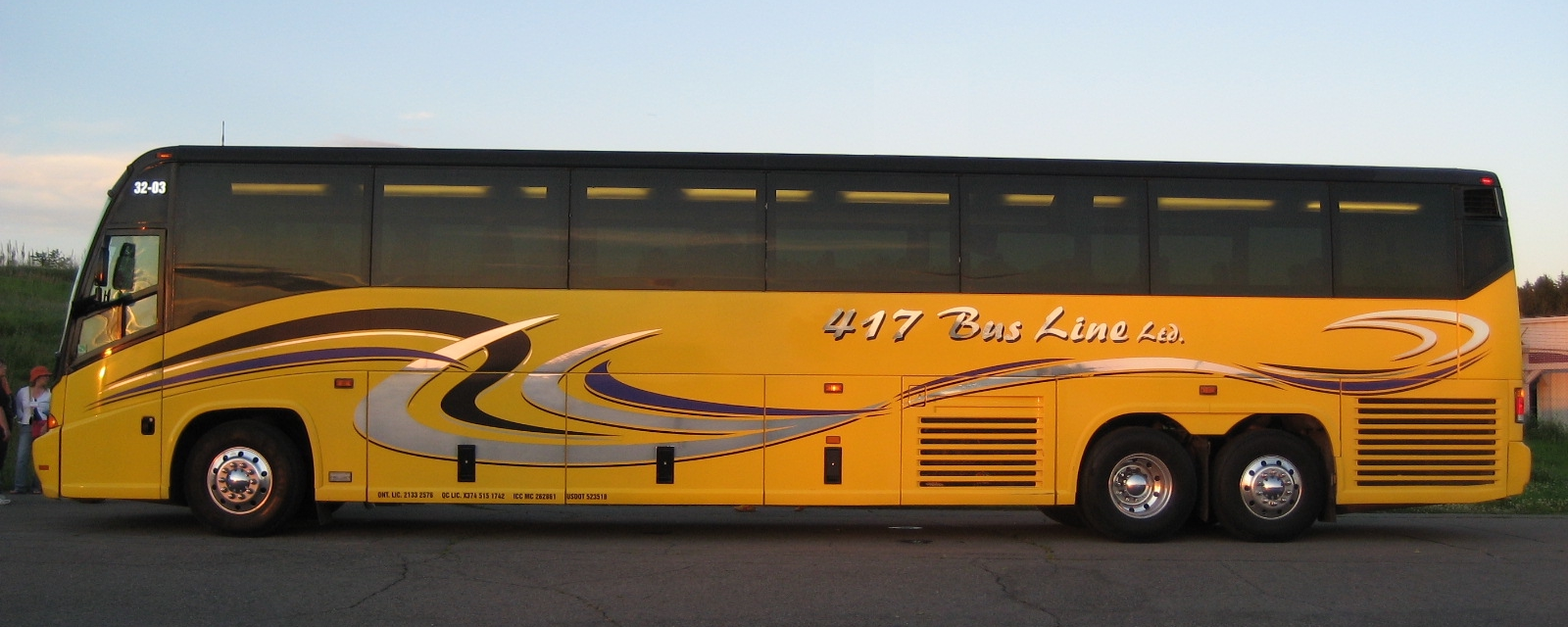

417 Bus Line is a coach and school bus operator in Casselman, a small village on Ontario Provincial Highway 417 between Ottawa and Montreal. The company began as Laplante Bus Line in 1958, which became Casselman Bus Line in 1965 and was incorporated in 1974 as 417 Bus Line Ltd. The founder, Jean-Paul Laplante, started with a single vehicle transporting students to the local school. Steady growth of the fleet lead to expansion with a bus route between Casselman and Ottawa. The family continues to operate the company today. In 2023, 417 Bus Line Ltd. was acquired by Switzer-Carty Transportation, the formal acquisition began in the summer of 2024.

417 Bus Line Ltd. includes Lalonde Bus Line, Matte Bus Line, Larocque Bus Line and Bergeron Bus Lines as part of its operations, which have a combined fleet of over 150 units.

=== Public transit operations ===
Transit Eastern Ontario operated under the authority of the former North Glengarry Prescott Russell (NGPR) Transport Board.
Clarence-Rockland Transpo is operated by Lalonde Bus Line

== Aboutown ==
Aboutown Transportation was a diversified transportation company based in the city of London, serving southwestern Ontario for over 60 years. Bus services that it operated included charters, intercity routes and public transit systems in Chatham-Kent and St. Thomas. During the school year it once operated six transit bus routes between Kings and Brescia Colleges, and the main campus at the University of Western Ontario. Local services provided in the London area included taxis, limousines, school buses, paratransit services, minibus charters, shuttle services and airport services. It also operated Foot's Bay Marina on Lake Joseph in Muskoka, and Trillium Sport Aviation Inc., a 50 percent owned affiliate, based at London International Airport. Aboutown entered into receivership in Sept 2013, citing over $2 million in debts. Operations ceased after 60 years of service in Southwestern Ontario.

=== NorthLink ===
This intercity bus service once connected communities throughout southwestern Ontario, with no more than thirteen scheduled routes.

- NL-1: Owen Sound - Kincardine - Clinton - London
- NL-2: Owen Sound - Hanover - Listowel - Kitchener
- NL-3: Wingham - Listowel - Stratford
- NL-4: St. Thomas - London - Port Stanley
- NL-5: Sarnia - Strathroy-Caradoc - London
- NL-7: London - Stratford - Kitchener
- NL-8: Guelph - Hamilton
- NL-9: Goderich - Clinton - Stratford
- NL-10: St. Catharines/Niagara Falls - St. Thomas - London
- NL-11: Muskoka - Barrie - Toronto
- NL-13: Toronto - Brampton - Orangeville - Owen Sound
- NL-15: Windsor - Chatham
- NL-16: Guelph - Cambridge - Brantford
- All Services Now Suspended

=== Public transit operations ===
CK Transit(now operated by CitiLinx Transit)
St. Thomas Transit (now Voyageur Transportation)

== Attridge Transportation ==
Attridge is a Burlington based school bus company providing bus service in the Golden Horseshoe area.

Attridge also has a separate operating division, Attridge Coach Lines. They operate a fleet of Prevost and Volvo coaches offering charter services.

== AVM Max 2000 ==
AVM Max 2000 is a Toronto based charter bus rental company providing chartered bus rental experience in Greater Toronto Area. Its fleet consists of 21 to 24 passenger mini buses, 48 to 58 passenger coaches, school buses and passenger vans. It offers chartered bus rental service from Toronto to anywhere in North America.

== Ayr ==
Ayr Coach Lines is a small family-owned business which provides charter services in the southwestern Ontario cities of Waterloo, Kitchener and Cambridge. It has a diverse fleet of motor coaches, activity coaches and mini coaches.

== Badder ==
Badder Bus Service is a charter bus company that started in 1950 in Thamesville as a school bus company. In 1978, due to the demand for charter service, it acquired highway coaches.

In 2006 the company was split, with Badder Bus Service Limited becoming a charter oriented company, with the integration of the newly acquired coach operations of 'Gino's Bus Lines of Ingersoll, and The Badder Group Incorporated being created out of their school bus operations which had expanded with the addition of Waylin Bus Lines of Aylmer in 1995 and Elgin Bus Service in 1997.

=== Services ===
Badder is licensed to operate charter buses from the cities of Hamilton and Toronto, the regional municipalities of Durham, Halton, Niagara, Peel, Waterloo and York, the municipality of Chatham-Kent, the counties of Brant, Bruce, Dufferin, Elgin, Essex, Grey, Haldimand, Huron, Lambton, Middlesex, Norfolk, Oxford, Perth and Wellington.

The school bus division serves the Thames Valley District School Board, London District Catholic School Board, Lambton Kent District School Board, St. Clair Catholic District School Board, and Conseil scolaire Viamonde.

== Bergeron Bus Lines ==
Bergeron Bus Lines was a commuter and school bus operator based in Vars.

=== Public transit operations ===
Begeron operated a commuter bus service for the Township of Russell Transit Service, as part of the Rural Partners Transit Service of OC Transpo. Bergeron Bus Lines was purchased by 417 Bus Line in 2013.

== Can-Am Express ==
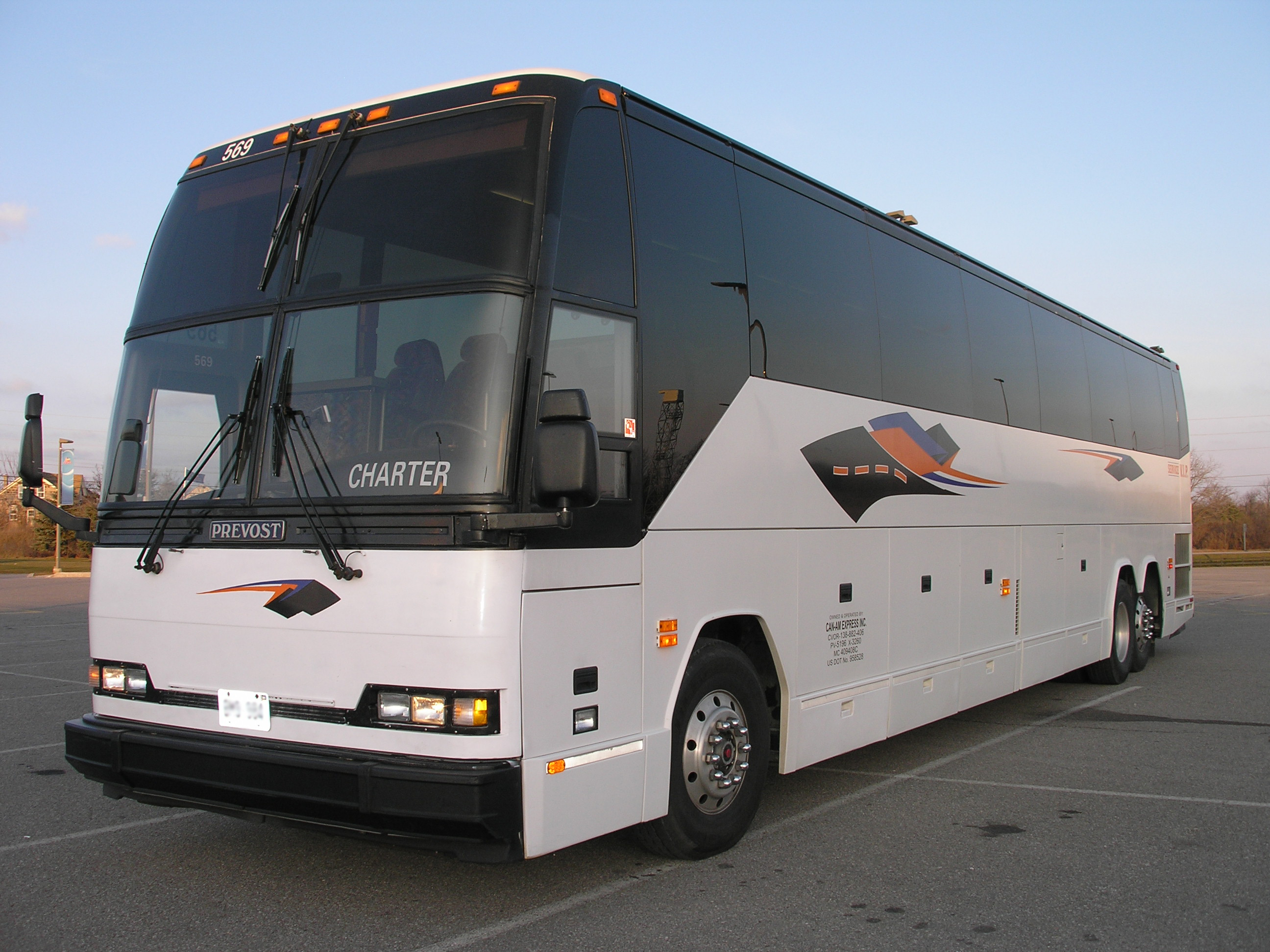

Bus and coach charter company located in Toronto. Fully licensed to travel in Canada and United States. Providing shuttle, casino, shopping and tourism travel.

== Cha-Co Trails ==
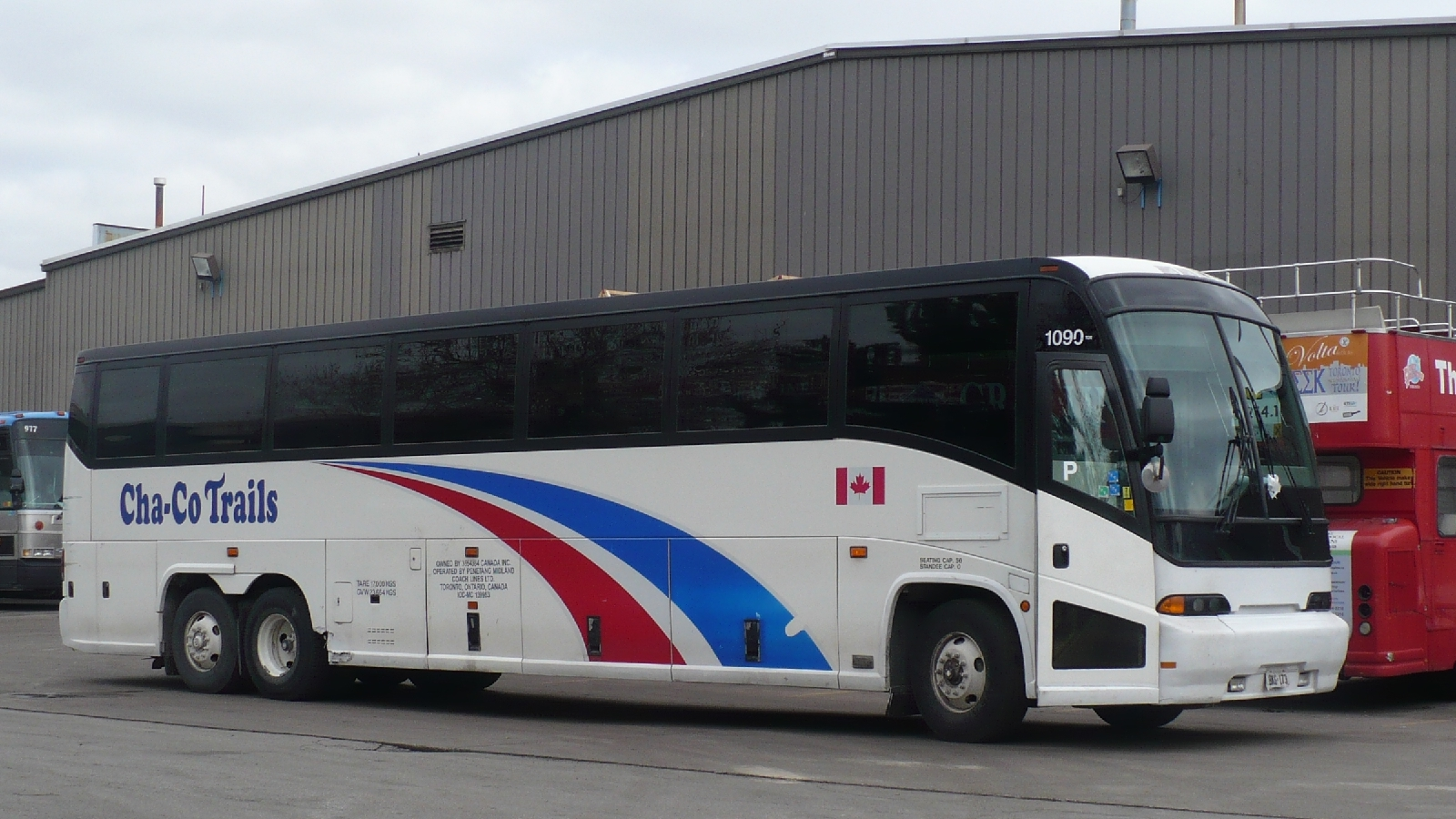
PMCL operated Cha-Co Trails coach in Greyhound livery

Cha-Co Trails provided charters and regional bus services throughout Ontario and to Detroit until being acquired by Laidlaw in 2000. The Charter buses are operated under Penetang Midland Coach Lines Ltd. (PMCL), Chatham Coach Lines (J. I. DeNure (Chatham) Limited) and Detroit based Chatham Coach Lines Inc., which are all subsidiaries of Greyhound Canada. All buses kept their Cha-Co Livery and some Greyhound bus were also converted to the Cha-Co Fleet. The majority of the buses were used in line runs between Detroit and Toronto.

Chatham Coach Lines was started in 1948 by J.I. DeNure in Chatham, Ontario after failed attempts at having a transit service In the spring of 1949 he expanded into charter service and in the summer of 1949 purchased Thames View Bus Lines to also start carrying students on school bus routes In 1950 obtained an I.C.C number to be able to run charters to the U.S.A. By the end of 1970's Chatham Coach was the largest carrier for school buses and Charters in Southern Ontario expanding to garages in both Windsor(Ont) and London(Ont). Through the 80's and 90's acquired many Coach companies throughout Southern Ontario to becomes one of the biggest Charter Companies in the country. The operating name was changed to Cha-Co-Trails in 1988. In the 1990's the city transit was taken over by the city of Chatham with the company providing storage, maintenance and drivers. The company continued to be a pillar in the transit community in Ontario before it was acquired by Laidlaw in 2000. The School bus and Charter parts where split and the Charter buses became part of Greyhound Canada's local operations, while the school bus part continues to this day(now First Student Canada)

== Cherrey Bus Lines ==
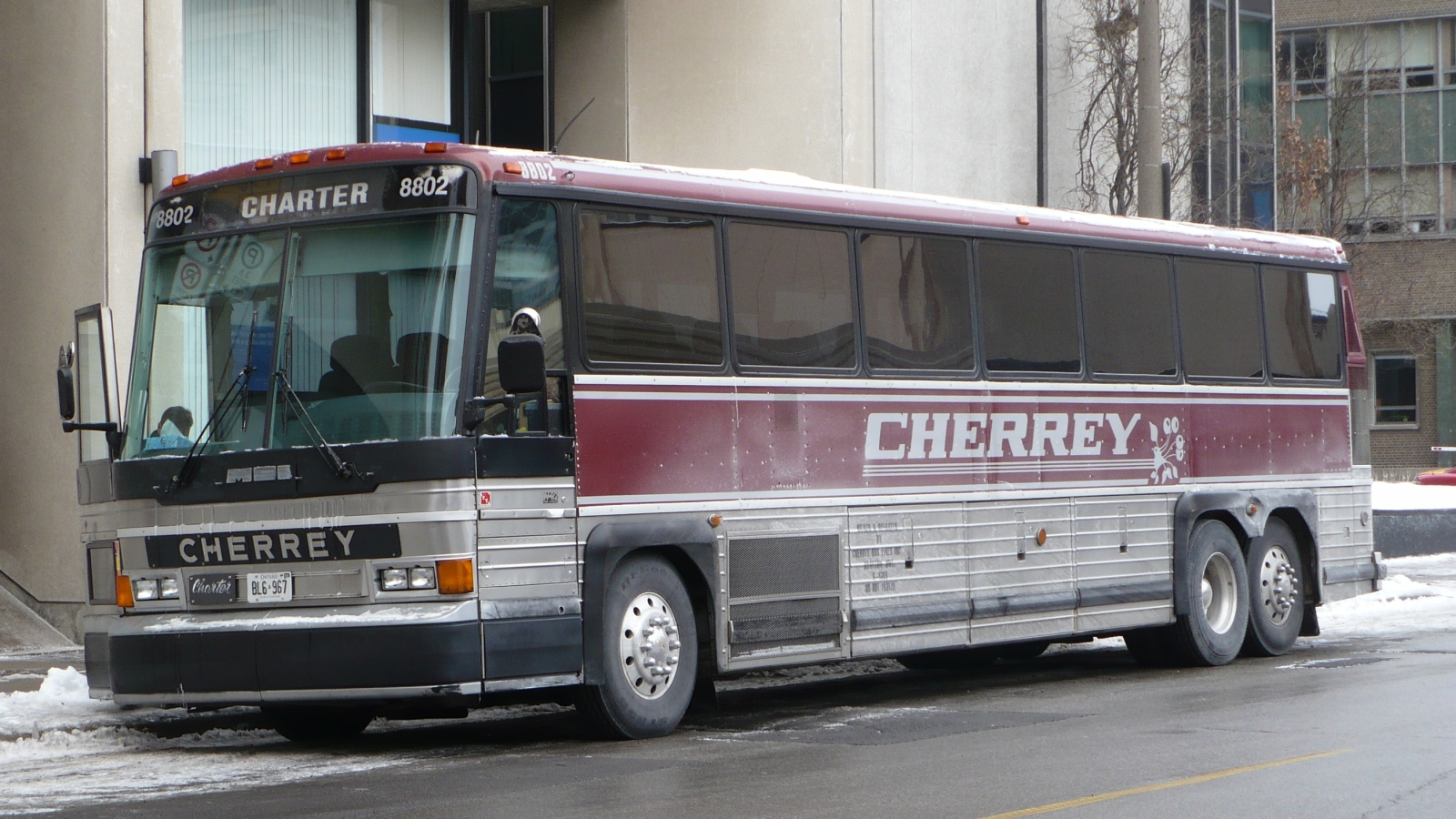

Cherrey Bus Lines was a Listowel and Stratford based operator of motorcoaches, activity buses, school buses, and passenger vans. It provides day trips, sightseeing, and tours through their Maxey Travel and Robin Hood Tours divisions.

Cherrey and its subsidiaries were purchased by Badder Bus Lines in late 2018 and early 2019.

== Coach Canada ==
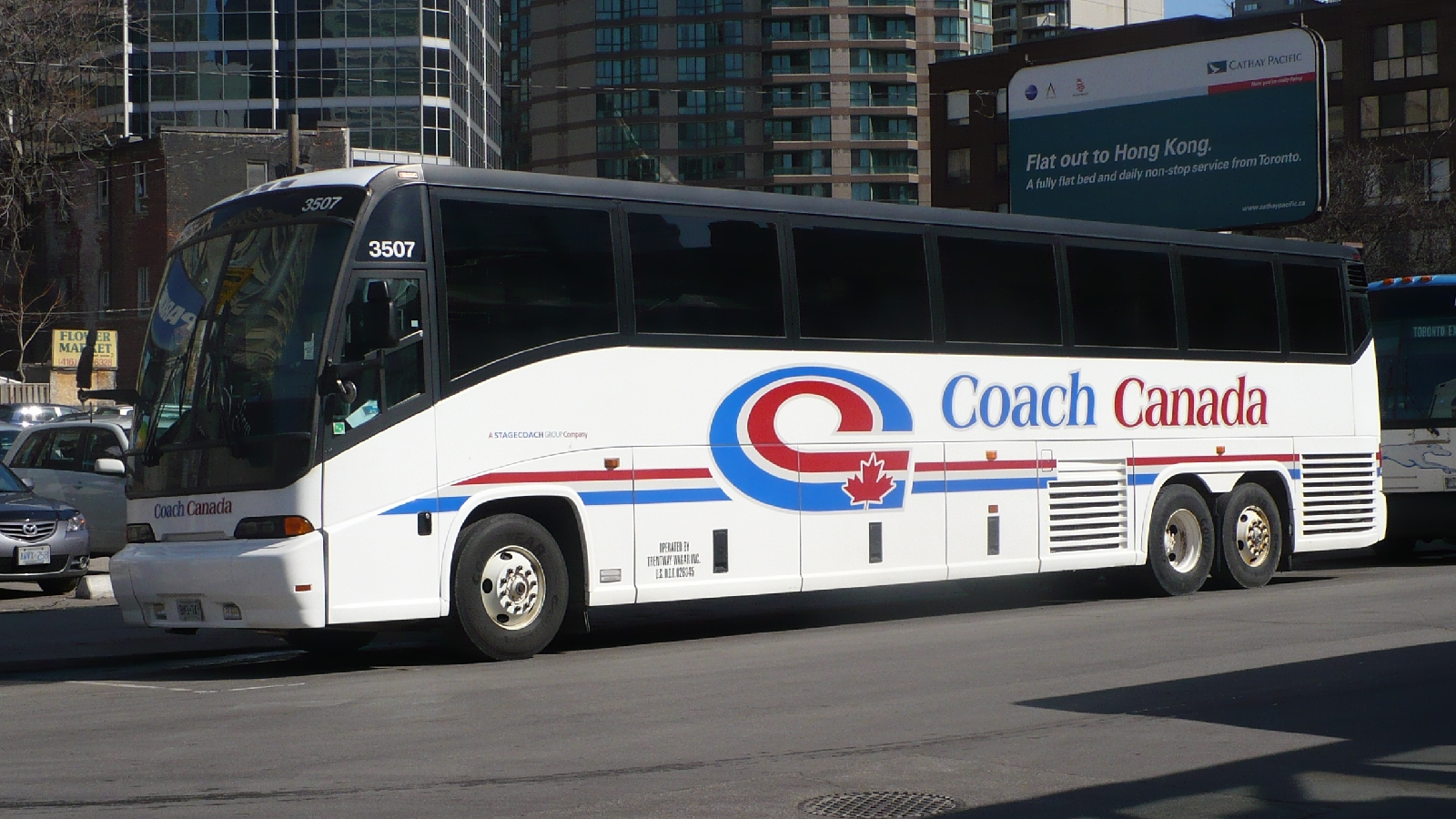

Coach Canada started out in 1956, originally as Trentway Bus Lines. It was later acquired by Coach USA, and is part of the North American operations of Stagecoach, the international transport group. The Canadian subsidiary is independently operated, headquartered in Peterborough with locations in Toronto, Niagara Falls, Kingston and Montreal. Coach Canada operates charter services with motorcoaches, school buses, activity buses and mini-coaches with one of the largest pick-up area authority in Ontario with a combined fleet of over 200 vehicles. It operates throughout the urban areas of southern Ontario and Quebec, with intercity service extending as far as New York City. Intercity services are operated by Coach Canada, under the brand of Megabus. Coach Canada also owns and operates Gray Line Montreal Sightseeing, offering day tours in Montreal and Quebec.

== Dallas Coach ==
Dallas Coach, was based in Mississauga, provides bus charters, shuttle services and tours, mainly in the Greater Toronto Area.

== Delaney Bus Lines ==
Delaney Bus Lines was a charter, tour, and school bus company headquartered in Avonmore. Founded in 1948, it provides school services for the Upper Canada District School Board and the Catholic District School Board of Eastern Ontario. It also offers several casino tour packages.

Delaney is the operator of three routes for OC Transpo's Rural Partnership Services. Route 515 connects the city of Cornwall with Ottawa and the government offices in Gatineau, Quebec; it also serves the villages of St. Andrew's West and Bonville in South Stormont, and the villages of Monkland and Moose Creek in North Stormont. Route 516 connects the North Stormont villages of Finch, Berwick, and Crysler with the nation's capital. Route 517 runs between Ottawa/Gatineau and the North Glengarry villages of Alexandria and Maxville.

In July 2018, Delaney Bus lines sold their school bus fleet to Roxborough Bus Lines and their highway coaches to 417 Bus Lines, after 70 years of service.

== Farr's Coach Lines ==
Farr's Coach Lines was a charter, tour and school bus company headquartered in Dunnville, ON. Farr's operated a fleet of Highway Coaches, School Buses and offered tours through their sister company Cardinal Tours. The company ceased operations in the early 2000's.

== First Student ==
First Student Canada, a subsidiary of the UK company FirstGroup, is a major provider of school bus services which used to be operated as Laidlaw Transit and Cardinal.

== Franklin ==
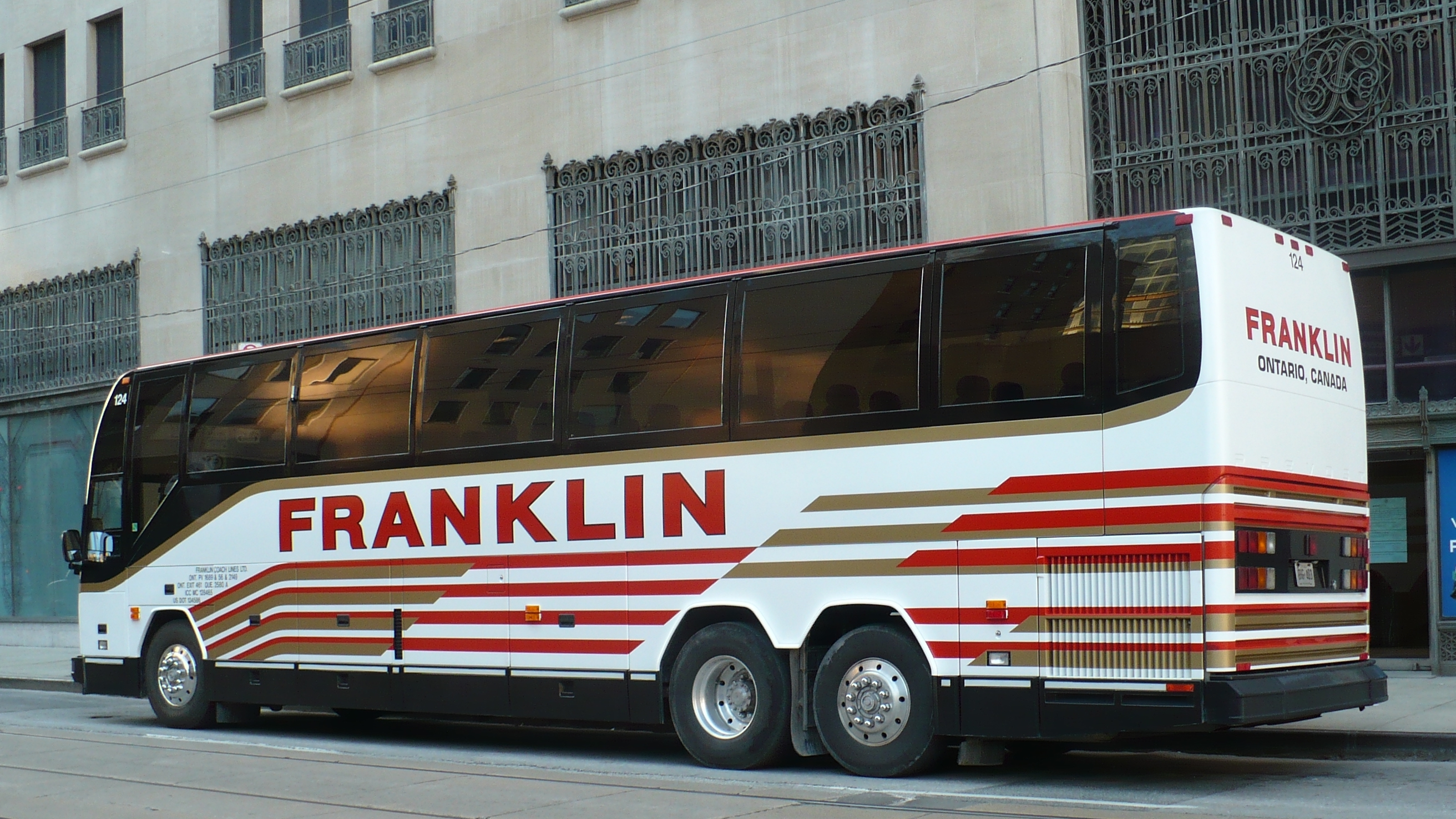

Franklin Coach Lines of Belleville

== Groupe Galland ==
Groupe Galland is a company providing school, coach, charter, commuter, and parcel services. Headquartered in Laval, Quebec, it was founded as a school bus operator in 1941. The business runs OC Transpo Rural Partnership Service Route 538. This line connected Carleton Place with Ottawa and Gatineau.

== Great Canadian Coaches ==

Great Canadian Coaches is a Kitchener provider of motorcoach charters and tours which began as Travel Ventures in 1984, and changed its name in 1998. Many of its fleet of over 40 Prevost, VanHool and MCI coaches have unique Canadian themed paint schemes. It is a member of the Trailways Transportation System.

== Greyhound Canada ==
Greyhound Canada, with its headquarters in Burlington, Ontario, was a subsidiary of Britain's FirstGroup, linked with the Dallas-based Greyhound Lines. Once Canada's largest intercity coach operator, it ceased operations on May 13, 2021.

== Healey ==
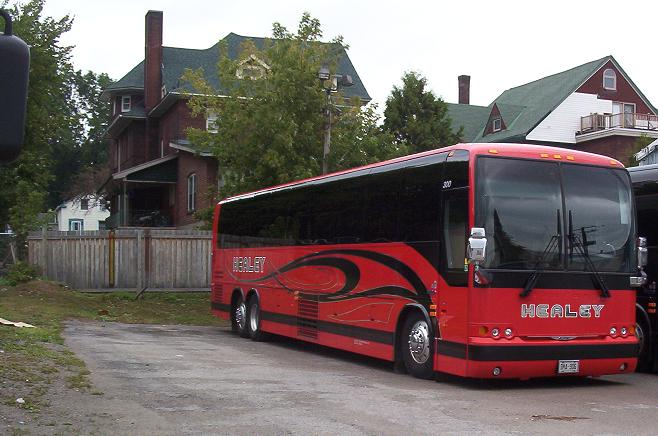

Healey Transportation is located in Smiths Falls, Ontario, providing coach charters and tours from the city of Ottawa, and the counties of Lanark, Leeds and Grenville and school bus services for school boards in Eastern Ontario. Healey operates five Prevost coaches and over 100 school buses, mini-buses and passenger vans.

== Howard Bus Service ==
Howard Bus Service is a school, charter, and coach operator located in Athens. It provides transportation to the Upper Canada District School Board. They also run OC Transpo's Rural Partnership Service Route 509, which connects Merrickville-Wolford with Ottawa.

== Kemptville Transportation Services ==
Kemptville Transportation Services is a school and charter bus operator located in Kemptville, Ontario. It runs two lines for OC Transpo's Rural Partnership Service. Route 542 provides express service between Kemptville and Ottawa and Gatineau. Route 543 connects Kemptville and North Gower to Downtown Ottawa.

== Leduc ==
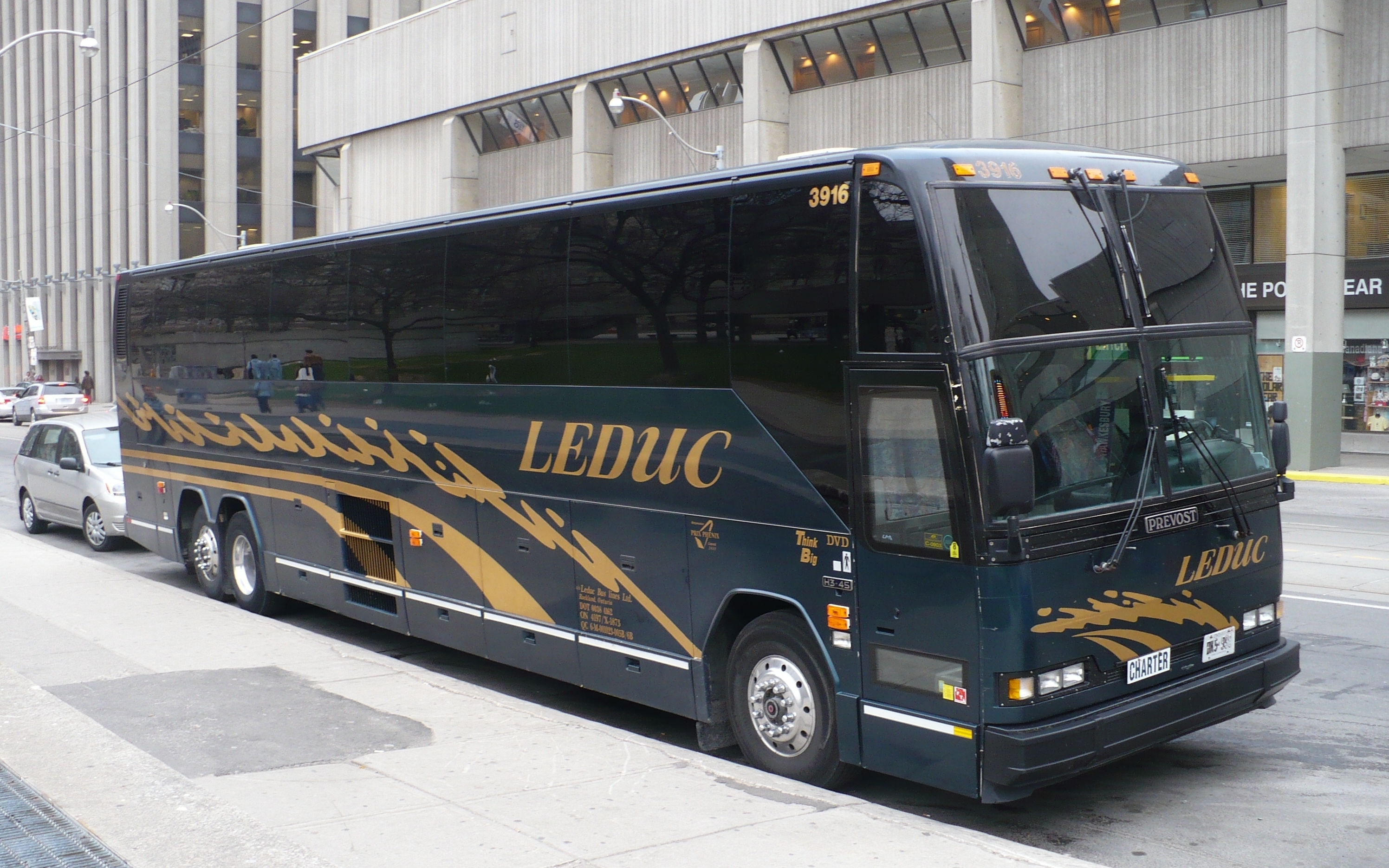

Leduc Bus Lines is a family-owned business, founded in 1968, in Rockland, Ontario. It provides highway coach, minibus, transit bus and school bus service in the Ottawa and Eastern Ontario area.

It operates three routes under the Rural Partners Transit Service of OC Transpo. Route 520 is operated directly. It travels from Hawkesbury connecting through L'Orignal, Alfred, Plantagenet and Wendover to Ottawa. Leduc also provides contracted services to run the two municipally managed routes of Clarence-Rockland Transpo.

== McCluskey Transportation Services ==
McCluskey Transportation Services is a school bus operator owned by Pacific Western Transportation.

== McCoy ==
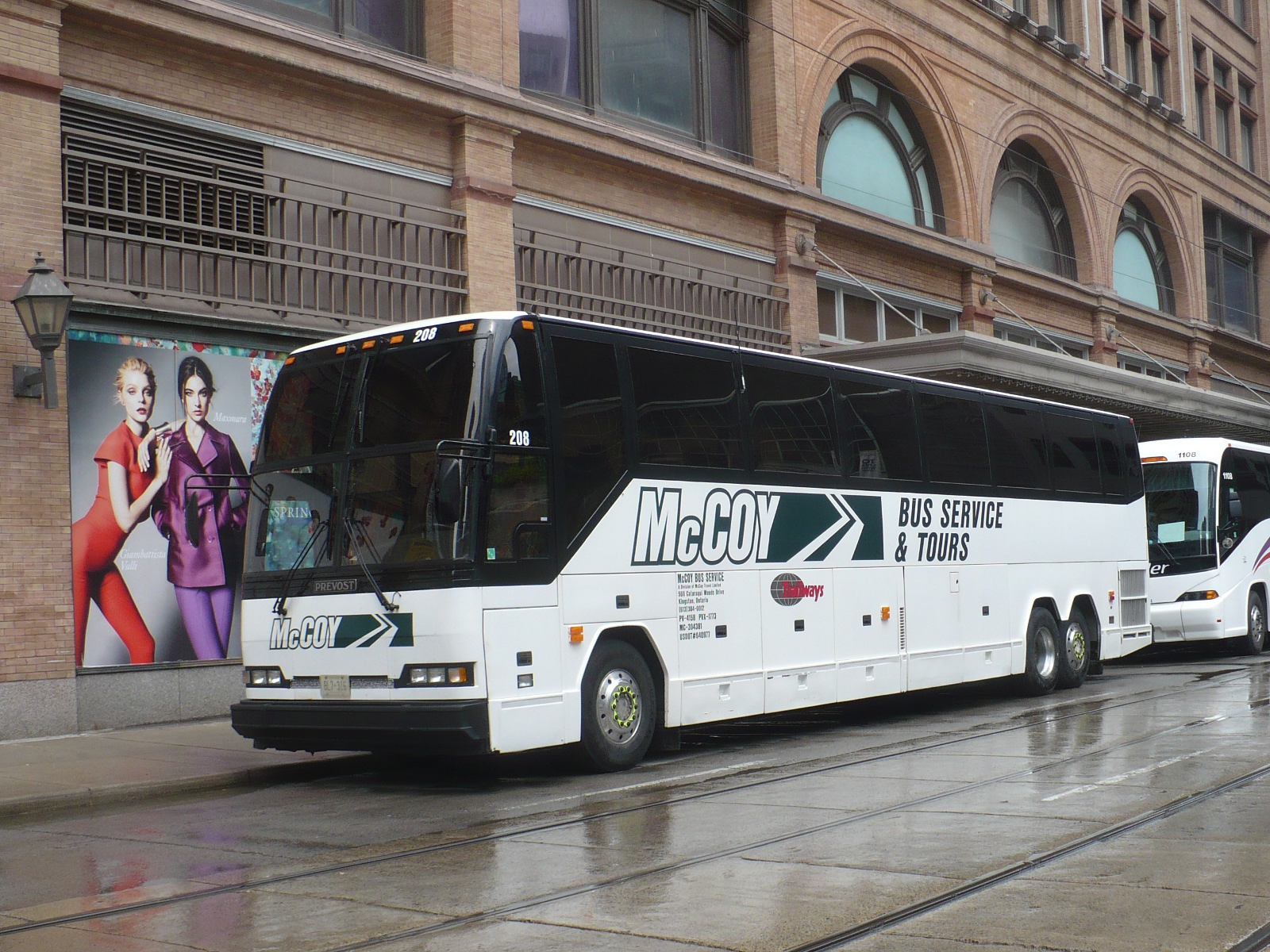

McCoy Bus Service, Kingston McCoy Bus Service is based in Kingston, Ontario. The company was started in 1979 by Ivan McCoy. The company started as a limousine service. In the 70's, Mr. McCoy owned a number of travel agencies in the Kingston area and started the limousine service as a way to get his travel agency clients to airports in Toronto, Ottawa, Montreal and Syracuse, NY. The 5 vehicle limousine service was purchased by Shawn Geary January 1, 1993 and is still owned and managed by him today. Geary added his first mini bus to the limousine fleet in 1995 and added his first 47 passenger Prevost motor coach to the fleet in 1997. In 2000 Geary sold the limousine service to focus on the bus and bus tour business. The company was grown from bus after bus, after bus until a current fleet of twenty late model Prevost 56 passenger motor coaches, four 33 passenger midsize coached, six 24 passenger mini coaches and six 15 passenger Ford Transit vans.

McCoy keeps the majority of their transportation equipment in Kingston but also has buses and vans located in Pembroke, Oshawa, Ajax and Ottawa. The company has contract shuttle services in Kingston, Ottawa, Pembroke, Oshawa, Ajax and Peterborough.

McCoy has their own repair facility attached to their office that operates under a separate name, Kingston Fleet & Auto Service Limited. The repair garage not only maintains McCoy's fleet but also offers automotive, truck and bus repairs and maintenance to other companies in the Kingston area.

== Ontario Northland ==
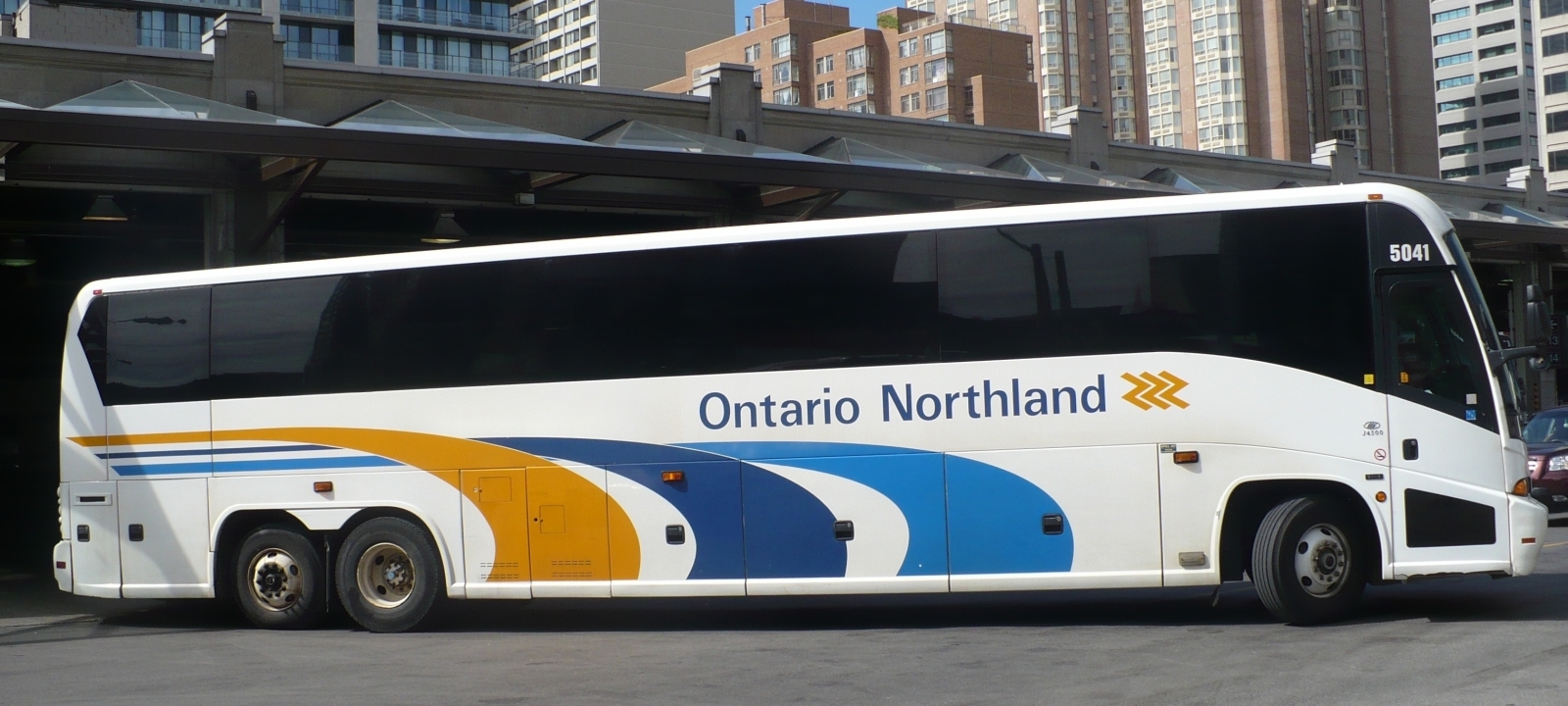

Ontario Northland operates an intercity bus service for the Ontario Northland Transportation Commission, a crown corporation of the provincial government based in North Bay and provide onward connections from Ontario Northland Railway passenger services. The area served is Northern Ontario with routes connecting to Toronto, Ottawa, and Winnipeg.

== Out Here Travel ==
Out Here Travel operates a bus transportation for backpackers and budget travelers to visit places starting generally in Toronto and venturing to other provinces like Nova Scotia and Quebec. The area served goes all the way to Newfoundland. Routes north extend to Algonquin Park.

== Pacific Western ==
Ontario operations of Pacific Western are concentrated in the Toronto area, with a large fleet of charter coaches. The now defunct Toronto Airport Express service between the downtown core and Pearson Airport operated from 1993 until 2014.

== Parkinson ==
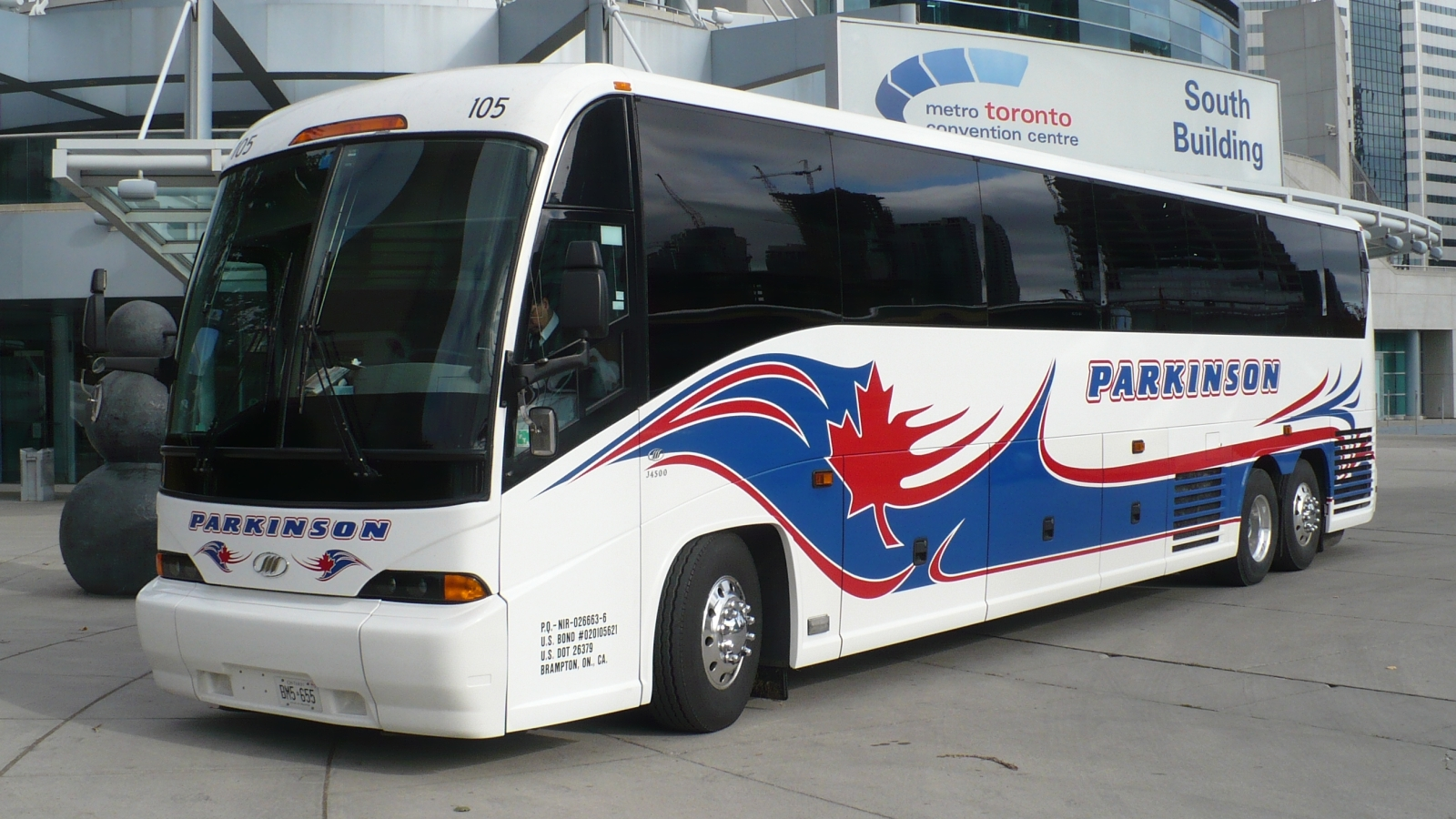

Parkinson Coach Lines was a family business founded in 1946 in Snelgrove, Ontario by Harold Parkinson. The company was acquired by the Murrays in 1953, another family with generations in the bus and coach business back to 1922. The company hasn't strayed far from their roots in Brampton, Ontario and started running the predecessor to Brampton Transit in the 1960s. It further expanded into school buses in the 1960s and coach tours in the 1970s. Today, it has a fleet of 15 exclusively MCI coaches, about 85 school buses and various mini-coaches.

In December 2020, it was announced that Parkinson ceased operations, with Denny's purchasing some of their Coaches.

== South Mountain ==
South Mountain Stagecoach Transit is a tour, charter, and commuter line operator based in South Mountain, Ontario. It runs Route 565 of OC Transpo's Rural Partnership Service. This route connects Ottawa with the North Dundas villages of Inkerman, South Mountain, and Hallville.

== Shuttle Kingston ==
Shuttle Kingston was reported in 2013 to connect Kingston to Watertown, New York and Syracuse, New York.

== Switzer-Carty Transportation Services Inc. ==
Switzer-Carty Transportation is a Coach, School Bus and School Van operator in Ontario. It was founded in 2011 by Jim Switzer and Doug Carty with the acquisition of Parkinson Coach Lines. Since then Switzer-Carty has acquired multiple bus operators.

Mergers and Acquisitions
Date	Company acquired
September 2011	Parkinson Coach Lines 2000 Inc.
June 2014:	C.A. Bailey Limited
August 2021	Dunn The Mover Ltd.
April 2022	DanNel Coach Lines
March 2023	R&L Bus Lines
June 2023	Roxborough Bus Lines**
April 2024	County Bus Services
June 2024	AL Parkhurst Transportation
November 2024:	Robinson Bus Lines

**The Roxborough Bus Lines Family includes: 417 Bus Lines Ltd, Lalonde Bus Line, Matte Bus Line, Larocque Bus Line, Bergeron Bus Lines, Lafleur School Transportation Ltd, Delaney Bus Lines Ltd. and Foley Bus Lines

Switzer-Carty now operates in multiple municipalities and cities with its 16 branches: Toronto, Missisagua, Brampton, Leamington, Oakville, Guelph, Fort Erie, St. Catharines, Bancroft, Alexandria, Avonmore, Clarence-Rockland, Greely, Madoc, Belleville, Casselman

== TOK Coachlines ==
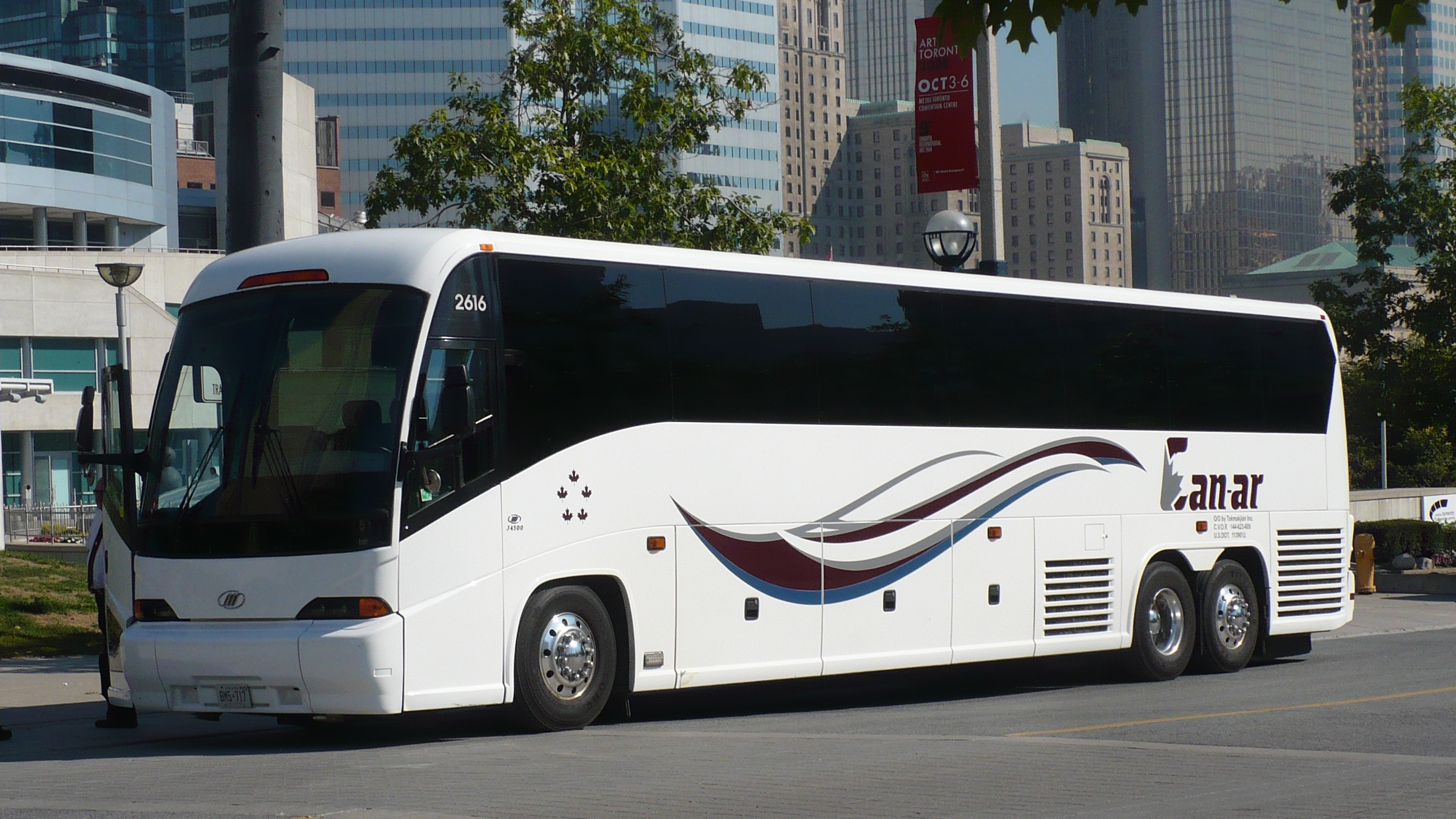

== Tours Coach Ltd. ==
Tours coach is one of the chartered bus service provider for serving customers in Greater Toronto Area. The company is based in Toronto and has a fleet of buses, well-equipped to handle mid-size to large groups (15 to 56 passengers).

== Transport Thom ==
Transport Thom was a charter, tour, and commuter bus operator headquartered in Gatineau, Quebec. It operated three lines as part of OC Transpo's Rural Partner Services, which are now run by Classic Alliance Motorcoach. Route 500 connects Arnprior with Central Ottawa and the government offices in Gatineau. Route 502 connects the villages of Pakenham and Almonte in Mississippi Mills, Ontario, and the town of Carleton Place with Ottawa and Gatineau. Route 503 also terminates in the two city centres, after originating in Perth; the line also serves Innisville in Drummond/North Elmsley and Carleton Place.

== Transtario ==
Transtario is a charter, tour, and school bus operator based in Bradford.

== Transtur ==
Transtur Coach Lines, based in Niagara Falls Ontario, operates luxury coaches and conducts charters from Toronto to Montreal and to the USA.

== Trott Transit ==
Trott Transit was a Canadian owned and operated, full service bus company with its headquarters in Mississauga. Founded in 1976, it is a contractor of regular school bus services, private parent-funded bussing, and public charters. Operations are confined to the province of Ontario, providing regular bussing service to the Peel Region and charter services throughout Ontario including main centres such as Toronto, Kingston, Niagara Falls and London.

Trott Transit is a medium-sized school bus operator operating mainly in the Peel Region. Trott Transit moves approximately 8,000 students per day in its school board bussing programme and 1,200 additional students per day in its parent-funded and private school programme.

Trott Transit provides charter services throughout Ontario, providing over 5,000 charters per year in the Peel Region.

It has been purchased by Switzer-Carty Transportation in 2013.

== Voyageur ==
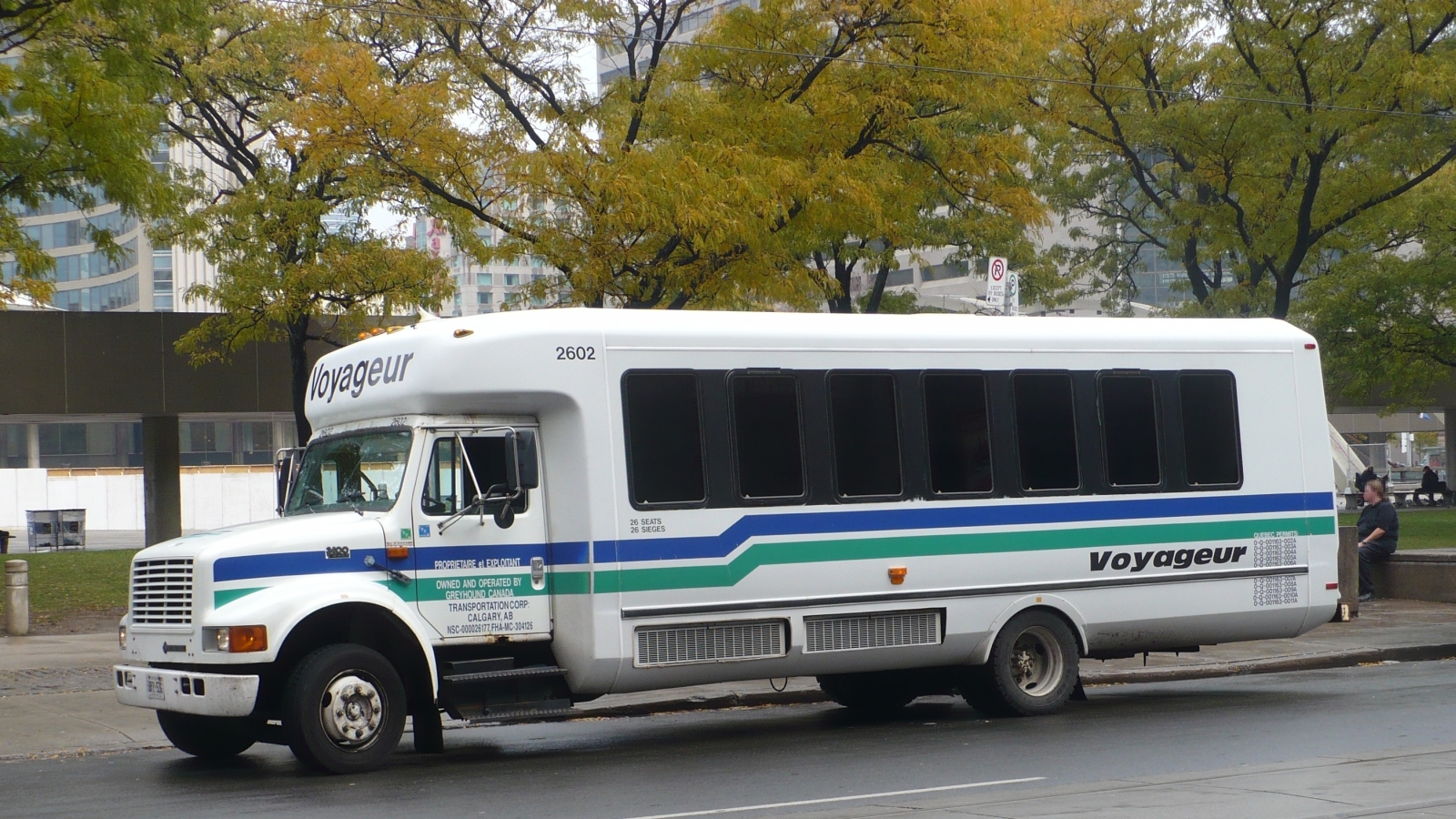

Voyageur Colonial, now branded as just Voyageur, formerly owned by Canada Steamship Lines, was a subsidiary of Greyhound Canada. They provided intercity coach services between Ottawa and Montreal.

== Wills Bus Lines ==
Wills Bus Lines (Motors Ltd), was a school bus, mini-bus and highway coach operator that operated from their office and shop in Binbrook, Ontario from 1921 to 2014. They were the first licensed school bus operator in Ontario, serving Stoney Creek and Hamilton and continuing school bus operations until 2002. The School Bus Division was sold to Sharp Bus Lines and was operated by their sister company, Caledonia Transportation. The transaction saw the Highway Coach Division from Sharps moving to Wills. They kept a number of school buses for their Charter Division.

The Company sold to Badder Bus Lines in 2014.

== Wubs Transit ==
Wubs Transit is a commuter and school bus charter operator based in Winchester. It provides transportation services to the Townships of North Dundas and South Dundas in Eastern Ontario.

Wubs Transit operates a commuter bus service as part of the Rural Partners Service of OC Transpo

Route 541 Chesterville - Ottawa, serving Chesterville, Winchester, Vernon, Metcalfe and Greely.

== See also ==
- Cardinal Transportation
- Laidlaw
- Megabus (North America)
- Stock Transportation
