= Local Motion =

Local Motion may refer to:

- Local Motion (company)
- Local Motion, a brand used by Railway City Transit
