= NorthLink =

NorthLink may refer to:

- Bus companies in Ontario#NorthLink
- NorthLink Ferries, an operator of ferry services between mainland Scotland and Orkney and Shetland
- NorthLink WA, a road construction project in Perth, Australia
