= Collège de la Sainte Famille =

Private Catholic School in Cairo, Egypt

CSF
- Collège de la Sainte Famille

Location
- Cairo; Egypt; 30.0903°N 31.3358°E

Information
- Type: Private Catholic international basic education institution
- Religious affiliation: Roman Catholic (Jesuit)
- Established: 1879; 147 years ago
- Status: Open
- Principal: Father Romani Amin, SJ
- Gender: Boys
- Age range: 5 - 18 years
- Average class size: 20 students
- Language: French; English; Arabic; Spanish
- Campus type: Urban
- Colors: Blue and Gold
- Website: www.jesuitescsf.com

The Collège de la Sainte Famille (English: School of the Holy Family; Arabic: مدرسة العائلة المقدسة), often abbreviated as CSF and referred to as Jésuites, is a private French Catholic international school for boys run by the Near East province of the Society of Jesus in Cairo, Egypt. It was founded in 1879, following a request by Pope Leo XIII for a seminary to help prepare students to become priests.

== History ==
The college began with 16 pupils, in 1879, at the Boghos Palace of Mouski. In 1882 today's college was inaugurated in Faggala. The current Ramses Street was occupied by the Ismailia Canal. The transportation of students was by fiacres. The college had 112 students.

Thereafter was built: the church (1891), the theatre (1892), the current building of Preparatory Cycle (1925), the Primary Cycle in Downtown Cairo (1930), and the Primary Cycle in Heliopolis (1934). In 1930, the college had 600 students from 14 nations: Egypt, France, Lebanon, Syria, Italy, Greece, England, Switzerland, Spain, Yugoslavia, Turkey, Czechoslovakia, Russia, Persia.

== Notable alumni ==
- Boutros Boutros Ghali - Former UN Secretary General and former Egyptian foreign minister
- Prince Abbas Hilmi - member of the Egyptian Royal Family from the Muhammad Ali dynasty
- Mourad Wahba Pasha - Egyptian high court judge and former Cabinet Minister
- Sadek Wahba - Chairman & Managing Partner of I Squared Capital
- Wassef Boutros Ghali Pasha - former Egyptian Minister of Foreign Affairs
- Maximos V Hakim - late Melkite Greek Catholic Patriarch
- Georges Corm - Lebanese economist and former Minister of Finance of Lebanon
- Henri Curiel - left-wing activist and founder of the Democratic Movement for National Liberation
- Gilbert Sinoué - French author and screenwriter
- Monir Fakhri Abdel Nour - former Minister of Tourism
- Magued Osman - former Minister of Communications and Information Technology
- Mohsen Badawi - businessman and founding member of the Canada Egypt Business Council
- Ramy Lakah - Egyptian-French businessman
- Robert Solé - French writer and journalist of Egyptian origin
- Hussein Fahmy - 110m hurdles Egyptian record holder (U20)
- Nagy Habib - Professor of Surgery, Imperial College, London
- Hisham Selim - actor
- Tarek Nour - founder and CEO of Tarek Nour Advertising
- Louis Fattal - Egyptian-French photographer

== Notable faculty ==
- Pierre Teilhard de Chardin - Jesuit, Priest, idealist philosopher, paleontologist and mystic
- James J. Mullooly Ph.D., Professor of Anthropology, California State University, Fresno

== See also ==
- List of Jesuit educational institutions
