= Edi Demaj =

Kosovar-American businessman (born 1985)

- Born: 1985 (age 40–41); Pristina, Kosovo, Yugoslavia
- Education: Oakland University
- Occupation: Businessman
- Known for: Co-founding Rocket Fiber; Co-founding KODE Labs
- Spouse: Ariana Demaj
- Children: 2
- Relatives: Etrit Demaj (brother)
- Website: https://edidemaj.com/

Edi Demaj (born 1985) is a Kosovan-American businessman based in the Detroit metropolitan area. He is best known for being involved in the development of Detroit as technology hub by founding a number of technology companies, including Rocket Fiber, a high speed ISP, and KODE Labs, a company providing cloud-based building automation software.

== Early life and education ==
Demaj was born in Pristina, Kosovo in 1985. His family fled to the United States from the Kosovo war as refugees in 1999 after their home was destroyed by the forces of the Serbia and Montenegro.

During his studies, Demaj worked with his family, which briefly entered the restaurant business before turning to small-scale real estate investment and rentals. He attended high school in Rochester Hills, and completed a BA in Political Science and an AA in Business Management from Oakland University.

Demaj was eventually hired at Detroit real estate management firm Bedrock Real Estate. Bedrock is owned by billionaire Dan Gilbert, who later became an investor in Rocket Fiber, one of Demaj's companies.

== Career ==
While working in the real estate industry, Demaj began to develop software and has since founded a number of companies. He first developed iziSurvey, a software tool designed to facilitate conducting surveys and presenting the results, together with three other Kosovars in 2014. The project began as an internal tool for university professors, but was later offered to commercial researchers as well.

The same year, he secured $31 million in financing from Dan Gilbert to launch Rocket Fiber, a Detroit-based Gigabit ISP. Demaj, along with his co-founders, were motivated to found Rocket Fiber after reading about Google's Fiber Initiative in Kansas City and the economic effects it had on the city. The team envisioned installing gigabit internet as a way to attract more tech entrepreneurs to Detroit and support the local economy.

Service launched in downtown Detroit in 2016. The company has constructed 40 miles of fiber in downtown Detroit, and was acquired by Cleveland-based ISP Everstream in 2020 for an undisclosed sum.

Together with his brother Etrit, Demaj took over management of Reozom in 2016. The company provides a multiple listing service for real estate listings.

Demaj co-founded KODE Labs, a company that provides building automation software, in 2017. The software is cloud-based, as opposed to most building management software, which rely on on-site servers. The name of the company is a reference to Demaj's origin and new residence; KO is short for "Kosovo" and DE for "Detroit." The company was self-funded by Demaj and his brother Etrit until 2022, when it raised an $8 million funding round led by I Squared Capital.

Demaj is a partner in gjirafa.com, the largest Albanian language search engine, e-commerce, and digital media platform.

He is still involved in real estate industry as a developer and investor and is also a co-owner of a restaurant located in the Detroit metropolitan area.

== Personal life ==
Demaj has two sons, Kaon and Orik, with his Kosovo-born wife, Ariana.
