= Adam Fathi =

Tunisian poet, translator, and singer

- Born: 1957 (age 68–69); Tunisia
- Occupations: writer, poet, translator, singer
- Years active: 1982–present

Adam Fathi (Arabic: آدم فتحي), a Tunisian poet, translator, and lyric poet. He was known for his committed poetry style in the 1980s with the "Musical Research" band. In the 1990s, he accompanied the artist Lotfi Bouchnka in his lyrical project, writing the emotional and patriotic song. He translated into Arabic the Baudelaire's memoirs and works by Emil Cioran, Gilbert Sinoue and Naim Kattan. Also, he wrote some songs for several musical bands such as Sheikh Imam "Oh My Son", Musical research Band, and the White Doves Band.

== Career ==
Adam Fathi was born in the village of "Umm al-Samma", which currently belongs to the State of Kebili in Tunisia. He published six collections of poetry. His first publication of poetry collection was titled "Seven Moons of the Castel’s Guardian" in 1982, and he published an audio book with the booklet "The Green Story and Prince Adwan" in 1984. His third collection "The Song of the Fascist Syndication" which was published in 1986 was confiscated right away after its publication. Then, in 1991, he published "Songs for Dust Rose".

He wrote an artistic duet with Lotfi Bouchnak, who sang many of Fathi's poems, including "Sarajevo" and "The Loads of my great hear". He also collaborated with Sheikh Imam. Moreover, the "Musical Research" band sang several poems of Fathi, and the group of "White Doves" sang the poem titled "The Little Sheikh".

Fathi translated several novels and books from French into Arabic, all of which were issued by Al-Jamal publications. He translated Charles Baudelaire’s dairies in his book "The Diaries" in 1999. He translated four works by Emil Cioran "Any of All Water is the Color of Drowning" in 2003, "History and Utopia" in 2010, "The Trouble of Being Born" in 2014 and "Confessions and Curses" in 2018. Fathi also translated two novels of the novelist Gilbert Sinoue which are "Ibn Sina or The Road to Isfahan" in 2006, and "The Blued Board" in 2008. He translated two novels of Naim Kattan, "Farida" in 2006 and "Goodbye to Babylon" in 2012. He also hosted a program called "Book Gallery", in which he hosted several Tunisian writers. In 2019, he won the Sargon Pulse Prize for Poetry and Translation presented by Al-Jamal publishing house in its second session in 2019.

== Awards ==
- Sargon Boulus Prize for Poetry and Translation, 2019.
