= Railway City Transit =

Transit agemncy in Ontario, Canada

- Parent: Environmental Services, City of St. Thomas
- Headquarters: 614 Talbot Street
- Locale: St. Thomas, Ontario
- Service type: Bus service, Paratransit
- Routes: 5 regular
- Operator: Voyageur Transportation
- Website: Official website

Railway City Transit, operating under the brand name LocalMotion, is the public transit system owned by the City of St. Thomas, Ontario. It provides Conventional Transit, OnDemand, and Parallel Transit services and is operated by Voyageur Transportation.

Private companies have provided a variety of transportation services to the city since the introduction of horse-drawn street railways in 1879, which were subsequently electrified and ultimately replaced by buses about 1927. Although the city assumed responsibility for transit in the mid-1960s, these bus services have always been privately operated.

The Transit Operational Centre is located downtown at 614 Talbot Street. The stop for Aboutown's Northlink intercity bus service to London and Owen Sound was relocated to Factory Muffler, 210 Talbot Street. The Northlink service to London was cancelled December 2013.

In November 2020, the city announced a revitalized brand and suite of services for the 150-year-old public transit service. On March 29, 2021, the new service was launched, replacing the former St. Thomas Transit system.

== History ==
- Mid 1960s–1983 – Operated by Charterways Transportation
- 1983–? – Operated by Lewis Bus Lines
- ?–1994–? – Operated by Charterways Transportation
- 2008?–January 2012 – Operated by Aboutown Transportation
- January 2012–March 2021 – Operated by Voyago Transportation
- March 29, 2021 – System rebranded to LocalMotion – Railway City Transit
- October 2021 – A six-month review of the transit system was completed. Following the review, the City of St. Thomas implemented service improvements, including the addition of a weekday peak-period bus and new transit stops.

== Routes ==
Conventional Service Hours: Weekdays from 7:15 am to 5:45 pm, weekends from 9:15 am to 6:45 pm.

Afterhours On-Demand Service Hours: Monday to Friday: 7:15 am - 9:45 pm, Saturday: 9:15 am - 9:45 pm, Sunday: 9:15 am - 5:45 pm

- 1 – Northside
- 2 – Hospital
- 3 – Talbot
- 4 – Parkside
- 5 – Fanshawe

== See also ==
- Public transport in Canada
