= Summit School Services =

US school bus operator

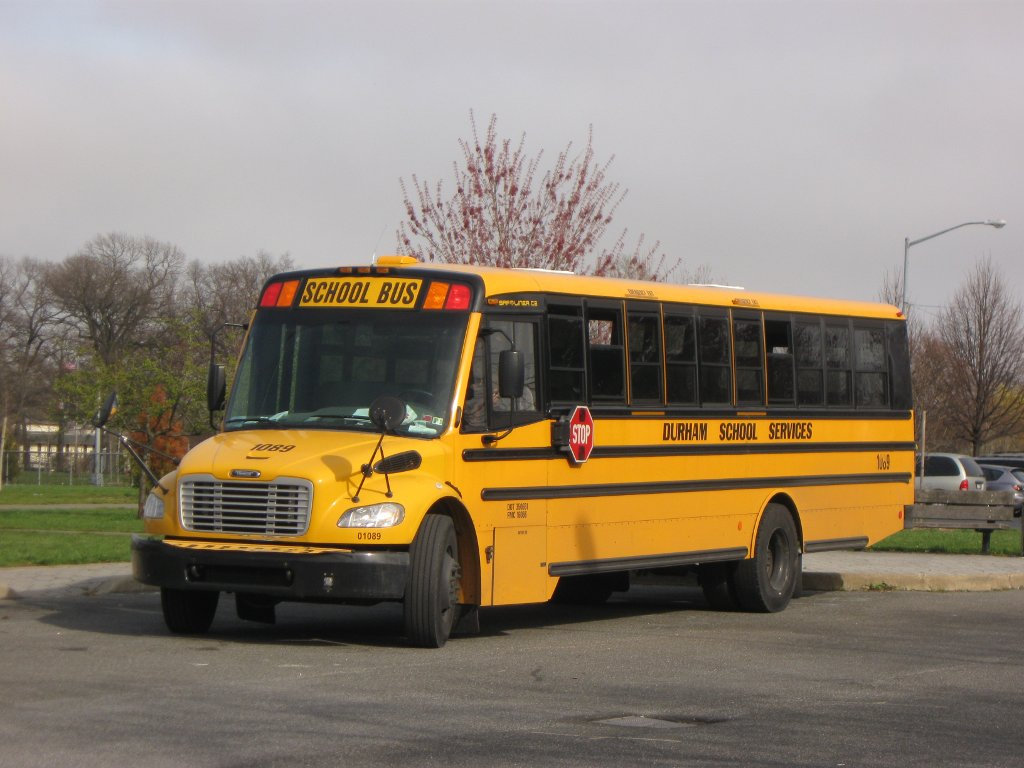
- Conventional yellow school bus
- Parent: I Squared Capital
- Founded: 1917
- Headquarters: 27755 Diehl Road; Warrenville, Illinois
- Service area: 32 states in the United States
- Service type: School bus contractor
- Fleet: 15,500 (September 2020)
- Website: careers.summitllc.com/us/en/home/

Summit School Services (formerly Durham School Services) is a school bus operator providing contracted student transportation throughout the United States, based in Warrenville, Illinois, and currently operating in 32 states. Founded in 1917 with three buses in the San Gabriel Valley, it became a subsidiary of National Express in 1999. In July 2025 it was sold to I Squared Capital.

North American sister companies are Stock Transportation in Canada and Petermann Bus in the Great Lakes region.

As of September 2017, it operated 15,500 buses in 32 states.

== Accidents and incidents ==
=== 2016 Chattanooga, Tennessee ===
On November 21, 2016, a school bus operated by Durham was involved in an accident which left six students dead in Chattanooga, Tennessee. The driver, Johnthony K. Walker was charged with five counts of vehicular homicide. The investigation revealed that though the driver was not intoxicated, he was speeding and had strayed from the assigned route. Walker had been involved in an accident two months prior, and had his drivers license suspended in 2014 for failure to show proof of insurance.

=== 2018 Meriden, Connecticut ===
In January 2018 a Durham School Services school bus crashed into a home in Meriden, Connecticut. There were eleven students on the bus at the time of the crash, no students were injured. The driver of the bus suffered injuries and was transported to Hartford Hospital.

=== 2018 East Haven, Connecticut ===
A Durham school services school bus was carrying the East Haven High School girls volleyball team, when anti freeze spilled in the bus causing it to fill with smoke. Several students were injured and two were transported to the hospital.

=== 2018 Irving, Texas ===
On October 16, 2018, a Durham School bus was on its way to Valley Ranch Elementary in Irving Texas shortly before 7 a.m. when the driver noticed smoke coming from the engine, according to Coppell ISD spokeswoman Amanda Simpson. The driver, "followed protocol" and pulled over, evacuating two students and a monitor on board. Irving Fire Department responded to the scene, and for getting the fire out quickly and ensuring all surrounding the incident were safe.
