= Laidlaw =

American bus company

Laidlaw International, Inc.
- Type: Public
- Traded as: NYSE: LDW
- Industry: Bus transportation, Solid Waste
- Founded: 1924
- Defunct: 2007 Solid waste, 1996
- Fate: Acquisition by FirstGroup Solid waste by Allied Waste Industries
- Successor: First Student and First Student Canada, Allied Waste Industries
- Headquarters: Naperville, Illinois, U.S. Toronto, Ontario, Canada
- Area served: United States, Canada
- Services: Solid Waste, Recycling, School bus, transit, and charter services

Laidlaw (/ˈleɪdˌlɔː/), organized as Laidlaw International, Inc. (with corporate headquarters in Naperville, Illinois) was the largest provider of intercity bus services, contract public transit and paratransit, and contract school bus service in both the United States and Canada. In February 2007, FirstGroup, a bus and rail transportation operator in the United Kingdom with subsidiaries in North America, acquired Laidlaw International, Inc.

FirstGroup completed the acquisition of Laidlaw International on October 1, 2007, and rebranded Laidlaw services under the FirstGroup umbrella. The deal combined North America's two largest private school bus operators—Education Services and First Student Inc.—giving them a combined 40% of the school bus contractor market.

Laidlaw had grown primarily through acquisitions of other companies and contracting of services formerly directly provided by government entities. It was the parent company of Laidlaw Transit (which was merged into First Transit), Laidlaw Education Services (merged into First Student), Greyhound Lines and Greyhound Lines of Canada, and a number of Gray Line Sightseeing franchises in major North American cities. In acquiring Laidlaw, FirstGroup announced that it would not retain the Laidlaw name, but that it would maintain the Greyhound brand.

== History ==
Laidlaw began in 1924 when founder Robert Laidlaw created Laidlaw Transit, a trucking service company in Hagersville, Ontario.

Beginning in 1972, under the leadership of Michael DeGroote, Laidlaw, Inc. began growing through acquisitions of other companies when it acquired a Canadian intercity and charter bus company and then in 1979, a Canadian contract school bus business. In 1983, Laidlaw entered the U.S. school bus transportation sector with its acquisition of ARA Transportation, a major contract school bus provider which also owned a Wayne Corporation bus dealership. In 1984, Laidlaw Inc. exited the trucking business, as the company began consolidating smaller school bus contracting companies in the U.S. and Canada. In 1988, Laidlaw, Inc. purchased a controlling interest in itself from Canadian Pacific Limited, parent of Canadian Pacific Railway.

Instances of reverse privatization were rare, but did occur during Laidlaw's years of expansion. In Virginia, several school districts canceled their school bus contracts with private operators and brought bus operations in-house. By the late 1980s, the only 3 remaining district school bus contracts were at Petersburg, Norfolk and Hopewell. Self-operation conversions for all three were urged by Virginia Department of Education officials as "cost-saving." The contracting companies unsuccessfully disputed the state's financial calculations and cost allocations for the reverse privatizations, which effectively ended all public school bus contracting in Virginia by 1996. In 1991, after losing its major school bus contract in Norfolk, Virginia to a governmental conversion to district-self-operation, Laidlaw sold the rest of its urban-suburban bus line, school bus contracting business serving independent schools and day camps, and related assets in the Norfolk area to Virginia Overland Transportation. Virginia Overland Transportation was an operator of public service transportation and a much smaller industry consolidator in the state. The company had also lost their contract in Petersburg to self-operation in 1989, but was still operating at Hopewell. The latter converted in 1996, and Virginia Overland's parent company based in Richmond closed in 2004. The former Virginia Overland subsidiary operation in the Norfolk area acquired from Laidlaw operates as Transquest and is now owned by Serco. As of 2007, Transquest was continuing bus contract operations transporting students to many independent schools in South Hampton Roads, including Norfolk Academy.

In the 1990s, Laidlaw continued to acquire hundreds of smaller school bus and public transit contractors in the U.S. and Canada. These also included major competitors, including Mayflower Contract Services in 1995, and National Bus Service in 1996. In 1993, Laidlaw acquired San Diego–based MedTrans, a high quality industry leader which began as Harrison Ambulance in San Diego, operating emergency medical services operating in California, Washington, Nevada and Texas, and continued to grow it through 138 acquisitions across the country, reaching over $1 billion in revenue. Glen Roberts was the MedTrans CEO and Donald Jones, COO, at the time of the Laidlaw acquisition. In 1998, the company acquired American Medical Response, another nationwide U.S. ambulance service provider and CareLine, Inc., U.S. ambulance consolidator of smaller ambulance contractors. In 1996, Laidlaw sold its solid waste business to Allied Waste Industries. Allied Waste sold the Canadian operations to USA Waste Services, Inc. Laidlaw American branches were re-branded to many different names, depending on their location. In 1997, Canadian Pacific sold its remaining 17% interest in Laidlaw Inc.

In 1998, a watershed year, Laidlaw Inc. acquired Greyhound Lines U.S. operations, Greyhound Canada, the DAVE Companies (specialists in paratransit) and emergency management companies EmCare and Spectrum Emergency Care.

After incurring heavy losses through its investments in Safety-Kleen and Greyhound Lines and after almost 20 years of expansion, Laidlaw Inc. filed for protection under Chapter 11 of the U.S. Bankruptcy Code in June 2001. Laidlaw International, Inc. listed its common shares on the New York Stock Exchange (Ticker: LI), on February 10, 2004, and emerged from reorganization on June 23, 2003, as the successor to Laidlaw Inc. The company later sold American Medical Response and EmCare, its EMS contract operations, to new owners.

=== Laidlaw Waste Systems ===
In 1969, DeGroote began to expand beyond trucking by acquiring a solid waste management company. In the 1970s, he focused on waste management and other areas, shifting away from the trucking industry, which had a tendency to rise and fall with the economy. In 1978, Laidlaw entered the United States solid waste industry, Laidlaw Waste Systems, a wholly owned subsidiary of Laidlaw Inc. In 1986, Laidlaw acquired Genstar Corp (GSX) of Boston and in 1996 then sold its solid waste business to Allied Waste Industries. Laidlaw sold the Canadian operations to USA Waste Services, Inc. Laidlaw American branches were re-branded to many different names, depending on the location of were they were. After almost 20 years of expansion, Laidlaw Inc. filed for protection under Chapter 11 of the U.S. Bankruptcy Code in June 2001.

== See also ==
- First Student (United States) – successor company
- First Student Canada – successor company
- FirstGroup
- Greyhound Lines
