= France-Soir =

French daily newspaper

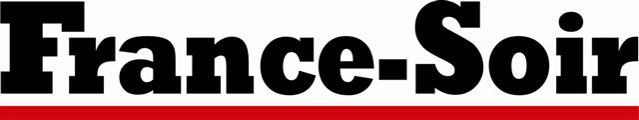
- Type: Online newspaper
- Format: Website
- Owner: Xavier Azalbert
- Founded: 1944; 82 years ago
- Language: French
- Headquarters: Paris
- ISSN: 0182-5860 (print); 1961-9448 (web)
- Website: www.francesoir.fr

France Soir (English: France Evening) was a French newspaper that prospered in physical format during the 1950s and 1960s, reaching a circulation of 1.5 million in the 1950s. It declined rapidly under various owners and was relaunched as a populist tabloid in 2006. However, the company went bankrupt on 23 July 2012, before re-emerging as an online-only media in 2016. In 2020, according to NewsGuard, this media "fails to adhere to several basic journalistic standards".

== History ==
France Soir was founded as the underground paper Défense de la France ("Defense of France") by young resistance leaders, Robert Salmon and Philippe Viannay, in 1941. The first editions were printed on a Rotaprint 3 offset printing machine hidden in the cellars of the Sorbonne. Distributed to Grenoble, Clermont-Ferrand, Lyon and to Britain by the resistance networks Combat and Témoignage chrétien, Défense de la France became the largest circulation newspaper in the underground press, with 450,000 copies per day by January 1944. In March 1944, after multiple relocations, it was housed on three levels of an industrial building on rue Jean-Dolent, behind the La Santé Prison, in Paris's XIVth arrondissement.

After the liberation, Paris-Soir, which with 1.7 million copies in 1936 was the leading French daily between the wars, forfeited its printing plant in Lyon due to its ambiguous behavior under occupation. Pierre Lazareff, its former editor, had returned from the US and joined Défense de la France in September 1944. The first issue of France-Soir - Défense de la France was printed using Paris-Soir's presses on 7 November 1944. The hyphenated name affiliated the old paper with that of the French resistance. The paper's name was truncated to France Soir after World War II.

The paper grew to be ranked among the country's (and the European continent's) most circulated, reaching 1.5 million in 1955 with Pierre Lazareff as chief editor. Its circulation was more than 1.4 million in the late 1950s.

Early in the 21st century, circulation dropped below 90,000. Its circulation was 30,000 copies just before its closure in 2011. In 2013, FranceSoir.fr was relaunched as a digital tablet version for a fee, but met with mixed success.

=== Cartoon controversy ===
In February 2006, Jacques Lefranc, managing director of the news, was dismissed by then owner Raymond Lakah for re-printing the cartoon depictions of Muhammad that were the subject of the "Jyllands-Posten Muhammad cartoons controversy". The twelve cartoons were printed with the addition of another depicting other religious figures sitting on a cloud with the caption reading, "Don't worry Muhammad, we've all been caricatured here".

=== Acquisition by Jean-Pierre Brunois and Olivier Rey ===
In April 2006, the Tribunal of Commerce in Lille announced that the paper would become the property of Jean-Pierre Brunois, a real-estate developer, and Olivier Rey, a former journalist for the paper. The tribunal had been overseeing the bankruptcy and bids for take over since October 2005, at which point the circulation had dropped to around 50,000. The decision lead to strike by the staff who were displeased with Brunois' plan to cut costs by firing many, and increase circulation by turning the paper into a tabloid. One of the opposing bids, favored by the staff, was from Arkadi Gaydamak, the owner of The Moscow News, who had promised not to fire the staff. Due to the turbulence, France Soir was not published for a month and a half.

Brunois brought in bi-lingual British photographer Jason Fraser to lead the tabloid remodelling of the paper.

=== Pugachyov ownership ===
In March 2010, France Soir was acquired by Alexander Pugachyov, son of Russian ex-billionaire Sergey Pugachyov. The paper was relaunched in 2010, but its last print issue appeared on 13 December 2011, with the online version ending in July 2012 with the court-ordered bankruptcy of the company. During the liquidation process, the name France-Soir was then bought by the group Mutualize Corporation SA. which relaunched the newspaper as a 100% online media.

=== Mutualize Corporation ===
Mutualize Corporation SA. relaunched the newspaper as a 100% online media in 2016, reaching a peak audience in 2018. In August 2019, the site staff of four employees went on strike, and were eventually fired, but the website kept publishing content.

== Publishing of conspiracy theories ==
The site has been criticised since 2019 for publishing false information and spreading conspiracy theories

== Notable contributors ==
France-Soir had many contributors, journalists and writers, among them Joseph Kessel, Lucien Bodard, Jean-Paul Sartre, Henri de Turenne, Henri Amouroux, Jean Lacouture, Philippe Labro, Philippe Bouvard, Jacqueline Cartier, Max Gallo, Roger Grenier, Jean Dutourd, Gonzague Saint Bris, Jacques Sternberg and Jean-Pierre Thiollet.
