= Raymond Lakah =

Egyptian businessman

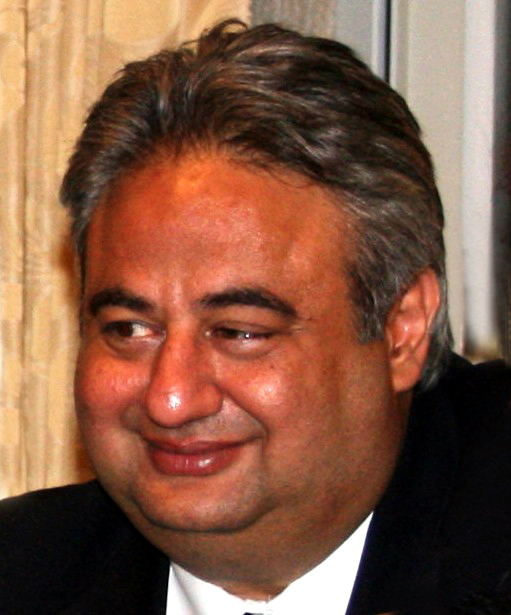
- Born: Rami Lakah
- Occupations: Chairman and CEO LAKAH GROUP Cairo, Egypt

Raymond Lakah, (born c. 1960 as Rami Lakah) (رامي لكح), is a French-Egyptian magnate, and former owner of the French newspaper France Soir.

Lakah was born in Egypt to a Greek Catholic Christian Egyptian family, and first came to prominence with his brother Michel Lakah in the mid-1990s. They had holdings in construction, healthcare management and aviation. In November 1998, their holdings were floated on the Cairo Stock Exchange with Rami owning 38% and Michel 31%. He is an Egyptian nationalist who showed interest in Egypt's political life.

== Egyptian Parliament ==
In November 2000 Lakah was elected to the Egyptian Parliament at the relatively young age of 40. His election raised the question of the legality of dual nationals holding government offices since Lakah was a national of both Egypt and France. In January 2001, the Minister of Interior officially declared that his election in 2000 was invalid. Discussions about his financial debts, which had started before his election, also intensified.

His indebtedness amounting to 1.2 to 1.4 billion Egyptian Pounds with many government bankloans in Egypt unpaid. When lawsuits were filed against him, he fled Egypt and settled in France. In August 2001, a court verdict in Egypt ruled that he could not be a member of the Egyptian Parliament due to his dual nationality. In October 2004, the Egyptian parliament installed a new rule that dual nationals are not allowed to serve in the parliament.

Lakah maintains that all his debts were paid off.

In France, he took the name Raymond, instead of his Arabic birth name Rami, and started establishing himself in several business ventures, including Star Airlines, and in October 2004 he bought the France Soir newspaper.

== Cartoon controversy ==
On February 2, 2006, France-Soir published the Muhammad cartoons that caused a lot of havoc and anger among Muslims around the world. The cartoons were originally published by the Danish newspaper Jyllands-Posten on September 30, 2005. France Soir republished the cartoons under the headline, "Yes, One has the Right to Caricature God."

The same day Raymond Lakah fired the editorial director, Jacques Lefranc. Le Monde reported that Lakah issued a statement saying he fired Lefranc as president and director of the newspaper in "a strong sign of respect to the intimate convictions and beliefs of each individual." The statement continued, "We present our regrets to the Muslim community and to all people who have been shocked or made indignant by this publication."

== See also ==
- Lists of Egyptians
- List of Copts
- Collège de la Sainte Famille
- France Soir
