= Mohsen Badawi =

Egyptian businessman

Mohsen M Badawi
- Mohsen Badawi at the launching of the Abdurrahman Badawi Salon in Cairo, Egypt, April 18, 2005
- Born: November 10, 1956 (age 69); Cairo, Egypt
- Education: Jésuites school Cairo University
- Occupations: Chairman, Abdurrahman Badawi Center for Creativity
- Website: Personal Website: Abdurrahman Badawi Center for Creativity

Mohsen Badawi (Arabic: محسن بدوى; born November 10, 1956, in Cairo, Egypt) is an Egyptian entrepreneur, political activist, and writer.

== Biography ==
Mohsen Badawi went to the Jésuites school in Cairo and graduated from Cairo University. He is the Chairman of Abdurrahman Badawi Center for Creativity since January 2008, the Chairman of Aracom Systems since 1984, co-founder of the Egyptian Soviet Chamber of Commerce (1989), the main founder and first Chairman of the Canada Egypt Business Council "CEBC" (2001–2003), member of the Egyptian Romanian Friendship Association (1988–1991), member of the Arab Scientific Transportation Association (1989-) and a member of The Egyptian International Economic Forum] (2003-). He has been included in the International Who's Who gazette since the 1991/1992 edition.

== Personal life ==
He currently resides in Cairo, Egypt. He is the great-nephew of Abdel Rahman Badawi.

== Published work ==
Mohsen Badawi published his first article in Al Akhbar (Egypt) الأخبار newspaper (1991), published several articles in Sout El-Omma صوت الأمة, Al-Ahram الأهرام, El Fagr الفجر, Al-Mal المال,, Al-Gamaheer الجماهير, Nahdet Masr نهضة مصر, El Karamah الكرامة and Al-Masri Al-Youm المصرى اليوم Egyptian Arabic newspapers. Also he published his first book in 2009 where he collected the political articles wrote by the Egyptian philosopher Abdurrahman Badawi between 1938 and 1967, the book contains 106 articles covering various aspects and periods in the political history of the region and the world starting by World War II, the Egyptian revolution in 1952, Indian politics and political philosophy, the American spirit and unity and many others
