= Tarek Nour Communications =

Not to be confused with Terok Nor

- Company type: Partnership
- Industry: Marketing
- Founded: 1979
- Headquarters: Agouza, Giza, Egypt
- Key people: Tarek Nour (Founder, Chairman, CEO)
- Revenue: $50 mil. - $100 mil.
- Number of employees: 201-500
- Website: tareknour.com

Tarek Nour Communications is a global marketing and communications company headquartered in Giza, Egypt. It is one of the largest advertising agencies in the Middle East.

== History ==
When founded in 1979 by Tarek Nour, the company was the first private advertising agency operating in Egypt.

Tarek Nour, born in 1945 in Cairo, is the Chairman of the Board of Directors of Tarek Nour Telecommunications Company.

== Awards ==
The agency was awarded several awards in recognition of creativity, initiative, excellence, and outstanding contributions in the media and advertising industry.
