= Belle Armstrong Whitney =

American writer

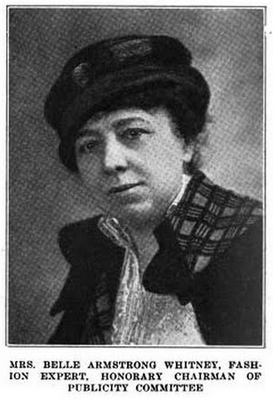
Belle Armstrong Whitney, from a 1918 publication.

Belle Armstrong Whitney (September 27, 1861 – August 1922), who also used the pen name Dinah Sturgis, was an American writer and "fashion expert", based in Paris.

== Early life ==
Belle Armstrong was born in Boston, Massachusetts, the daughter of Thomas Ainsley Armstrong and Sarah Sophia Armstrong.

== Career ==
Whitney lectured and wrote books on fashion, including Suggestions to Dressmakers, and What to Wear: A Book for Women (1916). She discussed the fashion industry's responses to wartime conditions in France during World War I, and to the changing role of women in the 1910s, declaring that "Women now wish to take a more important place in the scheme of modern life, yet they cling to many of their shackles of dress." She especially admired the designs of Mariano Fortuny, for their combination of practicality and artistry. She held a fashion show in New York in 1915, which was considered somewhat risqué; "men in the audience not with their wives" were asked to leave quietly if they wished, before the lingerie portion.

As a director of the Whitney-Richards Galleries in New York, Whitney collected, exhibited and spoke on French poster art during World War I. Whitney was also Foreign Secretary of the Surgical War Dressings committee of the American Red Cross, and lectured in the United States to raise funds for French war relief. She was recognized by the French government for her service, as a knight of the Legion of Honour.

== Personal life ==
Belle Armstrong married Charles Alvano Whitney, a medical doctor, in 1885. They had a son, Lloyd Whitney, born in 1888. Belle Armstrong Whitney was a widow when she died at Meudon in 1922, aged 61 years, from heart disease.
