= First Student =

Largest school bus transportation service

First Student, Inc.
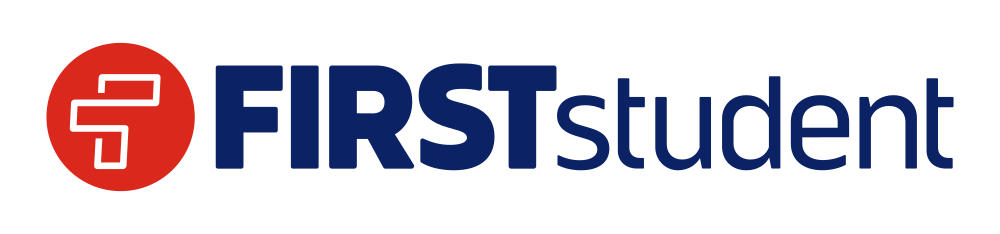

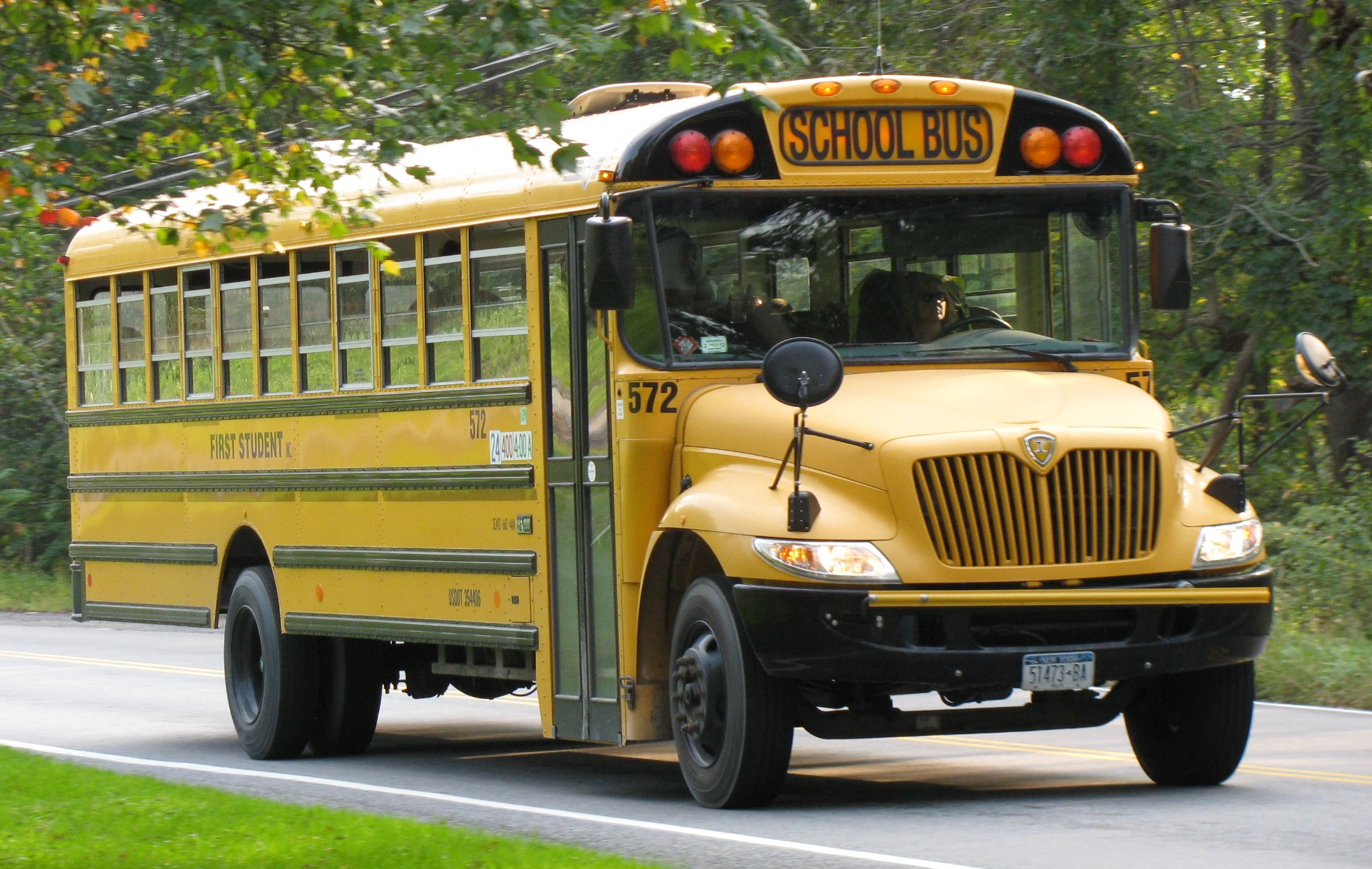
- Formerly: Ryder Public Transportation Services Inc. (1985–1999)
- Parent: EQT AB
- Founded: 1999 (through acquisition of school bus business of Ryder)
- Headquarters: Cincinnati, Ohio
- Service area: United States
- Service type: School bus, charter service
- Fleet: 44,050
- Website: www.firststudentinc.com

First Student, Inc. is a North American provider of school bus services. The company works with districts in 38 states and 7 Canadian provinces, carrying approximately 5 million students daily. In addition to its regular routes, First Student also provides special-needs transportation, field trip services, and charter bus rentals.

With a workforce of 50,500 employees, and a fleet of 44,050 vehicles, the company's fleet of buses drives over 550,000,000 miles combined every year. Formerly a division of FirstGroup, First Student was sold to EQT Infrastructure on 21 July 2021.

== History ==
=== Ryder Public Transportation acquisition ===
In 1999, Ryder sold its school bus division to FirstGroup for $940 million, in order to focus on its truck leasing and rental business.

=== Laidlaw acquisition ===
By 2007, FirstGroup had built the First Student network into one of the largest school bus contractors in the United States; in the same year, the company acquired Laidlaw for $3.4 billion, taking over its school transportation operations as well.

=== FirstGroup breakup ===
Logo until 2022

FirstGroup, the parent company of First Student, announced that it would consider a sale of its North American school bus and transit divisions in December 2019. The North American division was valued at $3.5 billion at the time of the announcement. In April 2021, FirstGroup agreed terms were to sell the business to EQT AB. The deal closed on 22 July 2021.

=== Safety features ===
In 2010, First Student installed Zonar on all 60,000 of its school buses. These features include the EVIR Inspection System for verified pre-trip, post-trip and child-check inspections; the V2J Vehicle Diagnostic Device for tracking and managing assets and real-time transmission of vehicle subsystem data; and Ground Traffic Control, a Web-based data and fleet management application.

== First Student Canada ==
First Student Canada is a major contractor of school bus services and public transit systems. The company provides services in Canada comparable to those delivered by First Student in the United States. The component parts of the operation consist of the former Laidlaw services and subsequent new acquisitions by First Canada.

=== Operating subsidiaries ===
==== Laidlaw ====
Laidlaw Transit Ltd., is a Canadian registered subsidiary which operates former Laidlaw school transportation services throughout Southern Ontario.

==== Farwest Group ====
The Farwest Group of companies provides transportation services in various communities in British Columbia. These companies were acquired by First Canada in 2004 and are contracted to operate public transit services for BC Transit in Victoria, Chilliwack, Kamloops, Kelowna Region and the Central Fraser Valley.

==== Cardinal ====
Several companies branded as "Cardinal" operated school buses in different locations across Canada. In 2005, Firstbus Canada acquired 471136 B.C. Limited and Cardinal Transportation B.C. Inc., Vancouver, British Columbia and Cardinal Coach Lines Limited and Focus Capital Inc., Calgary, Alberta and Cardinal Coach Lines (Ont.) Ltd., North York, Ontario.

==== King Transportation ====
King Transportation Ltd. is a Winnipeg based company that provides school bus transportation, special education transportation services, charter and maintenance services. The company was acquired by FirstBus Canada in 2008.

== Incidents ==
=== 2014 Calgary controversy ===
In February 2014, the company was subject to criticism after it fired Kendra Lindon, a school bus driver after she used her own vehicle to pick up children from her route after her bus failed to start. Due to the extremely low temperature (-26 degrees Celsius), and due to the failure of her dispatch to send replacement buses on the previous day, Lindon decided that "it wouldn’t be right" to leave children out in the cold and feared they might suffer frostbite, since many were not properly dressed for such cold weather. Upon learning of Lindon's actions, the company immediately terminated her employment, on the grounds that it was "against company policy to pick up children in a personal vehicle." Lindon defended her decision, stating that "I was not acting as a bus driver at that point but as a concerned parent...I saw these kids I’ve known since they were five. I was acting as a parent and a concerned neighbor and friend. I couldn’t just drive past them and leave them to freeze."

When contacted by Licia Corbella of Postmedia News, the assistant location and safety manager, Mike Stiles, declined to comment and referred her to the First Student's Cincinnati headquarters, which did not return any calls for an inquiry. Three lawyers, who have offered to represent Ms. Lindon pro bono, have suggested that she may have a case against First Student for wrongful dismissal.

=== Elmbrook Schools ===
In December 2016, a First Student school bus driver assigned to Swanson Elementary School in Brookfield, Wisconsin, was arrested after transporting students while allegedly impaired and carrying a concealed firearm. The incident followed reports of erratic driving from parents and school staff. The driver, Penny Wolf, was subsequently charged with operating while intoxicated and other offenses. In June 2018, a jury convicted Wolf of driving under the influence of drugs and drug possession; she was acquitted of bringing a loaded firearm onto school grounds.
