= Gilbert Sinoué =

Egyptian author and guitarist

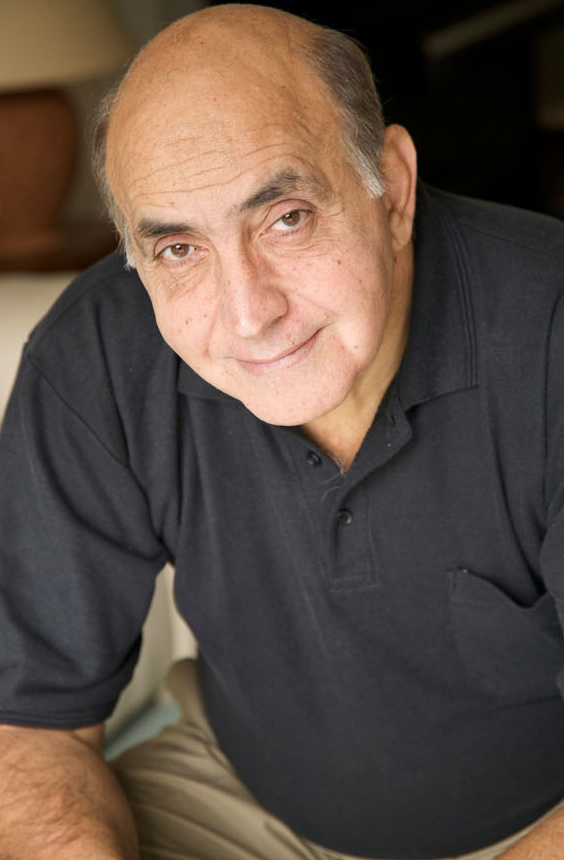
Gilbert Sinoué.

Gilbert Sinoué (born 18 February 1947 in Cairo, Egypt) is a classically trained guitarist and author who has lived in France since the age of 19. He has won major French literary awards for his books, which are written in French. Many of his historical novels have become bestsellers.

== Early life and education ==
At age 19, after studying at a Catholic Jesuit school in Cairo, Sinoué went to France to study at the national music conservatory in Paris. He became skilled in classical guitar. He later taught classical guitar to others and started writing.

== Career ==
In 1987, at about age 40, he published his first novel, La Pourpre et l’olivier, ou Calixte 1er le pape oublié (The Crimson and the Olive Tree, or Calixte I the Forgotten Pope). It earned the Jean d’Heurs prize for best historical novel. In 1989, he published Avicenne ou La route d'Ispahan, relating the life of Avicenna, the Persian doctor, philosopher and scientist.

His novels and other books span a variety of genres. Sinoué's third novel The Egyptian is the first of a saga set in Egypt of the 18th and 19th centuries. Published in 1991, this novel won the literary prize Quartier latin. In the biography L'ambassadrice (2002), Sinoué relates the life of Emma, Lady Hamilton.

In 2004 his thriller Les Silences de Dieu (The Silences of God) won le Grand prix de littérature policière (Grand Prize for Mystery/Detective Literature).

Gilbert Sinoué quickly established himself as an engaging storyteller and master of a variety of genres. His biography, The last phar'aoh, depicts the battle of Mehmet Ali, the pacha, with the Ottoman Empire. In the thriller Le Livre de Saphir (The Sapphire Book), the narrator converses with God.

In addition to writing books, Gilbert Sinoué is a scriptwriter and screenwriter.

== Bibliography ==
- La pourpre et l'olivier (The Crimson and the Olive Tree), novel, 1987
- Avicenne ou la route d'Ispahan (Avicenna or the Road to Ispahan), novel, 1989 - Based on diaries of Abu Ubaid al-Juzjani, the famous pupil of Sheykh
- L'égyptienne (The Egyptian), novel, 1991
- La fille du Nil (The Daughter of the Nile River), novel, 1993
- Le livre de saphir (The Sapphire Book), novel, 1996
- Le dernier pharaon (The Last Pharaoh), biography, 1997
- L'enfant de Bruges (The Child of Bruges), novel 1999
- A mon fils, à l'aube du Troisième Millénaire (To My Son, at the Dawn of the Third Millennium), 2000
- Le livre des sagesses d'Orient (The Book of the Wise Men), 2000
- Des jours et des nuits, (Days and Nights), novel, 2001
- L'ambassadrice (The Ambassadress), biography, 2002
- Akhenaton, le dieu maudit (Akhenaton, the Cursed God), 2003
- Les silences de Dieu (The Silences of God), 2004
- Un bateau pour l'enfer (A Ship for Hell), 2005
- La reine crucifiée (The Crucified Queen), 2005
- Le colonel et l'enfant-roi (The Colonel and the Royal Child), 2006
- Moi, Jésus (I, Jesus), 2007
- La Dame à la Lampe (The Lady of the Lamp), 2008
- Erevan, ou Armenie: Le Grand Roman d'un Peuple (Erevan, or Armenia: Great Novel of a People) 2009
- Le royaume des Deux-Mers (The Kingdom of Two Seas), 2018

(Note: translation of books' titles may not be 100% accurate)
