= Sadek Wahba =

American businessman and policy advocate

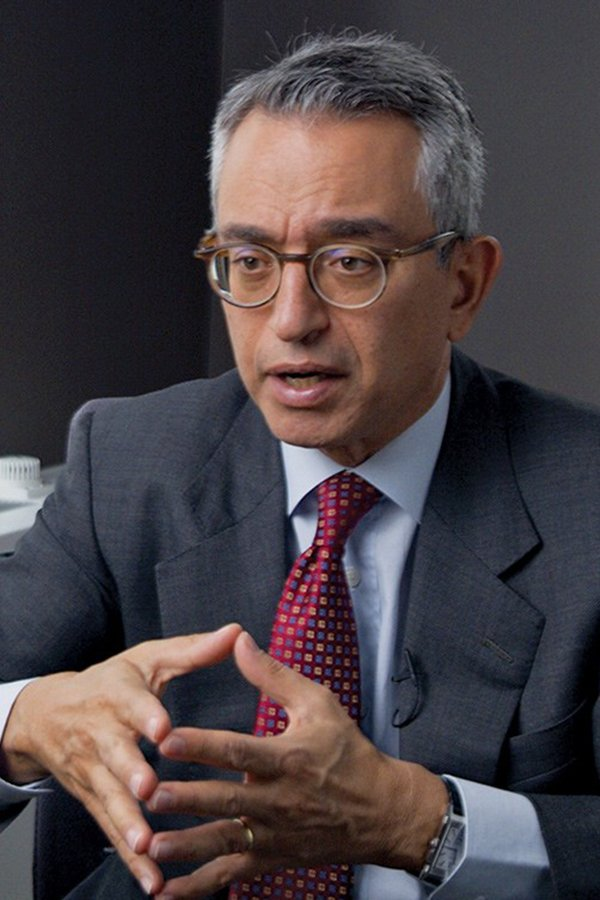
- Born: March 1965 (age 61); Cairo, Egypt
- Education: Harvard University (PhD); London School of Economics (MSc); American University in Cairo
- Occupations: Founder, Chairman, Managing Partner I Squared Capital

Sadek Wahba (born March 1965) is an Egyptian-American economist and businessman. He is the founder and managing partner of the Miami-based global infrastructure investment company I Squared Capital, and the author of Build: Investing in America's Infrastructure. In 2022, he was appointed by President Biden to the President's National Infrastructure Advisory Council.

== Early life and education ==
Wahba is the great-grandson of Egyptian prime minister and jurist Youssef Wahba. His grandfather, Mourad Wahba, was a high court judge.

Wahba was born in Cairo and attended the Collège de la Sainte Famille. He has a Ph.D. in economics from Harvard University. His research at Harvard was on measuring causal inference in social studies. He also holds a M.Sc. in economics from the London School of Economics and a B.A. in economics from the American University in Cairo.

== Career ==
Wahba began his career as an economist for the World Bank, and also worked for the International Monetary Fund before completing his Ph.D. in economics and beginning his work on Wall Street. He joined Lehman Brothers, where he worked on structured financing. In 1998, he joined Morgan Stanley, where he started Morgan Stanley Infrastructure Partners and was Chief Executive Officer of Morgan Stanley Infrastructure. In 2008, his division led a consortium of investors that acquired the rights to roughly 36,000 parking meters in Chicago for $1.16 billion.

In 2012, Wahba formed I Squared Capital, a U.S.-based private equity group that invests in infrastructure projects in the U.S. and in developing economies, particularly China and India. The group manages over $50 billion in assets as of November 2025, including a commitment from the U.S. government's Overseas Private Investment Corporation to invest in Southeast Asia. The firm's assets are focused in the energy, utilities, transport, digital infrastructure and social sectors in the U.S., Europe and in select high-growth economies including China, India and Latin America. I Squared Capital's portfolio companies employ over 66,000 professionals.

Wahba is known as an advocate for increased investment in infrastructure both to address public needs and as a tool to create sustainable economic growth. He argues that infrastructure investment is capable of stimulating economic growth while also providing tangible benefits to the public and the environment. He cites the 2021 Texas power crisis as an example of the "crisis" caused by long-term under-investment in domestic infrastructure and neglect. In addition to tax-funded investment, Wahba proposes additional infrastructure investment sources including pension funds, the creation of an infrastructure IRA, overseas capital and the establishment of a public-private infrastructure bank.

Wahba writes frequently about infrastructure issues. His opinion articles advocate for greater investment in infrastructure and increased use of private investment. He is also a published author on economic research, including articles in the Journal of the American Statistical Association and The Review of Economics and Statistics, as well as other publications and proceedings, in addition to the book Build: Investing in America's Infrastructure. One of his publications was selected by the Massachusetts Institute of Technology as one of its 50 most influential papers in the last 50 years. His research at Harvard included labor migration and worker remittances as a source of foreign capital to emerging markets. He has appeared frequently on Bloomberg, CNBC, Nasdaq, The Hill, Financial Times, Foreign Affairs, Yahoo! Finance, and TD Ameritrade.

In 2022, he was appointed by President Joe Biden to the President's National Infrastructure Advisory Council.

== Awards and honors ==
Wahba is a senior fellow at the Development Research Institute of New York University, a member of the board of trustees of the American University in Cairo, a foundation fellow of St Antony's College at the University of Oxford, a former member of the Brookings Foreign Policy Leadership Council, and was part of the expert committee on the World Economic Forum first report on global infrastructure investments. He is a member of the Council on Foreign Relations, the Global Advisory Council of the Wilson Advisory Center, the board of directors of the Miami Cancer Institute and the Everglades Foundation.

In 2019, Wahba became the only person to receive the "Global Personality of the Year" award from Infrastructure Investor magazine twice and Global Infrastructure Personality of the Decade by Private Equity International (PEI).

In 2023, the Wilson Center announced the Wahba Institute for Strategic Competition, an initiative intended to support policy reforms that strengthen American leadership.
