= Magdi Wahba =

Egyptian professor

- Born: 1925; Alexandria, Egypt
- Died: 1991 (aged 65–66); London, England
- Occupations: University Professor, Johnsonian Scholar, Lexicographer
- Known for: English-Arabic lexicography, translations of Naguib Mahfouz and Taha Hussein
- Title: Undersecretary of State to the Ministry of Culture (Egypt, 1966-1970)

Academic background
- Education: Cairo University, Sorbonne; Exeter College, Oxford University
- Thesis: (1957 (D.Phil.))

Academic work
- Discipline: English Literature, Lexicography
- Sub-discipline: Johnsonian Studies, Comparative Literature
- Institutions: Cairo University, Ministry of Culture (Egypt)

Magdi Wahba (1925–1991) was an Egyptian university professor, Johnsonian scholar, and lexicographer.

He was born in Alexandria in 1925, the son of a high court judge (Mourad Wahba Pasha) and later cabinet minister. His mother had been educated at Cheltenham Ladies' College and Oxford University. The grandson of a Prime Minister (Youssef Wahba Pasha) he belonged to the Egyptian aristocracy of the time but was nonetheless a member of the communist party in his youth. He was a graduate of Cairo University and the Sorbonne where he obtained a diploma in high studies in international law in Paris (1947). He decided to pursue his interests in English literature and went to Exeter College, Oxford University, and received his B.Litt. and D.Phil. in 1957.

During 1957–1966 and 1970–1980 Wahba taught English literature at Cairo University, Egypt. During that time he started the Annual Bulletin of English Studies which later became Cairo Studies in English, published by the Department of English Language and Literature. He continued supervising countless PhD students as an emeritus professor. After his death, the English Department's library at Cairo University was named after him.

He also served for four years between 1966 and 1970 as the undersecretary of state to the Ministry of Culture for Egypt, where he organized in 1967 the Cairo Millennium event to celebrate the millennial anniversary of the city of Cairo. The event is considered by many to be one of the great cultural events in recent Egyptian history. It included scholars from all over the world, including academics such as Bernard Lewis, notwithstanding his sympathies for Israel.

His key contributions to literature include some of the only English translations of Egyptian authors Naguib Mahfouz and Taha Hussein. He also edited existing versions of the authors' works in English. He was a well-known scholar of Samuel Johnson, editing Johnsonian Studies, which included the oft-referenced bibliography of Johnson by James Clifford and Donald Greene. Wahba introduced to the Arabic reader the first Arabic translation of Johnson's Rasselas in 1959 and Chaucer's The Canterbury Tales in 1984. He edited the commemorative lectures for the bicentennial of Samuel Johnson's death celebrated at Oxford University in 1986, published by Longman. In 1989, shortly before his death, he published an article in the Journal of Arabic Literature entitled "An Anger Observed" that summarized the anger and suspicion felt by the Muslim world towards the West. The article was shortly after translated into Arabic and widely seen among Muslim scholars as an example of how it is possible to understand the Muslim viewpoint and develop a dialogue between the Muslim world and the West.

Wahba produced several lexicographic works, including several English–Arabic dictionaries. His Dictionary of Literary Terms, published in 1974 and re-issued several times, has become an important tool for scholars of comparative literature in the Arab world. In 1989 he published Al-Mukhtar: a Concise English–Arabic Dictionary, considered as one of the most thorough dictionaries of its kind. The Mukhtar was followed by An Nafeess, published after his death.

He was elected a member of the Academy of the Arabic Language in Cairo in 1980, as well as a member of the Institut d'Égypte (founded in 1798 by Bonaparte) and became its secretary-general shortly after. He was also an active member of the International Committee for Philosophy and the Social Sciences (CIPSH). While he shied away from political roles (he declined a ministerial position offered by President Sadat), he was a member of the Shura Council (Egyptian Senate), following the footsteps of his father and grandfather Youssef Wahba. He died in London in 1991 from Leukemia.
