= Youssef Wahba =

Prime Minister of Egypt (1919–1920)

Youssef Wahba Pasha GCMG
- ⲓⲱⲥⲏⲫ ⲟⲩⲉϩⲡⲉ ⲡⲁϣⲁ يوسف باشا وهبة
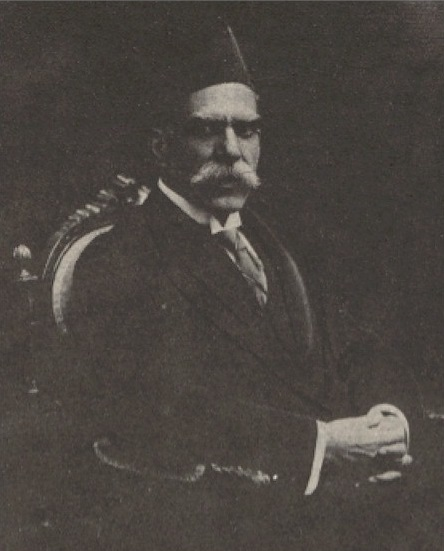
- Wahba in 1914

12th Prime Minister of Egypt
- In office 19 November 1919 – 20 May 1920
- Monarch: Fuad I
- Preceded by: Muhammad Said Pasha
- Succeeded by: Muhammad Tawfiq Nasim Pasha

Personal details
- Born: 1852 Cairo, Egypt
- Died: 1934 (aged 81–82)
- Spouse(s): Doudou, daughter of Mikhail Bey El Nakkadi
- Children: 8, including Mourad Wahba Pasha

Youssef Wahba Pasha GCMG (1852–1934) (Arabic: يوسف باشا وهبة, Coptic: ⲓⲱⲥⲏⲫ ⲟⲩⲉϩⲡⲉ ⲡⲁϣⲁ) was an Egyptian Prime Minister and jurist.

== Biography ==
Youssef Wahba was born in Cairo, Egypt in 1852 of a prominent Coptic family. His father, Wahba Bey had been a founder of the first Coptic charitable society that included Muslim scholars such as Abdallah Nadim and Sheikh Muhammed Abduh. He translated the Code Napoleon into Arabic while at the Ministry of Justice between 1875 and 1882 and participated in setting the modern judicial system in Egypt. He became one of the first Egyptian judges in the Mixed Court of Appeals in 1894.

He became minister of foreign affairs in 1912. Next year he joined the freemason lodge of Egypt. He served as the minister of finance from 15 April 1914 to 21 May 1920. As Minister of Finance, he introduced the first bank notes in Egypt backed by the full faith and credit of the Egyptian Sultanate which bore his signature as Minister of Finance. He became Prime Minister of Egypt in 1919 during a difficult period in Egypt's political life. Many members of the Coptic Christian community to which he belonged, objected to his accepting the premiership on the grounds that it would antagonize the relationship between Muslims and Christians when both were united under the Wafd Party to fight against the British occupation. Youssef always maintained the view that it was critical that a government nominated by the Sultan of Egypt lead the country rather than have the British fully annex it (especially as the victorious powers were carving up the old Ottoman Empire at the Versailles conference). On December 10th 1919, there was an unsuccessful assassination attempt outside the Italian Club in Cairo when a student protestor hurled a bomb and fired a revolver towards him. During his premiership, Youssef Wahba introduced several economic reforms including the removal of price controls on agricultural products, probably a first in the history of Egypt, as well as the creation of the Banque Misr by Talaat Harb Pasha, giving Egypt its first national bank.

He joined the first independent Senate when he was elected from a district in Alexandria in 1924. During his tenure in the Egyptian Senate, he supported various legislation relating to strengthening the independence of the Egyptian judicial system. He also resisted the introduction of any special privileges for minorities in Egypt whether based on ethnicity or religion (including the Christian Copts) first suggested by the Brunyate Commission for Judicial reform in 1917. He retired from the Senate in 1930.

He has two publications on the Commercial Code in Egypt, the first co-authored with Shafik Mansour Bey "Sharh Al Qanun Al Madani" (An Analysis of the Egyptian Civil Code) and the second, co-authored with a fellow Judge from the Mixed Court Abdel Aziz Kahil Bey "Sharh Al Qanun Al Toujari Al Masri (An Analysis of The Egyptican Commercial Code). Youssef Wahba also drafted the constitution of the Majllis Milli, the first Coptic Christian council to manage the affairs of the Coptic community in Egypt in 1882 outside of the control of the Coptic Orthodox Church.

He died in 1934 and was married to Doudou, daughter of Mikhail Bey El Nakkadi and had eight children. Two of his sons Mourad Wahba Pasha (1879–1972) and Sadek Wahba Pasha (1885–1971) had prominent careers in the Egyptian judicial system and the diplomatic service respectively. Youssef Wahba's grandson, Sadek Wahba, is a notable New York City-based managing partner of a private equity firm I Squared Capital and member of the board of trustees of the American University in Cairo.

Political offices
Preceded by Muhammad Said Pasha	Prime Minister of Egypt; 1919–1920	Succeeded by Muhammad Tawfiq Nasim Pasha
