= I Squared Capital =

American private equity firm

- Type: Private
- Industry: Private equity
- Founded: 2012; 14 years ago
- Founders: Sadek Wahba; Adil Rahmathulla; Gautam Bhandari
- Headquarters: Miami, Florida, U.S.
- Key people: Sadek Wahba; (Chairman, Managing partner); Gautam Bhandari; (Managing Partner & Global CIO)
- Products: Infrastructure
- AUM: US$ 60 billion (November 2026)
- Number of employees: 300 (January 2025)
- Website: isquaredcapital.com

I Squared Capital is an American private equity firm focusing on global infrastructure investments. The company invests in energy, utilities, transport and telecom projects in Asia, Europe, and the Americas. As of November 2025, I Squared Capital controls more than $50 billion in assets under management. The firm has offices in Miami, London, Singapore, Sydney, Taipei, New Delhi, Abu Dhabi, Munich, and Sao Paulo.

== History ==
I Squared Capital was founded in 2012 by former senior executives at Morgan Stanley, including Sadek Wahba, Adil Rahmathulla, and Gautam Bhandari. In 2015, the firm closed its first fund, ISQ Global Infrastructure Fund LP, with $3 billion in total commitments with investments from the Rhode Island State Investment Commission, the New Mexico Educational Retirement Board, and Mitsubishi Corporation. As of June 2018, the firm's first fund had delivered 23 percent in gross annualized returns.

Originally headquartered in New York, the firm relocated to Miami in 2018. In September 2018, I Squared Capital also announced the closing of its ISQ Global Infrastructure Fund II after raising US$7 billion, exceeding an initial target for the fund of US$5 billion. In April 2022, I Squared closed on ISQ Global Infrastructure Fund III LP at $15.5 billion.

In December 2023, Blue Owl Capital acquired a greater stake in I Squared by acquiring a portion of co-founder Rahmathulla's stake in the firm. As of November 2025, I Squared Capital has $50 billion in assets under management. As of January 2025, the firm employed 300 people.

== Investments ==
In December 2014, I Squared bought out the Jaipur Mahua Tollways, a 109-kilometer (68 mi) road project on National Highway 11 in Rajasthan, India. In 2014, I Squared partnered with Enduring Hydro to form Cube Hydro Partners. Through Cube Hydro, I Squared made a number of investments in the hydro-electric power industry. In February 2015, the firm acquired 10 run-of-the-river hydroelectricity plants located in Pennsylvania, Virginia and West Virginia, By July 2016, the firm controlled 14 hydroelectric power facilities in the US and, following subsequent acquisitions during this period, operated a total of 19 facilities located on 10 rivers in 5 states.

I Squared has also invested in other sectors of the energy industry. In August 2015, the firm invested US$150 million into Amplus Energy Solutions Private Limited, an Indian rooftop solar power company. In December 2015, I Squared purchased the 220 mi (350 km) pipeline gathering system owned by WPX Energy in the San Juan Basin in New Mexico. The purchase price was reported to be US$285 million. In January 2016, I Squared acquired Lincoln Clean Energy which develops and operates wind farms across North America, including two in Texas. The firm sold Lincoln Clean Energy to Ørsted for $580 million in August 2018.

In March 2016, I Squared bought the Irish power company Viridian for about one billion euros. Viridian provides about 20% of the power to Ireland through gas-fired power stations and wind farms. In October 2016, I Squared Capital agreed to acquire Duke Energy's hydroelectric and natural gas business in Peru, Chile, Ecuador, Guatemala, El Salvador, and Argentina for US$1.2 billion.

I Squared has made a number of investments in telecommunications infrastructure. In August 2017, the firm acquired the fixed-line phone business Hutchison Global Communications from Li Ka-shing's Hutchison Telecommunications for $14.5 billion Hong Kong Dollars ($1.86bn USD). Hutchison Global Communications operates a fiber-optic network that consists of over 1,400,000 km (870,000 mi) of cable and a WiFi network that includes over 25,000 hot-spots.

In October 2020, I Squared agreed to buy the infrastructure division of GTT Communications for US$2.15 billion. The acquisition included the submarine fiber network, data center infrastructure and services of GTT Communications in Europe and North America. In 2021, I Squared spun out of the assets acquired from GTT Communications as EXA Infrastructure, a standalone company based in London which, at the time, controlled 103,000 km (64,000 mi) of fiber optic cable and eight subsea cables, connecting 300 cities and 14 data centers.

In March 2021, I Squared Capital announced that its £2.3 billion ($3.4 billion) joint bid with TDR Capital to acquire the British mobile power company Aggreko was accepted. In May 2023, I Squared acquired Rentco Transport Equipment Rentals, an Australian truck and trailer leading company. In October 2023, I Squared Capital reached a deal with Deutsche Bahn to acquire UK transportation company Arriva. The transaction was completed in June 2024 following ratification of the deal by the European Commission.

In January 2024, I Squared bought 49% of Órigo Energia, which is a Brazilian renewable energy company that builds and operates solar farms near cities.

In July 2025, North American school bus operations Durham School Services and Stock Transportation were purchased from the Mobico Group.

In May 2026, the company announced the purchase of 10 data centers from Cogent Fiber, owned by Cogent Communications, for $225 million.
