= Local Motion (company) =

- Type: Private
- Founded: 2011
- Headquarters: San Mateo, California
- Key people: John Stanfield, CEO & Co-Founder; Clément Gires, Co-Founder
- Parent: Zipcar
- Website: GetLocalMotion.com

Local Motion, Inc. ("Local Motion") is a transportation software and hardware company that builds intelligent networks of shareable vehicles. Founded by John Stanfield and Clément Gires in 2010, the company is based in San Mateo, CA.

== History ==
Co-founders John Stanfield and Clément Gires met at Stanford University in 2010 while pursuing master's degrees. Stanfield previously co-founded two small businesses, Perfect Shine and Veggie Wheels. As his master's thesis project for the Joint Program in Design, he and several classmates designed and built a low-speed electric vehicle, which they called the Weng (short for "Where Everyone Needs to Go"). Gires also had previous experience in vehicle design, having helped to build a 1000 mpg car in France.

After graduation, Stanfield and Gires worked together to build a second low-speed electric vehicle as part of the Lemnos Labs hardware incubator program in San Francisco. The newer version of the Weng was designed to be shareable and interactive as well as energy efficient.

In 2012, the company changed its name from Weng Motors, Inc. to Local Motion, Inc., and switched its focus from designing vehicles to building software and hardware capable of connecting existing vehicles to local transportation networks. In the summer of 2012, the company began targeting fleets on corporate campuses as an initial sales channel, launching pilot networks on several corporate campuses in Silicon Valley.

== Product ==
Local Motion builds software and hardware designed to connect vehicles of all types to local networks. These networks are intended to increase the efficiency and usage of vehicles and facilitate fleet management and ride sharing. Local Motion aims to distinguish itself from competitors by focusing on two-way information flow and interactivity between users and vehicles. Gires defines the company's approach to transportation as providing both "information and service."

The company retrofits existing vehicles with hardware that interacts with users and other vehicles, gathers data about transportation patterns and user behavior, and transmits charge, health and location information back to the central network. The online booking platform lets users view schedules, book reservations and share rides. A separate platform allows fleet managers to monitor the status of vehicles, add or remove vehicles and users, oversee repairs, and resize or redistribute their fleets based on usage patterns.
