= Mourad Wahba =

Egyptian politician and judge (1879–1972)

Mourad Wahba Pasha

Minister of Agriculture
- In office 1937–1938
- Prime Minister: Muhammad Mahmoud Pasha

Minister of Trade and Industry
- In office 1938–1939
- Prime Minister: Muhammad Mahmoud Pasha

Judge of the Court of Cassation of Egypt
- In office 1931–1937

Personal details
- Born: 1879 Cairo, Khedivate of Egypt
- Died: 1972 (aged 92–93) Cairo, Egypt
- Spouse: Victoria Ibrahim
- Children: Magdi Wahba
- Education: College de la Sainte Famille
- Occupation: businessman, judge, politician

Mourad Wahba Pasha (Egyptian Arabic: مراد وهبة باشا; 1879–1972) was an Egyptian politician and high court judge. He served as Vice President of the Court of Cassation, then Egypt's highest court from 1931 to 1937 after which he was appointed Minister of Agriculture in 1937 and Minister of Trade and Industry in 1938. He was then appointed senator from 1939 to 1945. He also served in the Board of Directors of various companies and was a leading figure in Coptic communal affairs.

== Biography ==
Mourad Wahba was born in Cairo, Egypt in 1879, the son of Youssef Wahba Pasha former prime minister of Egypt and grandson of Wahba Bey Youssef founder of the first Coptic charitable society. Wahba was educated in Cairo at the College de la Sainte Famille, a Jesuit School where Pierre Teilhard de Chardin taught for many years. He obtained his law degree from the Sorbonne in Paris and pursued a lifetime career in the Egyptian judicial system, serving as a judge on the Native Court of Appeals and then becoming a counsellor on the first Court of Cassation, the highest court in Egypt, from 1931 to 1937.

He was highly respected and appreciated by all political parties as an objective and unassuming judge that gave much credibility to the new Court of Cassation. One of his most famous opinion pieces was on the subject of the revocation of press censorship imposed by the government of Ismail Sidqi Pasha, then prime minister of Egypt. It is said that he was personally appointed Minister of Agriculture by King Farouk I in 1937 under Muhammad Mahmoud Pasha's Cabinet and in 1938 as Minister of Trade and Industry. Although he was reportedly disappointed by the appointment since it would force him to resign as judge on the Court of Cassation, which as Vice President of the Court, he was expected to lead after the retirement of then-President Abdel Aziz Fahmi Pasha. His appointment as Minister of Agriculture may have been to avoid having a Christian as president of the highest judicial authority in Egypt, a predominantly Muslim country. During his tenure as Minister of Agriculture, he inaugurated the Cairo Agricultural Museum, the largest museum at the time devoted to agriculture since Ancient Egypt.

He was appointed a senator in 1939 until 1945 and played an important role in Coptic communal affairs serving on the Majlis Milli for several years. He was one of the major shareholders of the Compagnie de Ciment Portland in Egypt founded with the Swiss cement group Holderbank as well as a member of the board of directors of Banque Misr and resigned after the 1952 revolution.

He died in Cairo in 1972.

== Personal life ==
He was married to Victoria Ibrahim, daughter of Khalil Ibrahim Pasha, one of the largest landowners in Egypt who had built Our Lady of Zeitoun Church in Cairo, which is believed to be the site of various apparitions of Virgin Mary in the 1960s. He had one child, Magdi Wahba.
