= School bus contractor =

Private company providing transport services to a school

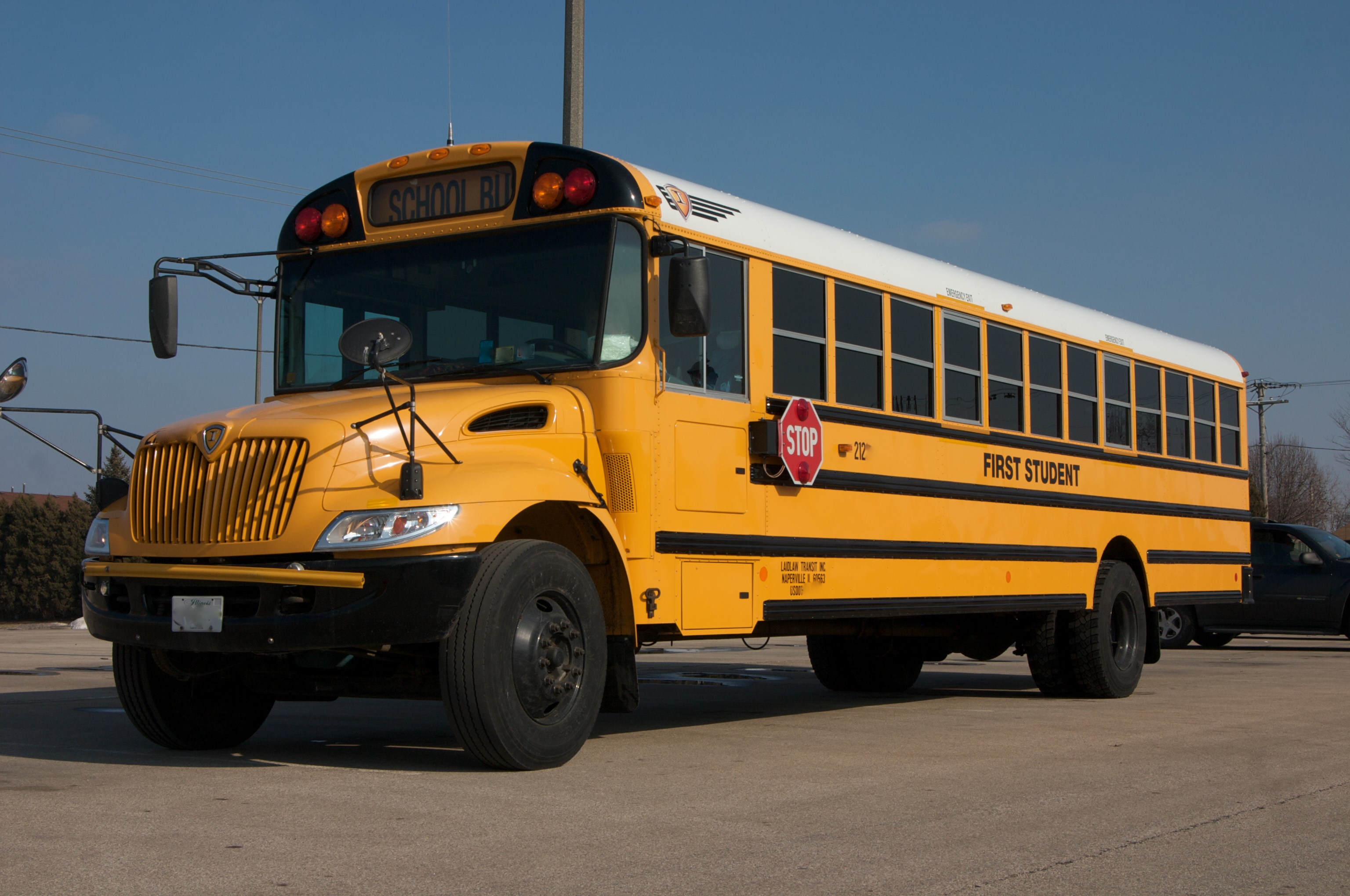
An IC Bus CE series operated by First Student

A school bus contractor is a private company or proprietorship that provides student transport services to a school district or non-public school. Of the 450,000 school buses operating in the United States, it is estimated that approximately 39% are operated by school bus contractors. In Canada (with some still operated by the school boards) and the United Kingdom, almost all school transportation is performed by contractors.

A school bus contractor may range in size from an individual driver with a single bus, to a small company serving a single school or district, to a large multi-national company with as many as 60,000 buses.

Major school bus contractors currently operating in the United States and Canada include First Student, National Express, and Student Transportation Inc.

== See also ==
- School bus (vehicle)
- Student transport (logistics)
- School bus yellow
- Frank W. Cyr
