= Vallican =

- Location of Vallican in British Columbia
- Coordinates: 49°33′59″N 117°39′04″W
- Country: Canada
- Province: British Columbia
- Region: Slocan Valley, West Kootenay
- Regional district: Central Kootenay
- Area codes: 250, 778, 236, & 672
- Highway: off Highway 6

Vallican is an unincorporated community on the west side of the Slocan River in the West Kootenay region of southeastern British Columbia. At the mouth of the Little Slocan River, the locality formerly spanned both sides of the Slocan River. The rural neighbourhood is off BC Highway 6 about 30 kilometres (19 mi) south of Slocan, and 39 kilometres (24 mi) north of Castlegar.

== Name origin ==
Being the old halfway lodging point on the walking trail between Slocan and Nelson, Brown's Hotel (east side of the river) operated during the mining rush of the early 1890s and the Canadian Pacific Railway's (CP) construction of the Columbia and Kootenay Railway (C&K) in the late 1890s. Erected in 1891, the building was one of the first in the Slocan Valley and likely the very first in the lower valley. Known as Barker's Siding in the early 1900s, the identity of the specific Barker is unknown. The revised name of Vallican, presumably deriving from Valley of the Slocan, was first mentioned in 1912.

== Railway ==
The inclusion in the 1913 timetable may have been merely as a designated siding. The stop does not appear on the 1916 or 1919 timetables but is listed in a 1916 newspaper reference and the 1918 Wrigley Directory. This suggests an unofficial flag stop existed during the initial years. The stop was 2.7 kilometres (1.7 mi) northwest of Passmore, and 6.4 kilometres (4.0 mi) southwest of Lebahdo. The final passenger service was in 1959, and the line closed to all traffic in 1993.

Train Timetables (Regular stop or Flag stop)
Year	1929	1932	1935	1939	1943	1948	1953	1955	1958	1960
Ref.										
Type	Flag	Flag	Flag	Flag	Flag	Flag	Flag	Flag	Flag	Nil

== Early community ==
A post office operated 1916–1959. Apart from the first six months, Tom Edgar was postmaster. By 1918, the final link in the patchwork of roads emanating from the various Slocan Valley stations had been completed, creating a passable road via Vallican that linked Slocan and Nelson. A stage service operated at least by the early 1920s. A 1924 map shows trails west of the river indicating some sort of crossing. A sawmill opened in the mid-1920s.

From 1930, Vallican was a stop on the daily Nelson–New Denver Greyhound bus route. In 1933, lightning struck a house, which burned to the ground. A general store opened in the early 1940s.

In 1937, the first 3 kilometres (2 mi) of the Vallican Diversion of the highway north to Appledale was completed. Over the following years, the Vallican–Winlaw section was completed west of the river. Existing for decades, the route indicates a former bridge north of the present Passmore road one. In 1987, roadbuilding at Vallican unearthed Sinixt ancestral remains, leading to the 1989 blockade to protect the burial grounds. A later rebuild kept the highway to the east shore.

The population, which was largely farmers, was about 15 by 1918, 56 by 1929, 60 by 1931, 64 by 1939, 70 by 1943, and 68 by 1946.

== Back-to-the-land movement ==
The back-to-the-land movement began during the late 1960s with new arrivals into the 1980s. The Slocan Valley was the focal point for BC. The various communes flourished 1968–1973. Formed in 1971, the Rural Alternatives Research and Training Society (RARTS) was the umbrella organization that bought 4 hectares (10 acres) at Vallican for the "Vallican Whole" community centre. A $27,000 provincial grant partially funded the work. Completing only the foundations, a hostile local community dubbed the project the "Vallican Hole" and a waste of taxpayers' money. The hippies, US draft dodgers, and deserters, who made up the movement, were considered invaders.

In 1972, a $50,150 grant funded the creation of a community library. The cinema guild, part of the library operation, showed movies every weekend at the Vallican Heritage Hall. Tree planting for the Ministry of Forests provided a viable income base for the community. By winter 1975, the community centre was largely finished. The next year, electricity was connected and the alternative school opened in the fall. Since being established in the fall of 1972, the school had been temporarily accommodated at several locations, but overcrowding had become a problem. After the mid-1970s, RARTS focused upon the school, Valhalla Park, and watershed activism. In 2008, the school moved to Winlaw.

== Later community ==
Notable properties are the Vallican Whole Community Centre and the Sinixt burial ground that has repatriated over 60 sets of human remains since 1989. The Vallican Heritage Hall was the public school building 1930–1968.

The Valhalla Pines Campground & Guest House provides camping, cabin and RV facilities. The West Kootenay Transit System Route 20 stop is at the Passmore Upper/Old roads intersection.
