= Kamloops Transit System =

Bus system in Kamloops, BC, Canada

Kamloops Transit
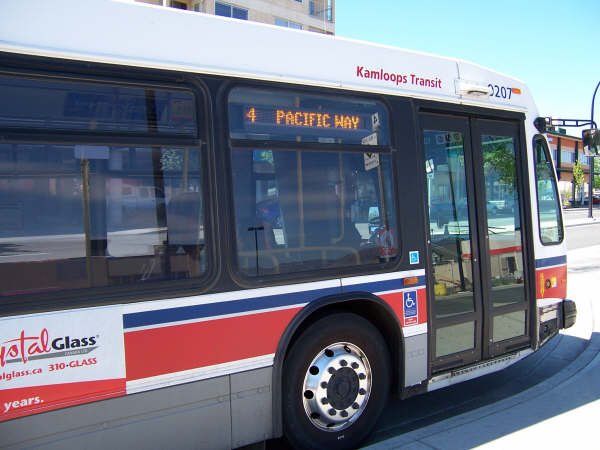
- Founded: 1976
- Service type: bus service, paratransit
- Alliance: BC Transit
- Routes: 15
- Hubs: 3
- Operator: Transdev
- Website: Kamloops Transit

Kamloops Transit operates the public bus transit system in the City of Kamloops in south central British Columbia, Canada. The system consists of 14 regularly scheduled routes, one Sunday route, several school specials and handyDART customized service for those with a disability. Funding is provided through a partnership between the City of Kamloops and BC Transit, the provincial agency which plans and manages municipal transit systems. Operations are contracted out to Transdev. The transit system began development in 1975 after the Province of British Columbia began offering subsidies to help operate local transit systems in local communities.

== Regional Connections ==
The Kamloops Transit System primarily serves the city centre and immediate surroundings, though bus services are provided to Rayleigh and Heffley Creek, 13km and 20km distant from the city centre respectively. Transit connections to the Clearwater Transit System to Vinsulla, McLure, Barriere, Darfield, Little Fort, Blackpool, Clearwater, and Vavenby are offered twice weekly.

== BC Transit Health Connections ==
Kamloops is part of the Health Connections network operated by BC Transit. These are intercity connections geared towards those in smaller communities needing access to larger health facilities, though all members of the public are welcome to use them if space is available. These services operate infrequently. Communities connected by these services directly to Kamloops are as follow:

- Ashcroft
- Cache Creek
- Chase
- Fountain Flats
- Kelowna
- Lillooet
- Lytton
- Logan Lake
- Merritt
- Pritchard
- Revelstoke
- Salmon Arm
- Savona
- Sicamous
- Sorrento
- Spences Bridge

== City Bus Routes ==
Colours use original routes. School Special routes don't use colour routes.

Kamloops Transit City Bus System
Route number	Route name	Origin	Destination/back point	Neighbourhoods served
1	Tranquille	Lansdowne Exchange	Tranquille Road	North Shore
2	Parkcrest	Lansdowne Exchange	Brocklehurst	North Shore
3	Westsyde	Lansdowne Exchange	Harrington Road	Westmount
4	Pacific Way	TRU Exchange	Aberdeen	Southgate
5	Pineview	TRU Exchange	Pineview	Dufferin
6	Downtown Loop	Lansdowne Exchange	Fraser St.	Sagebrush
7	Aberdeen	Lansdowne Exchange	Aberdeen	West End/Lower Sahali
9	Gleneagles	Lansdowne Exchange	Sahali	Upper Sahali
10	North Shore-TRU Express	North Shore Exchange	TRU Exchange	North Shore
13	Yellowhead	North Shore Exchange	Heffley Creek	Rayleigh
14	Batchelor Heights	North Shore Exchange	Batchelor Heights	North Shore
16	Juniper Ridge	Lansdowne Exchange	Juniper Ridge	Valleyview
17	Dallas	Lansdowne Exchange	BC Wildlife Park	Valleyview, Barnhartvale
18	Mt. Paul	Lansdowne Exchange	Mt. Paul Industrial	Sun Rivers
70	Pacific Way	Munro Street	Pacific Way	Aberdeen, West End
71	Sahali Express	Pacific Way	Summit Drive	Aberdeen, Lower Sahali
72	South Kamloops	Pacific Way	Fraser Street	Aberdeen, West End, Sagebrush
73	South Kamloops/Aberdeen	Rogers Way	Fraser Street	Aberdeen, West End, Sagebrush
74	Pacific Way	Summit Drive	Pacific Way	Aberdeen, Lower Sahali
75	Sahali Secondary	Whistler Drive	Summit Drive	Upper Sahali
76	Lansdowne	Fraser Street	Lansdowne Exchange	Sagebrush
77	Aberdeen	Munro Street	Hugh Allan Drive	Aberdeen, Upper Sahali, Lower Sahali
78	SKS Express	Lansdowne Exchange	Fraser Street	Sagebrush, Kamloops
79	Sahali/Aberdeen	South Sahali Elementary	Hugh Allan Drive	Aberdeen, Upper Sahali
80	Batchelor Heights	Westsyde Road	Batchelor Drive	Batchelor Heights
81	Westsyde/Batchelor Heights	Westsyde Road	North Shore Exchange	Westsyde, Batchelor Heights
