= Cowichan Valley Regional Transit System =

Public bus service in British Columbia, Canada

- 9300 Nova LFS Suburban on route 99 'Shawnigan Lake' on Trans Canada Highway at Helmcken Road.
- Parent: BC Transit
- Founded: 1987
- Headquarters: 5280 Polkey Road; Duncan, British Columbia
- Service area: Cowichan Valley
- Service type: Bus, Paratransit
- Alliance: BC Transit
- Routes: 15
- Hubs: Village Green Mall
- Fleet: 34
- Fuel type: Diesel
- Operator: Transdev
- Website: Cowichan Valley Regional Transit System

Cowichan Valley Regional Transit System is a public bus service in Duncan and the Cowichan Valley of British Columbia, Canada. The conventional transit of the Cowichan Valley Transit System has been in service since 1993. handyDART is a transportation service for people with a disability or seniors who are unable to use conventional transit, which is operated by Volunteer Cowichan.

== Services ==
There is weekday commuter service between Duncan, Cobble Hill, Mill Bay, Shawnigan Lake, and Victoria. Buses leave the Cowichan Valley in the morning and return in the evening. They travel via the Malahat. Funding for the service, which started operating on October 20, 2008 is provided by Cowichan Valley Regional District, Victoria Regional Transit and BC Transit. Service between Duncan, Ladysmith, Oyster Bay, and Nanaimo along Hwy 1 is operated by RDN Transit.

== Routes ==
=== Regional routes ===
No.	Route	Termini	Notes
2	Mt. Prevost	Cowichan Commons-Village Green Mall via Cowichan District Hospital	
3	Quamichan	Cowichan Commons-Village Green Mall via Duncan Westside	
4	Maple Bay	Maple Bay-Village Green Mall	
5	Eagle Heights	starts and ends at Village Green Mall. Travels via Cowichan 1 Reserve, and Eagle Heights and Koksilah areas.	Runs on weekdays.
6	Crofton/Chemainus	Chemainus-Village Green Mall. 6A travels from Crofton Rd to Henry Rd along Chemainus Rd. 6B travels from Crofton Rd to Henry Rd along Mt. Sicker and Hwy 1.	
7	Cowichan Lake	Lake Cowichan Town Centre-Village Green Mall via Gibbins	
7X	Cowichan Lake Express	Lake Cowichan Town Centre-Village Green Mall via Hwy 18. Some runs of 7 and 7X travel further along South Shore Rd and then into residential south Lake Cowichan.	Weekday service.
8	Mill Bay via Telegraph Road / Duncan via Shawnigan Lake	Village Green Mall - Mill Bay	Stops at BC Ferries Mill Bay terminal.
9	Mill Bay via Shawnigan Lake / Duncan via Telegraph Road	Village Green Mall - Mill Bay	
20	Youbou Connector	Lake Cowichan-Youbou	Runs daily except Sunday.
21	Honeymoon Bay Connector	Lake Cowichan-Gordon Bay Provincial Park	Runs daily except Sunday.
31	Alderwood-Ladysmith	Starts and ends at 1st & Symonds in Ladysmith. Travels through Downtown and through western and northern portions of the town.	Runs daily except Sunday.
34	Ladysmith-Chemainus	Ladysmith-Chemainus	Runs daily except Sunday.
36	Ladysmith-Duncan Express	Ladysmith-Village Green Mall	Runs daily except Sunday.

=== Commuter routes ===
No.	Route	Termini	Notes
66 CVX	Cowichan-Victoria Express	Village Green Mall-Downtown Victoria	Runs daily except Sunday. Former Saturday service (Route 44) merged into 66 in 2023.
99 SVX	Shawnigan Lake-Victoria Express	Cobble Hill Park & Ride-Downtown Victoria	Weekday peak service.
