= Comox Valley Transit System =

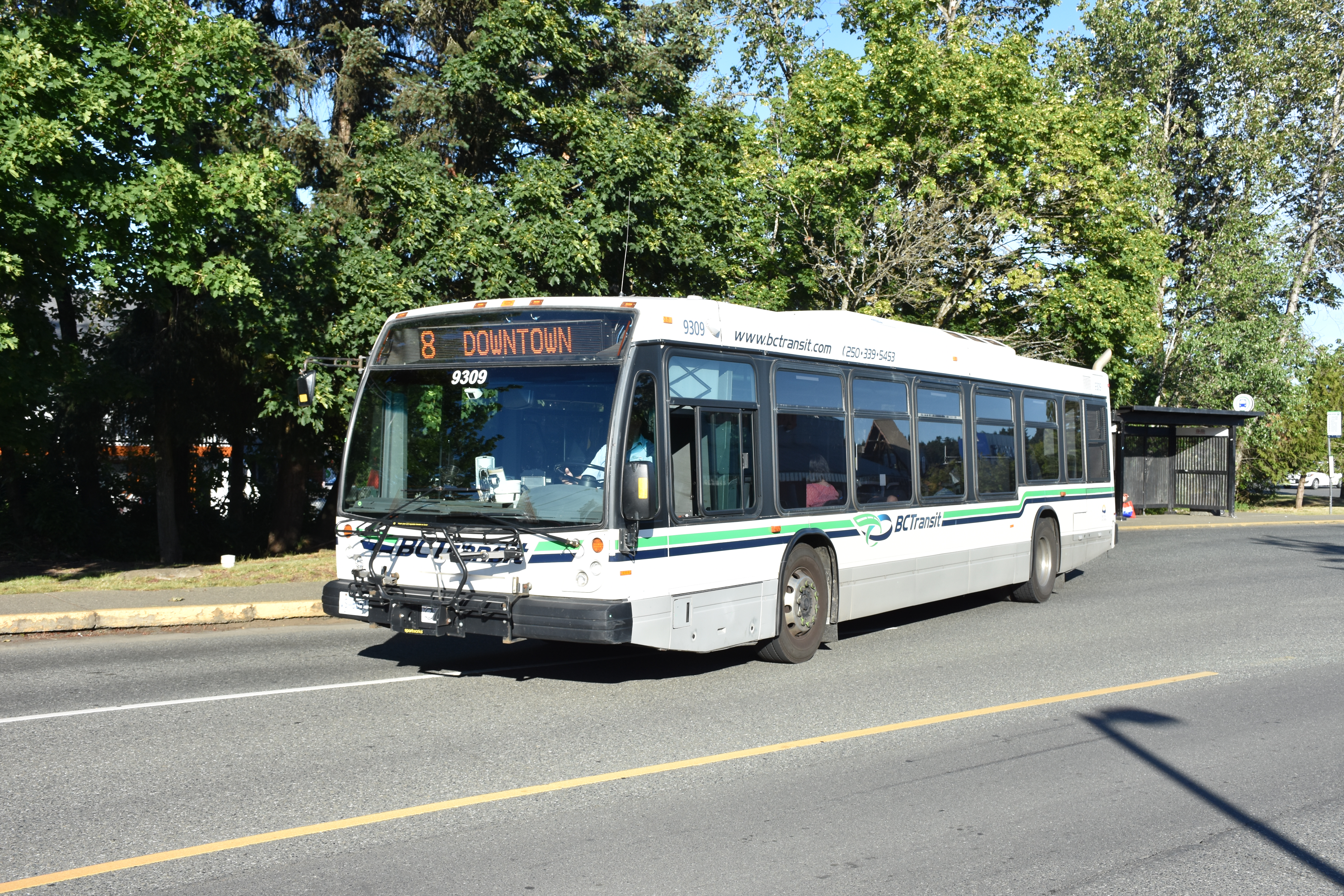
- On route 8 'Downtown via Willemar' at Driftwood Mall Exchange.
- Headquarters: 1635 Knight Road, Comox
- Service area: Comox Valley
- Service type: Transit bus, Paratransit
- Alliance: BC Transit
- Routes: 16
- Destinations: Cumberland, Courteney, Comox
- Hubs: Downtown Courtenay, NIC, Comox Mall, Driftwood Mall, Anfield Centre, Comox Valley Sports CTR and GP Vanier
- Fleet: 18 in Conventional fleet, 1 in Community Bus fleet, 8 in Paratransit fleet
- Fuel type: Diesel for Conventional fleet, gas for Community Bus plus Paratransit fleet
- Operator: Keolis Canada
- Website: Comox Valley Transit System

Comox Valley Transit System provides public transportation in the Comox Valley area on the east coast of Vancouver Island, British Columbia, Canada. Service is provided to the City of Courtenay and the towns of Comox, Royston, Oyster River, Black Creek, and Cumberland. Funding is provided under a partnership between the Comox Valley Regional District and BC Transit, the provincial agency which plans and manages municipal transit systems.

== Routes ==
All routes are centered on Courtenay, radiating to the other communities in the area.

No.	Route	Notes
1	Comox Mall/Anfield Centre	Frequent Transit Service (every 20 min during peak times) Stops at Comox Mall, NIC, Downtown, Driftwood Mall and Anfield Centre and back again
2	Cumberland/Anfield Centre	Downtown to Anfield Centre, then to Cumberland and return.
3	Comox local	clockwise loop through Comox
4	Driftwood Mall/Comox Mall	goes from Driftwood Mall to Comox Mall through Comox Rd and 17th St Bridge.
5	Vanier	Weekday peak service, plus one bus in each direction on Saturdays.
6	Uplands	Downtown to eastern Courtenay (including North Island College) and return.
7	Arden	No Sunday service.
8	Downtown/Anfield Centre	goes from Anfield Centre to Driftwood Mall then continues onto Willimar and into Downtown Courtenay
10	Fanny Bay/Downtown Courtenay	Downtown to Driftwood Mall, Royston, the BC Ferries terminal at Buckley Bay, Deep Bay, and return. Twice-a-day connection to Nanaimo Regional Transit now available daily except Sundays.
11	Airport (Via Little River)/Downtown	Downtown to North Island College, Comox Airport, and BC Ferries terminal at Little River and return. No Sunday service.
12	Oyster River/ Downtown	Courtenay to Merville, Black Creek and Oyster River with transfers to Campbell River Transit. No Sunday service.
13	Merville-Seal Bay Shuttle	Tuesday and Thursday Service
14	Union Bay Shuttle	Tuesday and Thursday Service
15	Comox Mall (Via Back Rd.)/ Aquatic Centre (Via Back Rd.)	The newest route in the transit system: goes from Comox Mall onto Back Rd and to the NIC/Aquatic center exchange and back again.
20	Cumberland (Via Royston)	Goes from Anfield Centre into Royston and connects into Cumberland, then turns into #2.
99	Veteran's Memorial Parkway Connector	Morning service to schools and afternoon service from schools.

== Operations ==
=== Fleet ===
- ARBOC Freedom
- New Flyer Industries D40LF (Retired)
- Alexander Dennis Pointer (30 ft and 35 ft)
- Grande West Vicinity (30 ft and 35 ft)
- Nova Bus LFS

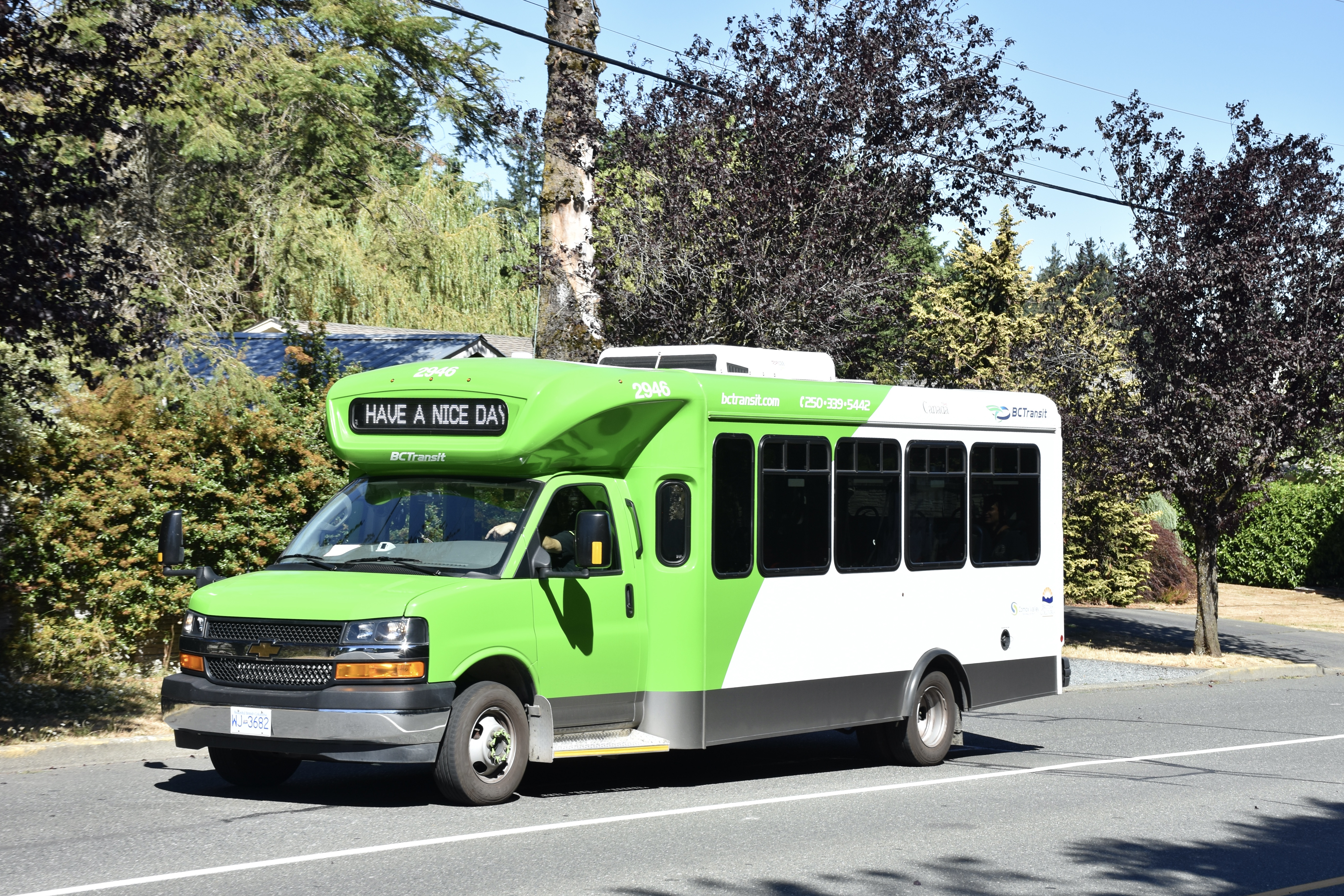
An ARBOCFreedom operating on HandyDart service in Comox Valley
