= Winlaw =

- Location of Winlaw in British Columbia
- Coordinates: 49°36′59″N 117°34′04″W
- Country: Canada
- Province: British Columbia
- Region: Slocan Valley, West Kootenay
- Regional district: Central Kootenay
- Area codes: 250, 778, 236, & 672
- Highway: Highway 6

Winlaw is an unincorporated community adjacent to Winlaw Creek (commonly called Cedar Creek) on the east side of the Slocan River in the West Kootenay region of southeastern British Columbia. The locality is on BC Highway 6 about 20 kilometres (12 mi) south of Slocan, and 49 kilometres (30 mi) north of Castlegar.

== Name origin ==
Initially called Winlaws or Winlaw's Siding, John Brown Winlaw relocated his portable sawmill from Lemon Creek. The earliest mention of the place, which comprised little more than a boxcar for a section crew, was in 1900.

== Railway ==
The Canadian Pacific Railway (CP) added this Columbia and Kootenay Railway (C&K) siding to the timetable in 1902. In February 1903, a brakeman sustained fatal injuries after falling under the wheels of a slowing passenger car. Two months later, a mudslide some distance north pushed a passenger car and the track into the river. A week later, two miles north of Winlaw, a loosened rail derailed four loaded freight cars of a mixed train, causing the fourth wreck in two weeks in that vicinity. A year later, a succession of mudslides created a four-day closure and initially took out 91 metres (300 ft) of track. In 1905, a passenger train derailed.

The erection of a section house in 1918 suggests a section crew was not permanently based prior to this time. In 1927, three railway cars derailed.

The stop was 3.2 kilometres (2.0 mi) northeast of Lebahdo and 8.2 kilometres (5.1 mi) southwest of Perrys.

The final passenger service was in 1959, and the line closed to all traffic in 1993.

Train Timetables (Regular stop or Flag stop)
Year	1905	1909	1912	1916	1919	1929	1932	1935	1939	1943	1948	1953	1955	1958	1960
Ref.															
Type	Flag	Flag	Flag	Flag	Flag	Regular	Regular	Regular	Regular	Regular	Regular	Regular	Regular	Regular	Nil

Winlaw lies on the Slocan Valley Rail Trail.

== Forestry ==
In 1900, the Winlaw sawmill began operations. A 1904 fire destroyed thousands of dollars' worth of company logs. Enhancements over the years developed into a 13,716-metre (45,000 ft) daily capacity mill, employing about 40 workers, plus 50 loggers. This was one of the few mills that operated through the winter. In 1911, J.B. Winlaw bought another mill at Duck Creek (Wynndel ), intending to transfer some of the machinery from his Winlaw operation. The next year, fire completely destroyed his original mill, but the timber in the yard was spared. In 1914, a further fire razed the rebuilt sawmill, and milling operations appear to have ceased at this time.

A claim that the mill once stood at the site of the present elementary school seems suspect. BC interior sawmills were mostly erected between a river and railway line. Prior to modern road transport, raw logs arrived via river and finished lumber left via rail. The school site was bought in 1920 from G.A. Hird, a rancher.

== Early community ==
Unable to secure a teacher for the 1902–03 year, the school opened the following year. J.B. Winlaw was the inaugural postmaster 1903–1916.

In 1910, a new bridge was built across the river. In 1913, a new wagon road northeast to Perry's Siding was completed. In 1916, a new wagon road southwest to Lebahdo was under construction.

By 1918, a general store existed. In early 1923, a new one-room school building was completed. The next year, a garage opened.

From 1930, Winlaw was a stop on the daily Nelson–New Denver Greyhound bus route.

The population, which was largely farmers, was about 180 by 1918, 258 by 1927, and 304 by 1943.

== Doukhobors ==
In 1916, the Doukhobors established a brick factory immediately to the north, which was soon abandoned because the clay proved unsuitable. Called Kirpichnoye (brickworks in Russian) or Claybrick officially, the rural community had become part of Winlaw by the 1960s.

== Freedomites ==
Various incidents linked to the Freedomites:
1947: Attempted arson of school.
1952: Fire razed general store and residence.
1953: Fire consumed two buildings and three residences.
1961: Winlaw hall, a residence, and an automobile torched.
1962: CP track dynamited and fire destroyed over 30 residences.

== Back-to-the-land movement ==
The back-to-the-land movement began during the late 1960s with new arrivals into the 1980s. The Slocan Valley was the focal point for BC. The various communes flourished 1968–1973. The New Family formed a commune on timbered land above Winlaw, buying 16 hectares (40 acres) in 1968 and 65 hectares (160 acres) the following spring. They created the Paradise Valley Nursery. Ventures by other individuals included Robert's Restaurant south of Winlaw, a meeting place for the alternative community that served natural foods. A community cemetery was established. In 1982, the Slocan Valley Watershed Alliance was founded, which sponsored the FLOW (For Love of Water) conference in 1984. Watershed activists from all over the province attended the Winlaw event. In 2008, the alternative school relocated from Vallican.

== Later community ==
Services include a grocery store/gas bar/post office, a bakery/cafe, herbal apothecary, an organic food market, three licensed restaurants, and a golf course. Karibu Park Cottages & Campground offers visitor accommodation. Other amenities are a hardware store, Vallican Whole School (private), Winlaw Elementary School, a fire department, and an ambulance station. In 2016, the elementary school was threatened with closure. The West Kootenay Transit System Route 20 stop is at Winlaw bridge. The census population was 310 in 2021, 297 in 2016, 294 in 2011, and 288 in 2006.

== Notable people ==
- Lou Lynn, sculptor and a 2021 winner of a Governor General's Award in Visual and Media Arts.
- Warren Macdonald, mountain climber
- Liev Schreiber, actor/director
- Pablo Schreiber, actor
