= Blink RapidBus =

Bus rapid transit line

95 Langford/Downtown RapidBus
- RapidBus
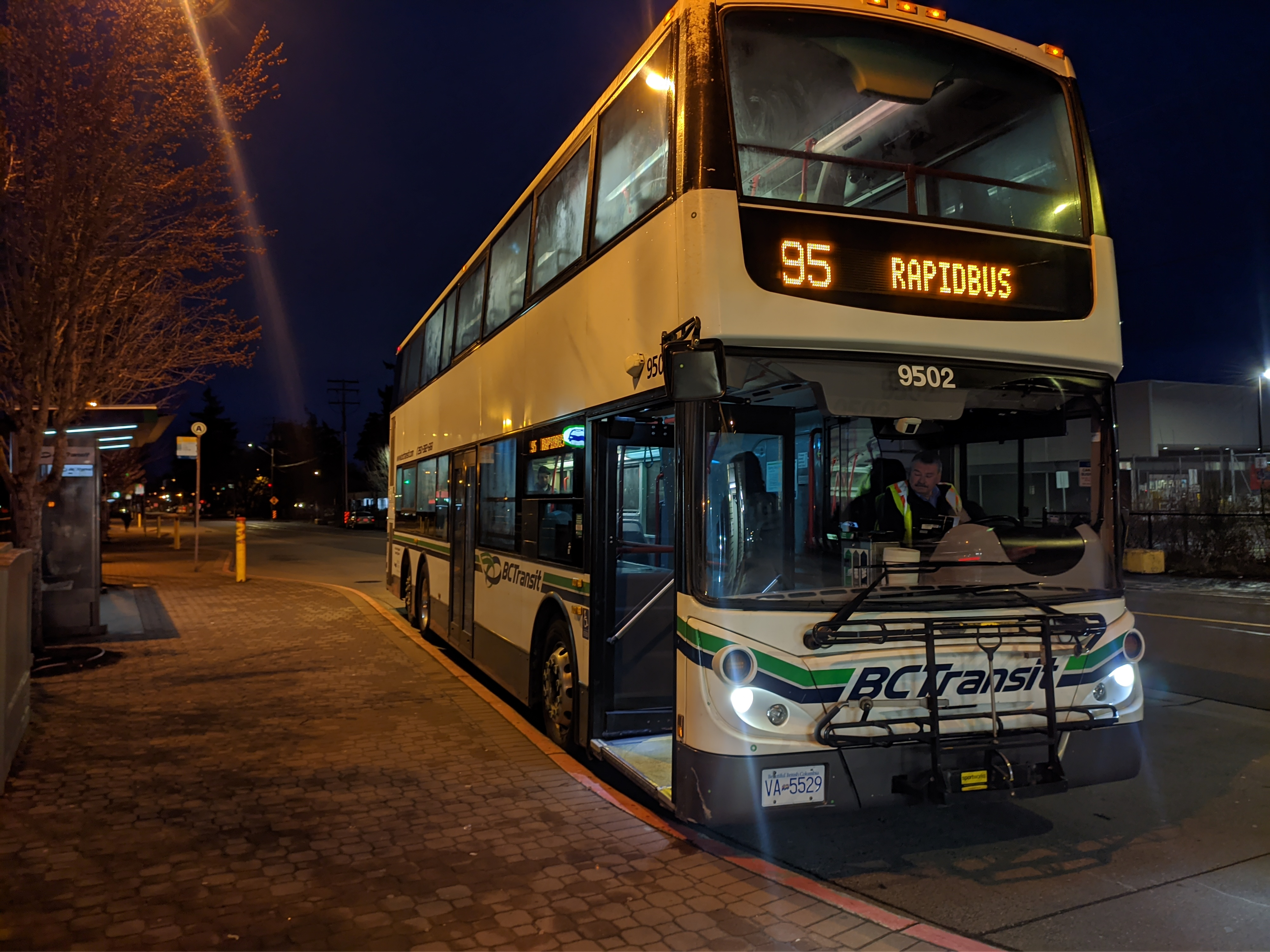

Overview
- System: Victoria Regional Transit System
- Status: Active
- Began service: April 10, 2023
- Predecessors: 50 Langford/50 Downtown
- Night-time: Friday and Saturday

Route
- Locale: Greater Victoria
- Communities served: Victoria, Saanich, View Royal, Colwood, Langford
- Start: Downtown Victoria
- End: Langford

Service
- Level: Daily
- Frequency: Every 7–30 minutes
- Journey time: 35–57 minutes
- Operates: 5:00 a.m. – 1:00 a.m. (3:00 a.m. Fri–Sat)

Blink RapidBus is a bus rapid transit system in Greater Victoria, British Columbia, as part of the Victoria Regional Transit System. Currently, it only consists of one route, line 95, running between Langford and downtown Victoria, connecting Langford, Colwood, View Royal, Saanich, and Victoria.

== History ==
Rapid transit has been proposed in the greater Victoria area since at least 2011, when a light rail line was proposed to link Langford and downtown Victoria. It was expected to cost $1 billion. In 2018, Premier of British Columbia John Horgan said that there wasn't a business case for light rail on the abandoned E&N Railway corridor and that his government would focus on building bus lanes.

There have been transit lanes on portions of Douglas Street, one of the roads line 95 runs on, since 2014, when curb lanes were reserved for transit and bikes during AM and PM peak hours. These lanes have since been expanded to all-day dedicated bus lanes that stretch 4.4 km (2.7 mi) from Fisgard Street to the Trans-Canada Highway (which Douglas Street turns into) at the Burnside Road overpass. The bus lanes are predicted to save bus riders 10 minutes on their journey. Discussions are ongoing with Transport Canada about extending the bus lanes further down the Trans-Canada Highway. There are also plans to add similar lanes to the Island Highway.

In 2021, BC Transit announced plans for a RapidBus system. It was hoped that phase 1 of their plans, a "West Shore Line" between Langford and downtown, would be implemented within 3 years. In phase 2, there are plans for 2 more lines: a "Peninsula Line" and a "UVic Line." The Peninsula line will link downtown Victoria with the Swartz Bay ferry terminal in North Saanich via the Patricia Bay Highway. The UVic line will link the University of Victoria with Uptown via McKenzie Avenue. There would be connections between the 3 RapidBus routes at an Uptown/Saanich Exchange. The project hadn't been costed yet, but transportation minister Rob Fleming noted that there's new funding sources for public transit projects, such as the Canadian federal government announcing a new transit infrastructure fund during the COVID-19 pandemic.

Line 95 commenced service on April 10, 2023. It replaced route 50, following the same routing but with fewer stops. Only one pair of stops were removed, as the other stops continue to be used by other routes. Line 95 is branded orange, as will all future RapidBus routes, with new RapidBus signs and stations being installed. On September 5, 2023, BC Transit extended their late night service on Friday and Saturday nights on multiple routes, including route 95. Buses run until 3:00 a.m. on those nights, although late-night service may not run on holidays.

== Service frequency ==
Line 95 runs every 7–8 minutes during peak hours, at least every 15 minutes from 7:00 a.m. – 10:00 p.m. on weekdays and Saturdays, and from 8:00 a.m. – 10:00 p.m. on Sundays. Service is reduced during early mornings and late nights. Compared to route 50, route 95 has 8% greater service on Saturdays, 12% on weekdays, and 18% on Sundays.
