= Lebahdo =

- Location of Lebahdo in British Columbia
- Coordinates: 49°36′00″N 117°35′00″W
- Country: Canada
- Province: British Columbia
- Area codes: 250, 778

Lebahdo is an unincorporated rural community 3.6 kilometres (2.2 mi) south of Winlaw on the east side of the Slocan River in the West Kootenay region of southern British Columbia.

On the former Slocan branch of the Columbia and Kootenay Railway, the place was previously called Watson Siding. In 1900, Alfred Gillingham Watson obtained a preemption on the west side of the river. The family built a log bridge across the river to their ranch. In 1905, John Bell and A.G. Lambert erected a mill. The next year, the Canadian Pacific Railway opened a flag stop misspelled Lebadho, from "lebahdo”, Chinook Jargon for "shingle", derived from the French "le bardeau".

The mill, which evidently produced shingles, relocated to Taghum after a couple of years. In 1912, Watson sold his ranch to the Doukhobors.

The small community is served by the Pedro Creek Rd stop for West Kootenay Transit System Route 20.

== See also ==
- List of Chinook Jargon placenames
