= Lewis Campbell =

Lewis Campbell may refer to:

- Lew Campbell (c. 1831–1910), Canadian pioneer and rancher
- Lewis Campbell (classicist) (1830–1908), British classical scholar
- Lewis Campbell (footballer) (1864–1938), Scottish footballer
- Lewis B. Campbell, American CEO of Textron
- Lewis D. Campbell (1811–1882), U.S. Representative from Ohio
