= Taghum =

- Location of Taghum in British Columbia
- Coordinates: 49°29′00″N 117°23′00″W
- Country: Canada
- Province: British Columbia
- Region: West Kootenay
- Regional District: Central Kootenay
- Area codes: 250, 778, 236, & 672
- Highways: Highway 6

Taghum is an unincorporated community spanning both shores of the Kootenay River in the West Kootenay region of southeastern British Columbia. The location, on BC Highway 6, is by road about 35 kilometres (22 mi) northeast of Castlegar, and 9 kilometres (6 mi) west of Nelson.

== Name origin ==
In 1901, prospector Mickey Monaghan's 174-acre (0.70 km^{2}) preemption of Lot 2355 (today's north shore Taghum) converted into a Crown grant. The earliest recorded mention of Taghum is 1906. The name from Chinook Jargon means six, which was the mileage distance east to the Nelson wharf, or west to Bonnington Falls.

Around 1907, John Bell and A.G. Lambert moved their sawmill from Lebahdo (also Chinook Jargon) to Sproule Creek (immediately east of the Monaghan property), but no evidence exists that Bell, who later served as Nelson's mayor, conferred the name upon Taghum. The Columbia and Kootenay Railway (C&KR) station was called Taghum at this time.

== Crossings ==
In 1914, the former road bridge linking today's Taghum Hall Rd. (north shore) and Granite Rd. (south shore) opened. In 1931, the steel bridge was raised 2.1 metres (7 ft) to accommodate the reservoir for the Corra Linn Dam.

About 1 kilometre (0.6 mi) upstream, the C&KR Kootenay Crossing was erected in 1891 as four wooden howe truss bridges, but replaced by the present 233-metre (763 ft) steel bridge in 1903. Small falls existed at these narrows prior to the Corra Linn Dam submerging them. In 1979, the parallel pre-stressed concrete highway bridge replaced the downriver road bridge, which was dismantled.

== Adjacent communities ==
On the north shore, immediately west of Taghum was Williams Siding, named after James Nicholas Williams, the inaugural postmaster in the area. A request in 1912 by the residents of both communities to change the post office name to Shrewsbury was unsuccessful, but it changed to Taghum in 1924. Immediately east was Sproule Creek, which emerged as a separate neighbourhood in the 1930s. That location was not named for Robert Sproule, who staked the Bluebell claim, but probably for veteran prospector Charles Clark Sproule.

On the south shore, the area was called Davenport, underpinned by the Granite Poorman mine, which became one of the strongest producers in the district. Abraham Lincoln Davenport, son of John Colver Davenport of Davenport, Washington, managed the sawmill. During the C&KR construction in 1890, Davenport was the headquarters for contractor Hugh F. Keefer, and the railway unloaded supplies at the landing. Within a few years, the name died out. Immediately west of Taghum became Woodsville, with Blewett (formerly Belford) beyond. Immediately east became Granite Siding, also called Granite. The Granite train station was near the south end of the rail bridge.

== Doukhobors ==
In 1911, the Doukhobors purchased a 33-acre farm on the south shore. The acreage, named "Dorogotsennoye" (priceless in Russian), proved challenging to farm, and was submerged in 1931 by the dam.

Freedomites were suspected of being behind the 1947 fire that destroyed Taghum Lumber's modern planing mill. Less than two months later, fire destroyed the nearby school. Unwilling to continue covering the unacceptable risks associated with Freedomite arson, the insurers cancelled fire coverage on all schools in the Nelson District. In 1949, the group blew up railway track east of Taghum. In 1953, sticks of dynamite were found near Taghum at the foot of a power pole and on the train tracks. In 1958, a natural gas pipeline was dynamited near Taghum.

== Accidents & tragedies ==
1920: A father and son drowned when a whirlpool overturned their boat.

1929: One man drowned, and another was seriously injured, when a car plunged from the bridge into the river.

1936: A rancher died when thrown from his wagon by a bolting horse team.

1937: A 10-year-old boy drowned when his bicycle plunged from the bridge into the river.

1938: A car fatally struck a 9-year-old boy near the bridge where his brother died a year earlier. That month, a murder victim was found in a railway cutting.

1939: A Doukhobor man drowned in the river.

1948: An elderly man drowned when he slipped and fell into the river.

1963: A lightning strike electrocuted and killed an elderly woman in her home.

1968: A highways snow plow, which stalled on the railway tracks, was pushed about 23 metres (75 ft) by freight train.

2012: A man who dived into the river drowned.

2015: A person died in a trailer fire.

2016: A dog attack on Taghum Beach inflicted scars on an eight-year-old boy.

== Present community ==
Today, the Taghum community hall and gas station/store are on the north shore, while the public beach is on the south shore at what was Granite Siding.

== See also ==
- List of Chinook Jargon placenames
