= Robert and Henry Pratt =

Robert and Henry Pratt were brothers who were the first settlers in central Barnhartvale, British Columbia, Canada. 'Pratt Road', a main residential access, is named after them.

Robert Pratt (1870–1935) settled in Barnhartvale in 1890; in 1894 his brother (1863–1943) acquired adjoining crown land south of Robert's property.

Robert married Helena Todd, daughter of James Todd.

By the early 1900s Robert Pratt had a highly successful farm with a large apple orchard. Pratt was among the first in the Interior of British Columbia to sell apples commercially, winning a gold medal in 1911 at the International Agricultural Fair in England.
