= Appledale =

Unincorporated community in British Columbia

Coordinates: 49°39′N 117°32′W

Appledale is an unincorporated community spanning both sides of the Slocan River in the West Kootenay region of southern British Columbia. The rural neighbourhood immediately west of Highway 6 is about 4 kilometres (2 mi) north of Winlaw and 16 kilometres (10 mi) south of Slocan.

== Orchards ==
In 1910, a partnership, called the West Kootenay Orchard Association, bought over 3,000 acres of flat land from lumberman John B. Winlaw. Despite claims to the contrary, not unusual for orchard land promotions of the era, no evidence existed that the land was suitable for fruit growing. Although the conditions are not ideal, those landowners who persevered were able to grow apples. Much of the land remains small farming operations.

== East shore ==
The main road and former railway corridor have served this side, which had a flag stop.

== West shore ==
A wooden road bridge existed from the 1920s until its removal in 1984. The crossing helped sell lots across the river at the time. The west shore community is served by the Appledale West Rd stop, on Perrys Back Rd, for West Kootenay Transit System Route 20.
