= James Todd (Canadian settler) =

In 1865, James Todd (1832–1925) and his family established a ranch south-east of Kamloops, British Columbia. He and Lew Campbell could be considered the first settlers of Barnhartvale, British Columbia.

== Starting out in North America ==
James Todd was originally from England. In 1849 he went to California for the gold rush. He does not appear to have struck it rich in California, but he made his living as a packer transporting supplies for the miners. In 1861 Todd began to raise horses and had built up a small herd. His small herd, however, was stolen near Sacramento, California, and he tracked the thieves through Oregon and Washington, and finally got his horses back near Hope, British Columbia. He stayed in British Columbia and worked as a packer on the Brigade Trail for the Hudson's Bay Company. After that, he was quite successful prospecting for gold at Scotch Creek. Todd purchased and very quickly sold again land in Pritchard and on the north side of the South Thompson River (part of the Harper Ranch).

== Acquired land ==
In 1865 Todd acquired 160 acres (0.65 km^{2}) that stretched north and west from the present corner of Todd and Barnhartvale Roads. Todd acquired another 160 acres (0.65 km^{2}) of land extending his property further north to the South Thompson River. In 1870 he purchased land in Barnhartvale along Campbell Creek. James Todd married Maggie Pablos (her father was the Buffalo King of Montana) and had two sons and three daughters.

== Children ==
One of James Todd's sons name was also James. This younger James married Margaret Manson, a daughter of fur trader William Manson who served at the fort in Kamloops in the 1850s and 1860s before settling at Lac la Hache in the Cariboo. James (the third) died in 1943 and Margaret lived until 1964. One of James Todd's and Maggie Pablo's daughters was named Helena. Helena went on to marry Robert Pratt. It is likely that the elder Todd had a house and barn located near where Todd Road and Pratt Road now meet.

== Brother and father ==
In 1874 Joseph Todd (1831–1905), James Todd's brother, also acquired land in Barnhartvale. Joseph Todd got a crown grant on District Lot 470. His property would have included Campbell Creek valley from where Barnhartvale Road intersects with Campbell Creek Road for about one and one-half miles south up the valley.

Joseph and James's father (James Sr., died 1885) also moved out from Ontario and lived with Joseph and his wife. Joseph Todd moved to Quebec in 1904 and died the following year. Joseph Todd's house was situated by Campbell Creek where Barnhartvale Road crosses the creek. Another brother, John, joined James and Joseph. There does not seem to be much of a record of John. It appears that he went on to live in Victoria.

== Sold land ==
By 1874 most of the lower portion of Barnhartvale was owned by the Todds. In the early 1880s the CPR rail line went through the property along the river and James Todd sold the remainder of his southern 160 acres (0.65 km^{2}) to a man named Alfred Morris who established some type of stopping place there.

The Barnhartvale Road as it comes up the hill from Dallas is known as Todd Hill after the Todd family. Of course, Todd Road names the road that runs through the old Todd property and Todd Lake is one of the sources of Campbell Creek.
