= 100 Mile House Regional Transit System =

- Headquarters: 6119 Reita Crescent, 100 Mile House, BC
- Service area: 100 Mile House, 108 Mile Ranch, 103 Mile Lake and Lac la Hache
- Service type: bus service, paratransit
- Alliance: BC Transit
- Routes: 2
- Destinations: 3
- Operator: LDN Transportation
- Website: www.bctransit.com/100-mile-house/

100 Mile House Regional Transit System provides transit services in the Cariboo of British Columbia to 100 Mile House and communities north of 100 Mile House. The system is served by community shuttle-type buses from Monday to Friday.

== Routes ==
=== Scheduled services ===
Route	Route Name	Type	Areas Served	Scheduling	Notes
1	100 Mile House	Local	100 Mile House	Monday-Friday	4 times daily
2	108 Ranch	Regional	103 Mile Lake, 108 Mile Ranch	Monday-Friday	4 times daily

In addition to services provided by the 100 Mile House Regional Transit System, the Ashcroft-Cache Creek-Clinton Transit System provides once-monthly on-request service to 100 Mile House.

=== Paratransit ===
HandyDart service is offered from Monday to Friday during the day. On Thursdays, rural request-based transit services extend to an area including Lac la Hache.

=== BC Transit Health Connections ===
100 Mile House is served by two Health Connections routes, one from 100 Mile House to Williams Lake three times a week, and one in the opposite rotation from Williams Lake to Kamloops on the same days.
