= Peter Barnhart =

- Born: Peter Ashton Barnhart; October 8, 1857; Fredericksburg, Canada West
- Died: February 27, 1941; Kamloops, British Columbia, Canada
- Occupation(s): Railroad conductor, hotel proprietor, rancher
- Known for: Barnhartvale, British Columbia

Peter Ashton Barnhart (October 8, 1857 – February 27, 1941) was the conductor on the first Canadian Pacific Railway (CPR) transcontinental train in 1886. Barnhartvale, British Columbia, Canada is named after him.

== Barnhart Vale Post Office ==
In 1905 Barnhart purchased property in what was then known as Campbell Creek and in 1906 opened a post office there. Initially naming his post office "Campbell Creek (South) Post Office", he changed the name to "Barnhart Vale Post Office" in 1909 because of confusions with "Campbell Creek Post Office" established by Lew Campbell at the Campbell Creek Ranch in 1905.

In 1978, the spelling was officially changed to "Barnhartvale".
