= Victoria Regional Transit System =

Transit system of Greater Victoria, British Columbia, Canada

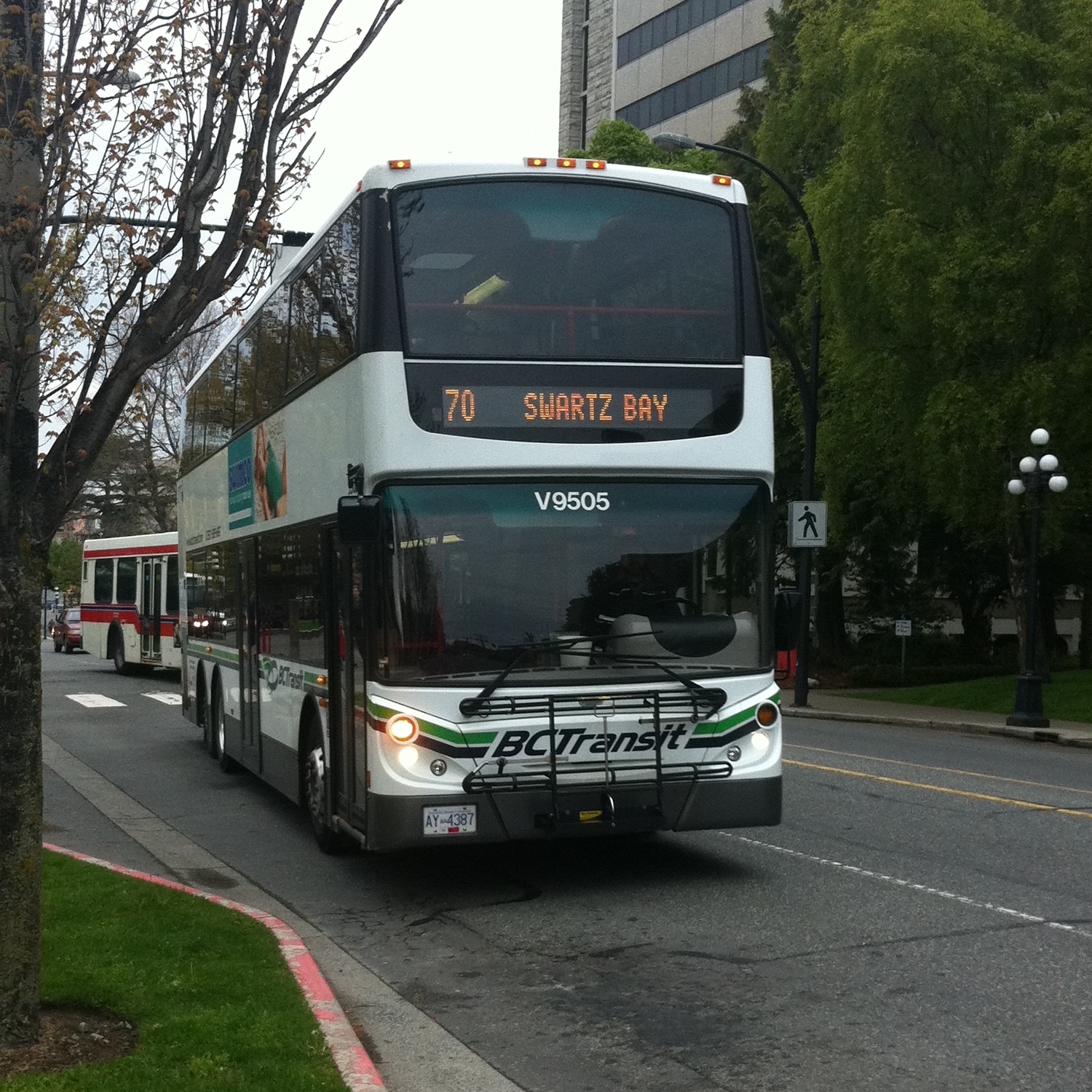
- Founded: 1890
- Headquarters: 520 Gorge Road East; Victoria, British Columbia
- Service type: Bus service, paratransit
- Alliance: BC Transit
- Routes: 58
- Hubs: 8
- Fleet: 356
- Daily ridership: 132,600 (weekdays, Q2 2026)
- Annual ridership: 26,557,500 (2025)
- Operator: Bus service: BC Transit; HandyDART: Transdev
- Website: www.bctransit.com/victoria/

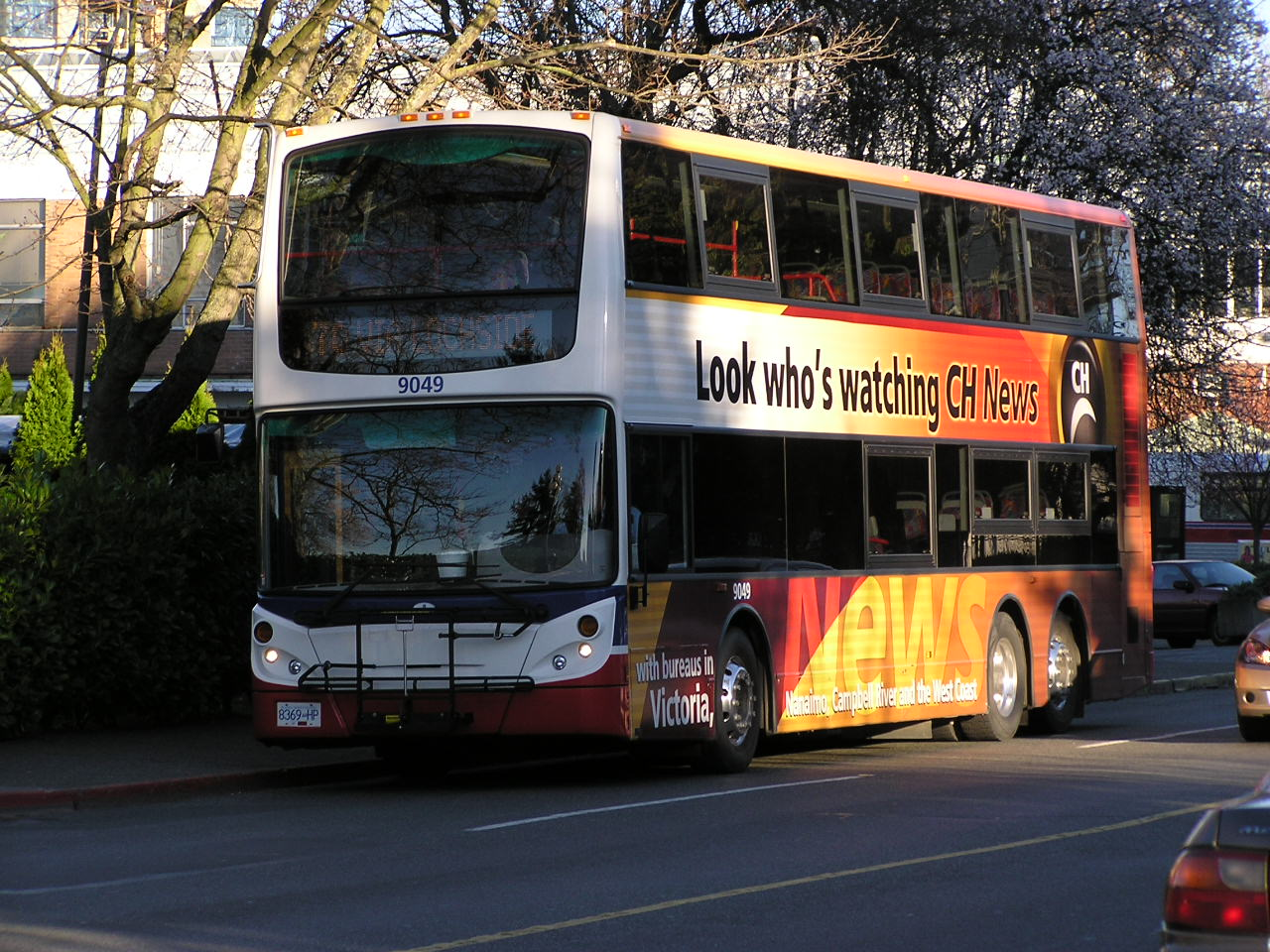
An Alexander Dennis Enviro500 equipped with bike rack, one of the double deckers servicing Victoria.

The Victoria Regional Transit System provides public transportation in the Greater Victoria region of British Columbia, Canada. Its operations are governed by the Victoria Regional Transit Commission in association with BC Transit. There were 25 million trips in 2023–2024.

== History ==
Transit service began on February 22, 1890 by the National Electric Tramway and Light Company with four street cars on two routes. On May 26, 1896 a packed streetcar crashed through the Point Ellice Bridge and 55 people were killed. The Consolidated Electric Railway Company was forced into receivership by the disaster and emerged reorganized as the British Columbia Electric Railway on April 15, 1897.

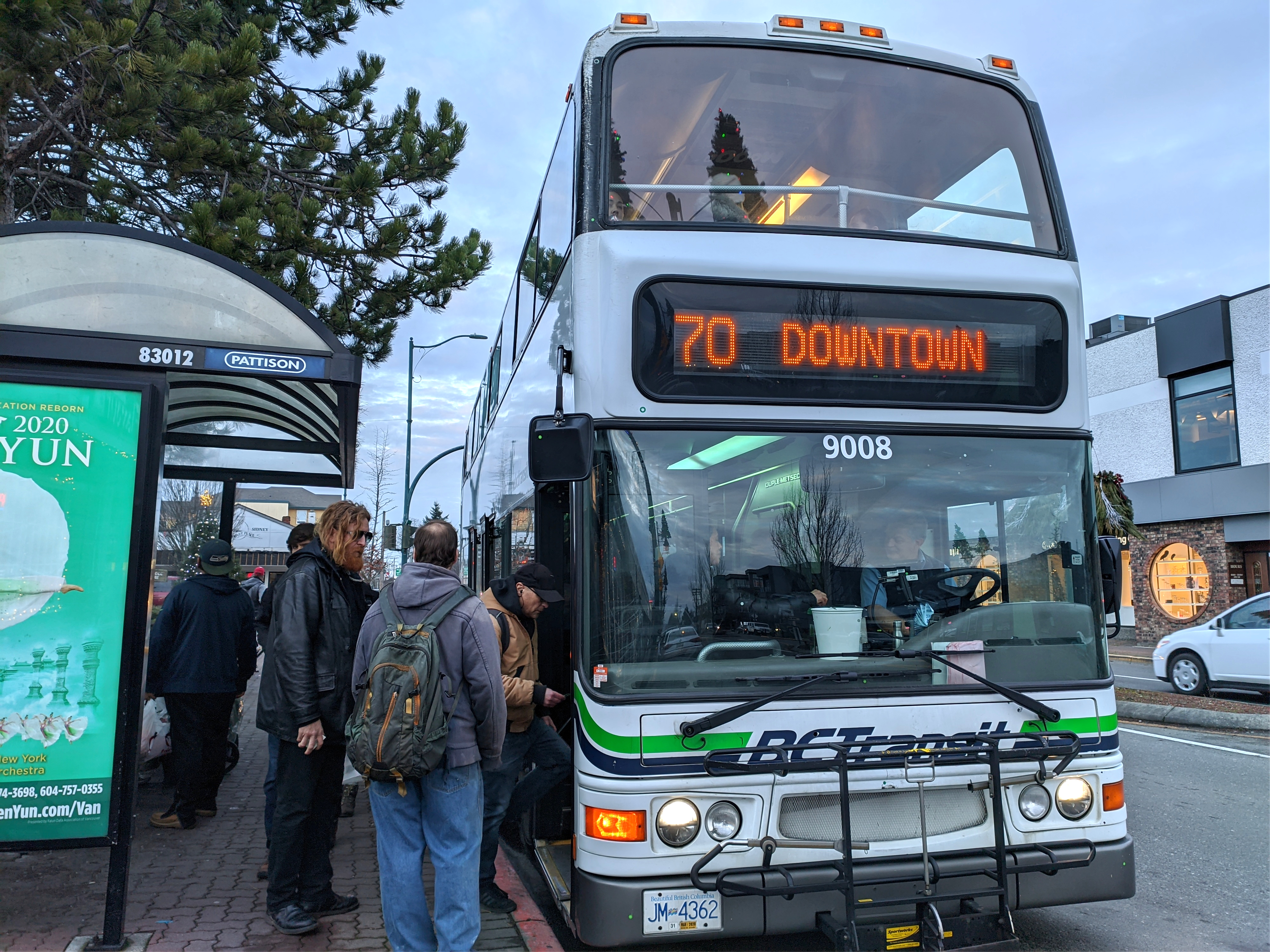
A Dennis Trident at Fifth at Beacon stop in downtown Sidney. This bus is part of the first order of low-floor double-decker buses for public transit in Canada.

The use of buses started in 1923 for outlying routes. Although trolley buses were tried in 1945, the transit system was completely converted to motor buses in 1948. In 1961 BC Electric became part of BC Hydro, a Crown corporation, before the transit system was moved to the crown agency that would become BC Transit. In 2000, Victoria became the first city in North America to use low-floor buses and double decker buses in regular public transit service, as well as the first city to use hybrid double-decker buses in 2009. Victoria followed other BC Transit networks in late February 2020 with the introduction of compressed natural gas vehicles to their fleet.

Until 2019, all BC Transit vehicles in Victoria were equipped with Trekker Breeze+ annunciators to call out streets for the blind. BC Transit's NextRide automated stop and route announcements took the place of the street announcements, along with electronic screens on all buses showing the next stop.

In April 2023, BC Transit launched the first bus rapid transit line in the Victoria region. The new line is branded as Blink RapidBus (also operating as Line 95) and makes fewer stops with faster and more frequent service compared to typical bus lines.

== Operations ==
The transit system has a total fleet of 356 buses on 37 conventional routes and 18 community bus routes covering Greater Victoria including: Victoria, Saanich, Oak Bay, Langford, Esquimalt, View Royal, Colwood, Central Saanich, North Saanich, Sidney, Metchosin, Highlands and Sooke.

Primary bus route destinations are: Downtown Victoria, the University of Victoria, the Royal Oak Exchange in Saanich, the CFB Dockyard in Esquimalt, Langford Exchange in Langford, the Colwood Exchange in Colwood and the B.C. Ferries terminal at Swartz Bay in North Saanich.

=== Routes ===
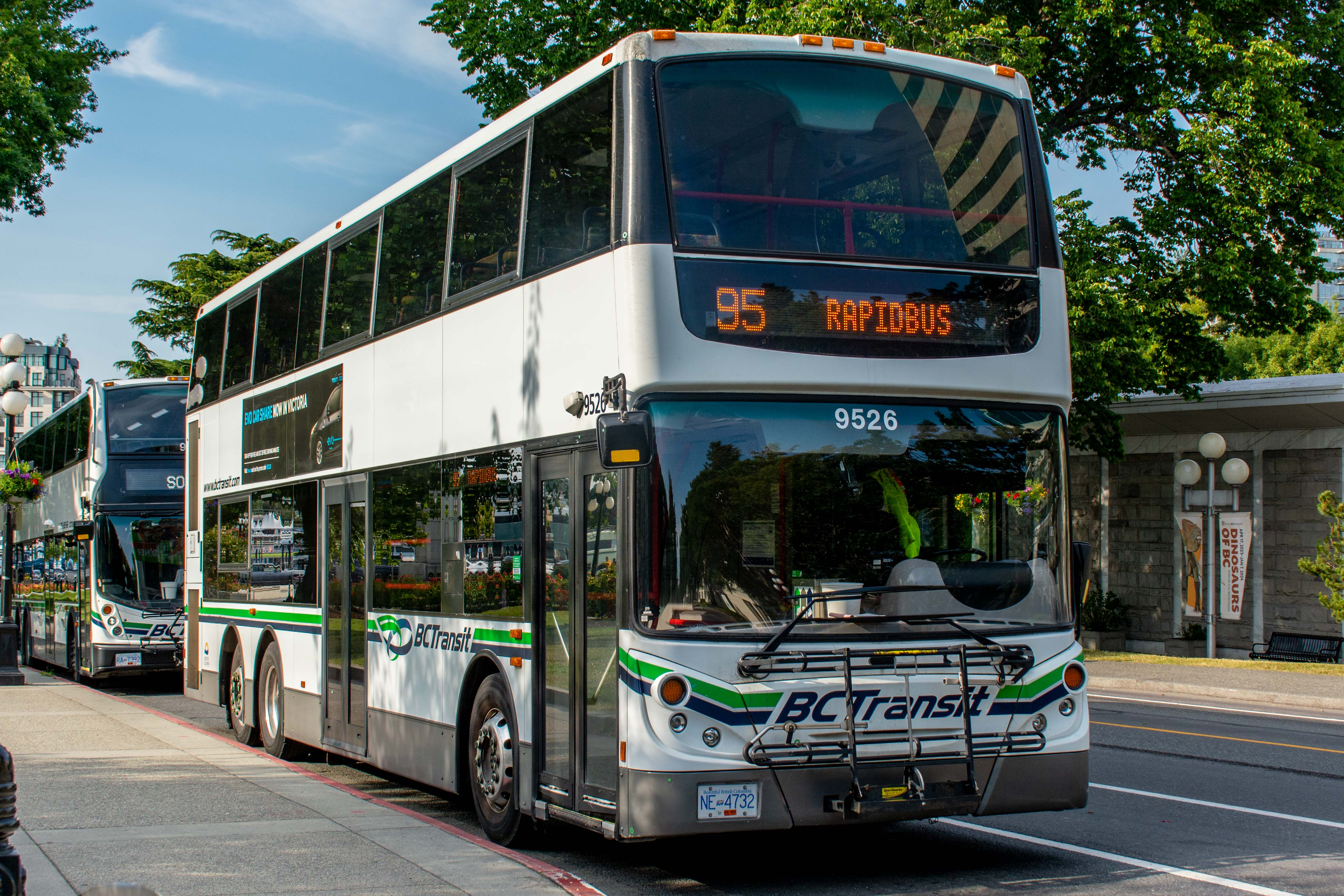
The 95 Langford / Downtown Blink RapidBus is the only RapidBus route in the Victoria Regional Transit System

Routes are named for the direction of travel, thus each route has two (or more, if the route utilizes branches or short turns) names, indicating direction. Some routes also change in the evening or on weekends, which changes the route name again.

Routes are divided into four levels:

- Local routes, which are shown in grey and encompass the majority of routes
- Frequent routes, which are shown in light blue and have headways of 15 minutes or better, 7 am to 7 pm, Monday to Friday
- Regional routes, which are shown in light orange and provide limited-stop service
- RapidBus routes, which are shown in dark orange and provide limited-stop service with headways of 15 minutes or better, 7 am to 10 pm, every day

Some routes, such as 15 Esquimalt / UVic meet the requirements of both the Frequent level and the Regional level, but are listed as Regional routes.

Route frequency in the Victoria Regional Transit System varies greatly, some routes operate on a commuter-focused schedule, such as the 51 UVic / Langford and the 65 Sooke / Downtown via Westhills, with directional departures limited to morning or afternoon times. Other local routes, such as the 43 Royal Roads via Belmont Park, operate infrequently due to low demand. Only one school special operates in the Victoria Regional Transit System, the 17 Cedar Hill, which operates once per direction per weekday. Other buses operate variants of their standard routes around the bell schedule of local schools.

Victoria Regional Transit System Route List
Route	Route Name	Notes
1	South Oak Bay / Downtown	
2	James Bay / South Oak Bay	
3	James Bay / Royal Jubilee	
4	UVic / Downtown via Hillside	
5	James Bay / Willows	Was a branch of route 2 before 3 January 2022.
6	Royal Oak Exchange / Downtown via Royal Oak Centre	
6A	Royal Oak Exchange / Downtown via Emily Carr	
6B	Royal Oak Exchange / Downtown via Chatterton	
7	UVic / Downtown via Fairfield	
7N	UVic / Downtown via Cook Street Vlg Night Route	
8	Interurban / Tillicum Centre / Oak Bay	
9	Royal Oak / UVic	
10	James Bay / Royal Jubilee	
11	Tillicum Centre / UVic	
12	University Heights / UVic	
14	Vic General / UVic	
15	Esquimalt / UVic	
17	Cedar Hill	
21	Interurban / Downtown	
21N	Interurban Night Route	
22	Vic General / Hillside Centre	
22A	Vic General / Hillside Centre via Strawberry Vale	
24	Cedar Hill / Tillicum Centre	
25	Maplewood / Tillicum Centre	
26	UVic / Dockyard via McKenzie-Tillicum	
26A	UVic / Dockyard via Saanich Rd	Short turn service introduced on 3 September 2024.
26B	UVic / Dockyard via Carey Rd	Short turn service introduced on 3 September 2024.
27	Gordon Head / Downtown	
27x	Downtown Express	
28	Majestic / Downtown	
28x	Majestic Express	
30	Royal Oak Exchange / Downtown	
31	Royal Oak Exchange / Downtown	
32	Cordova Bay / Royal Oak Exchange	
35	Ridge	
38	Royal Oak Exchange / Westhills Exchange	
39	Interurban / Royal Oak / UVic	
40	UVic / Dockyard via McKenzie-Admirals	
43	Royal Roads via Belmont Park	
46	Dockyard / Westhills	
47	Goldstream Meadows / Downtown	
48	Happy Valley / Downtown	
49	Skirt Mountain / Langford Exch	
51x	Westhills Exch / UVic Express	
52	Colwood Exch / Bear Mountain	
53	Vic General / Langford Exchange	
54	Metchosin / Langford Exchange	
55	Happy Valley / Langford Exchange	
57	Thetis Heights / Langford Exchange	
58	Goldstream Meadows / Langford Exchange	
59	Triangle Mountain / Langford Exchange	
60	Wishart / Langford Exchange	
61	Sooke / Langford / Downtown	
63	Otter Point	
64	Langford Exch / Sooke via E Sooke and Beecher Bay	
65	Sooke / Downtown via Westhills	
70	Swartz Bay / Downtown	
70x	Swartz Bay / Downtown Express	
71	Swartz Bay / Downtown	
72	Swartz Bay / Downtown	
72A	Swartz Bay / Downtown via Airport	
75	Saanichton / Royal Oak / Downtown	
76	Swartz Bay / UVic	
81	Brentwood / Saanichton / Sidney / Swartz Bay	
83	Sidney / Brentwood / Royal Oak	
85	North Saanich	
87	Tsawout / Sidney via Airport and Dean Park	
88	Airport / Sidney via Sidney Industrial	
88A	Airport / Sidney bypass Sidney Industrial	
95	Langford / Downtown RapidBus	

==== Cowichan Valley Regional Transit System ====
Victoria is also served by two routes in the Cowichan Valley Regional Transit System. While these routes are primarily aimed at commuters, one weekday midday round trip and three Saturday round trips are provided on the 66 CVX.

Cowichan Valley Regional Transit System routes serving Victoria
Route	Route Name	Notes
44	Victoria / Duncan	Service rebranded as 66 CVX on 3 September 2023
66	CVX (Cowichan - Victoria Express)	
99	SVX (Shawnigan Lake - Victoria Express)	

==== Late Night Service ====
On Friday and Saturday evenings, BC Transit extends service on routes 4, 6, 14, 15, 26, 27/28, 61, and 95 until approximately 2:30 or 3 am. Late Night Service operates with headways of 30 minutes (except routes 26 and 61, which have late night headways of 60 minutes).

=== Fares ===
Current fares are listed in the table below:

	Children (12 and under)	Youth (13-18) and Senior (65+)	Adult (19+)
Cash Fare	Free	$3.00	
DayPASS	Free	$6.00 (or two tickets)	
10 Ticket Pack	Free	$22.50	
Monthly Pass	Free	$45	$85

Children under age five are required to be accompanied by someone age twelve or older. Until 1 September 2021, children aged five to twelve were required to pay the youth fare.

Daypasses (stylized as DayPASS) are only sold on board the bus. Since Daypasses can be bought using two tickets, they can effectively be purchased for $4.50 by purchasing a pack of ten tickets, which have a price of $2.25 per ticket.

Students at the University of Victoria, Royal Roads University, and Camosun College are part of the U-PASS program. All students pay for subsidized bus passes as part of their fees ($81.00 for four months).

Only one fare zone exists for the Victoria network, as in April 2008 the system eliminated the then $3 two-zone fare.

=== Accessibility ===
Victoria's transit fleet is fully accessible, with either ramps or lifts providing access. Some bus stops are considered inaccessible due to their design, with inadequate space to accommodate wheelchairs or operation of vehicle ramps/lifts.

Paratransit services, called HandyDART, are also available. Unlike the regular bus system, HandyDART is contracted out. The system currently has 48 vans with door-to-door service for people who cannot ride the conventional buses. Booking is required and restrictions on who can use the system apply.

=== Fleet ===
- New Flyer Industries Xcelsior (XN40)
- New Flyer Industries Xcelsior (XE40)
- New Flyer Industries D40LF (Retired)
- New Flyer Industries DE40LF (Diesel-Electric Hybrid) (Retired)
- Grande West Vicinity CNG
- Dennis Trident (Retired)
- Alexander Dennis Enviro500
- Nova Bus LFS

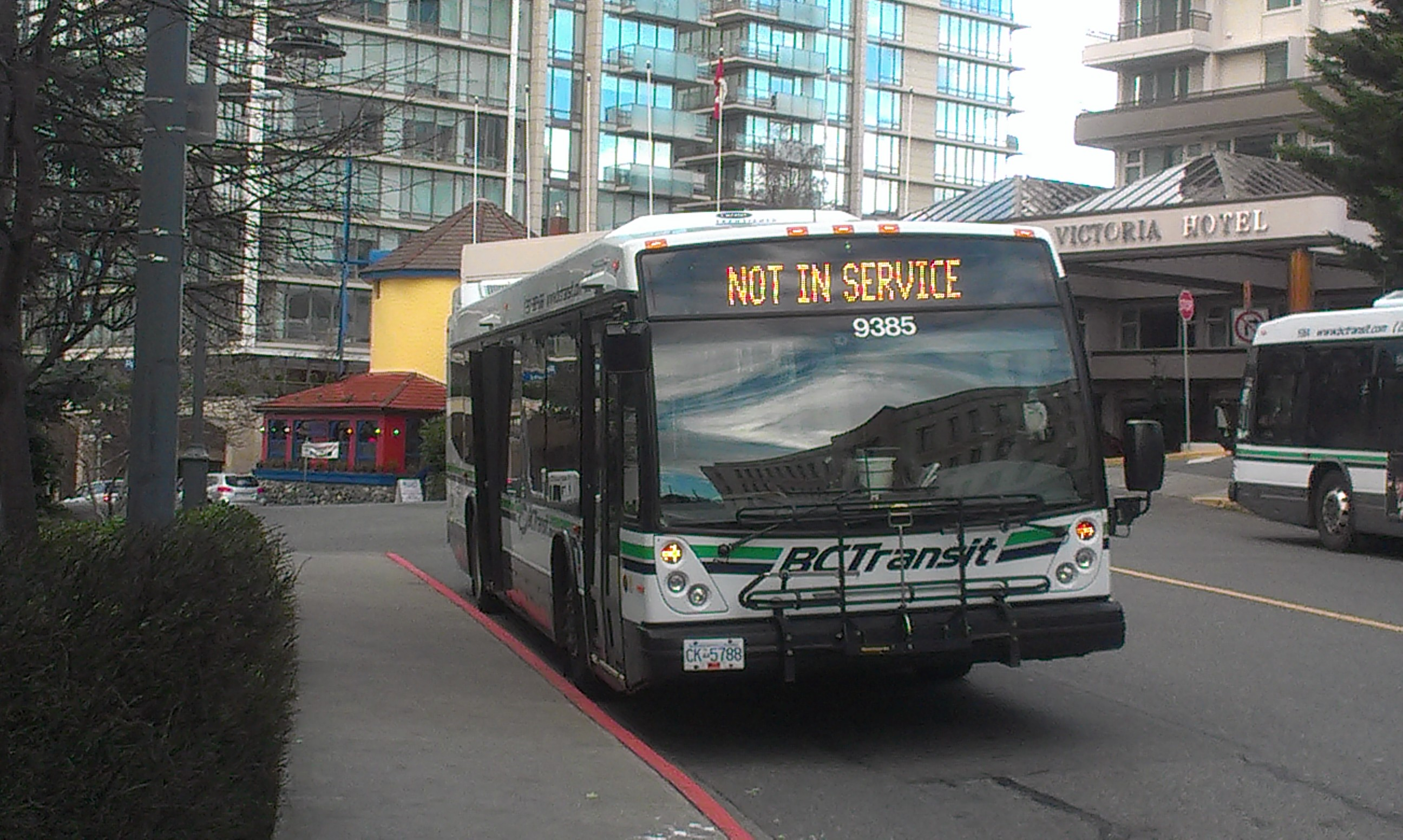
A Nova Bus LFS stopped on the side of the road in Downtown Victoria.

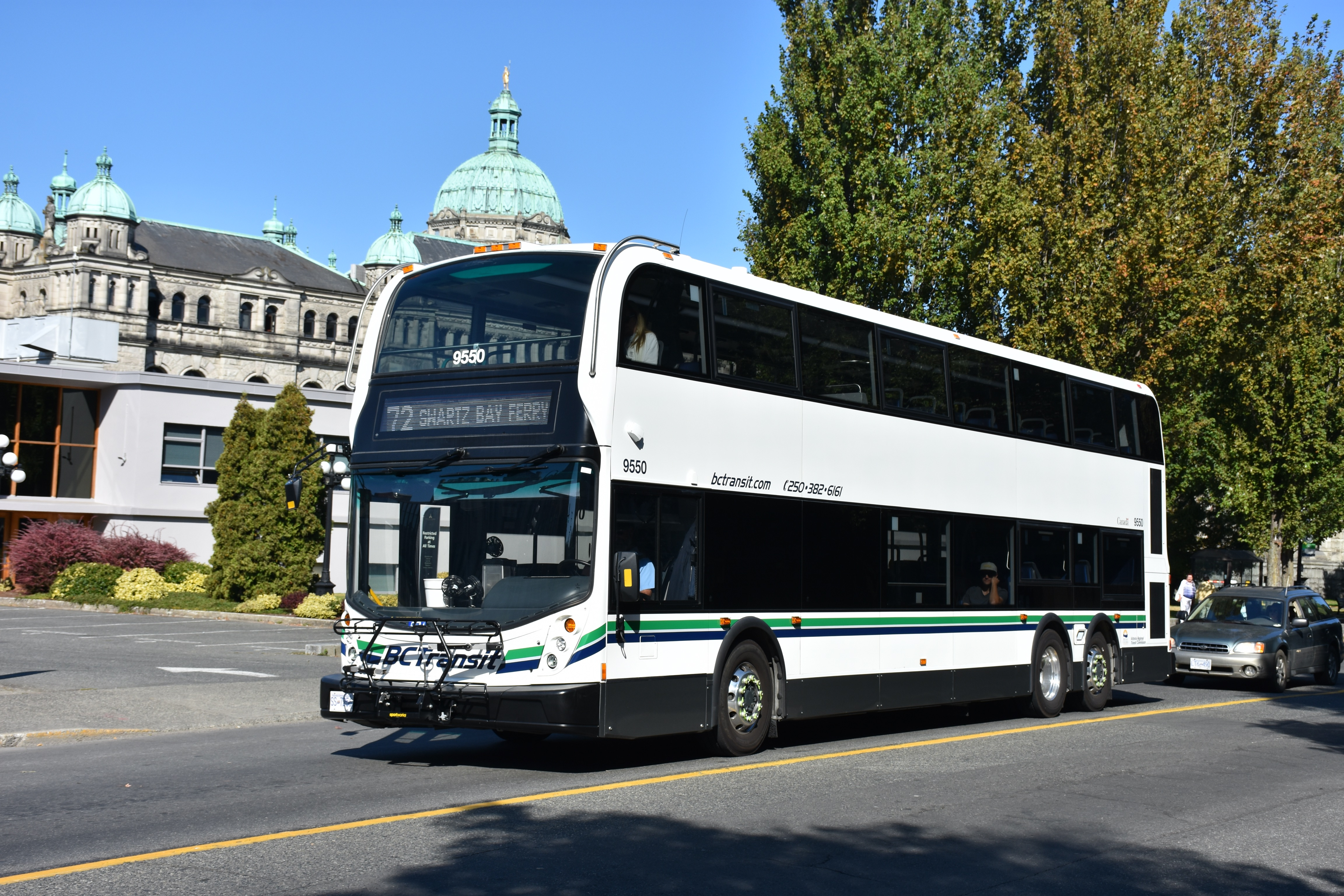
A 2021 Alexander Dennis Enviro500 leaving Legislature Exchange for Swartz Bay Ferry Terminal.

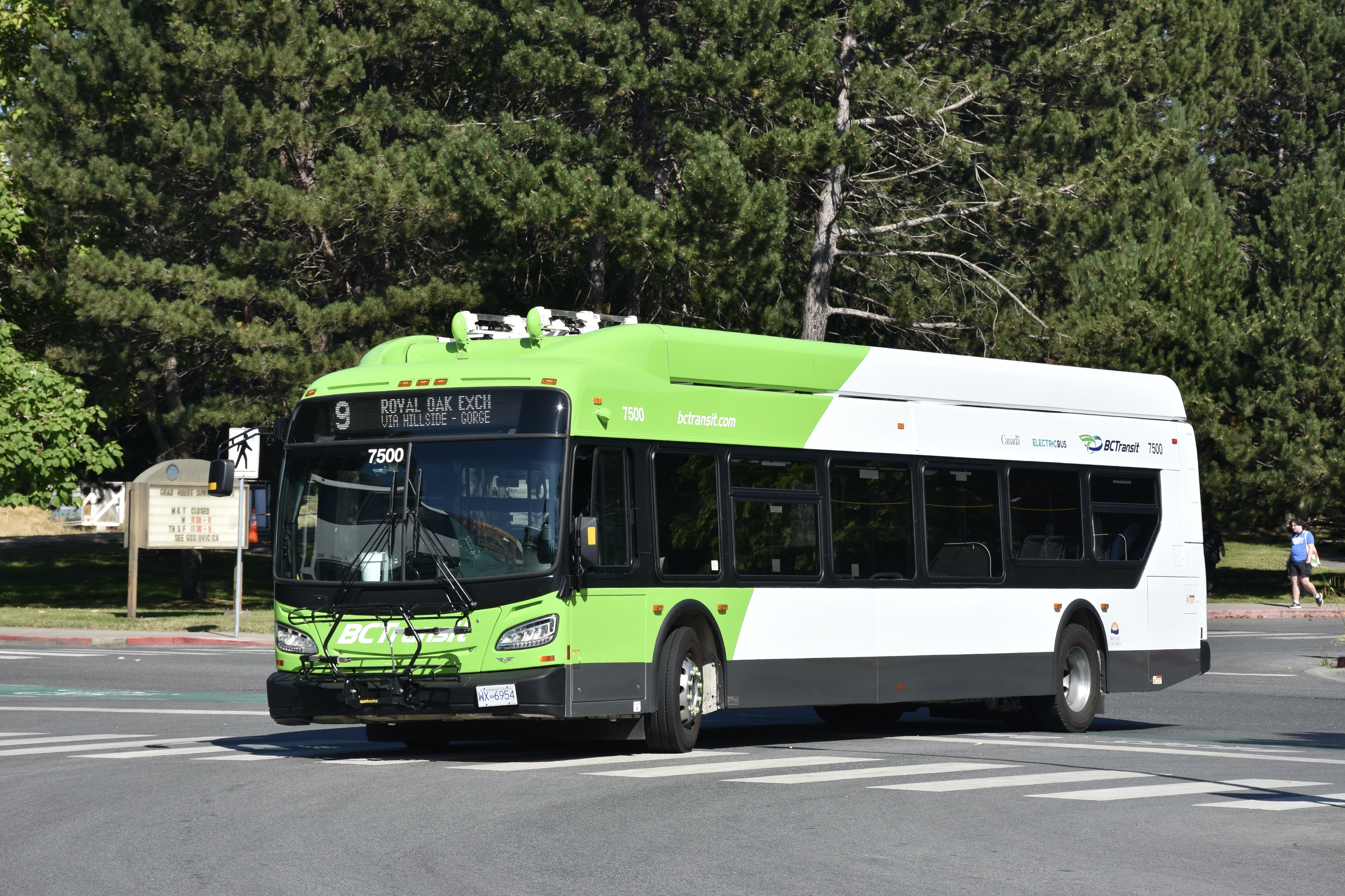
A 2025 New Flyer Industries XE40 on route 9 'Royal Oak Exchange via Hillside and Gorge' at UVIC starting a trip.

== Expansion possibilities ==
A proposal was made in 2011 to build a light rail line from downtown Victoria, routing along Douglas Street to Uptown, beside the Trans Canada Highway and the Galloping Goose bike path to Six Mile, then along the Old Island Highway through Colwood to Langford. Several options had been offered for LRT phased implementation, with all variations starting in downtown Victoria, and initially providing service to either Six Mile, Colwood Exchange or all the way to Langford Exchange. While the E&N rail corridor was considered as a potential route under this proposal, it wasn't selected as the ideal candidate. Full implementation of the line between downtown and Langford for initial opening was projected to cost $950 million. Long term transit network plans outlined potential rapid transit corridors for the future, including two that spanned from Uptown, with a corridor north to the Saanich Peninsula and Sidney, and a corridor east following McKenzie to UVic.

In 2018, British Columbia's Premier John Horgan rejected the idea of light rail service in the Victoria area because the area's low population would not justify light rail.

=== E&N rail corridor ===
The E&N rail tracks from up island provide access into Vic West, across the inlet from downtown Victoria. The E&N tracks used to run into downtown via the Johnson Street bridge, but as the bridge has been replaced due to deterioration, the railway component of the bridge has been permanently closed since in 2011. There is no longer rail on the Downtown side of the Johnson Street Bridge. Rail has not been installed on the new bridge, but may be installed in the future.

BC Transit has studied the E&N rail corridor as a commuter rail link from West Shore to Victoria. A bike path is being built beside the E&N tracks, while allowing rail service to continue. No formal plans have been announced for commuter rail on this corridor.

== Board of directors ==
The Victoria Regional Transit System is overseen by an 8-member transit commission. As of June 2025, the board members are:

- Mayor Ryan Windsor - Chair District of Central Saanich
- Mayor Dean Murdock, District of Saanich
- Councillor Colin Plant, District of Saanich
- Mayor Kevin Murdoch, District of Oak Bay
- Mayor Marie-Therese Little, District of Metchosin
- Mayor Maja Tait, District of Sooke
- Mayor Maryanne Alto, City of Victoria
- Councillor Jeremy Caradonna, City of Victoria
