= South Slocan =

Coordinates: 49.458°N 117.524°W

South Slocan is an unincorporated community in rural British Columbia with a population of approximately 100 people, many of whom are followers of the Doukhobors religion. It is located on the northwest shore of the Kootenay River in the West Kootenay region of southeastern British Columbia. The village comprises 51 households. A former railway junction on BC Highway 6, it is approximately 24 kilometres (15 mi) northeast of Castlegar, and 20 kilometres (12 mi) southwest of Nelson. Its postal category is Rural Route One.

== Early settlement ==
South Slocan was originally called Ward's Ferry, Ward's Crossing, and Ward's Bay. In 1888, Thomas Martindale Ward received the government ferry contract across the Kootenay River at Slocan Pool, about 750 metres (820 yd) south. This crossing was a critical link on the trail between Nelson and Sproat's Landing. The rough hotel he erected was called the Rustle House, because the provisions were so meagre that guests needed to rustle the deficiency for sustenance. The earliest reference to Ward's Ferry was 1890, and Ward's Bay was 1891. Canadian Pacific Railway (CP) renamed the place as Slocan Junction in 1897, and South Slocan in 1912. Slocan Junction remained in popular use into the 1920s, and the school name did not change until 1931.

== Railway ==
In 1897, CP opened the Columbia and Kootenay Railway (C&KR) 50.4-kilometre (31.3 mi) branch line from South Slocan up to Slocan City. The station was 4.2 kilometres (2.6 mi) northeast of Crescent Valley on the branch line, and 0.5 kilometres (0.3 mi) northeast of Fraine, and 2.4 kilometres (1.5 mi) southwest of Bonnington Falls, on the southern main line.

On the C&KR branch, passenger service ended around 1957 and the final freight run was in 1993, the rail bed since becoming the Slocan Valley Rail Trail. On the southern main line, passenger service ended around 1964.

Train Timetables (Regular stop or Flag stop)
Year	1898	1907	1918	1929	1932	1935	1939	1943	1948	1953	1954	1961
Ref.												
Sthn. Main	Regular	Regular	Regular	Regular	Regular	Regular	Regular	Regular	Regular	Regular	Regular	Flag
Branch	Regular	Regular	Regular	Regular	Regular	Regular	Regular	Regular	Regular	Regular	Regular	Nil

== Industry and later community ==
The 1928 opening of the South Slocan dam grew the settlement that became known as South Slocan Village. Although never incorporated, its commission of management functions like a council. The blurred boundaries now include parts of what might formerly have been considered Crescent Valley or Shoreacres. South Slocan is on the Kootenay, and not the Slocan, so is not generally regarded as being in the Slocan Valley. The Highway 3A/6 intersection is called Playmor Junction, but is virtually synonymous with South Slocan.

In 1976, the Kootenay Canal hydroelectric power station opened.

In 2019, Kalesnikoff Lumber erected a 10,000-square-metre (110,000 sq ft) multi species mass timber manufacturing facility. Reaching full production the next year, the state-of-the-art processing plant created around 50 new technology-centered jobs.

When the former school building (1929), which has been used for various community activities, came to the end of its useful life, demolition in 2021 was unavoidable. Although the stores and hotels are long gone, St. Mathew's Anglican Church (1914), with its pseudo Gothic windows, alcove entrance and small bell tower atop the steeply pitched roof, still clings to the hillside along Slocan Village Road at the eastern edge.

== Notable people ==
- Kliph Nesteroff, best-selling author and television personality.
- Shawn Hook, musician.

== See also ==
- "1899 Kootenay map". www.library.ubc.ca. p. 1.
