= HandyDART =

Canadian accessible transit service

One of TransLink's electric HandyDart pilot vehicles is parked and charging at TransDev's yard in Richmond.

HandyDART is an accessible transit service in British Columbia that uses vans or small buses to transport disabled or elderly passengers who cannot use the normal transit system. This service provides door-to-door service and is available in all of the province's larger centres, as well as in many smaller communities.

== BC Transit ==
BC Transit operates 16 custom transit (HandyDART) systems:

- Alberni-Clayoquot
- Campbell River
- Central Fraser Valley
- Chilliwack
- Cranbrook
- Kamloops
- Kelowna Regional
- Kitimat
- Kootenay Boundary
- Nanaimo Regional
- Penticton
- Prince George
- Prince Rupert
- Vernon Regional
- Victoria Regional
- West Kootenay

== Metro Vancouver ==
As of 2025, in Metro Vancouver, the HandyDART service contractor is Transdev. Transdev acquired the previous operator, First Transit, in 2023.

=== Roster ===
- Ford cut-away vans – modified mini buses (Ford Transit chassis)
- Chevrolet and GMC cut-away vans – modified mini buses (Chevrolet Express/GMC Savana chassis)

Other modes of transit delivered by TransLink, the Metro Vancouver transportation authority, are also accessible:

- All buses and community shuttles
- SkyTrain
- West Coast Express
- SeaBus

== See also ==
- Coast Mountain Bus Company
- Cutaway bus
