= Barnhartvale =

- Community
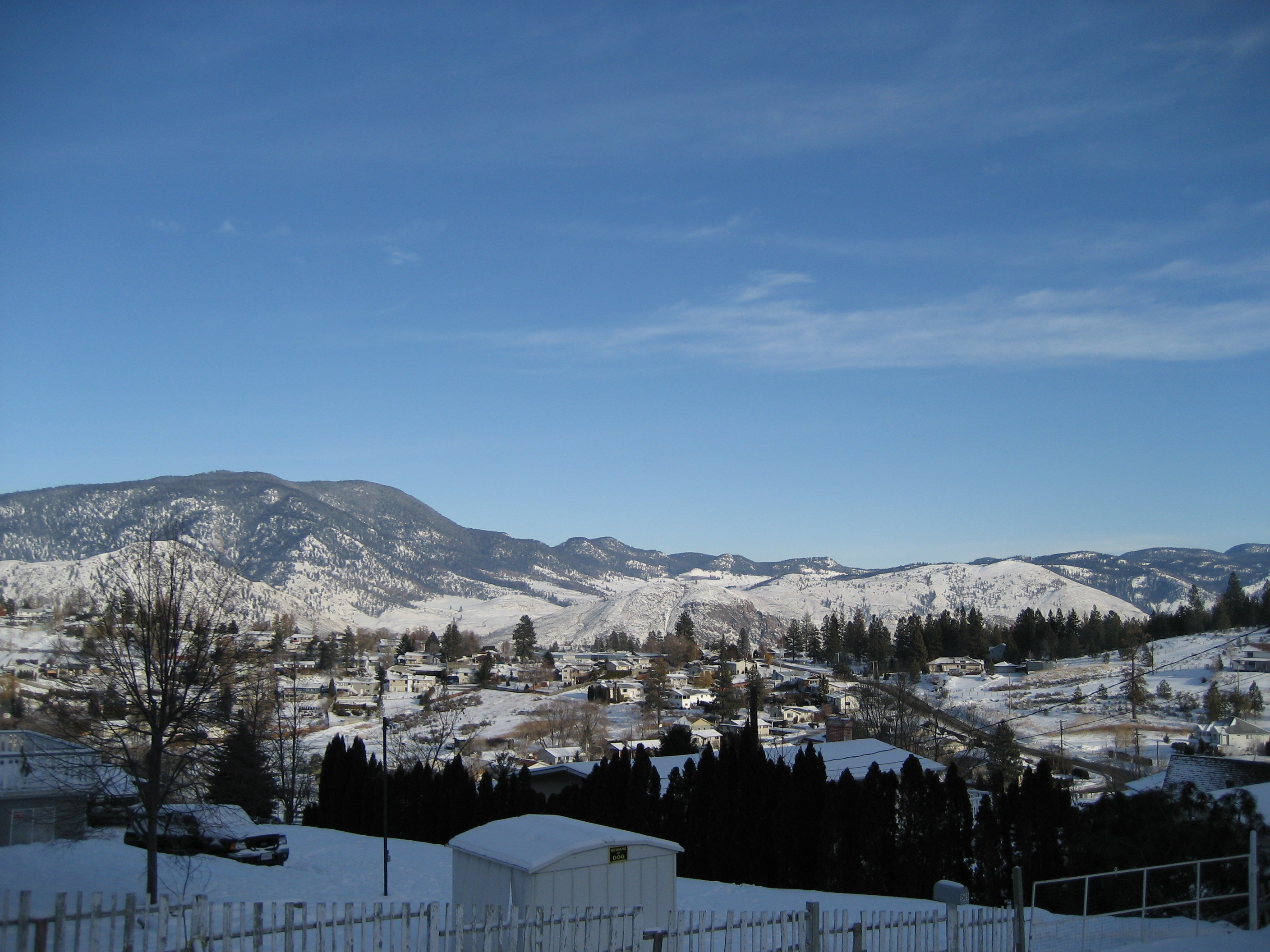
- View of Barnhartvale from South end facing North

- Location within British Columbia Location within Canada Location within North America
- Coordinates: 50°38′02″N 120°07′34″W
- Country: Canada
- Province: British Columbia
- City: Kamloops
- Time zone: UTC-8 (Pacific Time)
  - Summer (DST): UTC-7 (Pacific Daylight Time)

Barnhartvale, originally Barnhart Vale, is located at the southeast end of Kamloops, south of Dallas in British Columbia, Canada. The area includes riding stables, farms, and ranches. There is a local Esso gas station, and a local elementary school, Robert L. Clemitson. The main road which runs through Barnhartvale is Barnhartvale Road. Todd Road and Pratt Road are the main accesses through the subdivided western portion of Barnhartvale.

== History ==
Barnhartvale was originally referred to as Campbell Creek or Campbell's Creek until 1909. It is now named after Peter Barnhart, who was the conductor on the first CPR train through Kamloops. He moved to Campbell Creek and opened a post office and in 1909 the name was changed to Barnhart Vale Post to the annoyance of locals. In 1978 the spelling was formally changed to one word, Barnhartvale.

1865 marks the beginning of the written history of the area later named Barnhartvale. That was the year that James Todd and Lew Campbell, the first two pioneers, arrived. The next settlers in the region were John and William McLeod in 1879. A major road in the area is named after the Robert and Henry Pratt families who occupied the bulk of the valley after 1890. In 1973, Barnhartvale and other outlying communities were amalgamated with the City of Kamloops.
