= Bella Coola Transit =

- Service area: Bella Coola; Bella Coola Valley; Hagensborg
- Service type: bus service, paratransit
- Alliance: BC Transit
- Routes: 1
- Website: www.bctransit.com/bella-coola-valley/home

Bella Coola Transit System provides transit services in the Bella Coola Valley of British Columbia. The system is served by community shuttle-type buses from Monday to Saturday.

== Routes ==
=== Scheduled services ===
On-request service and flag-service at non-designated stops is provided.

Route	Route Name	Type	Areas Served	Scheduling	Notes
	Bella Coola	Regional	Bella Coola; Four Mile; Hagensborg; Jourdenais; Glacierview; Firvale	Monday-Saturday	Five times daily. Firvale on request only.
