= Slocan Valley Rail Trail =

Rail trail in British Columbia, Canada

Coordinates: 49.76100°N 117.47328°W

The Slocan Valley Rail Trail is a multi-use recreational rail trail in the West Kootenay region of southeastern British Columbia.

== Overview ==
The trail uses the former Columbia and Kootenay Railway rail corridor along the section of the Slocan Valley between South Slocan and Slocan that the Canadian Pacific Railway (CP) abandoned in 1994. Subsequently, CP removed the rails and ties, and dismantled the bridges.

The 52-kilometre (32 mi) trail is owned by the government of BC and managed by the Slocan Valley Heritage Trail Society (SVHTS).

== Timeline ==
1993: CP ran last freight train on September 14.
1994: The SVHTS was formed. CP applied to abandon line.
1999: CP gifted the right-of-way to the Trans Canada Trail (TCT).
2000: TCT gave the property to the BC government.
2002: SVHTS signed a 10-year agreement to manage rail trail.
2003: SICEA grant received.
2005 Construction of three new bridges, complete grading and brushing, extensive resurfacing and construction of trailheads.
2007: Trail opened.
2012: Became official TCT spur.
2017: South Slocan–Crescent Valley becomes paved greenway.

== Sections ==
Sections.
From	To	Distance	Features
South Slocan	Crescent Valley	5.0 km (3.1 mi)	Popular beach, pub, steeper grade, culvert tunnel
Crescent Valley	Passmore	16.5 km (10.3 mi)	Beaches, swift water, narrow winding valley, farms, commercial/residential, rocky shoreline
Passmore	Winlaw	10.1 km (6.3 mi)	Winding, forested, close river access, Little Slocan River mouth, marshland and wildlife habitat
Winlaw	Lemon Creek	12.0 km (7.5 mi)	Multiple cafés, shopping, farms, private small beaches, historic markers
Lemon Creek	Slocan	8.1 km (5.0 mi)	Wildlife sanctuary, First Nations habitat site, close river access, Slocan Beach

== South Slocan box culvert ==
In 1962, southwest of South Slocan, a 90-metre (300 ft) long two-lane highway bridge, connecting embankment approaches, replaced a railway crossing. Five decades later, that bridge over the rail trail needed costly structural rehabilitation. In 2017, an embankment fill, with a 50-metre (160 ft) long concrete box culvert under the highway for cyclists and pedestrians, replaced the bridge. Local artist Peter Vogelaar and volunteers painted a mural along the length of the tunnel detailing the valley history.
