= Pritchard, British Columbia =

Pritchard
- Community
- Location of Pritchard in British Columbia
- Coordinates: 50°40′59″N 119°49′04″W
- Country: Canada
- Province: British Columbia
- Region: Thompson Country
- Regional district: Thompson-Nicola
- Elevation: 360 m (1,180 ft)
- Time zone: UTC−07:00 (PT)
- Postal code span: V0E 2P0
- Area codes: 250, 778, 236, & 672
- Highways: Highway 1
- Waterways: South Thompson River

Pritchard is an unincorporated community straddling the South Thompson River in the Thompson region of south central British Columbia. Northeast of the BC Highway 97 intersection on BC Highway 1, the locality is by road about 19 kilometres (12 mi) west of Chase and 39 kilometres (24 mi) east of Kamloops.

== Pioneer settlers ==
James Todd and George Bohun Martin were employees of the Hudson's Bay Company (HBC). Todd pre-empted about 3 kilometres (2 mi) on the south side shore eastward from the present bridge. In 1866, Martin took over Todd's land. Adjacent, Jean Laveau briefly settled to the east, at what became Laveau Creek, and Edward de Champs to the west at what became Neds Creek.

On the north shore, opposite the Martin holding, Arthur Gore Pemberton settled. Preston Bennett and Moses Lumby, who bought south of Martin in 1867, sold this adjoining property to Martin in 1870. To serve paddle steamers, a large wharf was built in the 1860s about 183 metres (600 ft) east from the present bridge. The 1885 arrival of the Canadian Pacific Railway (CP) brought a flood of new settlers.

== Martin Prairie ==
In the hills south of his farm, George Martin ranged his cattle. Later, his children Frank, George and Henry established farms in the hills. Initially called Martin's Prairie, the amended spelling emerged in due course. In 1892, Amos and Alfred Herbert established the first homestead. In 1908, the first school for the general area opened. In 1911, the Farmers' Institute was formed and fire destroyed the log school. The next year, a larger lumber building opened. Robert Brett operated a sawmill 1914–1922. When the school closed in 1953, students were bussed to Pritchard.

== Pritchard name origin ==
About 4 kilometres (2 mi) east was Watmore siding. Watmore came to describe an area along the railway line that encompassed present day Pritchard. Consequently, the school which opened in 1908 immediately east of the wharf was called Watmore.

The railway point at Pritchard may have been first called Pemberton Spur (after Arthur G. Pemberton). In September 1907, John G. Fawcett sold Walter P. Pritchard a property on the south shore. Until 1912, Pritchard drove the Vernon–Kamloops stage.

In the 1911 post office application, the Martin Prairie Farmers' Institute unanimously chose the name Pritchard.

== Pritchard earlier community ==
Mrs. A.R. Johnstone was the inaugural postmaster 1911–1911, followed by W.P. Pritchard 1912–1927.

In 1912, John Hutchinson, built a two-storey house immediately west of the present bridge. The store on the lower level was taken over by daughter Nellie Boyde, when John, a resident for only a year, died months later.

Pritchard built a three-storey hotel/boarding house in 1912 about 152 metres (500 ft) east of the present railway crossing, which opened in January 1913. The building comprised 14 bedrooms, a general store, and relocated post office.

The annual fall fairs were held 1913 to the early 1920s. In 1948, Wing Howe bought the hotel, which he immediately closed to the public but became accommodation for Chinese workers.

Being subject to flooding, the Watmore school site was vacated in 1936. Renamed Pritchard, the new school opened that year at 1563 Martin Prairie Rd, about 400 metres (437 yd) up from the highway.

In 1950, BC Hydro transmission lines introduced electricity to the area.

In 1957, a teacherage was erected.

In 1965, the establishment of an automatic telephone exchange at Chase introduced dial calling to the Pritchard area.

In 1968, the school closed and the students were bussed to Chase. Formed in 1969, the community association took control of the building as a community hall. In 1972, the abandoned hotel building was demolished and burned.

== Pemberton Range ==
On the benches north of his farm, Arthur Pemberton ranged his cattle. Soon the name changed from Hog Range to Pemberton Range. His 1,200-hectare (3,000-acre) property stretched eastward to Hoffman's Bluff.

In 1909, B.C. Orchards purchased about 810 hectares (2,000 acres) of the holding on the understanding that J.H. Kilmer would in turn acquire the property. When Kilmer was unable to meet the second installment in June 1910, B.C. Orchards sold the property to Messrs. Ross and Shaw after the notice of cancellation expired. The forfeiture was overturned by the lower court, but the British Columbia Court of Appeal reversed that decision. In 1913, the Privy Council upheld the lower court decision. The lack of water rights dashed the plan to subdivide the land into orchards.

A school existed 1913–1965. After burning down in 1929, the school was rebuilt with more windows.

Also acknowledging the name are Pemberton Hill, Pemberton Creek, Pemberton Lake, and Pemberton Gulch. An irrigation ditch from the lake brought water to the Pemberton farm.

In 1966, electricity transmission extended into the area.

== Railway ==
In August 1885, the eastward advance of the CP rail head passed through the locality, regular service having started as far east as Kamloops the previous month.

In 1911, the 13.37 by 4.72 metres (43 ft 10 in × 15 ft 6 in) train station building was erected.

In the 1940s, stockyards were erected at the western end of the siding.

== Ferry, bridge, and roads ==
In the early years, a cross river scow ferry connected to the Pemberton Ranch.

A subsidised ferry was established in 1912. To prevent drifting downriver, a guide cable was installed in 1913.

In 1920, a 40-metre (132 ft) timber swing span with 300 metres (1,000 ft) of trestle approaches replaced the ferry. A fixed span replaced the swing section in 1931, which in turn was replaced in the 1933/34 winter by a lift span to restore navigability to the river. The present one-lane arched trestle bridge, built in 1985, is high enough to allow the passage of a sternwheeler. The Wanda Sue passed by on river tours 1984–2004.

The road which ran to the Martin Ranch on the north side of the train track, past the station, hotel, wharf road, and ferry road, became disused beyond the station after 1950.

In 1874, the Shuswap Wagon Rd was built from Ducks (Monte Creek) to Chase. The right-of-way through the vicinity was present Stoney Flats Rd. In 1925, the route was realigned lower to Stewart Rd. In 1948–49, it was upgraded to highway status. Establishing a bypass around Pritchard, the widening of the highway from two to four lanes was completed for Monte Creek–Pritchard around 2014 and Pritchard–Hoffman's Bluff in 2016.

== Later community ==
Census population: Pritchard
Year	Pop.	±%
1951	145	—
1956	142	−2.1%
1961	43	−69.7%
1966	111	+158.1%
1971		—
1976	287	—
1981		—
1986	328	—
1991	780	+137.8%
Source: Statistics Canada * Later online census figures do not split out Pritchard

On the north shore west of the bridge, the first phase of the subdivision (comprising 38 lots of 930 square metres (10,000 ft^{2})), was ratified in January 1972. Approval of the second phase (62 lots) was that November and the third phase (70 lots) was September 1976. Multi-use residential zoning allowed single family duplex or single wide mobile homes. By 1976, problems with wastewater drainage were evident. Launched by Pritchard Developments, the properties were later marketed as flat serviced lots, paved roads, and suitable for mobile homes. By 1998, 144 homes stood on these lots.

Installed in 1972, the water supply infrastructure was upgraded in 2010. A further upgrade went out to tender in 2022.

In 1989, the shell of the new 370-square-metre (4,000 ft^{2}) community hall was erected at 1714 Duck Range Road. Around 1992, the interior was completed. In 1993, the Pritchard voluntary fire department was established.

Although rodeo schools were held for a couple of years in the mid-1970s and a rodeo held in the mid-1980s, the annual Pritchard Rodeo did not commence until 1994. In 2016, a new grandstand replaced the old one at the Pritchard Rodeo Grounds.

The wastewater treatment plant, constructed during 1997–1998 for the Pritchard Developments subdivision, was upgraded in the mid-2010s.

Immediately northwest of the bridge, Riverside Living is a planned 65-unit manufactured home development. During the 2010s, most of the 24 units of the first phase were erected. In 2013, a district waste transfer station opened.

Agriculture and horse stables primarily make up the local economy. A gas station stands adjacent to the general store/post office. The Pritchard Evangelical Free Church holds Sunday services in the community hall. Pritchard Provincial Park is to the east on the north shore.

One estimate puts the 2021 population as 1,500 for the general area. Based on the increase in housing stock since the 1991 census, the 2021 Pritchard population should number about 1,000.
