= Ashcroft-Cache Creek-Clinton Transit System =

Transit system in British Columbia, Canada

Ashcroft-Cache Creek-Clinton Regional Transit System
- Service area: Ashcroft, Cache Creek, Clinton, 100 Mile House and Kamloops
- Service type: bus service, paratransit
- Alliance: BC Transit
- Routes: 3
- Website: www.bctransit.com/ashcroft-cache-creek-clinton/

Ashcroft-Cache Creek-Clinton Transit System provides transit services in the Thompson-Nicola Regional District of British Columbia. The system is served by community shuttle-type buses from Monday to Friday.

== Routes ==
=== Scheduled services ===
In 2013, Cache Creek decided to stop service to its town, meaning buses between Ashcroft and Clinton passed through the aforementioned town without stopping. In 2017, 100 Mile house began being served once weekly for access to medical professionals. In 2019, Cache Creek rejoined the transit system. Scheduled services previously occurred two days a week, though have now been increased to two daily services.

Route	Route Name	Type	Areas Served	Scheduling	Notes
1	Ashcroft-Cache Creek-Clinton	Regional	Ashcroft, Cache Creek, Clinton	Wednesday and Friday	Twice daily

=== Paratransit ===
On the first three Mondays of a month, request service is offered to Kamloops, and once a month to 100 Mile House. This is on a different day than the Health Connections bus operate.

=== BC Transit Health Connections ===
All three of the towns served by the system are also served, at differing levels of service, by the BC Transit Health Connections service.
