= Campbell River Transit System =

Public transit system

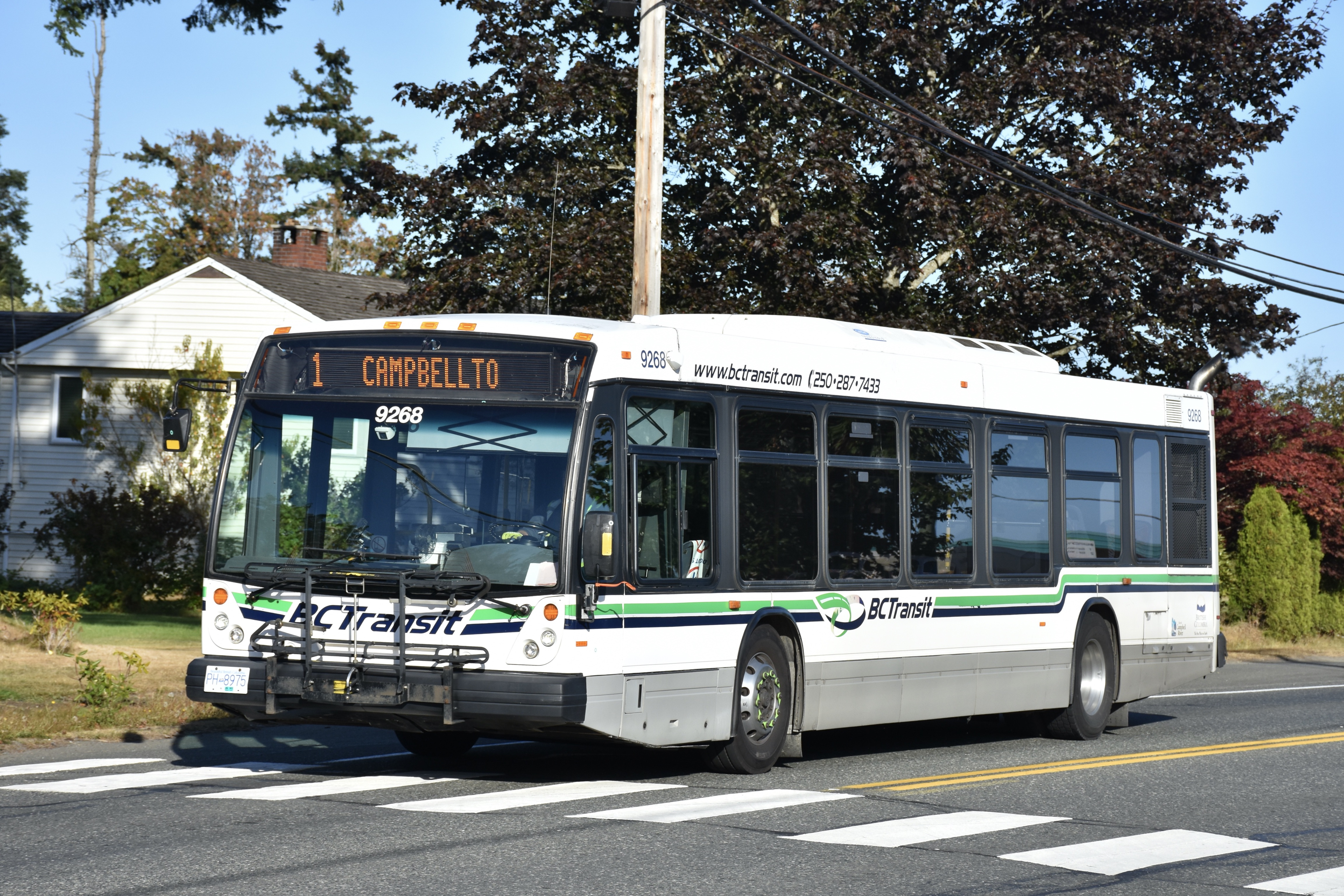
- Campbell River Transit Nova LFS 9268 on route 1
- Parent: BC Transit
- Headquarters: 1235 Evergreen Road
- Locale: Campbell River, BC
- Service area: City of Campbell River
- Service type: bus service, paratransit
- Alliance: BC Transit
- Routes: 9
- Destinations: Oyster Bay, Willow Point, North Island College, Downtown Campbell River, Discovery Mall, & Willow Point
- Hubs: Campbellton, Willow Point, Community Centre
- Fleet: 12 Conventional buses, 4 HandyDART buses
- Fuel type: Diesel for Conventional fleet, gas for Community Bus plus Paratransit fleet
- Operator: Keolis Canada
- Website: Campbell River Transit System

Campbell River Transit System provides public transportation to the city of Campbell River, on the east coast of Vancouver Island, British Columbia. Service also extends to Oyster Bay-Buttle Lake, under an agreement with the Strathcona Regional District. Most transit buses are low floor wheelchair accessible and come equipped with bike racks. Transportation for people whose disability prevents them from using conventional bus service is provided by HandyDART service for eligible registered users.

== Operations ==
=== Fleet ===
- ARBOCFreedom
- New Flyer Industries D40LF (Retired)
- Alexander Dennis Pointer (30 ft and 35 ft)
- Grande West Vicinity (30 ft and 35 ft)
- Nova Bus LFS

== See also ==
- Public transport in Canada
