= Scotch Creek (British Columbia) =

Stream in the British Columbia, Canada

Coordinates: 50°54′37″N 119°30′19″W

Scotch Creek is a stream in the British Columbia Interior of Canada, located on the north side of Shuswap Lake. It is part of the Thompson River watershed, which is a tributary to the Fraser River. It flows from the Shuswap Highlands into Shuswap Lake just west of the community of Scotch Creek. It was named for Scottish gold prospectors who worked the creek with placer mining operations in the 1860s. The creek's headwaters are near Pukeshun Mountain, and flow southwest and south for 56.5 kilometres (35.1 mi). The creek supports sockeye salmon, which breed in the creek during a small salmon run in the autumn. The salmon run usually sees between 1,000 and 18,000 fish return to the river.
