= BC Transit =

Provincial Crown corporation responsible for public transportation in British Columbia

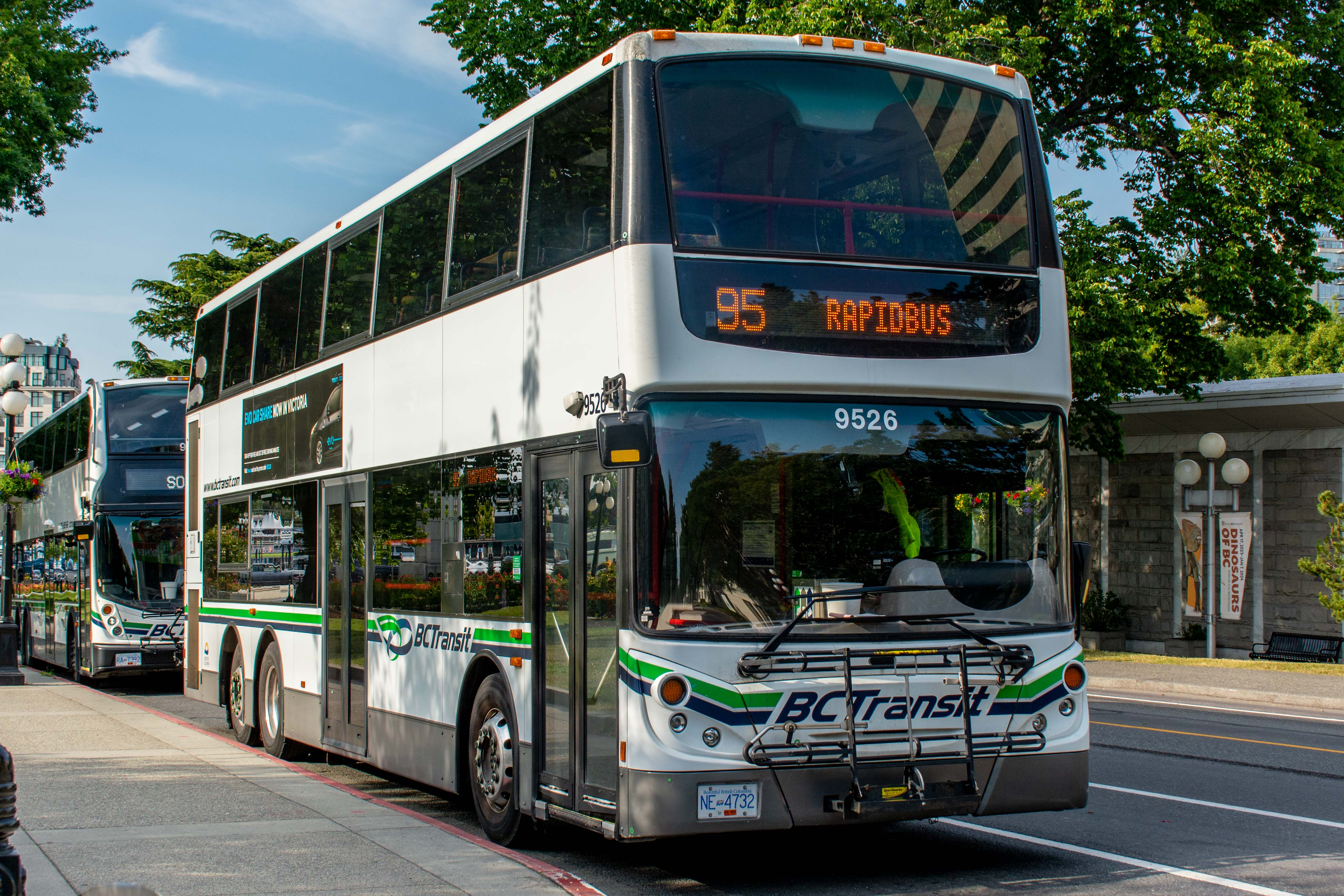
- BC Transit double-decker bus seen in Victoria
- Formerly: Urban Transit Authority and the Metro Transit Operating Company
- Founded: 1983; 43 years ago
- Headquarters: 520 Gorge Road East; Victoria, British Columbia
- Locale: Province of British Columbia (except Greater Vancouver)
- Service area: 130 communities
- Service type: bus service, paratransit, transportation planning
- Fleet: 1,128 vehicles
- Annual ridership: 27.0 million (FY 2020/21)
- Annual budget: $370 million
- Website: www.bctransit.com

BC Transit is a provincial Crown corporation responsible for coordinating the delivery of public transportation within British Columbia, Canada, outside Greater Vancouver. BC Transit is headquartered in Victoria, British Columbia. In 2025, the system had a ridership of 26,557,500, or about 132,600 per weekday as of the second quarter of 2026.

BC Transit is the successor to the British Columbia Electric Railway, which started in 1897 and in 1961 became BC Hydro, as the BC Hydro and Power Authority. In 1979, the province separated the transit authority into a separate agency called the Urban Transit Authority which was later restructured into BC Transit in 1983.

BC Transit carries out overall planning and delivery for all of the different municipal transit systems in British Columbia. In 1999, responsibility for the management of transportation in Greater Vancouver, including public transit, was taken over by the newly formed TransLink. In the future, TransLink's jurisdiction is planned to expand into adjacent regions east and north of Greater Vancouver (see TransLink 2007 reorganization).

== History ==
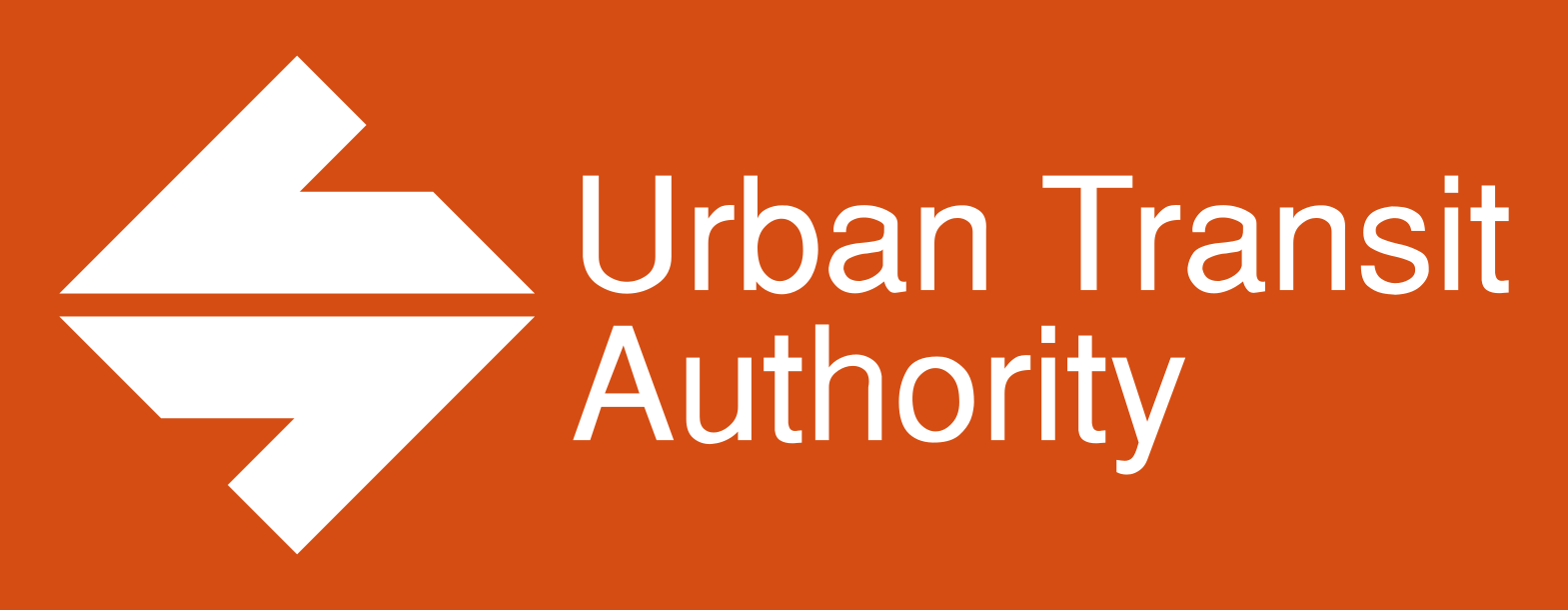
The logo of the Urban Transit Authority, the predecessor of BC Transit

Pre-2000 logo

In 1896, the Consolidated Railway Company was formed, taking over ten other companies engaged in electric light rail systems, or tramways, and electric lighting in Vancouver, Victoria, and New Westminster. The following year, in 1897, the BC Electric Railway was incorporated to take over the property and business of the Consolidated Railway Company. In the 1930s and 1940s, the electric streetcars and interurban trams were converted to trolleybuses and gas-powered buses, as part of the BCER's "From Rails to Rubber" program. In 1961, the province took over the BCER through the BC Hydro Act, forming the British Columbia Hydro and Power Authority as a crown corporation.

In 1979, the province's Livable Region Plan led to the transfer of transit responsibilities to three agencies: the Greater Vancouver Regional District (GVRD) was to be responsible for transit policy and planning; the Urban Transit Authority (UTA), to represent provincial government interests in public transit; and the Metro Transit Operating Company (MTOC), a separate crown corporation that took over operations from BC Hydro. The new structure was meant to provide local governments with more decision-making power and funding of their local systems.

In 1983, BC Transit was created when the province merged the UTA and MTOC, removing the role of GVRD. Regional transit commissions were created in Vancouver and Victoria, tasked with approving local tariffs, planning, and some funding.

In 1999, the responsibility for the transit system in Greater Vancouver was reassigned to TransLink, which had been founded a year earlier. The rest of BC still remains under BC Transit.

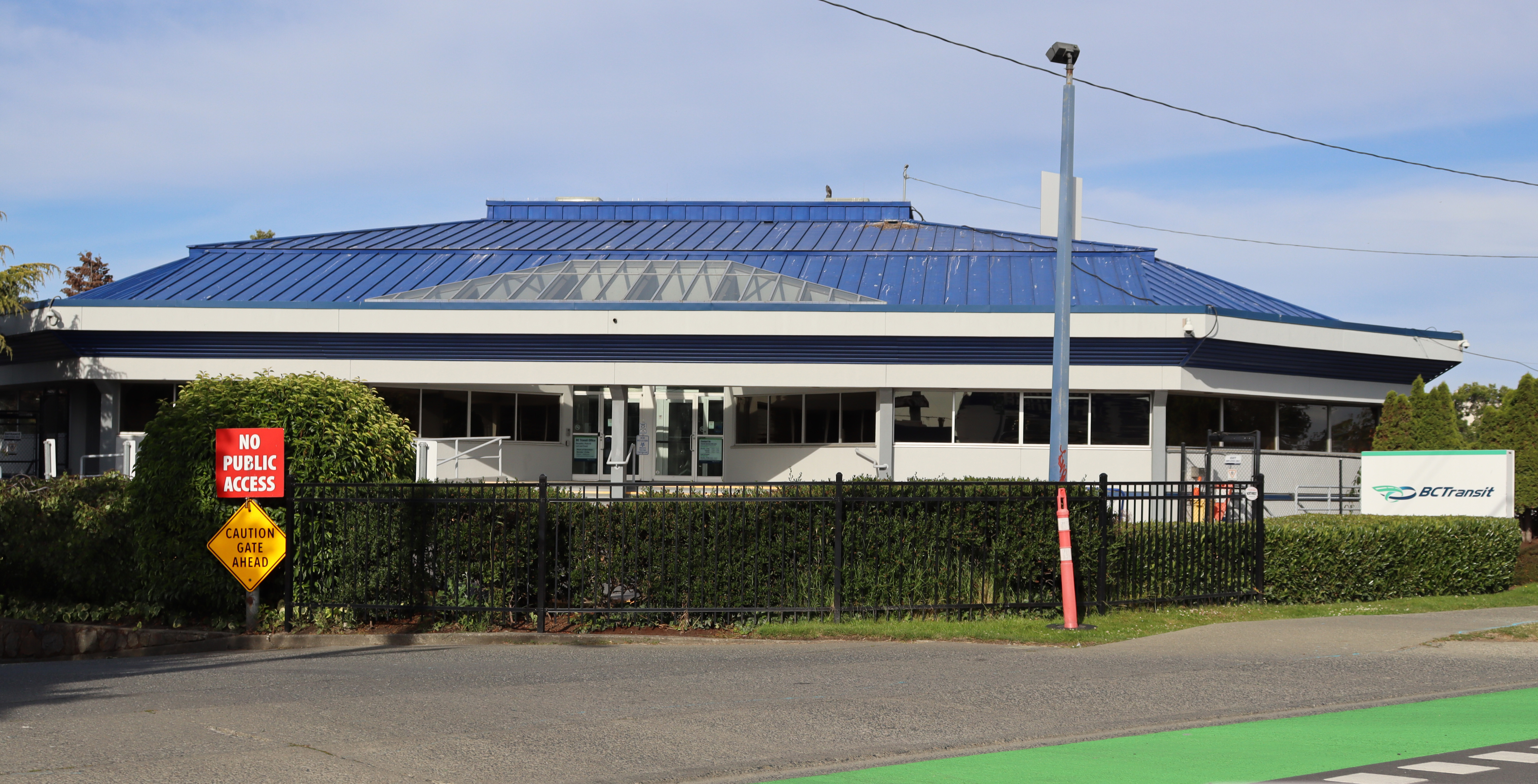
The BC Transit headquarters building in Victoria

In 2000, BC Transit became one of the first transit systems in North America to use double-decker buses, which were also low-floor.

After Greyhound Canada ended all services in western Canada, BC Transit began the operation of BC Bus North, its first dedicated intercity buses in Northern British Columbia, in 2018.

In 2019, to address rising concerns of driver safety, the installation of driver safety doors on all buses began. The first bus with this modification was in Victoria.

In 2020, during the COVID-19 pandemic, BC Transit went to a province-wide free-fare operation and required boarding through the rear door of buses with multiple doors. This lasted just over two months, with fares and front-door boarding resuming on in June of the same year.

== Transit systems ==
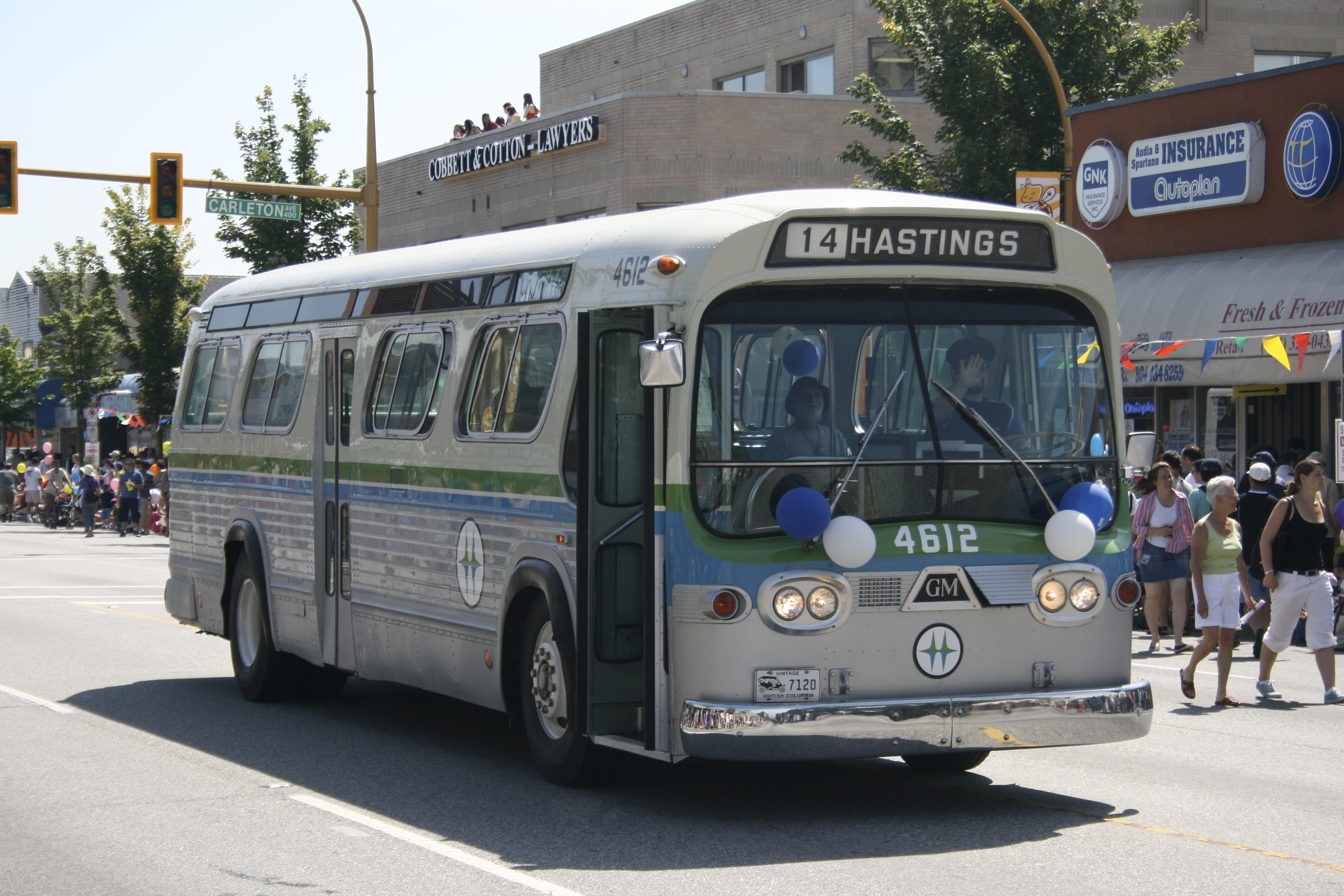
BC Hydro markings on a 1964 GMC bus

The Victoria Regional Transit System, in the provincial capital of Victoria, is the only system operated by BC Transit itself. Beyond Victoria, there are regional transit systems. In four locations (Nanaimo, Nelson, Powell River, and the Sunshine Coast), the municipality operates the service, while private operators are contracted to deliver the transit services elsewhere.

=== Regional transit systems ===
- 100 Mile House
- Agassiz-Harrison
- Ashcroft-Cache Creek-Clinton
- Bella Coola
- Boundary
- Burns Lake
- Campbell River
- Central Fraser Valley
- Chilliwack
- Clearwater
- Columbia Valley
- Comox Valley
- Cowichan Valley
- Cranbrook
- Creston Valley
- Dawson Creek
- Elk Valley
- Fort St. John
- Hazeltons
- Kamloops
- Kelowna
- Kimberley
- Kitimat
- Merritt
- Mount Waddington
- Nanaimo
- Pemberton Valley
- Port Alberni
- Port Edward
- Powell River
- Prince George
- Prince Rupert
- Princeton
- Quesnel
- Revelstoke
- Salt Spring Island
- Shuswap
- Skeena
- Smithers
- South Okanagan-Similkameen (Penticton)
- Squamish
- Summerland
- Sunshine Coast
- Terrace
- Vernon
- Victoria (only system operated directly by BC Transit)
- West Coast Transit (Tofino-Ucluelet)
- West Kootenay
- Whistler
- Williams Lake

=== HandyDART ===
HandyDART is an accessible transit service in British Columbia that uses vans or small buses to transport disabled or elderly passengers who cannot use the normal transit system. This service provides door-to-door service and is available in all of the province's larger centres, as well as in many smaller communities. There are 16 custom accessible transit systems.

=== BC Bus North ===
BC Transit operates a limited intercity service with a hub in Prince George, serving as a replacement for connections lost when Greyhound ceased operations in Western Canada. While it bears no BC Transit markings, it receives funding for operations and its scheduling, routing, and organization is guided by BC Transit.

=== Health Connections ===
BC Transit operates small interregional buses on infrequent schedules to primarily serve patients in rural areas needing access to health care facilities in larger urban centres, but makes the service available to all members of the public. The Health Connections network focuses on the Cariboo, Fraser Canyon, South Okanagan, Columbia and West Kootenays areas. These services, while scheduled, are not listed in standard riders guides as published by local agencies.
