= Lew Campbell =

Lewis Campbell (c. 1831–1910) was a pioneer rancher in the Kamloops area of western Canada. Campbell and James Todd were the first settlers in what is now Barnhartvale, British Columbia.

Campbell went to British Columbia from the United States during the Cariboo Gold Rush in 1858, but unlike many others he discovered more profit in transporting supplies and food for the miners than in actually prospecting for gold. In 1864 he drove a herd of cattle from Oregon to the Cariboo, selling the beef to the miners. In 1865 he pre-empted a crown grant at the mouth of Campbell Creek on the South Thompson River. The Campbell Ranch influenced Barnhartvale for many years.

Campbell's ranch eventually included 3,000 cattle on a property of 969 acres (3.92 km^{2}), spreading south about twelve miles (19 km) to Campbell Lake and the surrounding meadows.

Campbell Creek and Campbell Range are both named after him.

== Sources ==
- Balf, Mary, "Kamloops: a History of the District up to 1914" (Kamloops Museum Archives, Kamloops, 1969; pp 123–127)
- Favrholdt, Ken, "Lewis Campbell" (Kamloops Daily News, Friday, August 19, 1986)
- Bulman, Alex T., Kamloops Cattlemen: One Hundred Years of Trail Dust! (Sono Nis Press, Victoria, 1972; pp 18–21)
