= Nanaimo Regional Transit System =

Transit system of Nanaimo, Canada

Regional District of Nanaimo Transit System
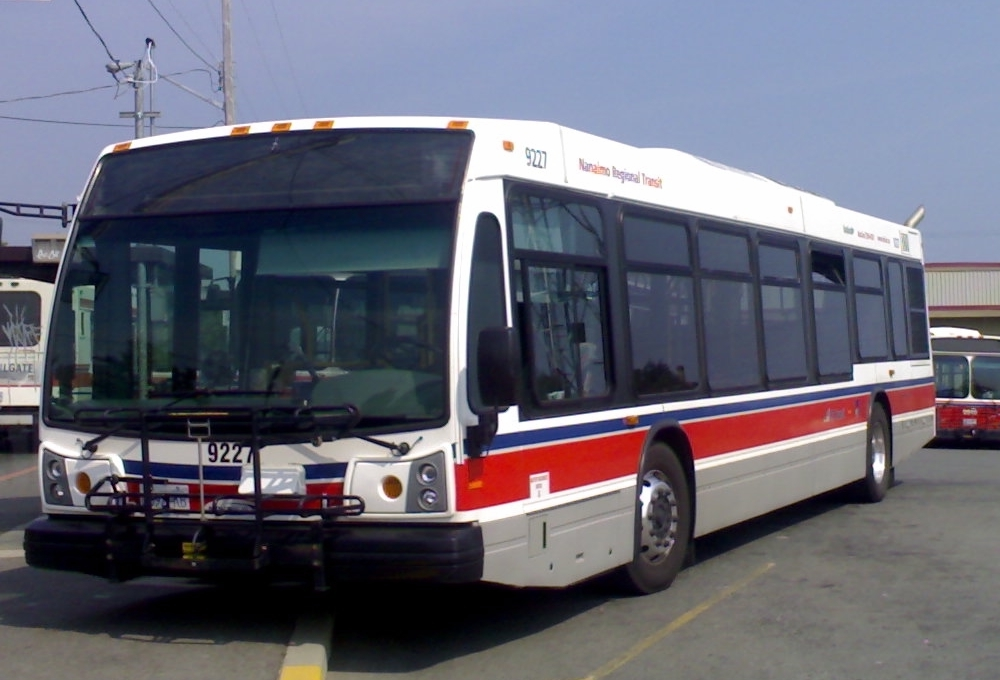
- Founded: 1969
- Headquarters: 6300 Hammond Bay Road
- Locale: Nanaimo
- Service type: Bus service, Paratransit
- Alliance: BC Transit
- Fleet: 51
- Fuel type: CNG
- Operator: Regional District of Nanaimo
- Website: Regional Transit & Nanaimo Home

Regional District of Nanaimo Transit System provides both conventional bus service and special needs paratransit services within the Regional District of Nanaimo in British Columbia, Canada. The system, operated by the Regional Transportation Services Department, is jointly funded by BC Transit, the provincial agency responsible for transit services outside Metro Vancouver.

== Services ==
As of 2023, there are 20 scheduled bus routes in the region. The transit system operates seven days a week, with reduced service on weekends and holidays. All accessible buses are also equipped with bike racks. In rural areas the buses can be flagged down, as there are no designated bus stops. Passengers who are worried about their personal safety at night can ask the driver to drop them off between regular bus stops.

=== Regular routes ===
In September 2015, many of the original routes were renumbered so that all the routes between the now-superseded Prideaux Exchange in Downtown and Woodgrove Centre would end in a zero. Routes 12 and 93 were discontinued due to low ridership, while Route 40 (formerly Route 4) was extended to Woodgrove Centre and its circulation was increased to every 15-30 minutes during peak hours.

No.	Name	Route
1	Nanaimo Rapid Line	Express along the Island Highway from Downtown Nanaimo, Terminal Park, Country Club Exchange, Woodgrove Exchange. Numbered 50 from 2015-2025, and 8/9 from 2002-15
5	Fairview	Downtown Nanaimo, Harewood, Vancouver Island University, Jingle Pot/Westwood
6	Harewood	Downtown Nanaimo, Harewood, University Village, Vancouver Island University
7	Cinnabar	Downtown Nanaimo, South Parkway Plaza, Cinnabar Valley
8	Cedar/VIU	Vancouver Island University, Harewood, University Village, South Parkway Plaza, Cedar
9	Intercity	Qualicum Beach, Parksville, Woodgrove Exchange. Previously numbered 91 from 2015-25, 90 from 2005-15, and 21 prior to 2005
15/15A	VIU Connector/VIU Connector via Jingle Pot	Vancouver Island University, Woodgrove Exchange with 15A trips going down the entire length of Jingle Pot Road at certain times on weekdays.
20/20A	Hammond Bay/Dover	Downtown, BC Ferries Departure Bay Terminal, Brooks Landing Centre, Departure Bay, Hammond Bay, Woodgrove Exchange. 20A trips go along Brickyard (toward Woodgrove)/McGirr (toward Downtown) and Dover Rd. Some trips divert to Country Club
25	Ferry Shuttle	Woodgrove Exchange, Country Club Exchange, Northfield area, Departure Bay Ferry Terminal, Downtown Nanaimo, select trips go to Hullo Ferry Terminal
30	NRGH (Nanaimo Regional General Hospital)	Downtown Nanaimo, Bowen Road, Nanaimo Regional Hospital, Northfield, Country Club Exchange, Metral Drive, Woodgrove Exchange
31	Lantzville	Woodgrove Exchange to Lantzville via Aulds and Philip to Eastwind/Northwind area then back to Woodgrove Exchange via Superior, Island Hwy, Lantzville, Dickinson, and Dover. Numbered 11 from 2015-25, and 10 prior to 2015
40	VIU Express	Downtown Nanaimo, University Village, Vancouver Island University, Bowen Road, Northfield area, Country Club Exchange, Nanaimo North Town Centre via Uplands Road, Woodgrove Exchange
70 NCX	Nanaimo Cowichan Express	Downtown Nanaimo, Nanaimo Airport, Ladysmith, Duncan. Interregional express route
72	Country Club/Downtown	Downtown Nanaimo, Townsite Rd, Terminal Park Mall, Brooks Landing Centre, Country Club Exchange. Numbered 1 prior to 2025, and travelled to Woodgrove prior to 2015 using sections of what are now routes 40 and 30.
78	Cassidy/Airport	Downtown Nanaimo, South Parkway Plaza, South Wellington, Cassidy, Nanaimo Airport. Weekdays only
88	Parksville	Parksville area, Wembley Centre. Runs Monday through Saturday
92	Hammond Bay	Once-daily route for Dover Bay Secondary students. Only runs on weekdays between September and June.
97	Eaglecrest	Circular route running in a counterclockwise direction through eastern portions of Qualicum Beach and areas just outside the town boundaries. Runs Monday through Saturday
98	Qualicum Beach	Circuitous route running in a figure-8 through western Qualicum Beach. Runs Monday through Saturday
99	Deep Bay	From Ravensong Exchange in Qualicum Beach to Deep Bay. Now daily, with twice-a-day connections to the Comox Valley Transit System daily except Sundays.

=== Paratransit ===
handyDART is a dial-a-ride service for people with a disability that is sufficiently severe that they are unable to use regular transit buses without assistance. Clients must be pre-registered to make use of this service.
