= Dallas, Kamloops =

Coordinates: 50°40′00″N 120°10′00″W

Dallas is a neighbourhood of the City of Kamloops, British Columbia, Canada. It has an urban area separated from the Kamloops population centre, with a population of 4,445 as of the Canada 2011 Census.

== Name origin ==
It was named for Dallas Johnston (1887–1964), who farmed land east of Kamloops until its purchase for the Veterans' Land Act settlement.
