= Columbia and Kootenay Railway =

Railway in British Columbia, Canada

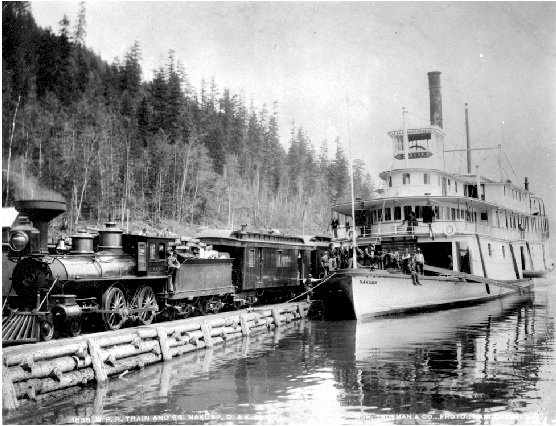
Sternwheeler Nakusp at Robson, BC, (also known as Sproats Landing) meeting train of Columbia and Kootenay Railway on inclined wharf, circa 1896.

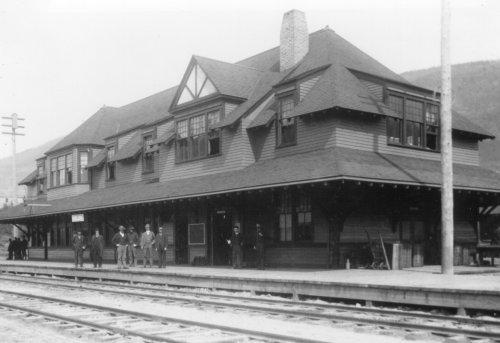
Canadian Pacific railway station in Nelson, British Columbia

The Columbia and Kootenay Railway (C&KR) was a historic railway operated by the Canadian Pacific Railway (CPR) in the West Kootenay region of British Columbia. This 25-mile (40 km) route, beside the unnavigable Kootenay River, linked Nelson on the west arm of Kootenay Lake with Robson at the confluence of the Kootenay River and the Columbia River near Castlegar.

== C&KR lines ==
Opened in 1891, the railway was chartered by a CPR official and immediately leased for 999 years to the CPR. The CPR built this initial link to capture mining traffic heading southward by steamboat to the US. At Robson, CPR steamers sailed up the Arrow Lakes and the Columbia River to connect with its mainline at Revelstoke. However, low water and ice on the Arrow Lakes made the water route unreliable.

In 1897, the CPR built a branch line from South Slocan up the Slocan Valley to Slocan City on the shore of Slocan Lake. Boats moved railway cars and loose freight to the north end of the lake, which connected with its Nakusp and Slocan Railway for transportation to Nakusp, from where boats sailed north to Revelstoke. This branch also provided a connection to the rich mining region around Sandon. This branch was abandoned in 1993 and became the Slocan Valley Rail Trail.

== Connecting lines ==
In 1898, to the west, CPR bought the Columbia and Western Railway, and rebuilt to standard gauge the next year. In 1900, to the east, CPR built its Procter branch along the west arm of Kootenay Lake. These sections would eventually form part of the CPR's southern mainline through British Columbia, now abandoned westward from about 8 kilometres (5 mi) west of Castlegar.
