= West Kootenay Transit System =

- Headquarters: Nelson, Suite 101 – 310 Ward Street; Trail, 8170 Old Waneta Rd.
- Locale: Nelson, BC; Castlegar, BC, Trail, BC
- Service type: bus service, paratransit
- Alliance: BC Transit
- Destinations: Trail, Castlegar, Nelson
- Operator: BC Transit
- Website: BC Transit - West Kootenay Transit System

West Kootenay Transit System (formerly known as Kootenay Boundary Transit System) is the public transit system in Trail, Castlegar, Nelson, British Columbia and surrounding area. The transit services are operated from Trail, Castlegar, Nelson and serve Rossland, Warfield, Genelle, Montrose, Fruitvale, Salmo, Kaslo, Creston, Nakusp. Funding is provided under a partnership between the Regional District of Kootenay Boundary, Regional District of Central Kootenay and BC Transit. handyDART provides door-to-door transportation for people whose disability prevents them from using conventional bus service.

West Kootenay Transit System introduced a transit run between the Cities of Trail, Castlegar and Nelson, mainly to serve those travelling to Selkirk College's Castlegar Campus. This run is operational between the months of September and June and can be used for general transportation between the communities of Trail, Castlegar and Nelson.

== Routes ==
The transit system has three zones (Columbia, Kootenay and Slocan) and over 30 routes serving the region of Regional District of Kootenay Boundary, including a connecting bus service to Castlegar, Nelson, Nakusp and Kaslo, in the adjoining Regional District of Central Kootenay.

Regional Connectors

Kootenay Zone

- 1 Uphill
- 2 Fairview
- 3 Rosemont
- 4 Nelson Airport
- 10 North Shore
- 14 Blewett
- 99 Kootenay Connector

Slocan Zone

- 20 Slocan Valley

Columbia Zone (Castlegar and Area)

- 31 North Castlegar
- 32 Columbia
- 33 Selkirk
- 34 Kinnaird
- 36 Ootischenia
- 38 Playmor

Columbia Zone (Trail and Area)

- 41 Binns
- 42 Columbia Heights
- 43 Glenmerry/Fruitvale
- 44 Sunningdale
- 45 Teck
- 46 Rossland
- 48 Red Mountain Ski Bus

Nakusp and Kaslo Local Paratransit

- 51 Nakusp – Hot Springs
- 52 Nakusp – New Denver – Silverton
- 53 Nakusp – Edgewood
- 57 Kaslo Local
- 58 Kaslo – Argenta

Health Connections

- 72 Salmo – Nelson
- 74 Nakusp – Nelson
- 76 Kaslo – Nelson

== See also ==
- Public transport in Canada
