= List of public transit authorities in Canada =

In the month of November 2015 ridership of Canadian large urban transit was 142.7 million passenger trips.

The following is a list of public transit authorities in Canada.

Municipality or region	Province	Population (2021)	Bus	Rapid transit	Regional/commuter rail
Toronto	Ontario	2,794,356	Toronto Transit Commission (includes TTC streetcars)	Toronto subway	GO Transit
Metro Vancouver	British Columbia	2,642,825	TransLink	SkyTrain, RapidBus	West Coast Express
Montreal	Quebec	1,762,949	Société de transport de Montréal	Montreal Metro, Pie-IX BRT	Exo, Réseau express métropolitain
Calgary	Alberta	1,306,784	Calgary Transit	CTrain, MAX	
York Region	Ontario	1,173,334	York Region Transit	Toronto subway, Viva Rapid Transit	GO Transit
Ottawa	Ontario	1,017,449	OC Transpo	O-Train, Ottawa Transitway	
Edmonton	Alberta	1,010,899	Edmonton Transit Service	Edmonton LRT	
Winnipeg	Manitoba	749,607	Winnipeg Transit	Winnipeg RT	
Mississauga	Ontario	717,961	MiWay	Mississauga Transitway	GO Transit
Durham Region	Ontario	696,992	Durham Region Transit	DRT Pulse	GO Transit
Brampton	Ontario	656,480	Brampton Transit	Züm	GO Transit
Waterloo Region	Ontario	587,165	Grand River Transit	Ion rapid transit	GO Transit
Hamilton	Ontario	569,353	Hamilton Street Railway		GO Transit
Quebec City	Quebec	549,459	Réseau de transport de la Capitale	Métrobus	
Halifax	Nova Scotia	439,819	Halifax Transit		
Laval	Quebec	438,366	Société de transport de Laval	Montreal Metro, Pie-IX BRT	Exo
London	Ontario	422,324	London Transit		
Greater Victoria	British Columbia	397,237	Victoria Regional Transit System	Blink RapidBus	
Gatineau	Quebec	291,041	Société de transport de l'Outaouais	Rapibus	
Saskatoon	Saskatchewan	266,141	Saskatoon Transit		
Longueuil	Quebec	254,483	Réseau de transport de Longueuil	Montreal Metro	Exo
Windsor	Ontario	229,660	Transit Windsor		
Regina	Saskatchewan	226,404	Regina Transit		
Greater Kelowna	British Columbia	222,162	Kelowna Regional Transit System	RapidBus	
Oakville	Ontario	213,759	Oakville Transit		GO Transit
St. John's region	Newfoundland and Labrador	212,579	Metrobus Transit		
Burlington	Ontario	186,948	Burlington Transit		GO Transit
Sherbrooke	Quebec	172,950	Société de transport de Sherbrooke		
Greater Sudbury	Ontario	166,004	GOVA		
Greater Moncton	New Brunswick	157,717	Codiac Transpo		
Abbotsford	British Columbia	153,524	Central Fraser Valley Transit System		
Lévis	Quebec	149,683	Société de transport de Lévis		
Barrie	Ontario	147,829	Barrie Transit		GO Transit
Saguenay	Quebec	144,723	Société de transport du Saguenay		
Guelph	Ontario	143,740	Guelph Transit		GO Transit
Trois-Rivières	Quebec	139,163	Société de transport de Trois-Rivières		
St. Catharines	Ontario	136,803	Niagara Region Transit		GO Transit
Milton	Ontario	132,979	Milton Transit		GO Transit
Kingston	Ontario	132,485	Kingston Transit		
Greater Saint John	New Brunswick	130,613	Saint John Transit		
Annapolis Valley	Nova Scotia	129,306	Kings Transit		
Thunder Bay	Ontario	108,843	Thunder Bay Transit		
Brantford	Ontario	104,688	Brantford Transit		
Chatham-Kent	Ontario	103,988	CK Transit		
Red Deer	Alberta	100,844	Red Deer Transit		
Nanaimo	British Columbia	99,863	Nanaimo Regional Transit System		
Strathcona County	Alberta	99,225	Strathcona County Transit		
Lethbridge	Alberta	98,406	Lethbridge Transit		
Kamloops	British Columbia	97,902	Kamloops Transit System		
Saint-Jean-sur-Richelieu	Quebec	97,873	Saint-Jean-sur-Richelieu transport en commun		
Niagara Falls	Ontario	94,415	Niagara Region Transit		GO Transit
Cape Breton Region	Nova Scotia	93,694	Transit Cape Breton		
Chilliwack	British Columbia	93,203	Chilliwack/Agassiz-Harrison Transit System		
North Okanagan	British Columbia	91,610	Vernon Regional Transit System		
Cowichan Valley	British Columbia	89,013	Cowichan Valley Regional Transit System		
Peterborough	Ontario	83,651	Peterborough Transit		
Saint-Jérôme	Quebec	80,213	Exo Secteur Laurentides		
Drummondville	Quebec	79,258	Commission de transport de Drummondville		
Greater Charlottetown	Prince Edward Island	78,858	T3 Transit		
Prince George	British Columbia	76,708	Prince George Transit System		
Airdrie	Alberta	74,100	Airdrie Transit		
Comox Valley	British Columbia	72,445	Comox Valley Transit System		
Wood Buffalo	Alberta	72,326	Fort McMurray Transit		
Sault Ste. Marie	Ontario	72,051	Sault Transit Services		
Sarnia	Ontario	72,047	Sarnia Transit		
Granby	Quebec	69,025	Transport Urbain Granby		
St. Albert	Alberta	68,232	St. Albert Transit		
Norfolk County	Ontario	67,490	Ride Norfolk		
Grande Prairie	Alberta	64,141	Grande Prairie Transit		
Medicine Hat	Alberta	63,271	Medicine Hat Transit		
Fredericton	New Brunswick	63,116	Fredericton Transit		
Saint-Hyacinthe	Quebec	57,239	Compagnie de Transport Maskoutaine		
Welland	Ontario	55,750	Niagara Region Transit		
Belleville	Ontario	55,071	Belleville Transit		
North Bay	Ontario	52,662	North Bay Transit		
Brandon	Manitoba	51,313	Brandon Transit		
Châteauguay	Quebec	50,815	Exo Secteur Sud-Ouest		
Shawinigan	Quebec	49,620	Réseau de Transport en Commun de Shawinigan		
Joliette	Quebec	49,246	Corporation de Transport Joliette Métropolitain		
Rimouski	Quebec	48,935	Société des transports de Rimouski		
Cornwall	Ontario	47,845	Cornwall Transit		
Woodstock	Ontario	46,705	Woodstock Transit		
Quinte West (Trenton)	Ontario	46,560	Quinte Access		
West Vancouver	British Columbia	44,122	West Vancouver Blue Bus		
Pictou County	Nova Scotia	43,657	Pictou County Transit		
Bradford West Gwillimbury	Ontario	42,880	BWG Transit		
St. Thomas	Ontario	42,840	St. Thomas Transit		
Rouyn-Noranda	Quebec	42,313	L'autobus de ville		
Mission	British Columbia	41,519	Central Fraser Valley Transit System		West Coast Express
Timmins	Ontario	41,145	Timmins Transit		
Regional District of Kitimat-Stikine	British Columbia	37,790	Skeena Regional Transit System		
Prince Albert	Saskatchewan	37,756	Prince Albert Transit		
Regional District of Bulkley-Nechako	British Columbia	37,737	Bulkley-Nechako Regional Transit System		
Spruce Grove	Alberta	37,645	Spruce Grove Transit		
Penticton	British Columbia	36,885	South Okanagan-Similkameen Transit System		
Campbell River	British Columbia	35,519	Campbell River Transit System		
Leduc	Alberta	34,094	Leduc Transit		
Moose Jaw	Saskatchewan	33,665	Moose Jaw Transit		
Orillia	Ontario	33,411	Orillia Transit		
Stratford	Ontario	33,232	Stratford Transit		
Fort Erie	Ontario	32,901	Fort Erie Transit		
Sunshine Coast Regional District	British Columbia	32,170	Sunshine Coast Transit System		
Orangeville	Ontario	30,167	Orangeville Transit		
Sainte-Julie	Quebec	30,045	Exo Secteur Sainte-Julie		
Leamington	Ontario	29,680	Leamington Transit		
Whitehorse	Yukon	28,201	Whitehorse Transit		
Midland-Penetanguishene	Ontario	27,894	Midland Penetanguishene Transit		
Fort Saskatchewan	Alberta	27,088	Fort Sask Transit		
Clarence-Rockland	Ontario	26,505	Clarence-Rockland Transpo		
Wasaga Beach	Ontario	24,862	Wasaga Beach Transit		
Collingwood	Ontario	24,811	Colltrans		
Banff-Canmore	Alberta	24,295	Roam		
Beloeil	Quebec	24,104	Exo Secteur Vallée du Richelieu		
Squamish	British Columbia	23,819	Squamish Transit System		
Tecumseh	Ontario	23,300	Tecumseh Transit		
Lindsay	Ontario	22,367	Lindsay Transit		
Brockville	Ontario	22,116	Brockville Transit		
Owen Sound	Ontario	21,612	Owen Sound Transit		
Fort St. John	British Columbia	21,465	Fort St. John Transit System		
Huntsville	Ontario	21,147	Huntsville Transit		
Beaumont	Alberta	20,888	Beaumont Transit		
Cobourg	Ontario	20,519	Cobourg Transit		
Cranbrook	British Columbia	20,499	Cranbrook Transit System		
Yellowknife	Northwest Territories	20,340	Yellowknife Transit		
Salmon Arm	British Columbia	19,432	Shuswap Regional Transit System		
Corner Brook	Newfoundland and Labrador	19,333	Corner Brook Transit		
Niagara-on-the-Lake	Ontario	19,088	Niagara Region Transit		
Port Alberni	British Columbia	18,259	Port Alberni Regional Transit System		
Powell River Region	British Columbia	17,825	Powell River Regional Transit System		
Port Hope	Ontario	17,773	Port Hope Transit		
Miramichi	New Brunswick	17,692	Miramichi Transit		
Bracebridge	Ontario	17,305	Bracebridge Transit		
Swift Current	Saskatchewan	16,750	Swift Transit		
Yorkton	Saskatchewan	16,280	Yorkton Transit		
Cold Lake	Alberta	15,661	Cold Lake Transit		
Elk Valley Area (Fernie, Sparwood, Elkford)	British Columbia	15,092	Elk Valley Transit System		
Kenora	Ontario	14,967	Kenora Transit		
Whistler	British Columbia	13,982	Whistler Transit System		
North Battleford	Saskatchewan	13,836	North Battleford Public Transit		
Dawson Creek	British Columbia	12,323	Dawson Creek Transit System		
Prince Rupert	British Columbia	12,300	Prince Rupert Transit System		
Terrace	British Columbia	12,017	Terrace Regional Transit System		
Salt Spring Island	British Columbia	11,635	Salt Spring Island Transit System		
Elliot Lake	Ontario	11,372	Elliot Lake Transit		
Nelson	British Columbia	11,106	West Kootenay Transit System		
Mont-Tremblant	Quebec	10,992	Mont-Tremblant public transit		
Williams Lake	British Columbia	10,947	Williams Lake Transit System		
Regional District of Mount Waddington	British Columbia	10,839	Mount Waddington Transit System		
Whitecourt	Alberta	9,927	Whitecourt Transit		
Quesnel	British Columbia	9,889	Quesnel Transit System		
Hinton	Alberta	9,817	Hinton Transit		
Temiskaming Shores	Ontario	9,634	Tri-Town Transit		
Bridgewater	Nova Scotia	8,790	Bridgewater Transit		
Castlegar	British Columbia	8,338	West Kootenay Transit System		
Revelstoke	British Columbia	8,275	Revelstoke Transit System		
Kitimat	British Columbia	8,131	Kitimat Transit System		
Kimberley	British Columbia	8,115	Kimberley Transit System		
Trail	British Columbia	7,920	West Kootenay Transit System		
Merritt	British Columbia	7,051	Merritt Regional Transit System		
Yarmouth	Nova Scotia	6,829	Town of Yarmouth Transit		
Hope	British Columbia	6,686	Hope Regional Transit System		
Columbia Valley	British Columbia	6,526	Columbia Valley Transit System		
Creston Area	British Columbia	6,275	Creston Valley Transit System		
Smithers	British Columbia	5,378	Smithers Regional Transit System		
Hazelton Area	British Columbia	5,332	Hazeltons Transit System		
Gabriola Island	British Columbia	4,500	Gertie		
Pemberton	British Columbia	3,407	Pemberton Valley Transit System		
Tofino	British Columbia	2,516	Tofino Free Shuttle		
Clearwater	British Columbia	2,388	Clearwater Regional Transit System		
100 Mile House	British Columbia	1,928	100 Mile House Regional Transit System		
