= Sea to Sky =

Sea to Sky may refer to:

- Sea-to-Sky Highway, a highway in Western Canada, the portion of highway 99 from Horseshoe Bay to Pemberton
- Sea-to-Sky Corridor, the region around the Sea-to-Sky Highway which includes Whistler
- Sea to Sky University, a university in Squamish, British Columbia, Canada, opened in 2007
- Sea to Sky Transit, a division of Pacific Western Transportation, which operates service in Whistler and the Pemberton Valley area of British Columbia, Canada
- Sea to Sky School District, a school district covering Squamish, Whistler, and Pemberton in British Columbia, Canada
- Sea to Sky (sculpture), public art at the Washington State Capitol, Olympia, Washington
