= STTR =

STTR may refer to:

- Small Business Technology Transfer Program, a United States Government program, similar to the Small Business Innovation Research program
- Speech-to-text reporter
- Space Test and Training Range
- Société de transport de Trois-Rivières, a transit company in Trois-Rivières, Quebec, Canada
