= Troop carrier =

Troop carrier is an informal or unofficial term for:

- a troop carrier truck, a military truck designed to transport military soldiers and light weapons.
- an armoured personnel carrier or infantry fighting vehicle, whether tracked or wheeled
- a bus, especially an armored bus, used to carry military personnel
- any military transport aircraft, whether fixed-wing or helicopter
- any off-road vehicle with all-wheel drive and, usually, seating for six or more passengers, in addition to the driver
- in rail transport
  - a specific route, such as the Leamington Transit electric railway, in Canada, during World War I
  - a purpose-built rail car, such as a troop sleeper (US Army, World War II)
- a troopship or smaller vessel used to carry military personnel
  - Armored Troop Carrier, a riverine patrol vessel introduced by the US military in 1966
