= Sault Ste. Marie Transit Services =

Public transportation authority for Sault Ste. Marie, Ontario

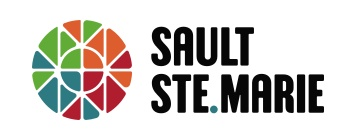

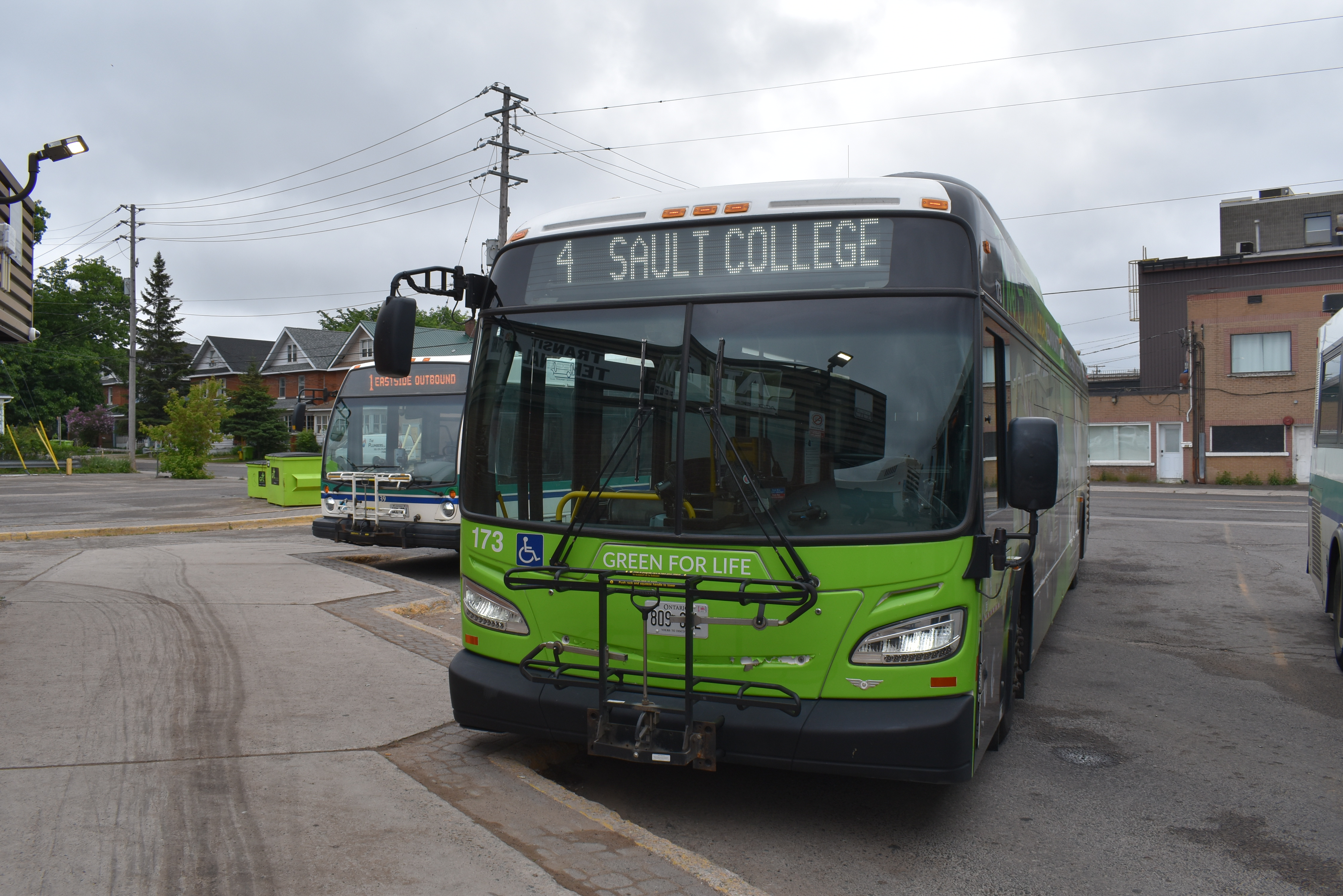
- Buses at the Dennis Street Terminal
- Founded: 1888 (as Sault Sainte Marie Electric Light and Transit Company); 1903 (as International Transit Company); 1942 (as Algoma Steel Corporation Transit); 1964 (as Sault Ste. Marie Transit Services)
- Headquarters: 111 Huron Street 46°31′04″N 84°20′57″W
- Locale: Sault Ste. Marie, Ontario
- Service type: Bus service, Paratransit
- Routes: 7 Major Bus Routes; 2 Community Bus Routes
- Stations: Downtown terminal 160 Queen Street East 46°30′56″N 84°20′16″W
- Fleet: 27 Accessible; 2 Minibus; 11 Para-bus
- Website: Transit Services

Sault Ste. Marie Transit Services is a local public transportation service serving the city of Sault Ste. Marie, Ontario providing seven major bus routes and two community bus routes serviced by a fleet of 27 buses and 2 minibuses. The Parabus service consists of 11 vehicles.

Old logo from 1990's to 2019

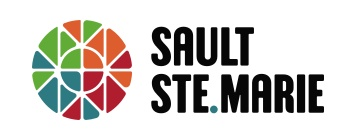
New logo since July 15, 2019

== History ==
=== Early years ===
Sault Ste. Marie transit services since 1888:

- 1888–1903: Sault Sainte Marie Electric Light and Transit Company
- 1903–1942: International Transit Company (the last day of streetcar service was 31 October 1942)
- 1942–1964: Algoma Steel Corporation Transit
- 1964 to present: Sault Ste. Marie Transit Services operated by the City of Sault Ste. Marie

=== Recent history ===
In 2020, the City of Sault Ste. Marie announced that it was planning to relocate the main municipal bus terminal from Dennis Street to Huron Street where the current bus maintenance facility is.

== Routes ==
=== Current ===
All routes start and end at the Downtown Transit Terminal located at Queen Street and Dennis Street.

Route Number	Route Name	Terminus
1	Eastside	Dacey Road and Trunk Road
2	Great Northern	Grand Gardens North (Great Northern Road and Fourth Line East) via Northern Transfer Hub and Sault Area Hospital
3	Korah Road	Fourth Line East and People's Road (Transfer to Northern On-Demand)
4	Sault College	Algoma University via Northern Transfer Hub
5	Riverside/McNabb	Sault Area Hospital via Northern Transfer Hub
6A	North Street	Northern Transfer Hub
6B	North Street (evenings and weekends only)	Pawating Place via Northern Transfer Hub
7	Steelton/Second Line	Sault Area Hospital via Northern Transfer Hub
Special	Pointe des Chênes (summer weekends and holidays)	Express to Pointe des Chênes Beach via Northern Transfer Hub
Community Buses		
Central	Central Community Bus (weekdays)	Finnish Resthome
Northern	On Demand Service	McQueen Neighbourhood

==== Frequencies ====
All regular routes operate every 30 minutes during weekdays until 7 pm. Regular routes operate every hour weekdays after 7 pm and on weekends.

The Central Community Bus operates every hour, Monday-Friday from 6:30 am to 5:30 pm.

The Pointe des Chênes bus operates as a pilot during the summer of 2021 on weekends and holidays from June 26, 2021, until September 5, 2021 (except Canada Day). It operates 3 trips, one in the morning, afternoon, and early evening.

===== On-Demand Sunday Evening Service =====
Starting on 8 September 2019, Sunday evening service (7 pm to 11:30 pm) was switched to be on-demand. This was due to the low demand during this time. Sunday evening service was previously cut, to the disappointment of riders. Riders book a ride through the Sault Ste. Marie On-Demand app developed by Via or by calling transit dispatch. Riders are between existing stops, not curbside.

== Terminals ==
=== Downtown Terminal (Queen and Dennis Terminal) ===
All routes start and end at the Downtown Terminal. This terminal offers an indoor waiting area, washrooms, shop, and driver facilities. The terminal has 6 bays. The terminal is in poor condition and is due to be replaced. There are also ongoing safety concerns, with the terminal staffed by a security guard. The terminal is also not accessible to passengers with disabilities.

=== Northern Transfer Hub ===
The Northern Transfer Hub opened on 3 May 2021. The Hub features a heated waiting shelter and 4 bus bays. The Hub is located on the Sault College campus providing service to the growing student population and area residents. The Hub is served by routes 2, 4, 5, 6A, 6B, 7, Point des Chenes, and the Central Community Bus.

== Incidents ==
Date	Number	Route	Description
17 January 2005	???	North Street	Afternoon City Police attended at the intersection of Wilcox Street and Maple Street for an accident involving a city bus and a car. Stafie Ochman of 52 Kent Avenue was travelling southbound on Maple Street and stopped for the stop sign but then proceeded through. A city bus operated by Henry Tulonen of 8 Gordon Avenue was proceeding eastbound on Wilcox Avenue when the Ochman car drove in front of the bus. Mrs. Ochman has been charged under the Highway Traffic Act of Ontario with one count of fail to yield to through traffic. Mrs. Ochman received non-life-threatening injuries but did not require medical treatment at the time of the incident. None of the persons on the bus were injured.
6 December 2012	128	Riverside	A bad situation happened in just about the best circumstances when a Sault Ste. Marie Transit driver passed out behind the wheel on Thursday. The female employee lost consciousness when she had a medical episode, police say. The eastbound Riverside bus she was driving, with eight passengers on board, left Queen Street East, jumped a curb, passed through driveways of two homes at civic addresses 2166 and 2172 and plowed over small trees before stopping in an empty field about 140 metres from the road. The 32-seat 1991 MVI Classic did not hit any oncoming, or parked, vehicles and missed a hydro pole and ditch about 10 feet away. “Nothing of any kind of consequence (was struck),” said Sgt. Ray Magnan, head of traffic services with Sault Ste. Marie Police Service. The driver, who was wearing a seatbelt, was taken to Sault Area Hospital. “She’s fine,” said Magnan. The passengers, none of whom were hurt, were brought home by a transit parabus. The collision outcome was “best as could be hoped,” said transit manager Don Scott at the scene on Friday morning. “Situations like this are definitely unforeseen,” he said. “We’re just lucky that nobody was hurt this time around.” All transit drivers are required to have a physical every three years.
13 June 2014	146	North Street	Call it bad luck on Friday the 13th for a North Street bus Friday afternoon. Saultonline.com viewer, James Scott sent in these photos of a city dump truck and city bus not getting along at Trelawne Avenue and Wilson Street early Friday afternoon. The City Transit Bus suffered moderate to heavy damage including a cracked windshield . It is not known if there were any passengers on the bus. No injuries were reported.
16 January 2015	129	Steelton	Officers from Investigation Services are continuing to work on the fatality from earlier today on Douglas Street. Investigators are looking to speak to anyone who was on the city bus that was traveling along the Steelton route today (January 16, 2015) between 8:45 am and 9:30 am while it was on Douglas Street.
4 January 2019	135	Great Northern	One person received minor injuries when a Sault Ste. Marie Transit Services bus collided with another vehicle on Lukenda Drive at Sault Area Hospital on Friday morning. The personal automobile was towed, said Const. Sonny Spina of Sault Ste. Marie Police Service. A Police investigation continues. The north-east crash was followed 20 minutes later by a two-vehicle collision at Wellington Street East and Upton Road. No one was hurt.
21 January 2019	131	McNabb	Shortly after 3 p.m. Sault Ste. Marie Police Service responded to a collision involving a Sault Transit bus and a pickup truck. Police say that both vehicles were heading east on Trunk Road when the pickup truck collided with the rear of the bus. No injuries were reported. Sault Ste. Marie Police Service is investigating.

== Gallery ==
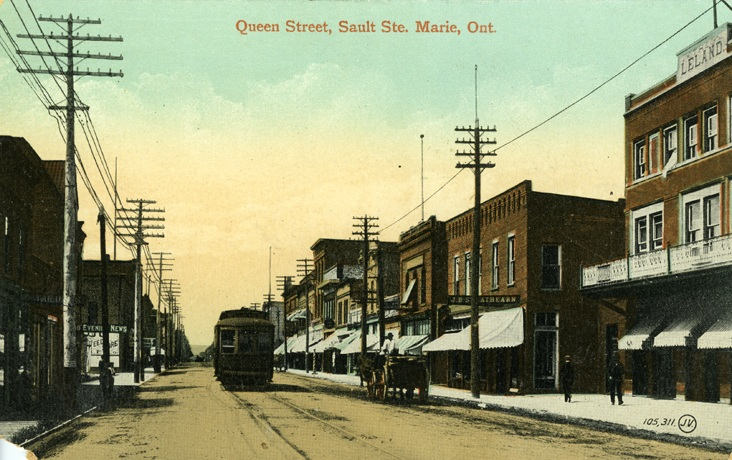
Streetcar on Queen Street in 1900s

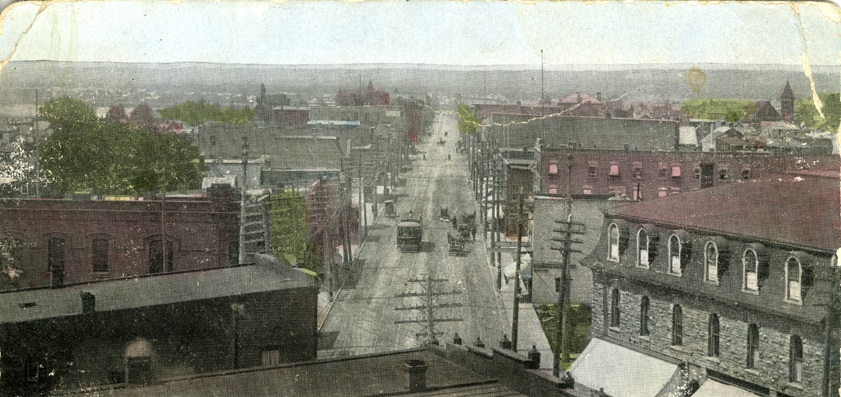
Streetcar on Queen Street in 1910s

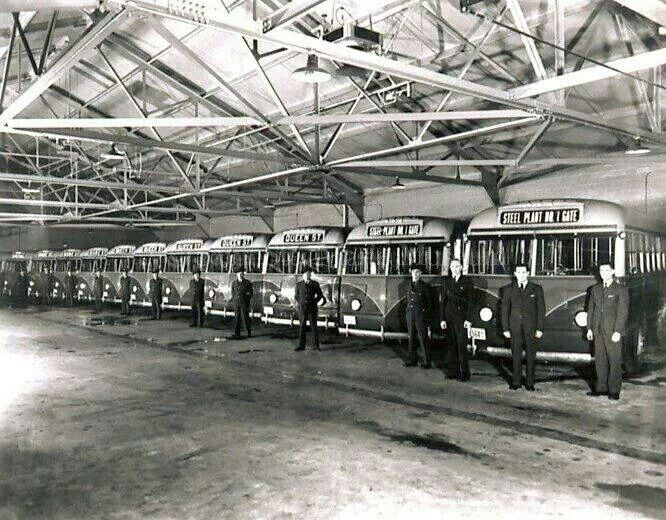
Buses garage in 1950s

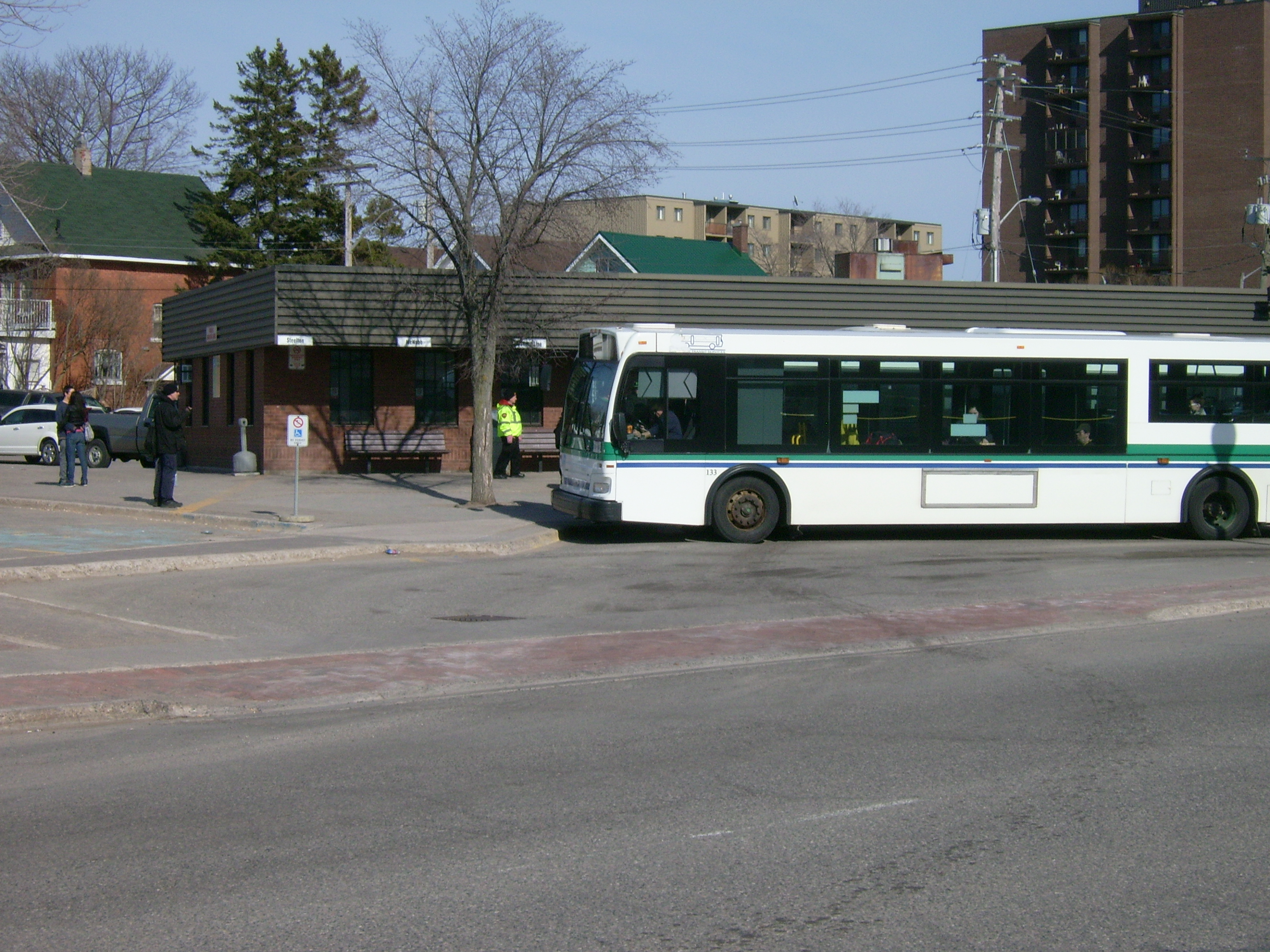
Bus (133) parking at Queen Terminal in 2010

== See also ==
- Public transport in Canada
