= Whitehorse Transit =

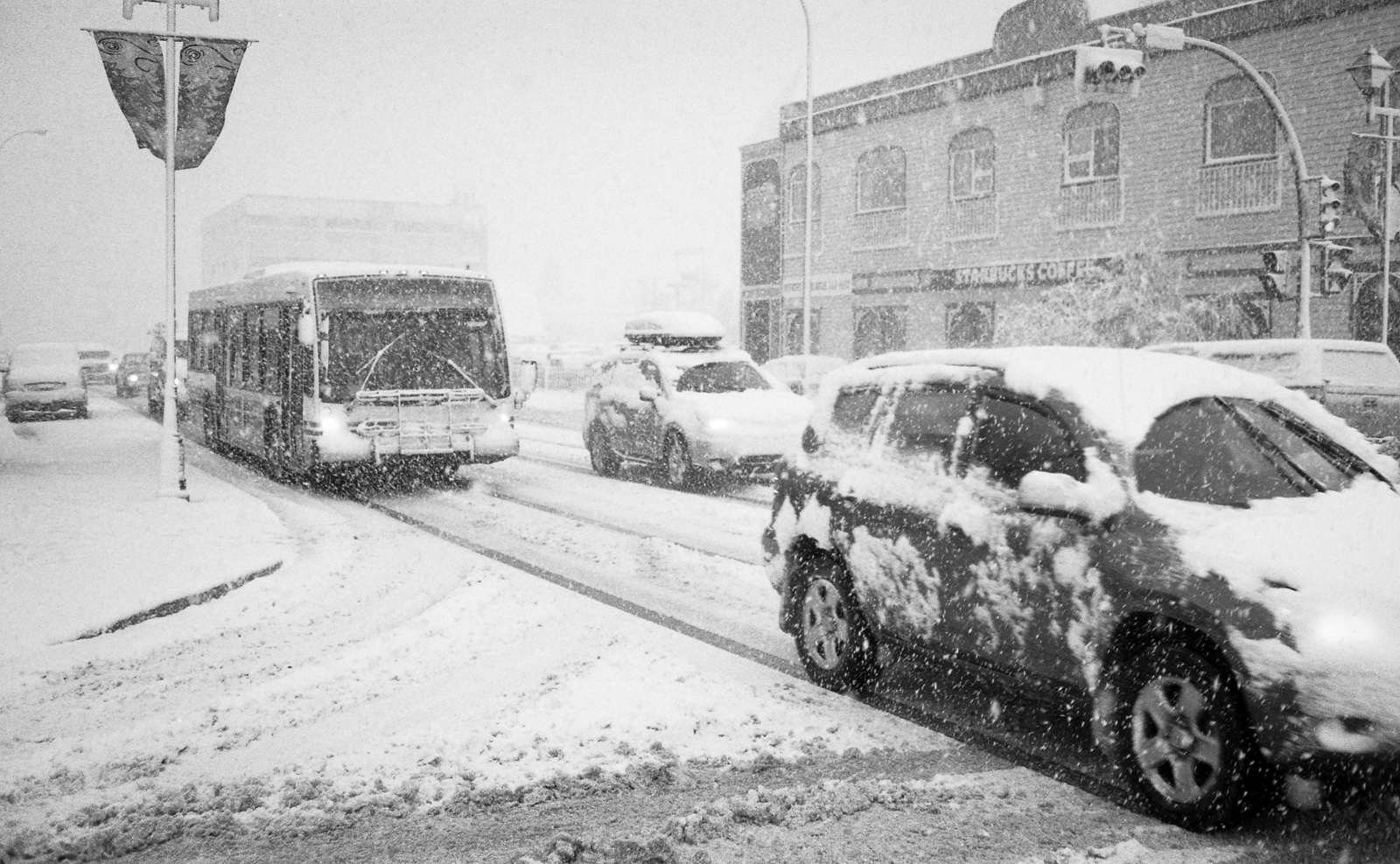
- A bus at Main Street and Second Avenue during a heavy snowfall in September 2014
- Founded: 1975
- Headquarters: 139 Tlingit Street
- Locale: Whitehorse, Yukon
- Service type: bus service, paratransit
- Routes: 7
- Fleet: 15; 13 40-foot NOVA LFS buses and 2 two cutaway units
- Website: www.whitehorse.ca/living-in-whitehorse/transit/

Whitehorse Transit is a city-owned transit company serving Whitehorse, Yukon. It operates on almost all days of the year, with Sunday/holiday service having been introduced in March 2022. The weekend service is a few hours shorter than the weekday service.

They also operate a door-to-door Handy Bus service for people with disabilities.

The transit system was founded in 1975 and went into service early in 1976 as the Women's Minibus Society but was taken over by the city by 1981. The system was originally established with five Fleury mini-buses, painted a lime green on white, the only colour that would show through snow, fog and rain.

By 1980, the system had retired some of the Fleury buses and replaced them with Superior school-bus type mini-buses, and in 1981, an Orion bus from Ontario Bus Industries was the first full-sized transit bus to operate in the city, arriving in time to be used for a world skiing championship. Two more Orions were purchased and the remaining Fleury buses were retired, with one now in the Yukon Transportation Museum. During a period of austerity, a GM Diesel bus was purchased from Hay River, and through the mid-1980s, more Orions were purchased from Calgary Transit, which was downsizing due to a recession. The remaining mini-buses were retired, and the fleet is now all full-sized buses, though some have called for the system to return to mini-buses.

During the mid-1980s, the colour scheme, which had changed from lime green to a more natural green, was changed to a red colour on the white.

The transit terminal was long located on Ogilvie Street between Third and Fourth Avenues, but from June 21, 1998, to January 3, 1999, the terminal was located on Range Road at the Takhini Arena; complaints by riders and Takhini subdivision residents led to city council ordering a return to Ogilvie Street.

A major update of the existing bus routes was originally planned for July 1, 2022, but this update was canceled on short notice, and the first stage of a revised update is now scheduled to come into effect on July 1, 2023, with the second stage planned for 2024.

== Routes ==
There are currently seven scheduled bus routes.

1	Riverdale North - Porter Creek Express	2	Riverdale South - Copper Ridge - Granger	3	Riverdale North - Raven's Ridge - McIntyre - Hillcrest (Including YXY Airport)	4	Porter Creek - Crestview	5	Takhini - Lobird - Copper Ridge Express	6	Ingram - Granger - Porter Creek - Whistle Bend	7	Whistle Bend - Riverdale North (Weekends only)

== Fleet ==
- Nova Bus LFS
- Handy Bus (Arboc Specialty Vehicles)

== See also ==
- Public transport in Canada
