= Tecumseh Transit =

Public transportation service in Tecumseh, Ontario, Canada

- Founded: 2009
- Locale: Tecumseh, Ontario
- Service type: Bus service
- Routes: 1
- Website: Tecumseh Transit Service

Tecumseh Transit provides a public transportation service for Tecumseh, Ontario, a suburb of the city of Windsor. Launched in 2009, the service is municipally owned but operated under contract by First Student Canada. After a successful 6 month pilot project, the service became permanent in August 2010.

The single transit line operates in a loop, making 37 stops at one-hour headways between 6AM and 6PM on Monday-Saturday. Connections can also be made with Transit Windsor at the Tecumseh Mall.

== History ==
In 1986, Tecumseh had transit service from January to June of that year. As a 6-month trial, it had failed due to low ridership. The bus used was ex-GO Transit #1505, an Ontario Bus Industries Orion I bus then owned and operated by Chatham Coach Lines as #193.

In March 2022, the town implemented an on-demand transit service to replace its fixed-route services. The new service uses software to create routes based on rider requests.

== See also ==
- Public transport in Canada
