= Kenora Transit =

Public transportation system in Kenora, Canada

- Founded: 1993
- Defunct: 2024
- Locale: Kenora, Ontario
- Service type: bus service, paratransit
- Routes: 3
- Fleet: 1
- Operator: First Student Canada
- Website: Transit Services

Kenora Transit was a small public transportation system in the city of Kenora in Northwestern Ontario, Canada, close to the Manitoba border and less than 200 kilometres (120 mi) east of Winnipeg. Service consisted of three bus routes which operated between 7:00am and 6:30pm on weekdays, due to driver shortage there was no service on Saturdays and there was no transit service on Sundays or public holidays. Handi Transit provided transportation for residents who were unable to access the regular transit bus. Effective October 15, 2024, service was replaced by microtransit.

== Routes ==
- Pine Crest
- Keewatin
- Lakeside / East Highway

== Fleet ==
Make	Model		Year	Fleet No.	Notes
ElDorado National	Aero Access	Disabled access	2005	501	
ElDorado National	EZ Rider II	Disabled access	2006	502	

== See also ==
- Public transport in Canada
