= Woodstock Transit =

Public transit service of Woodstock, Ontario, Canada

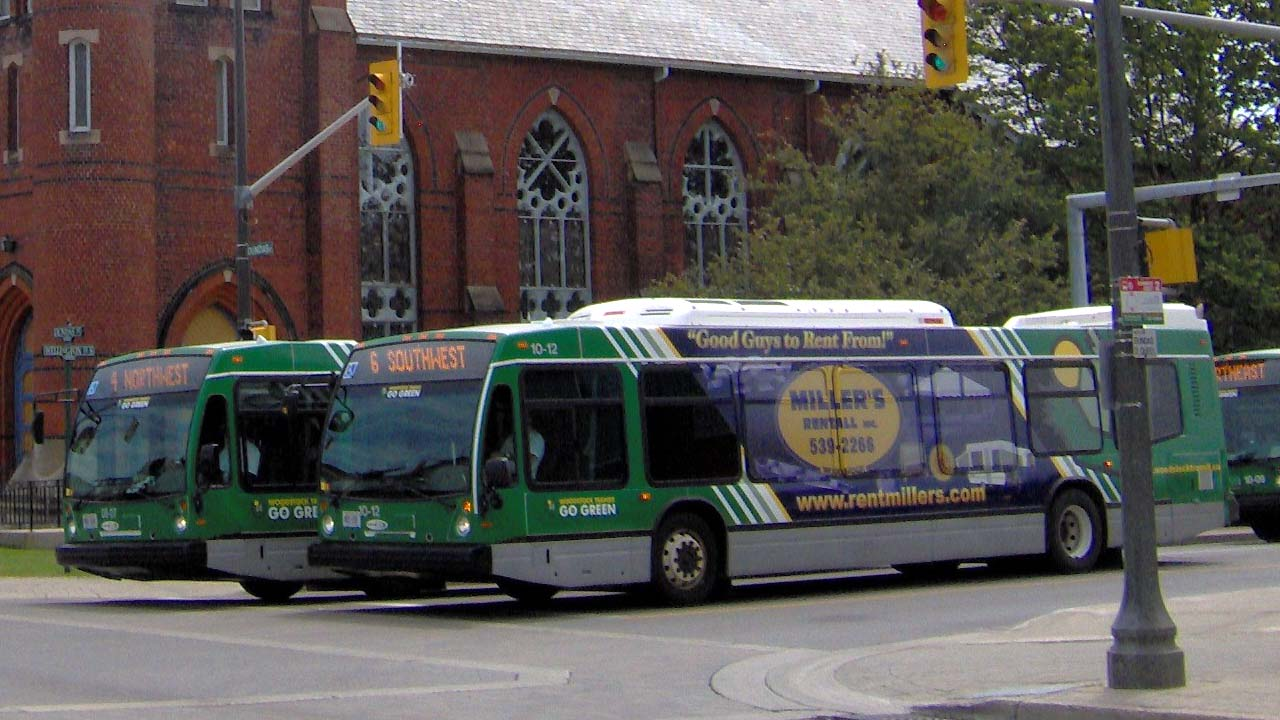
- Founded: 1962
- Locale: Woodstock, Ontario
- Service type: bus service, paratransit
- Routes: 7
- Hubs: Transit Terminal, 623 Dundas Street
- Fleet: 13
- Annual ridership: 453,100 (2019)
- Website: Transit Information

Woodstock Transit is operated by the City of Woodstock, Ontario, Canada, providing both regular transit bus routes and specialized paratransit services for the community.

Public transit service in Woodstock dates back to 1900 when the Woodstock, Thames Valley and Ingersoll Electric Railway Company began operation with electric interurban streetcars between Woodstock and Ingersoll, then replacement bus service from 1925 until 1942. Bluebird Coach Lines then ran the local transit service until the early 1950s when the City took over.

== Scheduled service ==
Regular transit buses currently operate on seven routes at half-hour intervals. Service operates between the hours of 6:00 a.m. and 10:00 p.m. Monday to Friday, and from 8:00 a.m. to 10:00 p.m. on Saturday. There is no Sunday or holiday service.

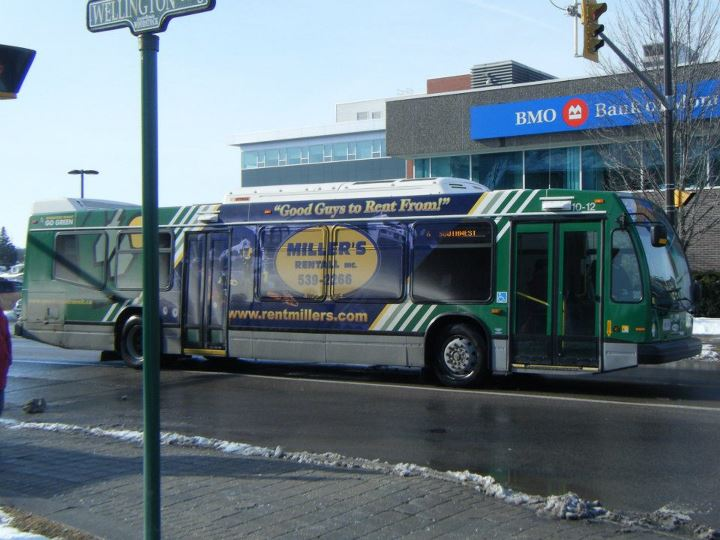
Woodstock Transit 10-12 is seen leaving downtown on route 6 Southwest

All buses operate on one-way loops from the transit terminal at 623 Dundas Street.

Woodstock Transit bus routes
No.	Name	Major streets served	Notes
1	Northeast	Kent, Hughson, Warwick, Springbank, Mohawk, Finch, Clarke	
2	Dundas East	Dundas, Bysham, Lansdowe, Cardinal, Nellis	
3	North Central	Huron, Highland, Leinster, Devonshire, Sprucedale, Sloane	
4	Northwest	Graham, Wellington, Devonshire, Vansittart, Ridgewood, Oxford, Hunter, Dundas	
5	Southeast	Henry, Cedar, Sunset, Longworth, Montclair, Juliana, Finkle, Spencer, Mill, Main	
6	Southwest	Simcoe, Mill, Park Rowe, Sixth, Sales, Athlone, Champlain, Juliana, Norwich, Fyfe, College, Victoria	
7	South Central	Dundas, Main, Park Row, Mill, Finkle, Juliana, Ferguson, East Park, Wellington	

== Para Transit ==
Para transit service is provided by the city on Monday to Saturday from 6 a.m. to 10:00 p.m. All users of the system must be registered.

== Proposed changes ==
A proposed change to the transit system is to use an off-street transit terminal at the corner of York and Dundas Streets.

== See also ==
- Public transport in Canada
