= YKTransit =

City run bus company in the Northwest Territories, Canada

Yellowknife Transit

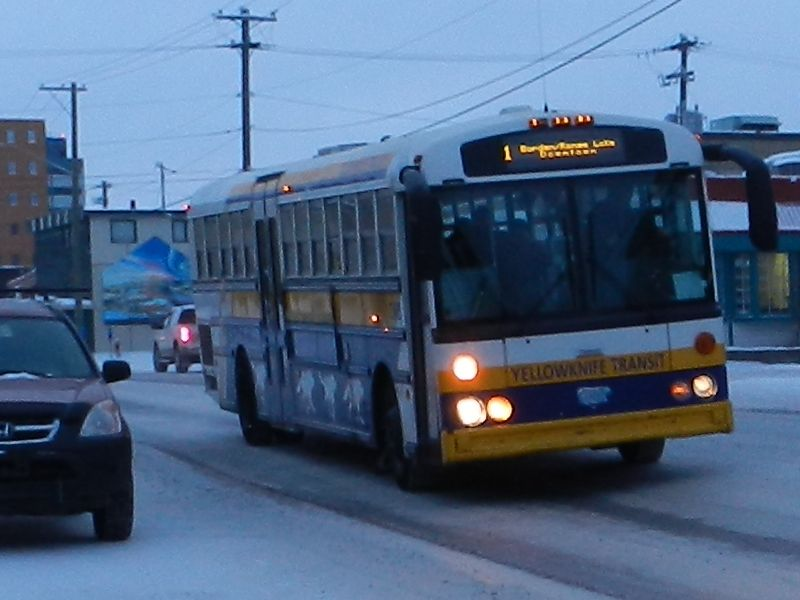
- Bus on 50th Avenue
- Parent: City of Yellowknife
- Founded: 1999
- Service area: urban area
- Service type: bus service, paratransit
- Routes: 5
- Fleet: 8 regular buses 2 paratransit
- Fuel type: diesel
- Operator: Transdev
- Website: YKTransit

YKTransit, formerly Yellowknife Transit, is the public transportation agency in the city of Yellowknife, Northwest Territories, Canada. The municipally funded and controlled system is the territory's only public transport system and is operated privately by Transdev. It also operates the paratransit service, Yellowknife Accessible Transit System (YATS). YKTransit operates three regular routes and one express service within the core of Yellowknife. In September 2024, the City of Yellowknife announced a rebrand of its public transit service to YKTransit with the arrival of four new accessible buses, bringing the fleet to eight regular buses and two paratransit buses.

== History ==
YKTransit is the fourth operator of public transit in Yellowknife. Three other privately run services had provided bus service prior to 1999, when Cardinal Coach Lines was awarded the franchise:

- Red Dusseault, 1945–1948.
- Frame and Perkins Limited, 1948–1990.
- Arctic Frontier Carriers Limited, 1990–1999.

As of 2008 the city was actively exploring means of improving transit service, noting that the city had a substantial number of residents who preferred to walk and ride. In August 2012 the city approved a new contract with Cardinal's successor, First Canada, at a cost of $1.25 million per year. First Canada was purchased by Transdev in March 2023, who assumed the former operator's contracts.

== Routes ==
There are three regular daily bus routes which run from 6:30 am to 7:30 pm on weekdays and Saturdays. Beginning in October 2024, a twice a day express service to Kam Lakes was introduced. There is no service on Sunday or statutory holidays. Sir John Franklin High School serves as the system's transfer station.

Prior to April 2012, two additional limited stop express services operated along Route 1 between the northern suburbs and the downtown core during morning and afternoon peak times.

Designation	Name	Notes
1	YK Connector	Half-hourly weekday service from the suburbanized northwest side to the suburbanized southwest, via Downtown.
2	Borden / Forest	Half-hourly weekday service from the suburbanized southwest side of the city to Downtown.
3	Niven Loop	Hourly weekday service through the older east side of the city and the native community of N'dilo to Downtown.
1 Express	Kam Lake Service (via Route 1)	Twice a day express service from the southwest community near Kam Lake to Downtown.

== See also ==
- Public transport in Canada
