= Midland Penetanguishene Transit =

Midland Transit
- Headquarters: 575 Dominion Avenue
- Locale: Midland, Ontario
- Service area: Urban area
- Service type: Bus service
- Routes: 3
- Website: Mid-Pen Transit

Midland Penetanguishene Transit, formerly Midland Transit Service, is a small municipal transit system in the Towns of Midland and Penetanguishene in Simcoe County, Ontario, Canada. Two routes operate from the hub at King and Elizabeth Streets every half-hour on weekdays and every hour on Saturday, with no service on Sundays and holidays. Midland also offers a wheelchair accessible van service, operated by Community Link North Simcoe, that offers door to door service. The bus depot and public works maintenance facility is located at 731 Ontario Street, but the system is administered from the town offices at 575 Dominion Avenue.

On February 1, 2016, a new route was launched into Penetanguishene. The route connects Penetanguishene to Midland at transfer stops at the old Mountainview mall and at Georgian Bay General Hospital.

== See also ==
- Public transport in Canada
