= Huntsville Transit =

- Headquarters: 20 Park Drive
- Locale: Huntsville, Ontario
- Service area: urban area
- Service type: bus service, paratransit
- Routes: 1
- Operator: Campbell Bus Lines
- Website: Huntsville Public Transit

Huntsville Transit provides local bus service in the town of Huntsville in the Muskoka Region of Ontario, Canada. They run two scheduled routes, but operations are flexible enough to accommodate the pick-up and drop-off of wheelchair clients and buses can be flagged down by other riders anywhere along the route.

== See also ==
- Public transport in Canada
