= Brockville Transit =

Public transport system in Ontario, Canada

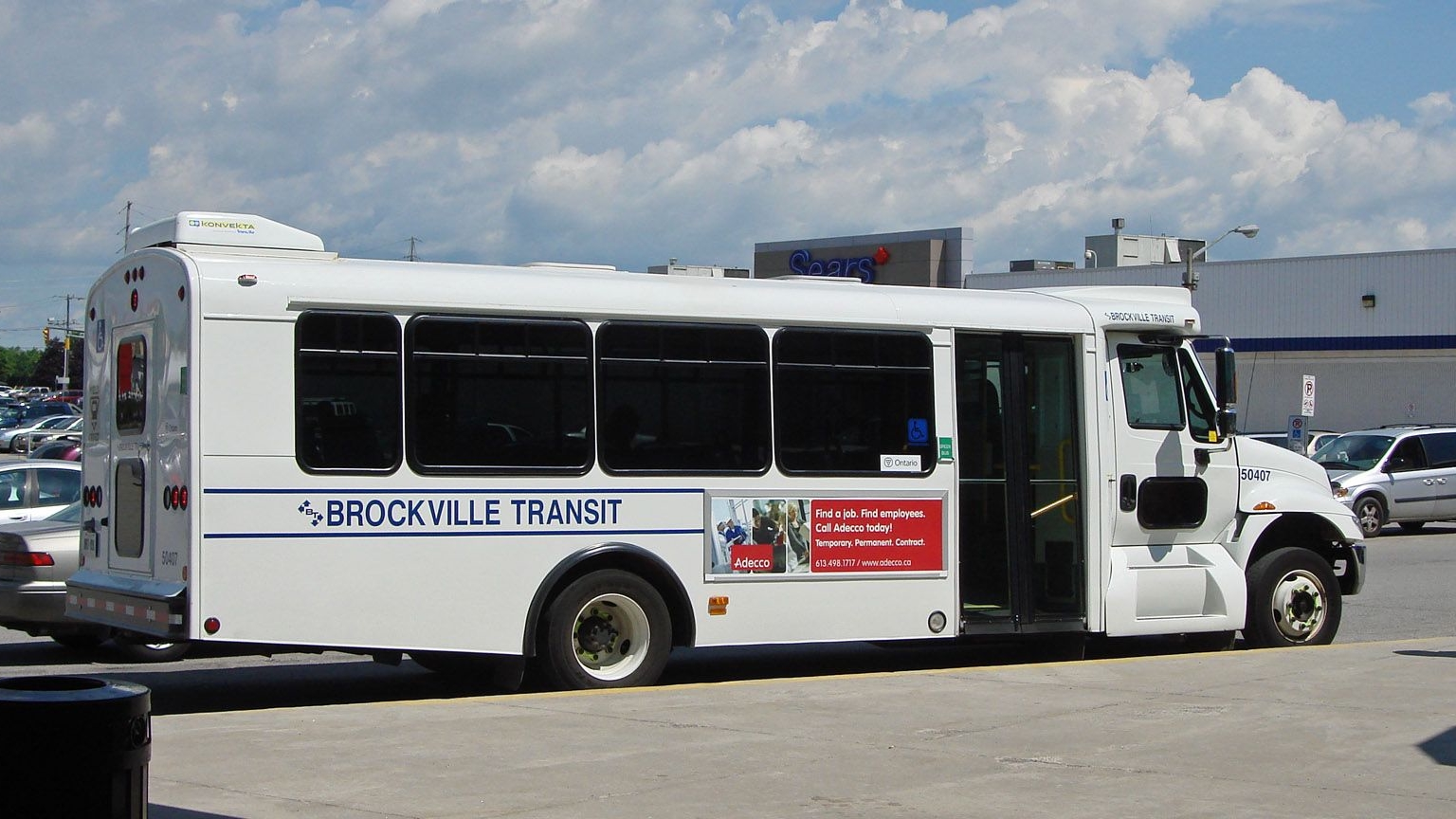
- Headquarters: 1 King Street West
- Locale: Brockville, Ontario
- Service area: urban area
- Service type: bus service, paratransit
- Routes: 3
- Operator: Brockville Operations Dept.
- Website: Brockville Transit

Brockville Transit is a small public transit system which covers the urban area of Brockville, Ontario, Canada.

Transit services currently operate between Monday and Saturday, with no Sunday or holiday service. All three conventional bus routes travel between the Court House in downtown and the box stores on Parkedale Avenue East. Each route encompasses a different area of the city and takes a slightly different path in the opposite direction to provide greater coverage to the community. Buses are scheduled to take half an hour between termini and an hour to complete their loop.

== Scheduled service ==
=== Routes ===
- GREEN BUS - Court House, Brockville General Hospital, St. Mary High School, Brockville Shopping Centre, 1000 Islands Mall, Box Stores, St. Lawrence College, Memorial Centre, Brockville Shopping Centre, Brockville General Hospital, Court House.
- BLUE BUS - Court House, Brockville Shopping Centre, Kensington Plaza, Ecole Ange-Gabriel, Box Stores, and a slightly different route between the same places on the return to the Court House.
- RED BUS - Court House, St. Lawrence Lodge, Brockville General Hospital, via Reynolds Dr, Box Stores, BCI & Brockville General Hospital, Museum, Brockville Arts Centre, to King St West at Centre St and return via Cedar St and Brock St, Post Office, Court House

== Paratransit ==
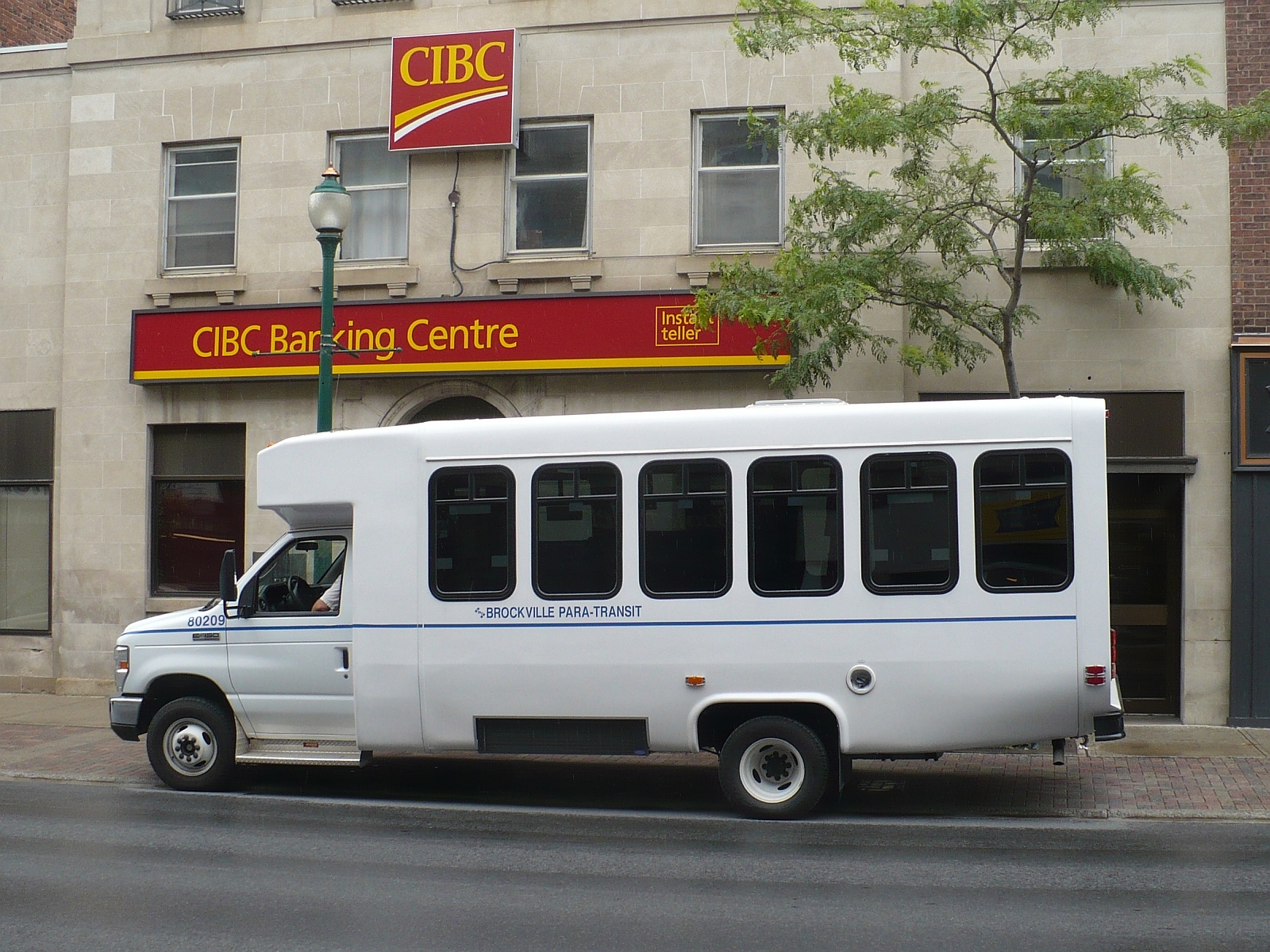

Para transit services are intended for persons with a disability that prevents them from climbing or descending the steps used in conventional transit buses or are unable to walk a distance of more than 175 metres. All eligible users must be registered and approved to use the service.

== See also ==
- Public transport in Canada
