= RMWB Transit =

Public transport in Fort McMurray and the region of Wood Buffalo, Alberta, Canada

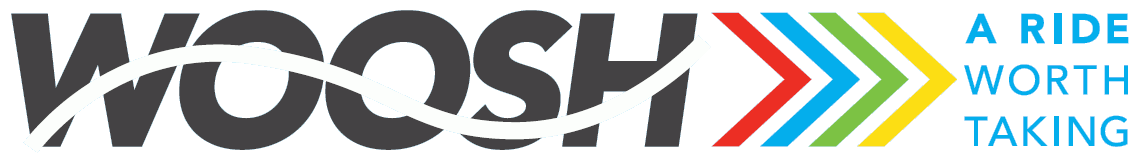
- Founded: 1980
- Headquarters: 9909 Franklin Avenue
- Locale: Fort McMurray
- Service area: urban area
- Service type: bus service, paratransit
- Routes: 9
- Operator: Wood Buffalo
- Website: Wood Buffalo Public Transit

RMWB Transit is a public transportation system provided by the Regional Municipality of Wood Buffalo, in northeastern Alberta, Canada. Services consist of local scheduled bus routes, specialized transportation for people with disabilities and school buses. Service is focused on the urban area of Fort McMurray, the only major population centre in the region, with some service to outlying communities.

== Routes ==
As of August 22, 2025, 9 regular bus routes operate every day. Routes 1 and 2 are designated as core routes, and offer frequent service, including evenings and weekends. Non-core routes may switch to on-demand service on evenings and weekends. Only routes 1, 2, and 6 run on holidays.

Scheduled Bus Routes
No.	Name	Information
1	Thickwood - Gregoire	Thickwood Terminal to Downtown, Keyano College, and Gregoire. Core route.
2	Timberlea - Keyano	Timberlea Terminal to Eagle Ridge, Downtown, and Keyano College. Core route.
3	MacDonald Island - Abasand	Abasand and Grayling Terrace to Downtown and MacDonald Island Park.
4	Beacon Hill - MacDonald Island	Beacon Hill to Downtown and MacDonald Island Park.
5	Timberlea - Bear Ridge	Timberlea Terminal in a loop covering western Timberlea.
6	Thickwood - Timberlea	Timberlea Terminal to Thickwood Terminal via Dickinsfield.
7	Wood Buffalo Estates	Thickwood Terminal to Wood Buffalo.
8	Eagle Ridge - Stone Creek	Timberlea Terminal to Stone Creek and Eagle Ridge.
9	Parsons Creek	Timberlea Terminal to northenn Timberlea and Parsons Creek.

== Operator ==
- Diversified Transportation before 2013
- Tok Transit 2013–2015
- Regional Municipality of Wood Buffalo 2015-present.

== See also ==
- Public transport in Canada
