= Orangeville Transit =

Local bus service in Ontario, Canada

- Founded: 1991
- Headquarters: 87 Broadway
- Locale: Orangeville, Ontario
- Service type: Public transit
- Fuel type: Diesel
- Operator: First Student Canada
- Website: Orangeville Departments: Transit

The Orangeville Transit System provides local bus service to the Town of Orangeville in central Ontario, Canada. Approval was given by the town council, on April 28, 2008, that the current contract with First Student Canada (formerly Laidlaw) to operate and maintain the transit buses, should be extended for another year. The Public Works Department administers the contract and is responsible for other non-operational functions. Town of Orangeville transit buses are all fully accessible, although less accessible First Student buses sometimes substitute.

== Free public transport program ==
On January 1, 2023 Orangeville commenced a pilot program of free public transport by which no fares were collected. Initially a two-year pilot program, the town announced in 2024 that the program would last until at least 2027. Orangeville became the largest town or city in Canada with a free public transport program. Prior to 2023, cash fare was $2.00 for adults or $1.50 for seniors & students, with monthly passes costing $35.00 or $25.00 respectively. Children under 5 rode for free.

== Services ==
Buses operate hourly on Monday to Friday from 6:30 am to 8:40 pm, and on Saturday from 7:15 am to 7:10 pm. Routes converge at the transfer point on Fourth Street and all operate along Broadway through the downtown, past the town hall municipal offices and the Mill Street library branch.

Route	Description	Notes
BLUE ROUTE	South end of city via Broadway, C Line, Alder Street, Abbey Road, Spencer Avenue, County Road 23, Riddell Road, Montgomery Boulevard, Centennial Road, Town Line, Bythia Street	
ORANGE ROUTE	Central portion of city via Broadway, Clara Street, Elizabeth Street, First Street, Buena Vista Drive, Headwaters Health Care Centre, Highway 10, Hansen Boulevard, College Avenue, Centre Street	

== GO Transit ==
GO Transit reached an agreement with Orangeville and the Orangeville Railway Development Corporation to construct a park & ride lot at the railway station with operation starting circa June 2008. During the week there were then six GO Bus trips in each direction. Orangeville Transit offered free connecting rides for GO Transit passengers holding a valid ticket or pass.

GO Park and Ride Coordinates: 43°54′49″N 80°05′27″W

== See also ==
- Public transport in Canada
