= Miramichi Transit =

- Founded: 2009
- Service area: Miramichi, New Brunswick
- Service type: bus service
- Operator: Miramichi Public Transit Commission Inc.
- Website: Official website

Miramichi Transit is a provider of public transportation based in Miramichi, New Brunswick, Canada. Founded in 2009, it provides 3 routes in the city. Buses run from approximately 7:00 am to 6:00 pm on weekdays and 9:00 am to 4:00 pm on Saturdays. Transit services are provided using small, 24 seat buses. The agency also offers charter services.

== Routes ==
- Blue Line: Newcastle to Douglastown, includes stops at Newcastle Public Library and Northumberland Square
- Green Line: Chatham to Douglastown, includes a stop at Northumberland Square
- Red Line: Chatham to Newcastle, via Chatham Head, includes a stop at Miramichi Hospital and Newcastle Public Library In the summer of 2021, Miramichi Transit innovated with a Saturday Nightline, offering a single route throughout the city on Saturday evenings in July and August.

== See also ==
- Public transport in Canada
