= Elliot Lake Transit =

Public transportation system of Elliot Lake in Northern Ontario, Canada

- Founded: 1983
- Locale: Elliot Lake
- Service area: urban area
- Service type: bus service, paratransit
- Routes: 4
- Operator: AJ Bus Lines
- Website: City of Elliot Lake Transit

Elliot Lake Transit is a public transportation system, which provides daily service with the exception of statutory holidays, within the small isolated city of Elliot Lake in Northern Ontario, Canada

Regular scheduled service operates on four routes using two low-floor handicapped accessible buses, providing once per hour trips on each route with a transfer point between routes at the Pearson Plaza. Hours of operation are from 7:00 am to 6:00 pm with extended service on Thursday and Friday evenings till 9:00 pm, and limited service on Sunday and no holiday service. Cash fare is $2.50 for adults and $2.00 for seniors and students, with 12 tickets costing $24.00 for everyone. Monthly passes are $60.00 for adults and $50.00 for seniors and students

For residents who are unable to board the regular transit buses, the city provides door to door service with the Handilift bus.

== Routes ==
Elliot Lake Transit has four routes:

- Westhill
- Central
- Esten
- Lakeside

The main hubs is Rexall at 151 Ontario Avenue; some transit materials erroneously refer to it as Eastwood Mall, after the mall's ownership company.

As of 2022, service operates seven days each week, with extended services on Thursday and Friday and limited services on Sunday. There is no service on statutory holidays.

== See also ==
- Public transport in Canada
