= North Bay Transit =

Bus operator in North Bay, Ontario, Canada

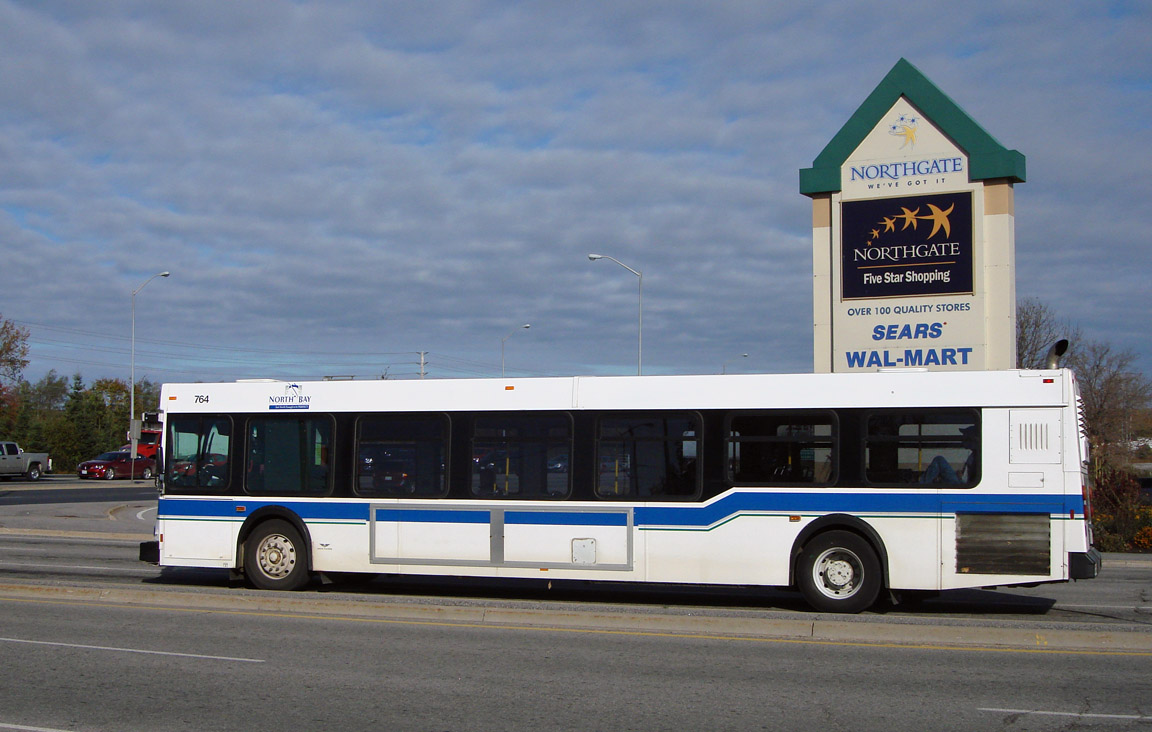
- Parent: Engineering Division (before 2005); Community Services Department (since 2005), City of North Bay
- Founded: 1972
- Headquarters: 190 Wyld Street (Peter Reid Bus and Para-bus Terminal)
- Locale: North Bay, Ontario
- Service area: urban area
- Service type: Bus service, Paratransit
- Routes: 8
- Stations: 1
- Fuel type: diesel
- Operator: City of North Bay
- Chief executive: Remi Renaud, Manager
- Website: North Bay Transit

North Bay Transit provides bus services within the city limits of North Bay, Ontario, Canada. Para-Bus vehicles are also available to serve physically challenged individuals. It operates as a city department, out of the transit terminal on Oak Street at Wyld Street.

== History ==
North Bay transit services since the Second World War

- 1946 - 1960 Palangios' DeLuxe Coach Lines
- 1960 - 1968 McCarthy Bus Service
- 1968 - 1972 Charterways Transportation Limited
- 1972 - to present operated by the city

== Fares ==
Cash fare (including paratransit) is $3.00 for all riders with a 10 ride multiple fare punch card costing $27.00. Monthly transit passes are priced at $86.00 for adults, $65.00 for students and $55.00 for children, with a term pass available during the school year.

== Scheduled services ==
- 1A College-University
- 1B Campus Special
- 1C McKeown Corridor
- 2 Marshall Park
- 3 Ski Club-Pinewood
- 4 Junction
- 5 Graniteville
- 6 Hornell-CFB
- 7 Birchaven-Trout Lake
- 8 Eastview-Algonquin

== Para-Bus ==
People who are physically unable to board a conventional transit bus or cannot walk a distance of more than 175 metres are eligible to use the Para-Bus service, which is operated by the Physically Handicapped Adults' Rehabilitation Association (PHARA) on behalf of the city. Those who are eligible must be registered to make use of this service.

Although North Bay Transit's newer buses are accessible, PHARA operates a fleet of minibuses to provide more seating for those with physical disabilities.

== See also ==
- Public transport in Canada
