= Medicine Hat Transit =

Municipal public transit service in Alberta, Canada

- Founded: 1956 (as Medicine Hat Transportation Company)
- Headquarters: 460 Spencer Street SE
- Locale: Medicine Hat
- Service area: urban area
- Service type: bus service, paratransit
- Routes: 11 (Peak); 8 (Non-peak)
- Stops: 279 (Peak); 212 (Non-peak)
- Hubs: 6
- Fleet: 14 Minibuses, 16 40-Foot buses
- Fuel type: Diesel and CNG
- Operator: City of Medicine Hat
- Website: Medicine Hat Transit

Medicine Hat Transit is the municipal public transportation system operated by Medicine Hat, a small city in southeastern Alberta, Canada. Service is available and accessible to all residents of the community, including specialized transit for persons with disabilities; all of the MHT fleet is fully wheelchair-accessible.

== History ==
In the 1950s local bus service was provided by Blair's Bus Lines, which was superseded by Medicine Hat Transportation Company, until 1972, when city-owned Medicine Hat Transit commenced operation of the current system. Starting in October 2008 Medicine Hat Transit began a transformation, with new routes and schedules and a fleet makeover and rebranding.

== Services ==
Peak-service bus routes are scheduled to operate on weekdays between 6:45 am and 6:45 pm. Non-peak routes extend operations until 10:45 pm on weekdays and all day Saturday, with Sunday service 8:15 am– 7:15pm & holiday service provided between 10:15 am and 6:15 pm.

Specialized paratransit is available for people who can't use regular transit, a service for which they must be registered. Hours of operation are Monday to Saturday between 6:45 a.m. and 7:00 p.m. and all trips must be booked the day before.

== Routes ==
This following service is in effect from Monday – Friday, 6:45 am – 6:45 pm except Holidays, on what Medicine Hat Transit defines as peak service.

- 10 Northeast Crescent Heights
- 11 Northwest Crescent Heights
- 20 Flats
- 21 Hospital
- 22 South Hill
- 31 Dunmore Road
- 40/41 College
- 50/51 Ross Glen
- 60 South Ridge
- 62 Southlands

Service becomes more limited during the non-peak, which is defined as the following times: Monday – Friday 6:45 pm – 10:45 pm Saturday 6:45 am – 10:45 pm Sundays -8:15 am – 7:15pm Holidays 10:15 am – 6:15 pm

- 10 Northeast Crescent Heights
- 11 Northwest Crescent Heights
- 20 Flats
- 21 Hospital
- 22 South Hill
- 30 Dunmore Road
- 53 Ross Glen
- 61 South Ridge

== See also ==
- Public transport in Canada
