= Lindsay Transit =

Bus service in Lindsay, Ontario, Canada

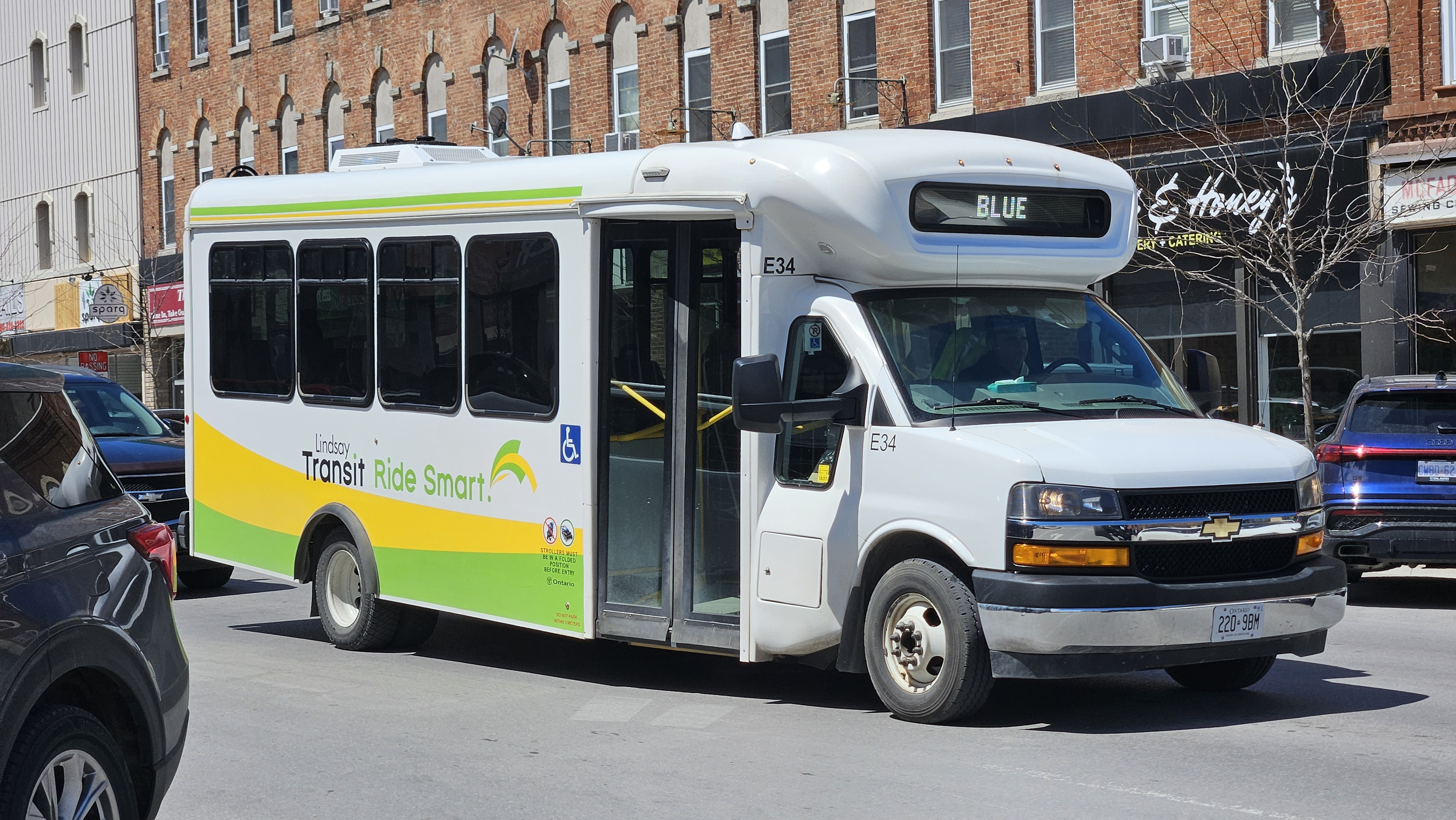
- Founded: 1978
- Headquarters: 26 Francis St., Lindsay
- Locale: Kawartha Lakes, Ontario
- Service area: Lindsay, Ontario
- Service type: bus service
- Routes: 4
- Stops: 201, counting all routes
- Operator: City of Kawartha Lakes
- Website: Lindsay Transit

Lindsay Transit provides bus service to the community of Lindsay, the main population centre in the City of Kawartha Lakes in east-central Ontario, Canada. The bus service only provides the town, and cannot be accessed by GO Transit's bus yet.

There are currently four routes, being Red, Orange, Green, and Blue. There is also an extra bus route operating in Lindsay going through unfixed routes, separate from Lindsay Transit being Community Care, City of Kawartha Lakes. Buses operate Monday to Saturday between 7:00 am and 10:00 pm, Sundays from 9:00am to 4:00pm, with no service on New Year's Day, Family Day, Good Friday, Victoria Day, Canada Day, August Civic Holiday, Labour Day, Thanksgiving Day and Christmas Day. Like many small systems, the buses run on one way loops to maximize coverage of the service area using the minimum of resources and meet at a downtown terminus. The buses are garaged at the City Works Depot at 89 St. David Street.

== History ==
In c.1950, Lindsay Lines Limited was the first bus service in Ops, which was in Victoria County and ran until February 1953, when Lindsay Bus Lines took over Lindsay Lines Limited for unknown reasons. After a few decades, Lindsay Bus Lines stopped running services and Denure Bus Co. helped substitute for transit operations in Lindsay which started to run in use in 1959 and continued operations until 1970 in January, when the government introduced its own bus service named “Algar Coach Lines Ltd.” From January 2nd, 1970 - it only had three routes, named “East”, “West & South”, and “North”. Lindsay Transit then took over in 1978, following its way to the town of Lindsay.

It is unknown how many lines were in service until 2004, when there were two routes, Red and Green. The Red route shows many similarities to what the Orange route and Green route serves in the present, and the Green route shows many similarities to what the Blue route serves in the present.In 2008, The Blue Route running from Victoria Avenue at Kent Street to Cambridgeshire Street South at Russell Street was in service, and the green route started to take over what the Red route did in the north of Lindsay. They also have removed many stops from all three routes at the time.From July 4th, 2011 to November 1st, 2012, bus services started running a one-year pilot project to run long-term or rural services from places in Kawartha Lakes. It was used for three days a week, with one route for each day. Those being:

Monday - First alternating week in order (that being started in January 30th) being Route 1A, serving Kinmount, Burnt River, Fenelon Falls, Southview Estates, Cameron, and Pleasant View, and Second alternating week in order (that being started in January 23rd) being Route 1B, serving Norland, Coboconk, Fenelon Falls, and Joyvista Estates

Tuesday - Route 2, serving Victoria Place, Bobcaygeon, and Dunsford

Thursday - Route 3, serving Bethany, Omemee, Riverwood Estates, Lindsay, Chandler’s Corners, Oakwood, and Little Britain.

It was cancelled, but has been brought back on June 24th, 2013. It ran until June 27th, 2015 and hasn’t revived since, but a third revival is in the process of being thought of from many different aspects ranging from as early as 2027 and as late as 2036. On September 8th, 2014, newer services ran on the Blue line going from the intersection of Colborne Street West to Kent Street West, also with them changing their map to a more accurate map scale of Lindsay.On July 7th, 2019, following a concern for people only using public transit, Lindsay Transit started operations 7 days a week. Also on that same day, the transit hub has moved one block.On February 23rd, 2023, the Orange Route running from Victoria Avenue at Kent Street to Kent Street at Albert Street started running services and posters on bus stops helped promote the new service by using pun-like jokes about oranges. It has been planned since 2019.

== Future needs ==
In August 2026, there was a second draft plan being planned for four needs being added by 2027 to 2036. What was planned were four needs, that being the following:

Two new routes and increasing frequency for Lindsay Transit by 2027, adding routes to Bobcaygeon and Fenelon Falls by 2028, adding connections to nearby municipalities, and adding microtransit in rural areas also by 2028.

Then by October 2026, the second draft plan since 2016 was released to the public and made six needs that were to be done, being made three categories for the ten year plan. 2027 to 2029 being the short term, 2030 to 2032 being the medium term, and 2033 to 2036 being the long term.

The first need is to improve the frequency of Lindsay Transit buses, as the bus stops only go once every hour, being projected by 2034 to 2036 .

The second and third need is to build public transit routes in Bobcaygeon and Fenelon Falls, but not having a projected year to have it done by.

The fourth need from the draft plan shows four specific routes that people will be able to ride, that being citizens of Lindsay can go to and from Bobcaygeon, Fenelon Falls and Omemee while Bobcaygeon citizens also get a route to and from Fenelon Falls, making four “city routes”. The names given in the draft plan were called "C1", "C2", "C3", and "C4". It is projected to be done by 2028 to 2029, except for the Fenelon-Bobcaygeon route which is expected by 2031.

The fifth need is to establish a new transit connection to the Peterborough area, with the route being called in the draft plan "R1". It was made by 2029.

The sixth and last need is to establish a new transit connection to the Oshawa GO Station. In the draft plan, it is titled "R2A". "R2B" goes through Port Perry. Like many other rural places, the GO bus will be constructed as a park-and-ride and it will be at Angeline Street and Auk Trail. If GO does not make the construction, something similar will be made connecting Lindsay to Oshawa.

They have addressed the two new lines in the draft plan, and have made a recommended map with the two new lines, being named “William North” and “Highway 36”.

They also addressed the microtransit services and have modelled three service alternatives, those being the following:

An on-demand service of the Central Kawartha Lakes Zone, also named "M1" suggesting 5 to 8 hubs to places such as Lindsay, Fenelon Falls, Bobcaygeon, Sturgeon Point, Pleasant Point, etc.

A pre-booked service of the Central Kawartha Lakes zone, also named "M2" suggesting 8 to 10 hubs to places such as Lindsay, Fenelon Falls, Bobcaygeon, Woodville, Omemee, Pontypool, Sturgeon Point, Kirkfield, etc. Since many of these places have a low population density, booking will be required.

The plans being made will cost by the long term to be estimated to be around 10.9 million dollars.

By 2041, GO Transit is setting goals to bring service from Lindsay to Peterborough, Oshawa, and the planned Bowmanville GO Station.

== Routes ==
The routes run on a loop that runs every hour, starting from Victoria Avenue at Kent Street; the transit hub, where all of the buses running the four routes meet.

Route	Notable Stops	Total Stops	Daily Ridership (per weekday)	Average boardings per revenue hour
Blue	Highway 36, LCVI, LCBO, Lindsay Square Mall, Fleming College	70	115	7.5
Green	LCVI, Kawartha Lakes City Hall, Giant Tiger, Ross Memorial Hospital, ServiceOntario, Whitney Town Center, Lindsay Square Mall, Parkview Public School	70	75	4.5
Orange	LCVI, Ross Memorial Hospital, Whitney Town Centre, Lindsay Square Mall, Fleming College, ServiceOntario	50	65	4
Red	Fleming College, Kawartha Lakes City Hall, Whitney Town Center, Lindsay Square Mall	54	95	6.5

== LIMO Specialized Transit ==
Lindsay Mobility Specialized Transit (often shortened to LIMO Specialized Transit) is a paratransit subset of Lindsay Transit that provides door-to-door service for people with physical or functional disabilities.

== See also ==
- Public transport in Canada
