= Grande Prairie Transit =

Transit agency in Alberta, Canada

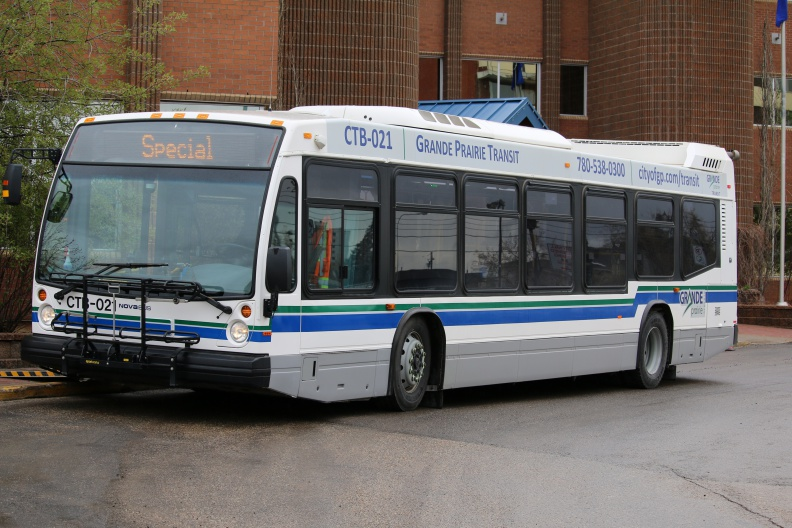
- Founded: 1981
- Locale: Grande Prairie, Alberta, Canada
- Service area: urban area
- Service type: bus service, paratransit
- Routes: 9
- Stations: ~210 stops
- Fleet: 21 buses (including 5 electric)
- Operator: City of Grande Prairie
- Annual budget: CAD 3.3 million (2021)
- Website: Grande Prairie Public Transit
System map
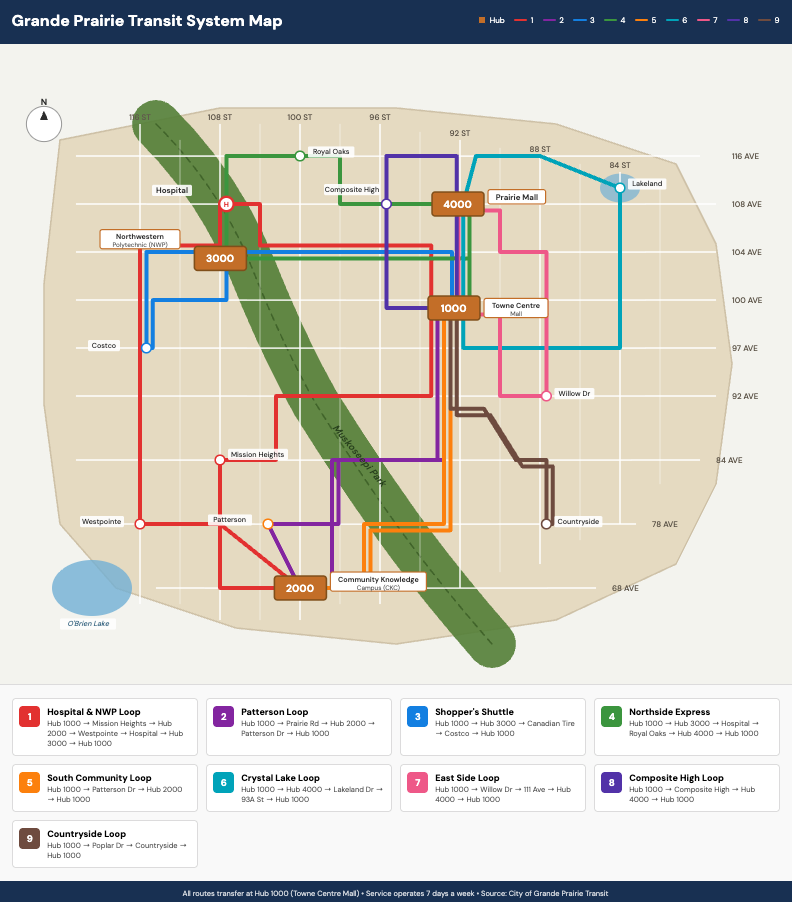

Grande Prairie Transit (marketed as "GP Transit") is the public transportation system serving the city of Grande Prairie in northwestern Alberta, Canada. Established in 1981, the system operates nine fixed bus routes, on-demand transit services, and Paratransit across the city. The service is operated directly by the city.

== History ==
Grande Prairie Transit was founded in 1981 with service contracted to private operator Evergreen Transportation. The Public Works Department was responsible for GP Transit and the vehicles were still owned by the city.

In September 2013, the city brought the drivers in-house, allowing the city to have more flexibility in service quality and cost factors.

=== 2022 transit redesign ===
On August 6, 2022, Grande Prairie Transit implemented a major service restructuring, introducing a hybrid model combining conventional fixed routes with on-demand transit service. The redesign replaced scheduled service in seven lower-ridership neighbourhoods with on-demand transit while adding service to six neighbourhoods that previously had none. Key features included two-way service along 100 Street between downtown and Prairie Mall, and a new "Shoppers Shuttle" route connecting commercial areas.

=== Free youth transit ===
On September 5, 2023, Grande Prairie Transit launched free transit for youth aged 17 and under, making it one of several Canadian municipalities to eliminate youth fares.

== Services ==
Weekday service operates from 6:00 AM to approximately 9:15 PM, with 40-minute frequency during peak hours and 80-minute frequency off-peak. Route 3 (Shoppers Shuttle) maintains 40-minute service throughout the day with the most frequent departures of any route. Weekend and holiday service begins at 8:00 AM with reduced frequency.

All 9 routes operate from the Downtown Transit Hub at Towne Centre Mall (55°10′11″N 118°47′30″W). In September 2024, two new heated bus shelters were installed at this location. Additional heated shelters exist at Northwestern Polytechnic and Community Knowledge Campus. The Transit Office is located at the City Service Centre, 9505 - 112 Street.

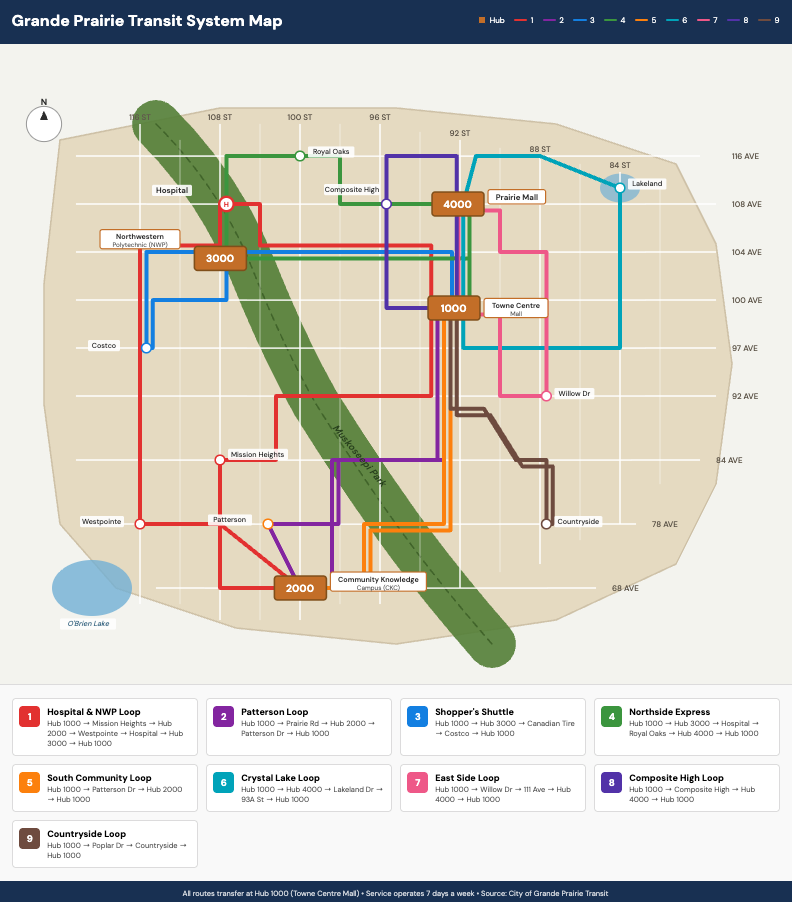
Approximation of GP Transit bus routes

Bus Route Descriptions and Frequencies
No.	Coverage area	Route description	Weekday departures	Weekend departures
1	Highland Park – Mission Heights – Pinnacle/Westpointe	Town Centre Mall, Highland Park, Mission Heights, Pinnacle / Westpointe, Community Knowledge Campus / Eastlink Centre, Grande Prairie Regional Hospital, Gateway Shopping Centers, Northwestern Polytechnic	17	10
2	Patterson – Highland Park	Town Centre Mall, South on 100 Street, Patterson, Highland Park, Community Knowledge Campus/ Eastlink Centre	17	10
3	Shoppers Shuttle	Town Centre Mall, Muskoseepi, Northwestern Polytechnic, Walmart, Canadian Tire, Service Canada, Costco, City Service Centre	23	20
4	Muskoseepi – Royal Oaks – Northridge	Town Centre Mall, Muskoseepi, Northwestern Polytechnic, Grande Prairie Regional Hospital, Royal Oaks, Northridge, Prairie Mall, South on 100 Street	17	10
5	Highland Park – Patterson – Country Club	Town Centre Mall, Highland Park, Patterson, Country Club, Community Knowledge Campus / Eastlink Centre, North on 100 Street	17	10
6	Crystal Ridge – Lakeland Drive – Mountview – Hillside	Town Centre Mall, North on 100 Street, Prairie Mall, Crystal Ridge, Lakeland Drive / Crystal Lake Drive, Mountview, Hillside	17	9
7	ARC Centre – Creekside/Cobblestone – Ivy Lake – Crystal Heights	Town Centre Mall, ARC Centre / Smith, Creekside / Cobblestone, Ivy Lake, Crystal Heights, Prairie Mall, Mountview, City Hall	17	10
8	Farmers Market – Avondale	Town Centre Mall, Farmers Market, Muskoseepi, North on 102 Street, Avondale, Prairie Mall, South on 102 Street	17	10
9	Patterson – Poplar Drive – Countryside South	Town Centre Mall, South on Resources, Patterson, Poplar Drive, Country Side South, North on Resources	15	10

=== On-demand transit ===
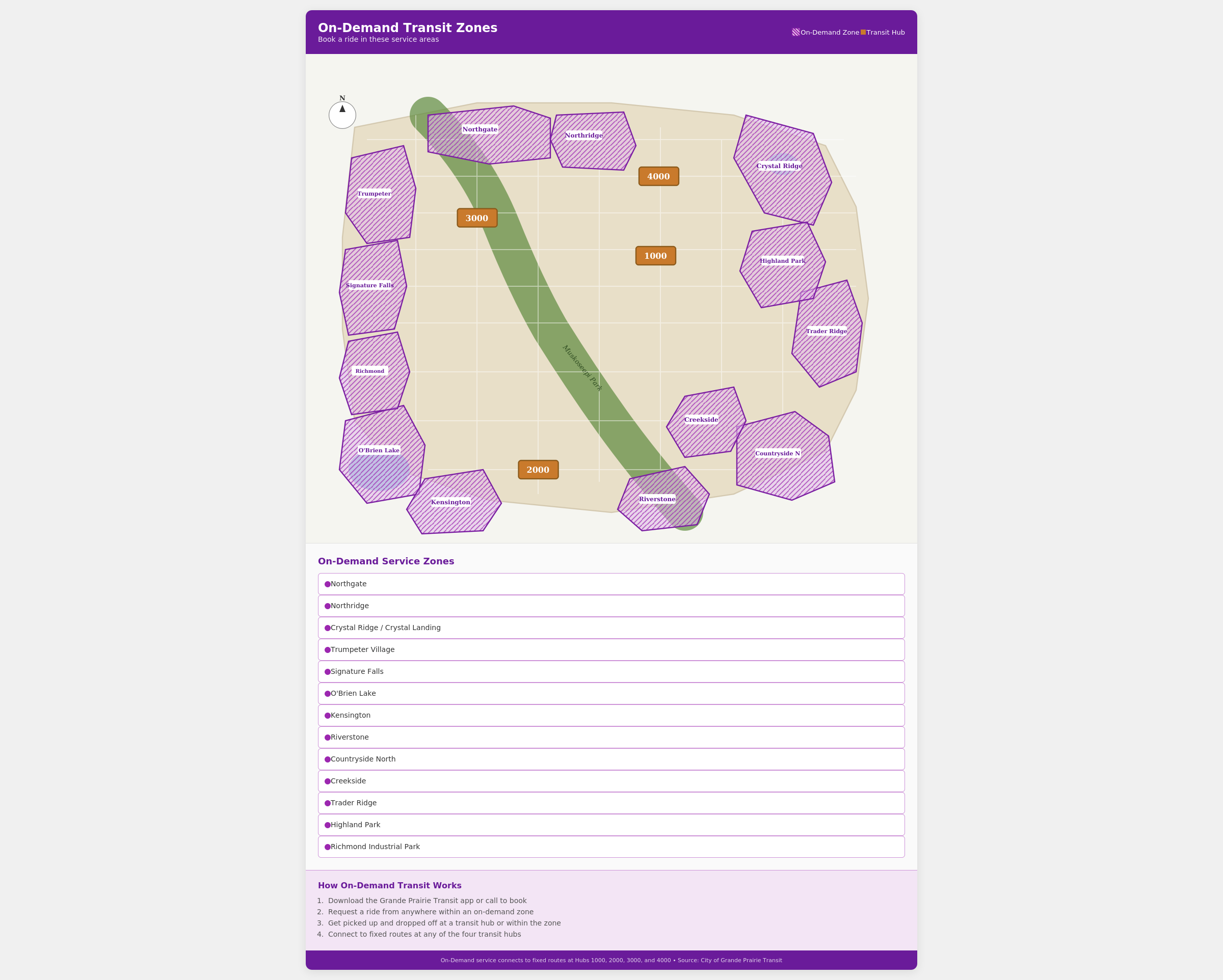
A number of communities beyond the core can request on-demand service

On-Demand Transit is a stop-to-stop, app-based service using smaller shuttle buses in 15 neighbourhoods where fixed routes are less efficient. Riders book trips through the "Grande Prairie My Ride" mobile application or by calling 780-830-RIDE (7433). Neighbourhoods served include Copperwood, Countryside North, Creekside, Crystal Landing, Crystal Ridge, Kensington, Meadowview, Northgate, Northridge, O'Brien Lake, Richmond Industrial Park South, Riverstone, Signature Falls, Trader Ridge, and Trumpeter Village. Late-Night On-Demand Service provides city-wide coverage after fixed routes end, operating Monday–Saturday from 9:00 PM to 11:00 PM and Sunday from 6:00 PM to 8:00 PM.

=== Accessible transit ===
Grande Prairie Accessible Transit (GPAT) is a shared-ride, door-to-door paratransit service for residents age 14 and older who cannot use fixed-route transit due to physical or cognitive disabilities. The service extends to City of Grande Prairie residents and County of Grande Prairie residents within 5 km of city limits, including Clairmont. Eligibility requires completing an application with medical verification. Once approved, riders can book up to 14 days in advance. GPAT does not operate on Christmas Day, New Year's Day, and Easter Sunday.

=== Former services ===
==== County Connector ====
The County Connector was a rural transit service connecting Grande Prairie to Sexsmith, Clairmont, Beaverlodge, Wembley, and Hythe. Launched in December 2018, the service was suspended in April 2020 due to COVID-19 and permanently discontinued in August 2020 due to low ridership.

== Fleet ==
GP Transit operates a mixed fleet of approximately 21 buses, with mostly diesel vehicles. Grande Prairie introduced its first two BYD K7 electric buses in February 2019, with three additional units following. Each electric bus cost approximately $640,000, with the Government of Alberta funding two-thirds through GreenTRIP grants. Solar panels were installed at the City Service Centre to charge the electric fleet.

== Fares ==
Grande Prairie Transit uses the SUPERPASS electronic fare card system for tap-and-go payment. Transfers are free and valid for 120 minutes. Fare increases effective January 1, 2025 were the first since July 2019. As of January 2026, the following scheme applies:

Fare Category	Cash	SUPERPASS 10/20/30 Rides	Monthly Pass	Day Pass	Weekend Pass
Adult (ages 18-59)	$3.25	$24.75/$47.50/$70	$74.25	$7.25	$10.25
NWP Students (ages 18+), Senior (ages 60+)	$3	$20.50/$35/$52.50	$55.50	$6.25	$8.25
Youth (ages 6-17 with Youth SUPERPASS)	Free	N/A	N/A	N/A	N/A
Child (ages 5 & under with paying adult)	Free	N/A	N/A	N/A	N/A
AISH	N/A	N/A	$10.25	N/A	N/A

CNIB cardholders ride free. Low-income residents can receive a 50% subsidy on monthly SUPERPASS costs through the Transit Access Program. Eligibility requires income below the Statistics Canada Low-Income Cut-Off level plus 30%.

== See also ==
- List of public transit authorities in Canada
- City of Grande Prairie
