= Owen Sound Transit =

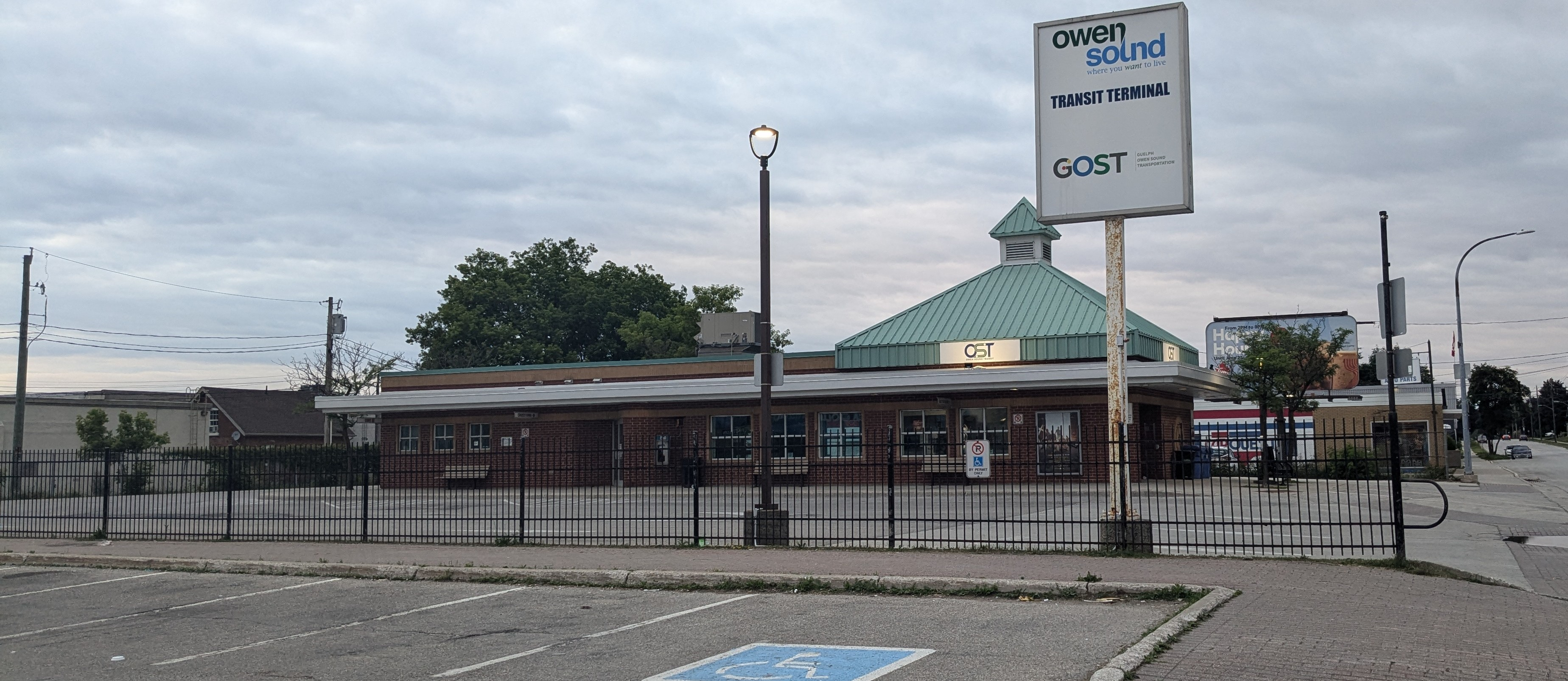
- Downtown terminal in 2024
- Headquarters: 1020 3rd Avenue East
- Locale: Owen Sound, Ontario
- Service area: urban area
- Service type: Bus service, Paratransit
- Routes: 4
- Operator: Miller Transit
- Website: Owen Sound Transit

Owen Sound Transit provides local bus service and specialized transit for the city of Owen Sound, Ontario, which is located at the southwest end of Georgian Bay.

Both of those services operate out of the downtown transit terminal. Regular bus service consists of a four route system with daytime operations from Monday through Saturday. All four routes provide a half-hourly service on Monday to Friday between 6:30 am and 6:00 pm, with a less frequent Saturday service between 9:00 am and 4:00 pm.

== Owen Sound Transit Terminal ==
Location: 1020 3rd Avenue East, Owen Sound
Coordinates: 44°34′06.6″N 80°56′28″W

=== Bus routes ===
- East Bay Shore serves the northeast portion of town, including the hospital.
- Core Route is the central east–west route across 10th Street, including the hospital.
- Crosstown serves the southern part of town.
- Brooke serves the northwestern part of town.

=== Intercity service ===
- Guelph Owen Sound Transit to Guelph (Central Station). Two trips daily in each direction (Owen Sound to Guelph at 7.30 a.m. and 2.30 p.m., Guelph to Owen Sound at 10.38 a.m. and 5.30 p.m.) Launched in 2020 and operated by Voyago, the service's funding has been extended multiple times, the latest until August 31, 2026.
- FlixBus to Toronto (Union Station) via such stops as Meaford, Collingwood, Barrie, and Pearson Airport, operated by partner Gallexy Tours. Originally launched in 2024 under a one-year agreement for use of the Terminal; the agreement was extended for another year in 2025, and recommended for a further extension in 2026.
- Aboutown Transportation had formerly provided scheduled bus service to London. Greyhound Canada previously served Toronto.

== Old Bus Terminal Building ==
Location: 1023 2nd Avenue East, Owen Sound
Coordinates: 44°34′05.7″N 80°56′33″W
History: Constructed in 1945, and designated under the Ontario Heritage Act, this building is an example of Art Moderne. Although no longer a functioning terminal, the style reflects the era of streamlining appropriate for a bus station.

== See also ==
- Public transport in Canada
