= Prince Albert Transit =

Municipal bus service in Saskatchewan, Canada

- Parent: PA Dept. of Public Works
- Headquarters: 1084 Central Avenue
- Locale: Prince Albert, SK
- Service type: bus service
- Routes: 7
- Stops: 187
- Hubs: Central Avenue & 14th Street Transfer Station
- Fleet: 10 buses
- Fuel type: Diesel
- Operator: FirstBus Canada - (2004 - present) Previously operated under Prince Albert Northern Bus Lines - (1946-2004)
- Website: Transit Service

Prince Albert Transit provides local city bus service in the City of Prince Albert, Saskatchewan, Canada.

== Services ==
There are seven scheduled bus routes with the downtown transfer point located at Central Avenue and 14th Street. Like many small transit systems all the routes run on one-way loops, to give better coverage of the city with a limited number of vehicles. There is no transit service to the communities, industrial areas and airport on the north side of the North Saskatchewan River.

=== Scheduled routes ===
Prince Albert Transit operates a total of 7 routes, which are all one-way loops leaving from the central "Transfer Station". On weekdays, all routes operate with 30 minutes frequencies between 6:45am and 6:15pm then with 60-minute frequencies from 6:15 PM to 10:15 PM. On Saturdays, routes 2-6 operate on 30-minute frequencies from 9:45am to 5:15pm. No Sunday or holiday service is provided. As of 21 October 2023, 5 East Flat now operates with a 15-minute frequency from 6:45 AM - 10:15 AM and from 2:15 PM - 5:45 PM on weekdays.

- 1 – Rush Hour Service
- 2 – All Day Express
- 3 – West Hill
- 4 – East Hill
- 5 – East Flat
- 6 – West Flat
- 7 – Core Express

== Bus fleet ==
Prince Albert Transit operates a fleet of 10 buses, consisting of Freightliner M2 Champion Defender. 11, 2027 ARBOC Equess 35’ are in order and are probably arriving on August 1st or sometime later in the year.

== See also ==
- Public transport in Canada
