= Rouyn-Noranda public transit =

L'autobus de ville
- Locale: Rouyn-Noranda
- Service type: bus
- Routes: 2
- Operator: Autobus Maheux
- Website: Autobus | Ville de Rouyn-Noranda

L'autobus de ville is a free public transit service operated by the city of Rouyn-Noranda in northwestern Quebec, Canada.

== Service ==
There are 2 regular scheduled routes, with weekday peak-period extensions to the neighbourhoods of Évain and Granada.

No.	Locations served	Peak-only service	Map
1	Lac-Dufault, Downtown, Cégep de l'Abitibi-Témiscamingue	South to Granada	
2	Montée du Sourire, Cégep, Downtown, Western Rouyn-Noranda	West to Évain	

The city also operates a paratransit service.

== History ==
Rouyn-Noranda reworked its public transit in 2024, shrinking the number of routes from three to two.
