= Tecumseh, Ontario =

Town in Ontario, Canada

Tecumseh
- Town (lower-tier)
- Town of Tecumseh
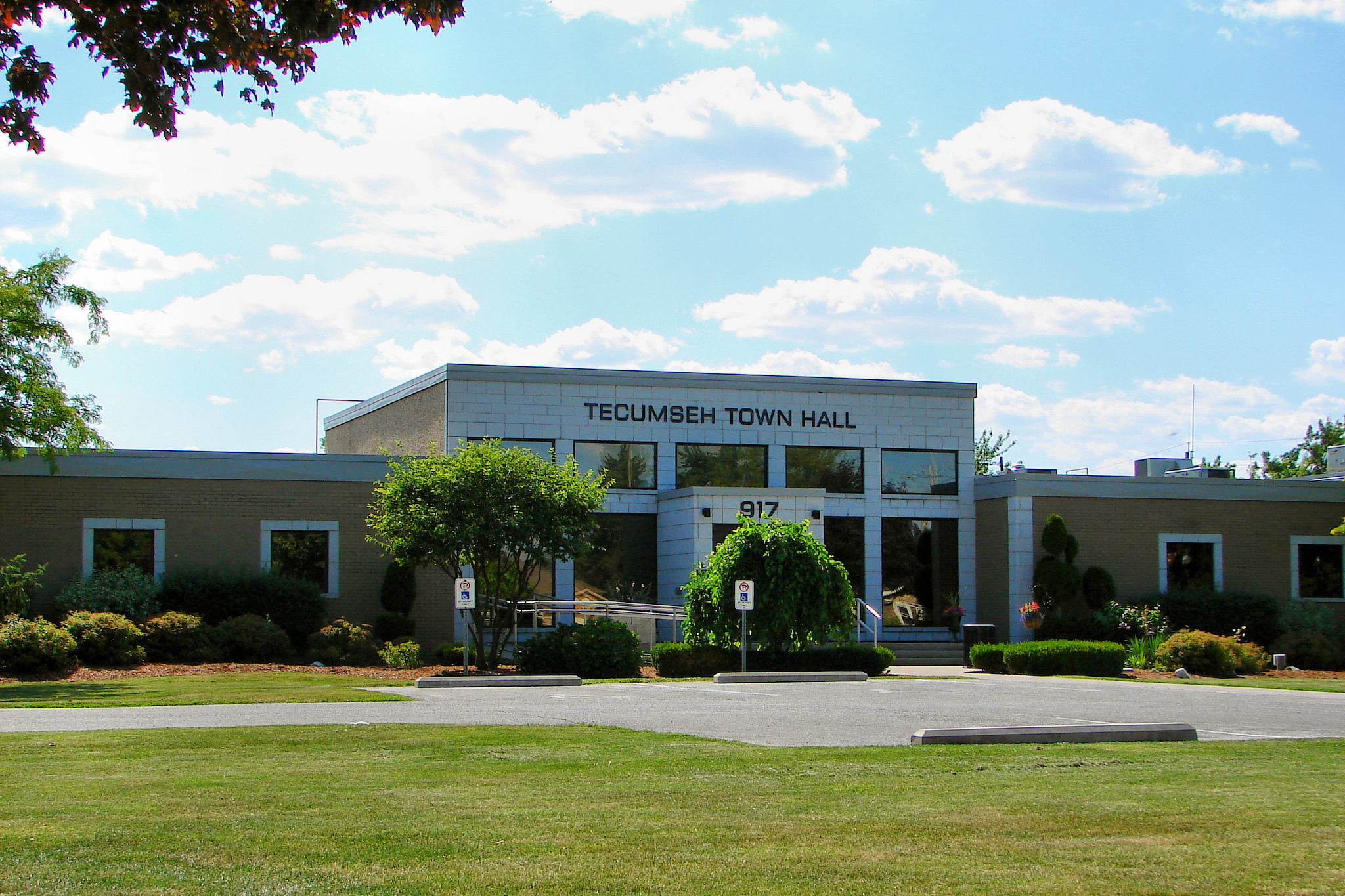
- Tecumseh Town Hall

- Flag Seal
- Motto: A community proud of the past, confident in the future - Une communauté fière de son passé et confiant dans son avenir
- Location within Essex County Location within Southern Ontario
- Coordinates: 42°18′45″N 82°53′07″W
- Country: Canada
- Province: Ontario
- County: Essex
- Founded: 1792

Government
  - Mayor: Joe Bachetti
  - Member of Parliament: Kathy Borrelli Conservative
  - Provincial Representative: Andrew Dowie (PC)

Area
  - Land: 94.64 km^{2} (36.54 sq mi)

Population (2021)
  - Total: 23,300
  - Density: 245.4/km^{2} (636/sq mi)
- Time zone: UTC−5 (Eastern Time Zone)
  - Summer (DST): UTC−4 (Eastern Time Zone)
- Forward sortation area: N8N
- Area codes: 519, 226, and 548
- Website: www.tecumseh.ca

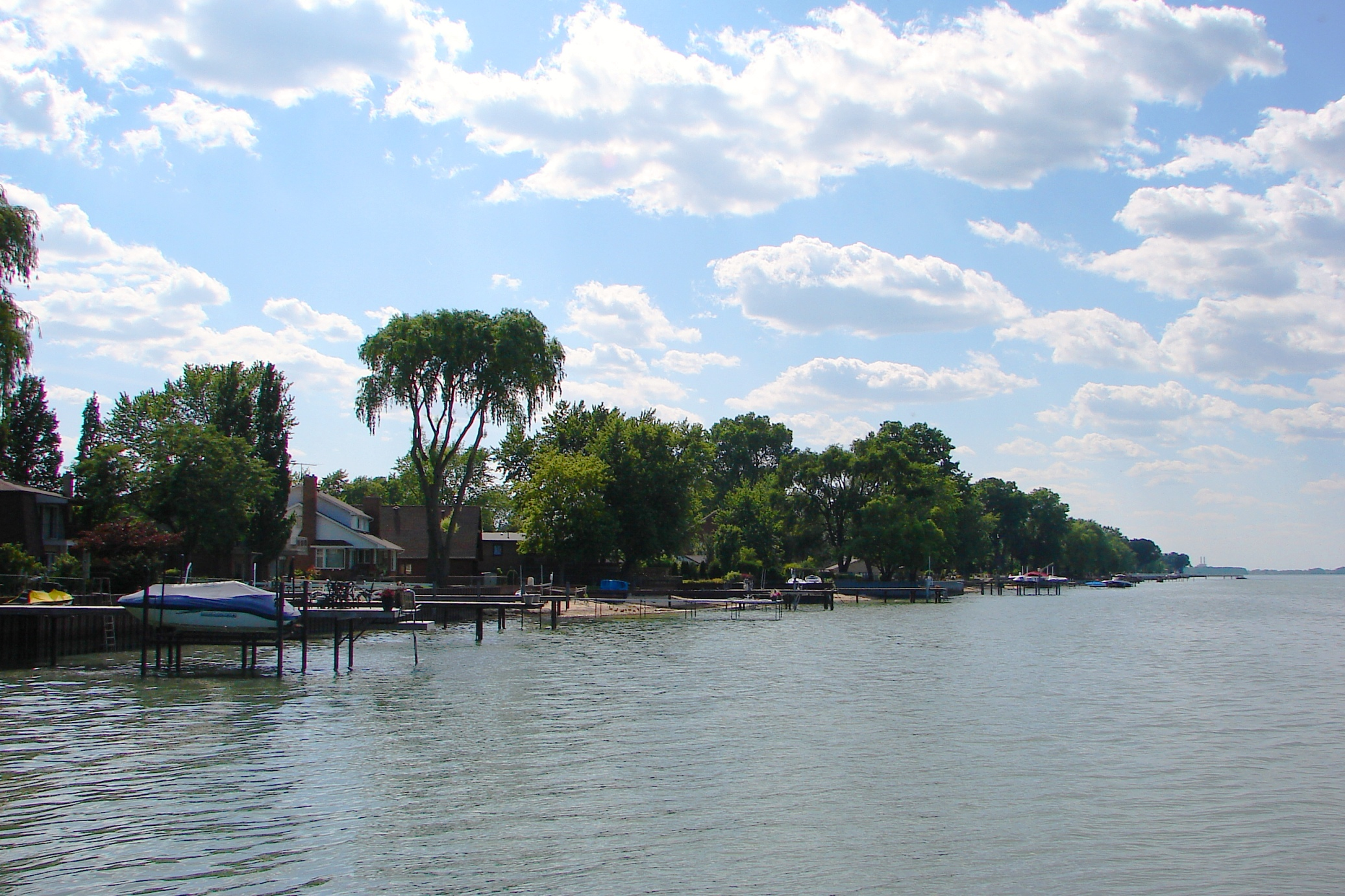
St Clair Beach

Tecumseh (/tɪˈkʌmsi/) is a town in Essex County in Southwestern Ontario, Canada. It is a bedroom community of the City of Windsor and had a population of roughly 23,300 as of the 2021 census according to Statistics Canada. It is part of the Windsor census metropolitan area, and is a part of the Windsor-Essex County region. Tecumseh was originally a Franco-Ontarian settlement.

Food processing is a major industry in Tecumseh, as Bonduelle owns a food processing plant near the town. The plant was built by Green Giant in 1931. Green Giant sold the plant in the late 1990s to Family Tradition Foods, who sold it to Carrière Foods in 2006. Carrière Foods was purchased in 2007 by Bonduelle.

The Tecumseh Corn Festival has been recognized as one of the Top 50 Festivals in Ontario by Festivals and Events Ontario.

Tecumseh is surrounded by Lake Erie, Lake St. Clair and the Detroit River. Detroit is easily accessible to Tecumseh residents by the Ambassador Bridge or the Detroit–Windsor Tunnel, both of which are located within the neighbouring municipality of Windsor.

The town is named after Tecumseh, an 18th-century Shawnee chief and warrior who promoted resistance to the expansion of the United States onto Native American lands.

== History ==
The building of St. Anne’s (Catholic) Parish Church on the corner of Lesperance and Tecumseh Road in 1858 was the start of the Village of Tecumseh. Settled by a few French families who crossed over from the Detroit River. Land Grants to Charles Lesperance in 1796 from the British Administrators of the District of Hess is Tecumseh’s start. Later the building of the Great Western Railway brought job seekers and more settlement. The town became an important railway depot and stopover for travellers. County residents took horse and buggy into Tecumseh and then transferred onto the train, journeying by rail the rest of the way into Windsor. Several hotels were established in Tecumseh to accommodate travellers. The Bedell Hotel, the Soulliere Inn, the Hebert and the Hotel Perreault were some of the places most frequented by travellers and locals alike.

The French were the original settlers of Tecumseh, the majority of them descendants of the Frenchmen who had lived in the area before the arrival of British administrators after the Paris Peace Agreement in 1763. Those that had been living on their River farms kept them. Today the street names from Ouellette Avenue in Windsor to Lesperance Road in Tecumseh are a reminder of the men that cleared the land and farmed it.

As the town of Windsor grew, the overflow of immigrants settled in Tecumseh and other peripheral regions. Indicative of the change was the mix-up created by the introduction of the tomato to the area of Tecumseh. The first post office was opened in 1870, located on the northeast corner of Tecumseh and Lesperance Roads. Called Ryegate Station, its first Postmaster was a Mr. (Joseph) Christie. It was renamed "Tecumseh" in November 1875. Some of the first businesses in Tecumseh included a lumber mill operated by J.B. Cada; a grocery store operated by Arthur Cecile; a cheese factory on Banwell Road operated by Joseph Breault; a bakery owned by John Dugell; three butcher shops; a canning factory and a brewery eventually closed under Carling Brewery. In 1921 it was felt that Tecumseh was not getting its fair share of improvements in proportion to the taxes paid to the municipality of Sandwich East. A group of people headed by Malcolm Clapp petitioned the legislature to separate from the township and incorporate as the Town of Tecumseh with a population of 978. Dr. Paul Poisson was appointed as the first mayor of the town. The real growth in Tecumseh occurred in 1931 with the establishment of the Green Giant Factory as Fine Foods of Canada. Green Giant (now Bonduelle) is still located in Tecumseh and continues to employ full and part-time workers.

As the population grew, so did the demands for services. In 1922 a fire chief was appointed although no fire department was in existence, the fires were fought by town volunteers. The Ontario Provincial Police started policing the town in 1948 with 2 officers.

In 1999, as part of a reorganization of Essex County, Tecumseh was merged with the Village of St. Clair Beach, and the Township of Sandwich South into the Town of Tecumseh. In 2003, the City of Windsor annexed approximately 23 square kilometres (8.9 sq mi) (located south and east of the Windsor International Airport) from the Town of Tecumseh. Now considered to be a bedroom community of Windsor, Tecumseh is often cited as an example of urban sprawl; new subdivisions have developed on some of Canada's most valuable agricultural land beginning in the late 1980s.

== Communities ==
Besides the town proper of Tecumseh itself, the town of Tecumseh comprises a number of villages and hamlets, including Fairplay, Maidstone, Oldcastle, Paquette, Paquette Corners (partially) and St. Clair Beach (formerly from Maidstone Township).

== Governance ==
=== 2022 Town Council ===
The results of the Ontario 2022 Municipal Election for the Town of Tecumseh were announced the night of October 24. The town had a voter turnout of 28.72%. Jennifer Alexander, Acting Clerk signed off on the Official results for the municipal election.

- Mayor: Gary McNamara
- Deputy Mayor: Joe Bachetti
- Ward 1: Alicia Higgison
- Ward 2: James Dorner
- Ward 3: Rick (Rico) Tonial
- Ward 4: Brian Houston
- Ward 5: Tania Jobin

The positions of Mayor, Deputy Mayor, and Ward 4 Councillor were all acclaimed.

== Demographics ==
Historical populations
Year	Pop.	±%
1871	200	—
1911	300	+50.0%
1921	978	+226.0%
1931	2,129	+117.7%
1941	2,412	+13.3%
1951	3,543	+46.9%
1961	4,476	+26.3%
1971	5,165	+15.4%
1981	6,364	+23.2%
1991	10,495	+64.9%
1996	23,151	+120.6%
2001	25,105	+8.4%
2006	24,224	−3.5%
2011	23,610	−2.5%
2016	23,229	−1.6%
2016	23,300	+0.3%

In the 2021 Census of Population conducted by Statistics Canada, Tecumseh had a population of 23,300 living in 8,946 of its 9,111 total private dwellings, a change of 0.3% from its 2016 population of 23,229. With a land area of 94.59 km^{2} (36.52 sq mi), it had a population density of 246.3/km^{2} (638.0/sq mi) in 2021.

The median household income in 2005 for Tecumseh was $90,206, which is above the Ontario provincial average of $60,455. Most of the population is of Franco-Ontarian descent.

Mother tongue:

- English only 17,535
- French only 1,915
- English and French 1,734
- Other language(s) 3,040

Aboriginal population:

- Aboriginal identity population 364
- Non-Aboriginal identity population 23,860

Visible minority population characteristics:

- Chinese 200
- South Asian 460
- Black 55
- Filipino 210
- Latin American 105
- Southeast Asian 87
- West Asian 15
- Visible minority, n.i.e. 35
- Multiple visible minority 10
- Not a visible minority 22,805

Population Distributed by Age (%):

- 0 to 14 years 15.2%
- 15 to 64 years 65.6%
- 65 years and older 19.2%
- 85 years and older 2.2%

The average age in Tecumseh is 43.4 years old.

== Infrastructure ==
=== Schools ===
French Catholic Schools:

- École élémentaire catholique Saint-Antoine – 1317 Lesperance Road, Tecumseh, Ontario
- École élémentaire catholique Sainte-Marguerite d'Youville – 13025 St Thomas Street, Tecumseh, Ontario
- École secondaire catholique l'Essor – 13605 St. Gregory's Road, Tecumseh, Ontario

French Immersion Catholic School:

- St. André French Immersion Catholic Elementary School – 13765 St. Gregory Road, Tecumseh, Ontario

French Immersion Public School:

- Tecumseh Vista Academy/Académie – 11555 Shields Street, Tecumseh, Ontario

English Public Schools:

- A. V. Graham Public Elementary School – 815 Brenda Cr, Tecumseh, Ontario
- Beacon Heights Public Elementary School – 13800 Tecumseh Rd E. Tecumseh, Ontario

English Catholic Schools:

- St. Pius X Catholic Elementary School – 644 Lacasse Boulevard, Tecumseh, Ontario
- Saint Peter Catholic Elementary School – 2451 St Alphonse Rd, Tecumseh, Ontario
- St. Mary's Catholic Elementary School – 12048 County Rd 34, Maidstone, Ontario

Private Schools:

- Académie Ste-Cécile International School – 12021 Tecumseh Rd. East, Tecumseh, Ontario
- Lakeview Montessori School – 13797 Riverside Drive, Tecumseh, Ontario

=== Transit ===
Tecumseh Transit is the municipal bus service, operated by First Student Canada, which commenced on December 21, 2009. A connection has been made to Transit Windsor services at Tecumseh Mall. The Tecumseh Transit service covers 30 kilometres and 43 stops, and operates using two buses.

== Culture ==
=== Tourism and events ===
Tecumseh hosts many special events throughout the year.

- Christmas in Tecumseh (Taking place on November 23, 2018)

The Optimist Club of St. Clair Beach organizes and overseas 2 of Tecumseh's major events

- The Taste of Tecumseh
- Tecumseh Corn and Music Festival (a.k.a. The Tecumseh Corn Festival, or The CornFest).

It is also home to the Tecumseh Historical Museum (a.k.a. Tecumseh Heritage Centre) run by the Tecumseh Area Historical Society (TAHS).

=== Sports ===
Tecumseh is home to the St. Clair Green Giants of the Great Lakes Summer Collegiate League and play at Lacasse Park.

== Notable residents ==
- Joseph Groulx, French-language storyteller
- Zack Kassian, professional hockey player
- Pawel Kruba, CFL player
- Chris Lori, Olympic bobsledder
- Kerby Rychel, professional hockey player
- Dave Steen, Olympic bronze medal-winning decathlete
- Eric Wellwood, professional hockey player
- Kyle Wellwood, professional hockey player
- Jack Studnicka, professional hockey player
- Former NHL players Mark Renaud, Tim Kerr, Bob Boughner, Warren Rychel, Adam Graves, Ernie Godden and Bob Probert (All but Rychel were born in the area, Rychel likely lived in the area during his time with the Spitfires).

== Environment ==
=== Climate ===
Average Temperatures (°C)

High and Low

January: -0.06 and -8.17

February: 1.28 and -7.33

March: 6.56 and -2.94

April: 14.50 and 2.94

May: 20.61 and 8.33

June: 26.33 and 14.00

July: 28.56 and 16.17

August: 27.78 and 15.28

September: 23.78 and 11.28

October: 17.83 and 5.61

November: 8.78 and 0.17

December: 1.89 and -5.83

=== Flooding ===
Recent changes in global climate have caused increased flooding activity through Windsor-Essex, impacting Tecumseh directly. Two major flooding events occurred in 2016 and 2017, resulting in 190 millimetres and 140–200mm of rainfall respectively. During the 2016 flood, over 1500 homes in Tecumseh reported flood damage. The 2017 flood, according to Environment Canada, was the most expensive storm across Canada during 2017, with an insurance payouts totalling $154 million. States of emergencies were called by the Mayor of Tecumseh, as well as the Mayor of Windsor, due to the overwhelming amount of rain that accumulated within the area over such a short period of time.

=== Parks ===
Tecumseh has over 40 parks throughout the municipality, including Lacasse Park, Green Acres Park, and Lakewood Park, which includes a disc golf course which was opened in 2016. The Town maintains 200 acres of parkland within the municipality. The town is also home to the membership-exclusive 18 hole golf course owned by Beach Grove Golf and Country Club.

== Sister towns ==
- (Republic of Ireland) Oldcastle, County Meath, Ireland (April 23, 2009)
- Frosinone, Italy (May 2009)
- Tecumseh, Michigan, United States (January 19, 2013)

== See also ==
- List of townships in Ontario
