= Société des transports de Rimouski =

Public transport organization of Rimouski, Canada

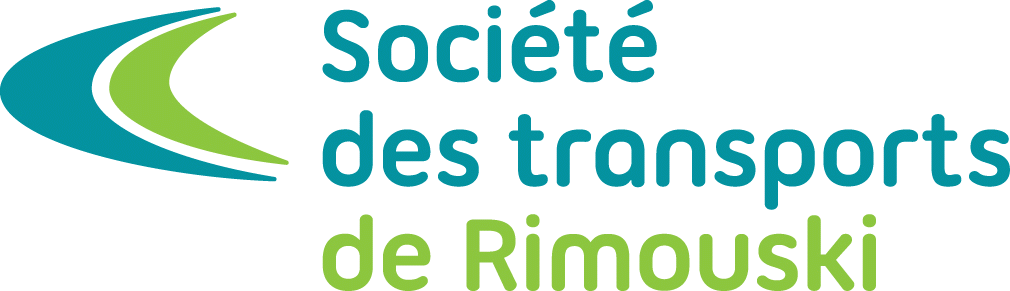
- Headquarters: 380 Avenue de la Cathédrale,
- Locale: Rimouski, Quebec, Canada
- Service type: Bus service, taxibus, paratransit
- Website: Rimouskibus

The Société des transports de Rimouski (French pronunciation: [sɔsjete de tʁɑ̃spɔʁ də ʁimuski]) is an organization that brings together accessible paratransit and regular public transit and taxibus services in the city of Rimouski, on the south shore of the lower Saint Lawrence River in Quebec, Canada.

== Services ==
Put in place in January 2011, Citébus is a system of three regularly schedule bus routes that serves the central urban area; bounded on the west by the Rimouski River, on the east by Rue de l'Expansion, on the north by the St. Lawrence River and on the south by Rue de Normandie. These are Routes 11, 12 and 21.

Taxibus service is organized into five zones and lines identified by colour that cover the other populated areas of Rimouski. These are the Orange Zone, Blue Zone, Green Zone, Red Line and Violet Line.

Partransit service is provided by private contractors and managed by the Société des transports de Rimouski, to meet the needs of residents with disabilities. Eligible users must be preapproved.
