= Sault Area Hospital =

Coordinates: 46.5487°N 84.3114°W

- Algoma Public Health

Geography
- Location: Sault Ste. Marie, Ontario, Canada

Organization
- Care system: Public Medicare (Canada)
- Type: District General

Services
- Emergency department: Yes
- Beds: 289

History
- Founded: 1898

Links
- Website: http://www.sah.on.ca/
- Lists: Hospitals in Canada

The Sault Area Hospital is a medical facility in Sault Ste. Marie, Ontario.

== History ==
The hospital has its origins in the Sault Ste. Marie General Hospital founded by the Grey Sisters of the Cross in 1898 and the Plummer Memorial Public Hospital founded by the Algoma Benevolent Hospital Association in 1917. These two institutions amalgamated in 2002. A new hospital, replaced the two previous facilities, was designed by Stantec and built by a joint venture of Carillion and EllisDon and completed in 2010. The new hospital has 289 beds and provides various services including acute care, general rehabilitation, mental health and cancer radiation therapy. It has 1,652 employees.
