= Réseau de Transport en Commun de Shawinigan =

- Service area: Shawinigan
- Service type: Public Transit
- Routes: 3 routes (1 during Summer)
- Operator: Shawinigan
- Website: http://www.shawinigan.ca/Citoyens/transport-en-commun_19.html

The Réseau de Transport en Commun de Shawinigan is the public transit service provider in Shawinigan, Québec. It operates two routes from Monday to Friday and one route on Saturdays and Sundays. The regular hours of operation for Route 1 are 6:30 am to 5:30 pm Monday to Friday. Route 2 runs from 6:55 am to 9:55 pm from Monday to Wednesday and from 6:55 am to 11:55 pm on Thursday and Friday. Route 3 operates 6:30 am to 11:30 pm on Saturday and 7:30 am to 9:30 pm on Sundays

During the summer, only one route operates Monday–Sunday. The summer hours of operation are 6:30 am to 9:30 pm from Monday to Wednesday, 6:30 am to 11:30 pm Thursday to Saturday, and 7:30 am to 9:30 pm on Sundays. An on demand service called Accès-Bus and an adapted transit service for residents with physical disabilities are also provided.
