= Whistler Transit System =

Coordinates: 50°08′02″N 122°57′17″W

Whistler Transit System Pemberton Valley Transit System

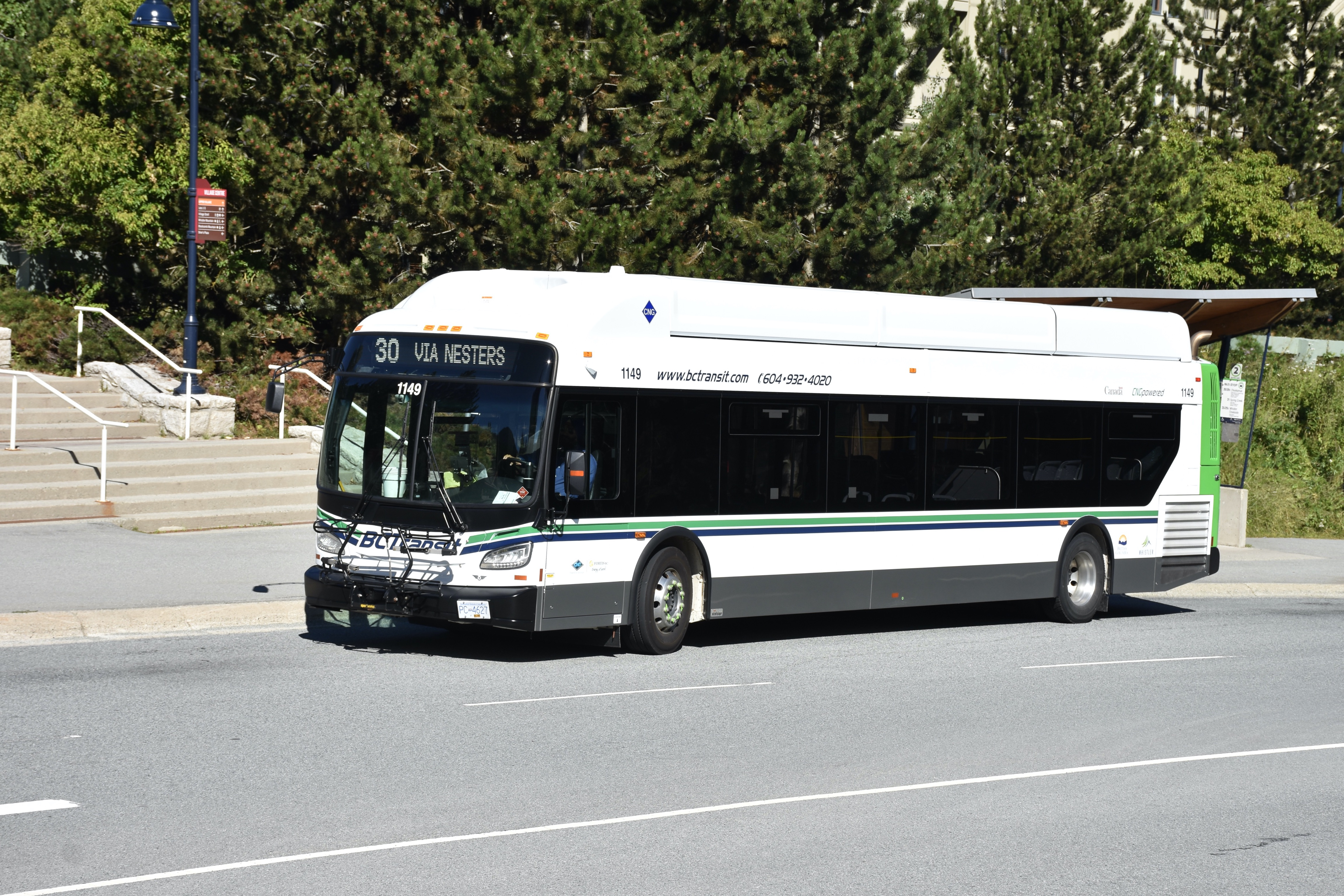
- On route 30 'Emerald via Nesters' at Whistler Village: Gondola Transit Exchange
- Parent: BC Transit
- Founded: 1991
- Headquarters: 8011 Highway 99
- Service area: Whistler
- Service type: Bus service
- Alliance: BC Transit
- Routes: 13
- Destinations: Gondola Transit Exchange, Whistler Village, Alpine, Emerald, Whistler Creek, Spring Creek, & Cheakamus
- Fleet: 36
- Fuel type: CNG
- Operator: Whistler Transit Ltd. and Pemberton Taxi
- Website: https://www.bctransit.com/whistler/home

Whistler Transit Ltd., a division of Keolis, operates the public transit service in Whistler and the Pemberton Valley area of British Columbia, Canada. Buses operate every day between 5:30 a.m. and 3 a.m. and are equipped with racks for skis or bikes, depending on the season.

Funding for the Whistler Transit System is shared between the Resort Municipality of Whistler and BC Transit. Funding for the Pemberton Valley Transit System is shared between BC Transit and the Squamish–Lillooet Regional District through a partnership with the Village of Pemberton and Lil'wat First Nation Bus services in Whistler are operated by Whistler Transit Ltd. while services within Pemberton are operated by Pemberton Taxi.

== Transit facility ==
Whistler Transit Operations and Maintenance Facility was built to accommodate an expansion in the level of service, resulting in a growth of the transit fleet. The building was opened in late 2009, prior to the 2010 Winter Olympics.

Omicron Architecture Engineering Construction acted both as design-builder and consultant for the 25,000-square-foot (2,300 m^{2}) facility, which includes maintenance and administration buildings, refueling stations and covered parking for up to 50 buses.

The project won the Canadian Design-Build Institute's 2010 first place award in the industrial category.

== Routes ==
Whistler Transit operates several local routes in Whistler. Pemberton transit operates a commuter connection to Whistler and a local route around Pemberton.

No.	Name	Notes
4	Marketplace	Winter only
5	Upper Village/Benchlands	
6	Tapley's/Blueberry	
7	Staff Housing	
8	Lost Lake	Summer only
10	Valley Express	
20	Cheakamus	
20X	Cheakamus Express	
21	Spring Creek	
25	Whistler Creek	
30	Emerald via Alpine	
31	Alpine	
32	Emerald	
33	Alpine/Village via Spruce Grove	
99	Pemberton Commuter	Operated by Pemberton Transit
100	Pemberton Local	Operated by Pemberton Transit

== Whistler and Valley Express ==
Whistler and Valley Express

- Previous branding of transit in Whistler
- Defunct: 2009

Transit in Whistler previously operated under a unique branding, whereas most other systems used a standard BC Transit style. With the coming of the Winter Olympics in 2010 and the upgrade of their fleet, a coordinated look was adopted.

== See also ==
- Public transport in Canada
