= Yorkton Transit =

Canadian city transport

- Commenced operation: 2019
- Headquarters: 162 Ball Road
- Locale: Yorkton, SK
- Service type: bus service, paratransit
- Routes: 2
- Stops: 28, plus 5 with occasional service
- Operator: Saskatchewan Abilities Council
- Website: transitliveyorkton.com

Yorkton Transit is the public transportation service offered in Yorkton, Saskatchewan, Canada. It is provided by the Saskatchewan Abilities Council (Sask. Abilities), who also provides service in Swift Current. The service operates two 12-seat Ford Transit vans on two routes. Service runs Monday to Friday from 7 am to 7 pm, and Saturdays from 9 am to 4 pm. No service is offered on Sundays or holidays. Each line starts service at Livingstone Street, behind the Co-Op grocery store. The North line starts service on the half hour and the South line starts on the hour. Service is in a one-way loop on each line. The North line runs a twice-daily commuter service to the Sask. Abilities offices in the northern industrial area. Service started in 2019, after upgrading from a dial-a-ride program that had been in place since 1995. Service reaches the Yorkton Regional Health Centre and the Gallagher Centre, but not the airport.

== Fares ==
Being in a small municipality with a relatively small funding pool, fares are fairly high for the service compared to other cities in Canada. $4.00 is required for a single cash fare (with no mention of a transfer.) Alternatively, a monthly pass goes for $81. Students and children under 18 are charged $3.00 and $40.50, respectively.

== Other services ==
Access transit services are also provided in Yorkton by Sask. Abilities.
