= Leamington Transit =

Canadian bus service

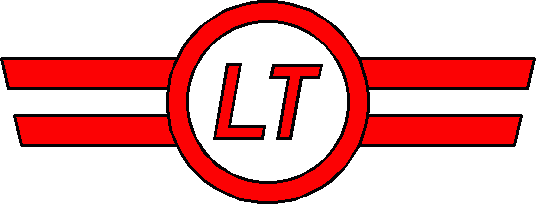
- Defunct: 2022
- Headquarters: 10 Seacliff Drive East
- Locale: Leamington, Ontario
- Service type: bus service
- Routes: 1
- Operator: Switzer-Carty Transportation - Leamington Branch
- Website: Bus Service

Leamington Transit was a public transportation service in Leamington, Ontario Canada. It consisted of a micro coach that serviced the town of Leamington making regular routes Monday to Saturday, 7:00 am – 7:00 pm.

== Route Description ==
The route began at Seacliff Drive, then looped south along Cherry Lane and Robson Road before serving the city's waterfront. It then ran along Erie Street, the city's central artery, to serve various shopping plazas and the County Fair Mall. It then turned along Oak Street and loops along several residential blocks in northeastern Leamington. The bus then ran along Talbot Street through downtown and past the hospital. After serving the Kinsman Recreation Complex, it rejoined Erie Street.

== History ==
The evolution of transportation in Leamington was rapid as the town moved from a colonial town to a more sophisticated town with an uptown business district. According to a population census, in 1876 the population of Leamington included 660 individuals. In 1925 it had grown to 4,351. The first bus driver of a Leamington bus was Driver Oswell Robson, one of the most prominent family names in late 19th century Leamington. This bus serviced the town making frequent stops at homes and the uptown business district.

A major development that occurred that made Leamington a more accessible community was the opening of an electric railway service to Windsor, Ontario via Kingsville, Ontario and Essex, Ontario in 1908. This connection brought Leamington closer together with its county and allowed for more business to occur in Leamington's uptown district. This was a major feat for a fledgling town with a population of only 2,512 residents in 1910. The electric railway system was connected directly to the business district and besides its major use in public transportation; it was used for mass transportation as a troop carrier for World War I.

The electric railway also served as transportation as workers would need to commute to their jobs. For example, many Mennonite individuals who worked at Heinz would have to commute from the Town of Kingsville to Leamington using the street-cars and then when their shift ended, would have to return home.

As the population of the town grew, by 1950 there were 7,525 residents in the Town of Leamington itself, transportation began to evolve. The street cars were eventually removed as funding was eventually poured into creating more paved roads for the ongoing increase in individual automobile use. As the C.A. Bailey bus company was already making frequent school bus stops, they began to follow the lead of other towns and institute their own bus specific for town transit- also known as Leamington Transit.

The official title of Leamington Transit did not come into use until the bus company C.A. Bailey, named after Clarence A. Bailey, became a company in 1946 with its running of the Mac Leamington High School Bus.

On May 2, 2022, Leamington Transit ceased to operate and was replaced by an on demand transit system known as LTGO.

== See also ==
- Public transport in Canada
