= Société de transport de Trois-Rivières =

- Founded: 2002
- Headquarters: 2000, rue Bellefeuille; Trois-Rivières, Quebec; G9A 5J3
- Service area: Trois-Rivières, Quebec, Canada
- Service type: Public transit
- Routes: 12
- Daily ridership: 8200
- Website: www.sttr.qc.ca (in Quebec French)

Logo from 2002 to 2009

Société de transport de Trois-Rivières (STTR) was formed in 2002 to operate transit services, after the merger of the six municipalities that today constitute the city of Trois-Rivières, Quebec, Canada. Previously the Corporation intermunicipale de transport des Forges (CITF) had provided service in the area since 1979. It covers a population of more than 126,000 people with its urban bus routes, school buses and tours, carrying more than 8200 users per day for a total of about 3 million trips a year.

== History ==
Chronology of the transit system operators.

1915 to 1939: Three Rivers Traction Company
1940 to 1975: la Compagnie de Transport St. Maurice
1975 to 1979: Ville de Trois-Rivières
1979 to 2001: Corporation intermunicipale de transport des Forges
2002 to present: Société de transport des Trois-Rivières
