= Marcos Komodromos =

Greek-Cypriot university professor

- Born: August 13, 1986 (age 40)
- Occupations: Author, Radio TV Host, Businessman

Marcos Komodromos (Greek: Μάρκος Κωμοδρόμος; born 13 August 1986) is a Greek-Cypriot author, university professor, TV and radio host, and an entrepreneur. He was born in Nicosia, Cyprus and studied in Geneva, Switzerland, European University Business School and Northcentral University in Arizona.

Komodromos is an associate professor and lectures at the University of Nicosia's Department of Communications. He is an Accredited Charter Instructor of Public Relations and Marketing Communications, a member of the Chartered Institute of Public Relations (CIPR) in the UK, and a Chartered PR Practitioner accredited by the CIPR in London, UK.

== Books ==
- Organizational Justice During Strategic Change - The Employee's Perspective
- Employees' Perceptions of Trust, Fairness, and Management of Change Using an Organizational Justice Framework
