= National University (San Diego, California) =

Private university in San Diego, California, US

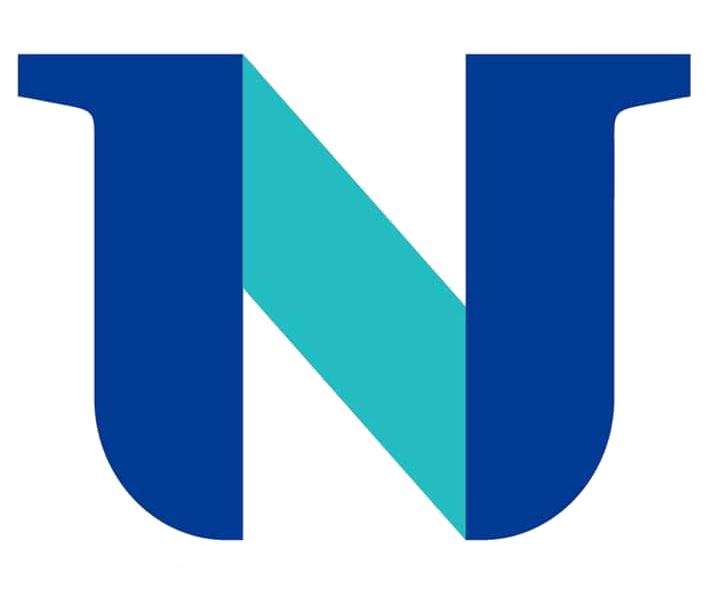
- Motto: Discendo Vivimus (Latin)
- Motto in English: We live through learning
- Type: Private university
- Established: 1971; 55 years ago
- Founder: David Chigos
- Accreditation: WSCUC
- Academic affiliations: NAICU
- President: Mark D. Milliron
- Faculty: 2,721 (full & part-time)
- Students: 23,909
- Undergraduates: 12,089
- Postgraduates: 11,820
- Location: San Diego, California, United States
- Campus: Urban, 20 campuses
- Colors: Blue and Gray
- Mascot: Navi the Navigator
- Website: nu.edu

National University is a private university headquartered in San Diego, California, United States. Founded in 1971, National University offers academic degree programs at campuses throughout California and various programs online. Programs at National University are designed for adult learners. On-campus classes are typically blended learning courses, concentrated to four weeks or on weeknights with occasional Saturday classes. The university uses asynchronous learning and real-time virtual classrooms for its online programs.

== History ==
National University founder David Chigos, a former United States Navy captain and director of employee training for General Dynamics Corporation, established the school as a non-traditional university for working adults. In 1971, National University was organized as a private, nonprofit institution with 27 students. The university's first commencement ceremony had 143 graduates. From 1971 to 1975, the university was based at 1050 Rosecrans Street in Point Loma, San Diego. In 1975, National purchased two properties in Mission Valley as its headquarters. Two years later, National opened teaching facilities in Kearny Mesa and San Diego County. During that time, the school gained approximately 1000 alumni and received accreditation from the Western Association of Schools and Colleges. By 1979, National had purchased a 15-acre (6 ha) campus with 110,000 square feet (10,000 m^{2}) of classroom and library space and 3,500 alumni. National also acquired the Cabrillo Pacific College of Law in 1979, which closed in 1991.

During the 1980s, National expanded by establishing several satellite campuses in California. The School of Education was established in 1980. In 1988, Chigos retired and Jerry C. Lee became the university's second president from 1989 to 2007. During Lee's tenure, campuses were restructured, the university's finances stabilized, National's academics were formally reviewed by accrediting bodies, and affiliate institutions were added to the university. In 1996, the headquarters of the university was moved from Mission Valley to La Jolla and online degree programs were established. The university's board of trustees established the National University System in 2001 with Jerry Lee appointed chancellor of the system. The university was re-organized as a multi-tiered alliance of individual educational and research institutions with each of its respective leaders (including the National University president) reporting to the chancellor. In 2006, National University earned an Emmy Award from the National Academy of Television Arts & Sciences, Pacific Southwest Chapter, for its "One University" commercial. In 2007, Dana Gibson was appointed as National's third president, and Lee became President Emeritus. Two years later, Gibson left National and Patricia E. Potter served as interim president. Michael R. Cunningham became president and chancellor in 2013.

As of 2010, National University was the second-largest private, non-profit institution of higher education in California and the 12th largest private, non-profit organization in the United States. At National University's 40th anniversary, the system had an endowment of over $400 million and real estate valued over $145 million. The university had over 24,000 enrollment with over 130 undergraduate and graduate academic degree programs and 23 teacher credential programs at 28 campuses in California and over 100 online academic programs.

In 2017, the university received recognition in Washington Monthly as a "top school for adult learners".

In 2019, T. Denny Sanford donated $350 million to National University to rename the university's School of Education to the Sanford College of Education. In addition to the name change, a tuition decrease was announced, aided by Sanford's donation.

In 2021, the university was sanctioned by the American Association of University Professors "for infringement of governance standards".

In July 2022, National announced a merger with Northcentral University, an entirely online institution specializing in advanced degrees. The merger was expected to bring the combined enrollment to more than 42,000 students. On October 1, 2022, Mark David Milliron assumed the position of President and CEO of National University.

In 2025, NU was recognized in the updated Carnegie Classification of Institutions of Higher Education with an “Opportunity Colleges and Universities – Higher Access, Higher Earnings” designation.

== Academics ==
National University confers associate degrees, bachelor's degrees, master's degrees, doctoral degrees, and teaching credentials. It also offers continuing education programs. In 2026, the student-faculty ratio at National University was 16:1, and it utilizes a continuous-based academic calendar.

The university is organized as three professional schools and three colleges:

- College of Letters and Sciences
- Sanford College of Education
- College of Business, Engineering, and Technology
- JFK School of Psychology and Social Sciences
- School of Health Professions
- College of Law and Public Service

The university also has a division of Workforce and Continuing Education, which houses continuing education, professional development programs, and 23 teacher credential/certificate programs. Since 1996, National University offers more than 100 degree programs through over 1,500 courses online.

=== Accreditation and approvals ===
National University is accredited by the WASC Senior College and University Commission (WSCUC). In addition to being accredited by WSCUC, specific programs or units at the university are:

- Accredited by the International Assembly for Collegiate Business Education (IACBE)
- Accredited by the National Council for Accreditation of Teacher Education (NCATE), and California Commission on Teacher Credentialing (CTC)
- Accredited by the Commission on Collegiate Nursing Education (CCNE) for the offering of the Bachelor of Science in Nursing Program
- Accredited by the Accreditation Board for Engineering and Technology (ABET)
- Accredited by the Council on Education in Public Health (CEPH)
- Accredited by the American Bar Association in Paralegal Studies and Paralegal Certification

National University received sanctions in 2021, threatening its regional accreditation, when a scathing report from the American Association of University Professors revealed the institution made a series of sweeping changes that included firing 50 full-time professors, six associate vice presidents, unilateral changes to the school's governance structure, consolidation of its libraries into a central library without any meaningful consultation with the faculty or library staff, closing several campuses across California, and bypassing the faculty when making decisions regarding the discontinuation of several academic programs.

=== Graduation rate ===
National's graduation rate for the 2014 academic year is 71% at undergraduate level and 65% at the graduate level.

=== College of Letters and Sciences ===
National University's College of Letters and Sciences provides undergraduate, general education courses to students enrolled in all other schools of the university. The college itself has four departments and offers an Associate of Arts degree, liberal arts bachelor's degrees in biological science, history, and psychology. It also offers master's degrees in creative writing, English, film studies, gerontology, and strategic communications.

=== College of Business, Engineering, and Technology ===
The College of Business, Engineering, and Technology is composed of the School of Business and Economics, and the School of Technology and Engineering. The college is guided by a set of values: The Whole Human Ecosystem; Excellence, Unconstrained by Convention; Future Focused; and Social Justice, Equity, Diversity, and Inclusion (S-JEDI) Advantage. The college provides lifelong learners with credentials of value wherever they are in their educational journeys, offering degrees and certificates from associate to doctoral, both online and on-campus. The School of Business and Economics is composed of two departments: Finance, Economics, Marketing, & Accounting; and Leadership, Management, & Human Capital. Within the school's program portfolio, the school offers a Bachelor’s in Business Administration, Master of Business Administration (MBA), Master of Accountancy, and Master of Science in Organizational Leadership[24], along with other market-relevant programs. The School of Technology and Engineering and offers degree programs in engineering, technology, computer science, and other related fields. The school focuses curriculum on management information systems, construction engineering, electrical engineering, and information technology management. Both the BS in Electrical and Computer Engineering and the BS in Computer Science are ABET accredited.

=== Sanford College of Education ===
The College of Education offers bachelor's degrees, master's degrees, certificates, and education credentials in areas including teaching, school counseling, school psychology, special education, early childhood education, and school administration. National holds teaching contracts with 643 California school districts and approximately 70% of the 26,000 teachers in San Diego County earned teaching credentials from National University. In 2015, National University renamed the School of Education to the Sanford College of Education in honor of philanthropist T. Denny Sanford. The college also houses the Sanford Education Center and two of its programs: the Sanford Harmony Program which promotes respect and understanding of differences among children by expanding understanding and acceptance of gender differences at an early age to positively affect adult relationships and the Sanford Institute of Philanthropy which offers a certificate in cause sales and hosts various professional development workshops in nonprofit management.

=== School of Health Professions ===
The School of Health Professions offers undergraduate and graduate degree programs in healthcare administration, nursing, public health, allied health, and clinical laboratory science.

== Campus locations ==
National University is geographically dispersed, with its academic and administrative centers located in San Diego, California. These centers include administrative offices of the president, vice presidents, school deans and department chairs, financial aid, registrar, and admissions. From its administrative center, the university maintains its academic campuses throughout urban areas in California. The university's satellite campuses are located in:

- San Diego County
- Fresno
- West Los Angeles (LAX area)
- Oxnard
- Rancho Cordova (Sacramento)
- San Jose

== Organization ==
The National University system is governed by a board of trustees and is headquartered in La Jolla, California. The board meets three times a year, consisting of 25 voting members with two ex-officio members (the president of the university and the chancellor of the system) also holding voting privileges.

=== National University System ===
National University is the flagship institution of the National University System. In addition to National University, there are four academic affiliates and two research institutes of the National University System:

- City University of Seattle, Seattle, Washington (affiliated since 2013)
- National University Academy, Vista, California (established 2008)
- National University Virtual High School, Chula Vista, California (established 2003)
- The Center for Performance Psychology
- The National University System Institute for Policy Research

John F. Kennedy University was an affiliate of the National University System from 2009 until JFKU was closed in 2020, at which time JFKU's programs were continued by other universities in the National University System.

Northcentral University was an affiliate from 2019, then fully merged into National University in 2022, with its programs continuing at National University.

== Student body ==
Race and ethnicity of students (Fall 2023)
1. White/Caucasian (30.0%)
2. Black or African American (15.0%)
3. Two or more races (4.00%)
4. Hispanic or Latino (33.0%)
5. Asian (8.00%)
6. American Indian or Alaska Native (1.00%)
7. Native Hawaiian or other Pacific Islander (1.00%)
8. Unknown (9.00%)

National University has open admissions and is the second-largest private, non-profit institution of higher education in California by total enrollment. For the 2022-2023 academic year it charged tuition and fees of US$13,320, with 69% of students receiving grants or scholarships.

As of 2017, the average age of its students is 32. National University had a fall 2023 enrollment of 19,924 students, with 10,151 undergraduates and 9,773 graduate students. In 2026, approximately 40% of students were full-time, 54% of students in 2023 were female, and 82% were over the age of 25.

== Notable alumni ==
- Lloyd Bryan Molander Adams, co-founder of Extreme Sports Channel
- Chris Brown, Mayor of Hawthorne, California
- Ocky Clark, runner
- Thomas S. Crow, Master Chief Petty Officer of the Navy from 1979 to 1982
- Duke Cunningham, US Navy fighter pilot ace, 7 term US Congressman, and convicted felon
- Gerry Czarnecki, business executive and author of books on leadership principles
- Marti Emerald, local television journalist and city council member from San Diego, California
- Brian Graham, major league baseball coach
- Isadore Hall III, California state senator
- Chief Phil Lane, Jr., a leader of American indigenous peoples
- Steven Paul Logan, United States district judge, who being a Marine Corps Colonel (now reserve) concurrently serves on the Navy-Marine Corps Court of Criminal Appeals
- Rich McCormick, U.S. Representative from Georgia (2023-present)
- Weston Ochse, author
- Frank Pastore, major league pitcher and radio host
- Jerry Sanders, former mayor and earlier chief of police of San Diego, California
- Erick Thohir, Indonesia's 10th Minister of State Owned Enterprises, Chair of the Football Association of Indonesia, majority owner of two professional soccer teams
- Billy Pat Wright, multi-term member of the Missouri House of Representatives
- Ryan Zinke, U.S. Secretary of the Interior, Navy SEAL, U.S. Navy commander, special operations commander during Iraq War, later elected the U.S. representative from Montana
- Jaime Bonilla, Governor of the State of Baja California in Mexico
