= Phil Lane Jr. =

- Born: 1944 (age 80–81); Lawrence, Kansas
- Education: MA Education, National University; MA Public Administration, University of Washington
- Alma mater: University of Washington
- Occupations: International Indigenous Humanitarian and Educator, Native American Elder, Film and Video Producer
- Spouse: Suthida
- Parent(s): Lena Parker Vale; Philip Nathan Lane Sr. (1915-2004)
- Relatives: Siblings - Deloria Bighorn (Jacob), of Duncan, BC - Michael Finnegan (Denise) of Snohomish
- Website: 4worlds.org

Phil Nathan Lane Jr. (born 1944) is an enrolled member of the Ihanktonwan Dakota and Chickasaw Nations, and is a citizen of both Canada and the United States. With master's degrees in Education at National University and Public Administration at the University of Washington, Phil Lane Jr. is an indigenous leader in human and community development. The founder and chairman of the Four World's International Institute (FWII), an organization dedicated to "unifying the human family through the Fourth Way", Chief Phil Lane Jr. is the recipient of many awards, including the John Denver Windstar Award, and is a frequent speaker on behalf of indigenous rights and wisdom.

A film and video producer, community leader, writer, speaker, educator, consultant and editor, Lane is the co-author with Jon Ramer of "Deep Social Networks and the Digital Fourth Way" a document that outlines sixteen principles as a road map for creating holistic change using internet technologies as a basis by which to share with indigenous peoples globally. Lane has spent the greater part of his life building alliances, especially with native peoples, in both of the Americas in fulfillment of native prophecies concerning the reunification of the "Eagle and The Condor" Most recently, Lane was featured in the film "The Shift of the Ages" which explores the topic of the Mayan 2012 calendar prophecies.

== Biography ==
Lane was born in Lawrence, Kansas at the Haskell Indian school where his parents met. During the past 44 years, he has worked with Indigenous peoples in North, Central and South America, Micronesia, Southeast Asia, India, Hawaii and Africa. He is the Founder and Coordinator of the Four Worlds International Institute, as well as the Chairman of Four Directions International, an Aboriginal company, which was incorporated in 1996 as Four Worlds' Economic Development Arm.

Lane is an author and film producer with film credits including the National Public Television series "Images of Indians" with the late Will Sampson, "Walking With Grandfather", "The Honor of All: The Story of Alkali Lake" and "Healing the Hurt"

== Organizations founded ==
- Four Worlds International Institute (FWII).
- Four Worlds Foundation Panama

== Awards and appointments ==
- Windstar Award
- The Year 2000 Award from the Foundation for Freedom and Human Rights in Berne, Switzerland
- 14th Annual Ally Award by the Center for Healing Racism in Houston, Texas

== Films and publications ==
- "Walking With Grandfather", Producer The Four Worlds Development Project and Phil Lucas Productions (1988).
- "Sharing Innovations That Work", Executive Producer. Produced by The Alkali Lake Indian Band, The Four Worlds Development Project and Phil Lucas Productions (1986).
- "Honor of All, Parts I and II", Executive Producer. Produced by the Alkali Lake Indian Band, The Four Worlds Development Project and Phil Lucas Productions (1986).
- "Where We've Been and Where We're Going, Parts I and II", Executive Producer. Produced by the Four Worlds Development Project, The University of Lethbridge (1983).
- "The Great Wolf and Little Mouse Sister", Executive Producer. Produced by The Four Worlds Development Project, The University of Lethbridge (1983).
- "Images of Indians", Administrative Producer. Produced by KCTS Television and United Indians of All Tribes Foundations, Seattle, Washington (1978).
- Co-Author with Jon Ramer: "Deep Social Networks and the Digital Fourth Way"
- Co-Author with Jon Ramer: "Utilizing the Digital 4th Way As A Platform for Building A People Centered ASEAN"
- "The Fourth Way: An Indigenous Contribution to Building Sustainable and Harmonious Prosperity in the Americas"
- Co-Author "The Sacred Tree" (1985).
