= Ramer =

Ramer may refer to:

== Places in the United States ==
- Ramer, Alabama, an unincorporated community in Montgomery County, Alabama
- Ramer, Tennessee, a city in McNairy County, Tennessee
- Ramer Field, a stadium in River Falls, Wisconsin

== People ==
- Alexis Manaster Ramer (born 1956) is a Polish-born American linguist
- Donald James Ramer is a Canadian police officer
- George H. Ramer (1927–1951), United States Marine Corps officer
- Jon Ramer (born 1958), American entrepreneur, civic leader, inventor, and musician
- Rodica Ramer physicist / engineer, working in the field of microelectronics technologies

== Things ==
- Ramer Sumati is a 1985 Bangladeshi drama
