= Dana G. Hoyt =

President of
Sam Houston State University

Term	September 1, 2010 - August 14, 2020
Predecessor	James F. Gaertner
Alma Mater	Texas Woman's University
	University of Texas at Arlington

Dana Gibson Hoyt was the thirteenth president of Sam Houston State University. She was appointed on September 1, 2010, following unanimous approval by The Texas State University System. She is the first female president in the university’s history.

== Accomplishments ==
Dr. Hoyt is a product of the Texas educational system, growing up and attending schools in north Texas. She also attended Texas universities, earning a Bachelor of Science degree in business-accounting and a Master of Business Administration at Texas Woman's University and a doctorate in business at the University of Texas at Arlington.

A Certified Public Accountant since 1984, Dr. Hoyt began her career in private industry. In 1986 she joined academia when she was employed by Texas Woman’s University as a lecturer in accounting and management information systems. She was promoted to assistant professor in 1989, and later received tenure as an associate professor of accounting and management information systems.

In 1996, Dr. Hoyt was named TWU’s special assistant to the vice president for finance and administration. She was promoted to associate vice president for finance and administration and university controller and was named vice president for academic and information services in 2000.

She left Texas Woman’s University to become vice president for finance and administration of the YMCA of Metropolitan Denver (Colorado). After serving two years, she was named vice chancellor for administration and finance at the University of Colorado at Denver (and Health Sciences Center) where she oversaw a budget of more than $700 million with funded research of $300 million.

Dr. Hoyt returned to Texas as the vice president for business and finance at Southern Methodist University. After her service at SMU, she was selected as president of National University, the second largest not-for-profit university in California.

In 2009, she joined Sam Houston State University as vice president for finance and operations. Her responsibilities included the administration of many of the business functions of the university including the controller’s office, budget, auxiliary operations, procurement, property, public safety, parking, human resources, facilities management, construction and planning, information resources, and institutional research and assessment.

In 2014, the SHSU president, who had previously been known as Dana L. Gibson, announced that she had married and would be known as Dana G. Hoyt.
