= Michael R. Cunningham =

University adminitstrator

Michael R. Cunningham is chancellor of the National University System. He previously also served as president of the university between 2013 and 2016. Prior to this he was dean of the College of Business Administration at San Diego State University. For most of his career, Cunningham was a business executive. He was the founder of Cunningham Graphics International, which was listed on the NASDAQ in 1998.

== Education ==
Dr. Cunningham earned his bachelor's degree in marketing and business management from the Isenberg School of Management at the University of Massachusetts, Amherst in 1982, his master's degree in graphic communications, management and technology from New York University in 1996, and his Ph.D. in administration, leadership and technology from New York University in 2005.

== Business career ==
Cunningham worked as a sales executive for Gibson Graphics in New York from 1981 to 1983. He later became a senior vice president of sales for Scott Printing in New Jersey. He then founded Cunningham Graphics International (CGII) in 1983 as a printing brokerage, and opened his own printing facility in 1989. CGII would grow to become one of the largest printing companies in the world according to the Wall Street Journal, and he took the company public on NASDAQ in 1998. The company was sold to Automatic Data Processing (ADP) in 2000 for $127.6 million; at that time it had eighteen production sites globally and employed approximately 1,300 people. A management group then repurchased the company piecemeal between 2004 and 2006, naming the amalgamation the Diversified Global Graphics Group. In 2007 Cunningham returned to act as president and CEO of the company, which he renamed DG3, until 2010.

== Academic career ==
Cunningham worked as an adjunct professor at NYU, teaching quality control and also taught at Cal Poly San Luis Obispo. Following his PhD, he began teaching management and entrepreneurship courses at San Diego State University in 2005. In 2011 he was named dean of the College of Business Administration. Between 2013 and 2016, Cunningham served a dual role as both chancellor of the National University System and president of National University. Following 2016, he remained chancellor of the university system.

He served as chair for NYU's Graphic Communication, Management, and Technology Center and as its curriculum committee chair. He also served as an alumni trustee of New York University and the chair of the Graphic Communications Advisory Board at Kean University. In addition, he is a member of the executive committee of the Association of Independent California College and Universities, and he serves on the education committee for CalChamber. He is also a member of the San Diego Regional Economic Development Corporation, and former chair of the Hall of Champions Museum Committee. He is also a trustee of the NYU Steinhardt School of Culture, Education, and Human Development Dean's Council. He also serves on the board of governors for the Center for Creative Leadership.

== Recognition ==
In 1995 Cunningham was named New Jersey Small Business Administration's Business Person of the Year In 2010, Cunningham was honored by Gamma Chapter of Gamma Epsilon Tau, the national graphic arts honor society, with a Gold Key Award.

== Philanthropy ==
Michael Cunningham has served on the boards of the San Diego Foundation, the Christ Hospital Foundation of New Jersey, and the Boys and Girls Clubs of New Jersey. He is a contributor to Sanford Burnham Research, San Pasqual Academy, and the San Diego Sports Commission. Cunningham also has supported efforts to increase housing opportunities for military veterans. As Honorary Chair for the Epilepsy Foundation of San Diego's 2017 Gingerbread City Gala, Cunningham raised approximately $400,000, which was the most the gala had raised over its history.
