= Lloyd Bryan Molander =

American film director

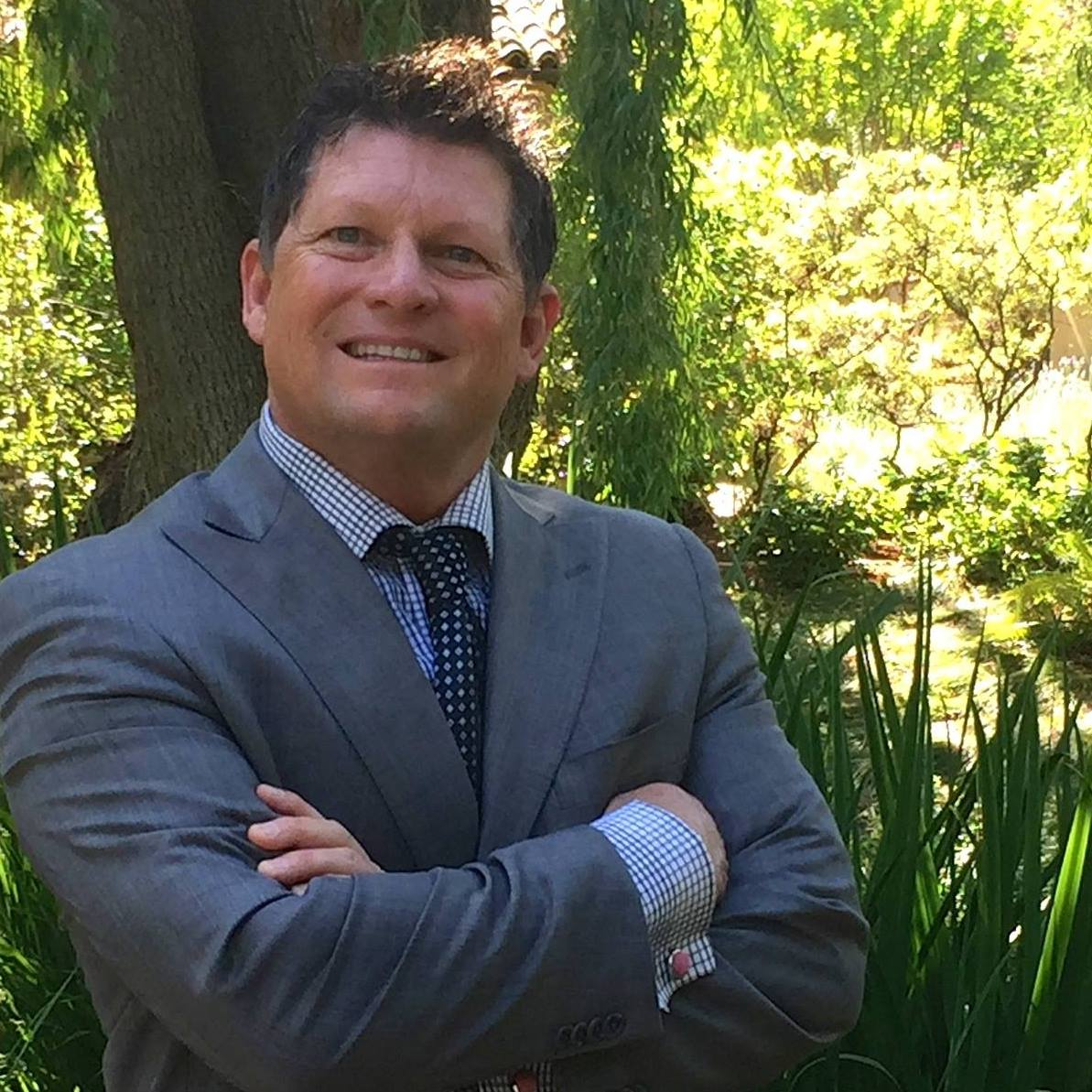
- Born: San Jose, California
- Education: San Diego State University; McGeorge School of Law; National University
- Occupations: Executive Producer, Producer, Director, Channel Corporate Executive Management, Adjunct Professor of Business

Lloyd Bryan Molander (born 17 May 1961) is an American documentary, television and film director, and producer.

== Television series and specials ==
- Saving Heroes on American Heroes Channel - Executive Producer and directed several episodes.
- Outdoor Channel (45 original series) - Executive Producer
- Duck Commanders
- Savage Wild
- Ultimate Match Fishing
- Men’s Pro Ski Tour (CBS)
- The Extremists (CBS)
- Fusion TV (Fox Sports)
- Elite XC and Pro Elite (CBS-Showtime) - consultant
- Hawaiian Tropic Pageant (HD Net)
- Planet X TV (syndicated)
- New Waves (78½ hours, Fox Sports)
- High Octane (Fox Sports)
- "Saving Heroes" (Discovery Channel AHC)
- "Seeking Nirvana" (EdgeTv)
- "Liquid Edge" (EdgeTv)

== Films ==
Molander has directed and produced feature films, including The Outside and Left and Loose on the Lot, and also noted 35MM shorts "Neighbor Upstairs" and "News Junkie".

In 2016 Molander was one of the executive producers of two documentaries 1. "Rising Tides" and 2. "Remember US" both of which were nominated for an Emmy award and "Remember US" won the Emmy.

=== Film festivals ===
Molander's film The Six Degrees of Helter Skelter was an official selection for "Best Documentary" at the Hollywood International Film Festival, and his "Helter Skelter" film was also an official selection for the Temecula Valley International Film Festival, the Burbank International Film Festival, the Big Bear Lake International Film Festival, the Lake Arrowhead Film Festival, and the Ava Gardner Independent Film Festival.,

Molander's film, Do You Dream in Color, won Best Documentary at the SLO Film Fest as well as multiple best documentary accolades.

His feature film The Outside won acclaim when the film's lead actor Michael Graziadei won the "Best Actor" award at the Honolulu Film Festival. It was also an official selection for the festival and garnered a nomination there for "Best Film".

Molander was the founder and managing director of the Dana Point Film Festival.

== Awards and honors ==
Molander was part of a team which was nominated in 2014 for a Mid-Atlantic Emmy Award for Six Hours, a documentary on Typhoon Yolanda. and nominated again for "Rising Tides" and Remember Us. Emmy Site (Mid Atlantic Chapter)

== Professional organizations ==
Molander is a member of the Producers Guild of America and the Academy of Television Arts and Science. He is also a member of the American Film Institute and served on the Board of Directors at the Tahoe-Reno International Film Festival as the head coordinator in charge of the adventure film categories. Adams was also a senior vice president of the Perugia International Film Festival.

Molander is a member of the American Bar Association.
