= St. Clare's Monastery (Duncan, British Columbia) =

Coordinates: 48.8086°N 123.6861°W

St. Clare's Monastery is a monastery of the Order of St. Clare in Duncan, British Columbia, Canada. The nuns of the order also go by the name "Poor Clares". They are a contemplative community of women who live the charism of Saint Clare of Assisi and form the Second Order in the movement started by Saint Francis of Assisi.

== History ==
In 1912, three nuns came to Victoria, British Columbia from New Orleans, Louisiana. They established on December 8, 1912, the first English-speaking monastery of the Primitive Observance of St. Clare in Canada. While the community grew for a time, the climate proved difficult for many members of the community, and most returned to the monastery in New Orleans.

Three of the nuns decided to remain and struggled for years establishing their way of life in the remoteness of Vancouver Island. Eventually they began to receive applicants who preserved in their way of life, and the community took root.

Due to the growing urbanization of the city of Victoria, and the difficulty of maintaining the large monastery which they had built, the community relocated in 1973 to Duncan. They remain a small community, numbering only eight in 2010, but the natural beauty of their current setting provides a setting they find more conducive to their way of life. In 2012 they celebrated 100 years of ministry in the Diocese of Victoria.

In September 2018 the 5 remaining sisters moved from their large building at 2359 Calais Road in Duncan to the smaller former residence of the Franciscan Friars just across the road. They now live out their contemplative life of prayer at 2382 Calais Road.
