= Cowichan Symphony Society =

Performing arts organization in British Columbia, Canada

The Cowichan Symphony Society is a performing arts organization for classical music based in Duncan, British Columbia. It was founded in 1955.

The Society promotes classical music through concerts and music education programs within the Cowichan Valley. The Cowichan Symphony Society Board compiles a series of classical music concerts from a variety of sources for the Society. Concerts are selected, priced, and scheduled by the Board for their year-long season, which members may subscribe to on a year-to-year basis, or they may purchase tickets for individual shows.

The Cowichan Symphony Society often partners with the Victoria Symphony to offer concerts at the Cowichan Theatre, within the Cowichan Community Centre. The Society has also collaborated with the Vancouver Island Symphony in the past.
