= Duncan, British Columbia =

Duncan
- City
- The Corporation of the City of Duncan
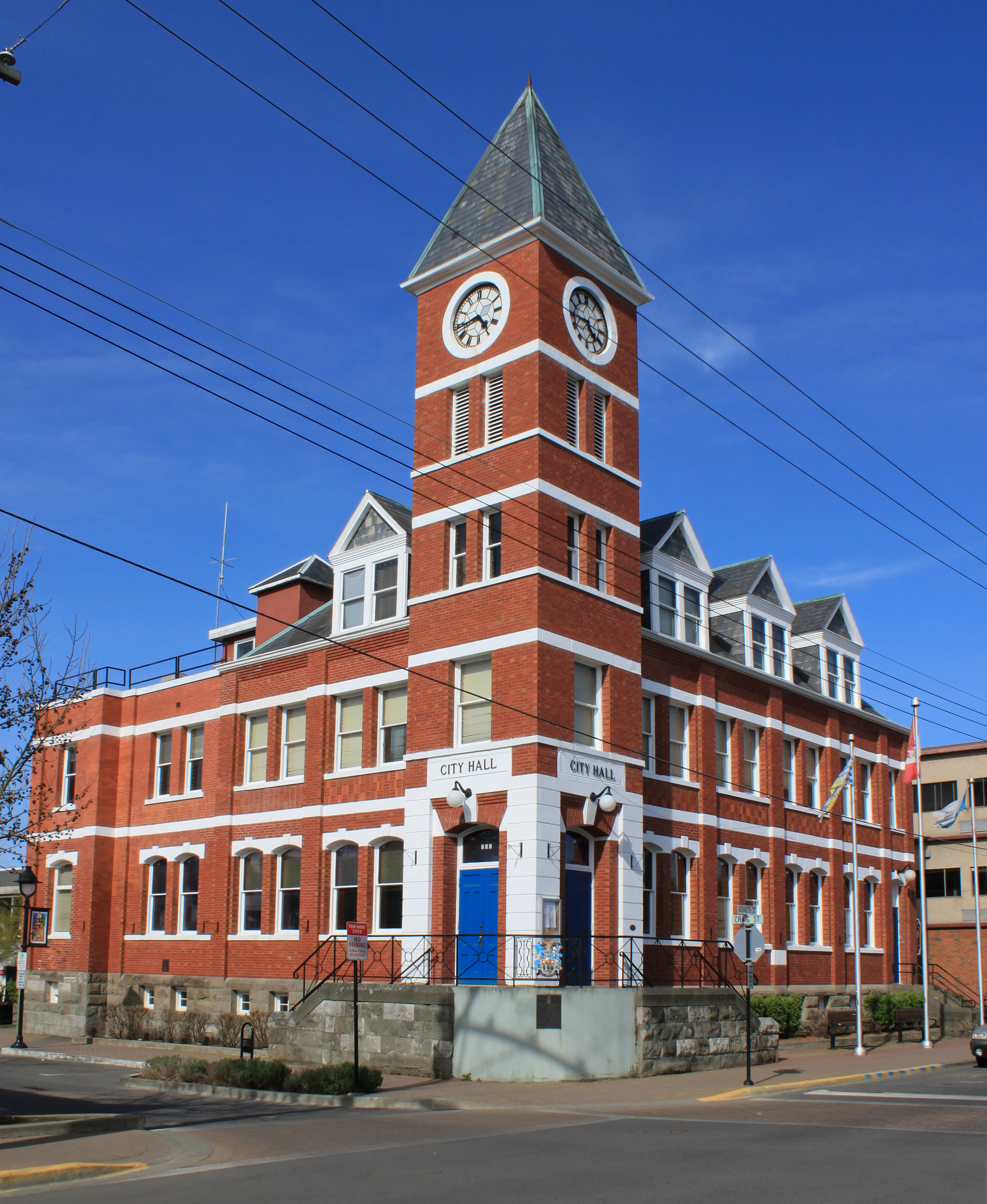
- Duncan City Hall
- Motto: City of Totems
- Location of Duncan in British Columbia Duncan (British Columbia)
- Coordinates: 48°46′43″N 123°42′29″W
- Country: Canada
- Province: British Columbia
- Region: Vancouver Island
- Regional district: Cowichan Valley
- Incorporated: 1912
- Named for: William Chalmers Duncan

Government
  - Body: Duncan City Council: Garry Bruce; Jenni Capps; Tom Duncan; Jessica Fetchko; Carol Newington; Bernice Timmer
  - Mayor: Mike McKinlay
  - MP: Jeff Kibble
  - MLA: Bert Chen

Area
  - City: 2.07 km^{2} (0.80 sq mi)
  - Urban: 373.71 km^{2} (144.29 sq mi)
- Elevation: 20 m (66 ft)

Population (2021)
  - City: 5,047
  - Density: 2,444.5/km^{2} (6,331/sq mi)
  - Urban: 23,278
  - Urban density: 1,070.5/km^{2} (2,773/sq mi)
  - Metro: 44,451
  - Metro density: 118.9/km^{2} (308/sq mi)
- Time zone: UTC−07:00 (PT)
- Forward sortation area: V9L
- Area codes: 250, 778, 236, 672
- Highways: Highway 1 (TCH)
- Waterways: Cowichan River
- Website: duncan.ca

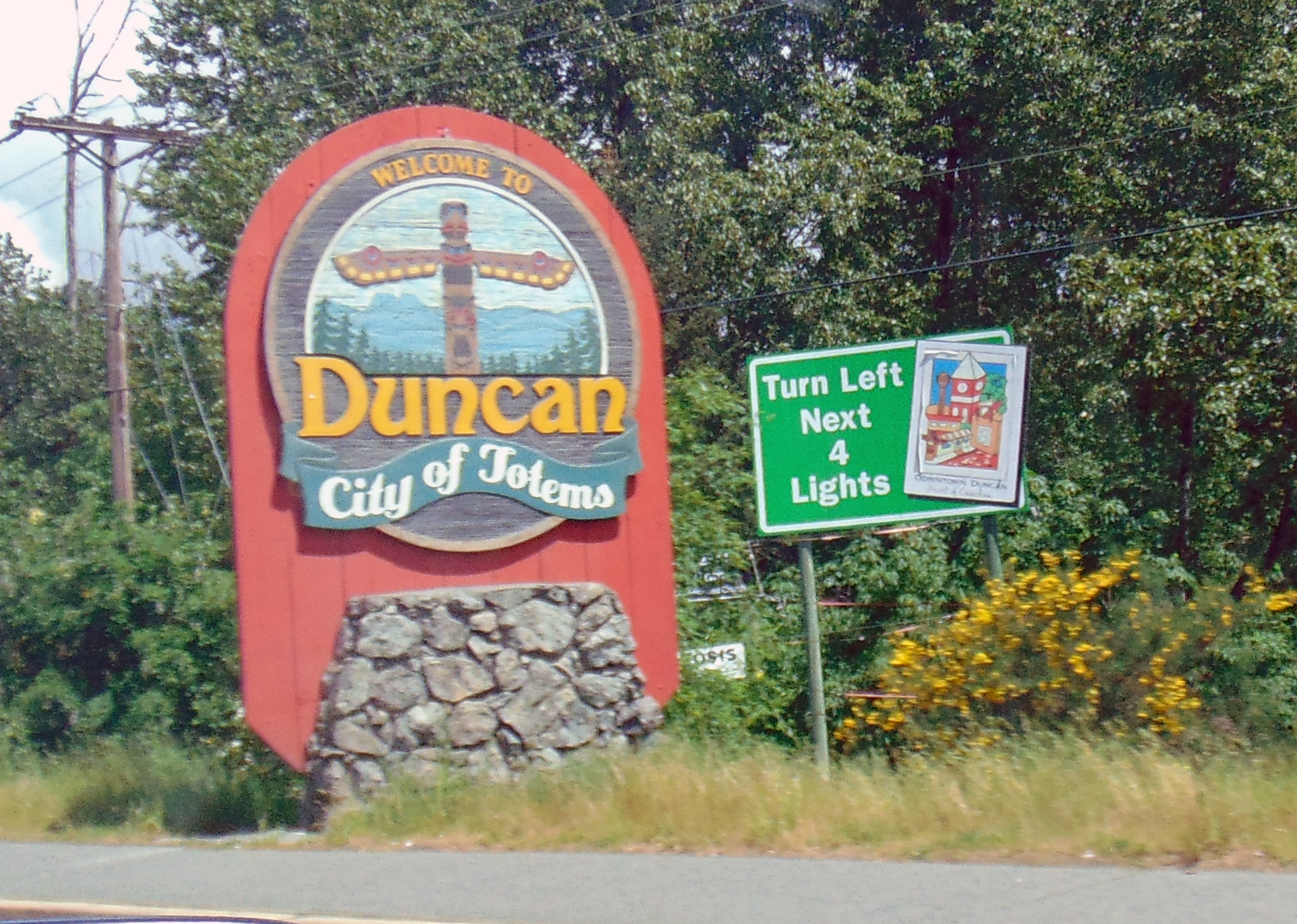
Sign welcoming visitors to the city of Duncan, on Vancouver Island, British Columbia

Duncan is a city on southern Vancouver Island in the Cowichan Valley Regional District, British Columbia, Canada. It is the smallest city in Canada by area. It was incorporated as a city in 1912.

== Location ==
The city is about 45 kilometres (28 mi) from both Victoria to the south and Nanaimo to the north.

Although the City of Duncan has a population of just over 5,000, it serves the Cowichan Valley which has a population of approximately 90,000, many of whom live in North Cowichan and Cowichan Tribes. This gives Duncan a much larger perceived "greater" population than that contained within the city limits. People in areas of North Cowichan and bordering on Duncan usually use "Duncan" as their mailing address.

Duncan has one seat on the Cowichan Valley Regional District Board. The name Cowichan is an Anglicization of Halkomelem Quw̓utsun̓, which means "the warm land".

== Transportation ==
The city is served by the Trans-Canada Highway which connects the city to Nanaimo in the north and Victoria to the south. Highway 1 through Duncan is a four-lane street with two signalized intersections (within the city limits) and a speed limit of 50 km/h. Duncan has a base maximum speed limit of 30 km/h.

British Columbia Highway 18 connects Duncan (via North Cowichan) to the town of Lake Cowichan to the west.

Public transit is provided in conjunction between BC Transit, the Cowichan Valley Regional Transit System and the Nanaimo Regional Transit System

Duncan is connected to the two largest communities on Vancouver Island, Nanaimo and Victoria, through regular bus service.

Public transit provides connections from Duncan to the surrounding communities including Lake Cowichan, Crofton, Chemainus, and Ladysmith as well as communities to the south including Cobble Hill, Shawnigan Lake and Mill Bay. Mill Bay service includes routing to the Malahat first nation and the Mill Bay to Brentwood Bay Ferry across the Saanich Inlet.

The Nanaimo Regional Transit System provides daily (except Sunday) bus service between Duncan and Nanaimo including a stop at the Nanaimo Airport.

The Island Rail Corridor railway line still passes through Duncan along the coast of Vancouver Island, but trains have long since stopped running on it. Both freight service and the Crown corporation VIA Rail passenger service have been suspended due to deferred maintenance on the rail line.

Duncan is serviced by the neighbouring Maple Bay Airport (YAQ) in North Cowichan, which offers services to Vancouver Downtown, Vancouver Airport, Ganges on Salt Spring Island and Bedwell Harbour on Pender Island. Service is provided by Saltspring Air and Harbour Air.

== History ==
The community is named after William Chalmers Duncan (born 1836 in Sarnia, Ontario). He arrived in Victoria in May 1862, then in August of that year he was one of the party of a 78 settlers which Governor Douglas took to Cowichan Bay. After going off on several gold rushes, Duncan settled close to the present City of Duncan. He married in 1876, and his son Kenneth became the first Mayor of Duncan. There is a Kenneth Street, as well as a Duncan Street, in the City.

Duncan's farm was named Alderlea, and this was the first name of the adjacent settlement. In August 1886, the Esquimalt and Nanaimo Railway was opened. No stop had been scheduled at Alderlea for the inaugural train bearing Sir John A. Macdonald and Robert Dunsmuir. However, at Duncan's Crossing, the level crossing nearest Alderlea, a crowd of 2,000 had assembled around a decorated arch and the train came to an unplanned halt. According to this legend, a train station was established at the settlement and the city built around it. Initially part of the District of North Cowichan, Duncan felt its needs as an urban settlement in the largely rural municipality were not being met, in particular the need to have proper roadways. After a particularly wet winter in 1911–1912, a vote was held to make Duncan a distinct city, and it was incorporated on 4 March 1912. With the enlargement of North Cowichan in the ensuing decades, there was an effort to re-unite the two municipalities, though a referendum on the matter in June 1978 was soundly defeated.

In the early 1900s, Duncan's Chinatown was the social centre for the Cowichan Valley's Chinese population. Chinatown was concentrated in a single block in the southwestern corner of Duncan. At its largest point, Duncan's Chinatown included six Chinese families and 30 merchants who supplied goods and services to the loggers, millworkers, cannery and mine workers in the area. The city tore the buildings down in 1969 to build a new law courts complex. Some materials from the original buildings were used at Whippletree Junction.

In the 1980s, the city was noted in coverage related to the 1985 bombings at Narita Airport in Japan and aboard Air India Flight 182, Canada's largest murder case. Resident Inderjit Singh Reyat purchased bomb parts and a radio at Duncan stores, and used the radio to conceal the bomb. Less than two weeks prior to the bombings, Reyat and suspected Air India mastermind Talwinder Singh Parmar were observed testing explosives in the woods outside of Duncan by the Canadian Security Intelligence Service (CSIS).

== Demographics ==
In the 2021 Census of Population conducted by Statistics Canada, Duncan had a population of 5,047 living in 2,454 of its 2,620 total private dwellings, a change of 2.1% from its 2016 population of 4,944. With a land area of 2.06 km^{2} (0.80 sq mi), it had a population density of 2,450.0/km^{2} (6,345.5/sq mi) in 2021.

=== Ethnicity ===
Panethnic groups in the City of Duncan (1986−2021)
Panethnic group	2021		2016		2011		2006		2001		1996		1991		1986	
Panethnic group	Pop.	%	Pop.	%	Pop.	%	Pop.	%	Pop.	%	Pop.	%	Pop.	%	Pop.	%
European (Note: Statistic includes all persons that did not make up part of a visible minority or an indigenous identity.)	3,625	78.04%	3,605	80.65%	3,740	83.86%	4,155	85.06%	3,530	79.5%	3,810	86%	3,620	89.27%	3,380	87.23%
Indigenous	760	16.36%	630	14.09%	485	10.87%	525	10.75%	735	16.55%	395	8.92%	200	4.93%	300	7.74%
Southeast Asian (Note: Statistic includes total responses of "Filipino" and "Southeast Asian" under visible minority section on census.)	60	1.29%	35	0.78%	105	2.35%	60	1.23%	0	0%	0	0%	30	0.74%	15	0.39%
African	55	1.18%	60	1.34%	0	0%	20	0.41%	20	0.45%	15	0.34%	0	0%	0	0%
South Asian	40	0.86%	65	1.45%	40	0.9%	35	0.72%	50	1.13%	75	1.69%	160	3.95%	105	2.71%
East Asian (Note: Statistic includes total responses of "Chinese", "Korean", and "Japanese" under visible minority section on census.)	30	0.65%	40	0.89%	70	1.57%	80	1.64%	90	2.03%	115	2.6%	45	1.11%	70	1.81%
Latin American	20	0.43%	15	0.34%	0	0%	10	0.2%	0	0%	0	0%	0	0%	0	0%
Middle Eastern (Note: Statistic includes total responses of "West Asian" and "Arab" under visible minority section on census.)	10	0.22%	0	0%	0	0%	0	0%	0	0%	20	0.45%	0	0%	5	0.13%
Other/multiracial (Note: Statistic includes total responses of "Visible minority, n.i.e." and "Multiple visible minorities" under visible minority section on census.)	25	0.54%	25	0.56%	0	0%	0	0%	20	0.45%	0	0%	—N/a	—N/a	—N/a	—N/a
Total responses	4,645	92.03%	4,470	90.41%	4,460	90.43%	4,885	97.97%	4,440	94.49%	4,430	96.56%	4,055	94.28%	3,875	95.94%
Total population	5,047	100%	4,944	100%	4,932	100%	4,986	100%	4,699	100%	4,588	100%	4,301	100%	4,039	100%
Note: Totals greater than 100% due to multiple origin responses.

=== Religion ===
According to the 2021 census, religious groups in Duncan included:

- Irreligion (2,780 persons or 59.8%)
- Christianity (1,590 persons or 34.2%)
- Indigenous Spirituality (45 persons or 1.0%)
- Sikhism (30 persons or 0.6%)
- Judaism (25 persons or 0.5%)
- Buddhism (20 persons or 0.4%)
- Islam (15 persons or 0.3%)
- Other (140 persons or 3.0%)

Religious groups in Duncan (1991−2021)
Religious group	2021		2011		2001		1991	
Religious group	Pop.	%	Pop.	%	Pop.	%	Pop.	%
Christian	1,590	34.23%	2,200	49.33%	2,515	56.64%	2,730	67.32%
Indigenous spirituality	45	0.97%	0	0%	N/A	N/A	N/A	N/A
Sikh	30	0.65%	25	0.56%	60	1.35%	130	3.21%
Jewish	25	0.54%	0	0%	10	0.23%	0	0%
Buddhist	20	0.43%	30	0.67%	50	1.13%	0	0%
Muslim	15	0.32%	0	0%	0	0%	0	0%
Hindu	0	0%	0	0%	0	0%	0	0%
Other religion	140	3.01%	90	2.02%	40	0.9%	0	0%
Irreligious	2,780	59.85%	2,100	47.09%	1,760	39.64%	1,185	29.22%
Total responses	4,645	92.03%	4,460	90.43%	4,440	94.49%	4,055	94.28%

== Attractions ==
The City of Duncan was incorporated in 1912 and is known for one of the largest totem pole collections. The City was officially named "City of Totems" in 1985. The City had 44 totem poles in the collection, however one was destroyed in an auto accident, one was gifted to Kaikohe, New Zealand and one returned to earth. In 2007, the City of Duncan deemed copyright privileges of the totem poles. The use of the totems' images for commercial purposes requires the City of Duncan's approval. The Cowichan Historical Society (Museum) provides free totem tours in the summer months.

Duncan has a large Indigenous community and is the traditional home of the Cowichan Tribes, who are the largest band among the Coast Salish people. The Coast Salish men and women of the Cowichan Tribes are makers of Cowichan Sweaters.

Before the Canada–United States softwood lumber dispute, Duncan and the whole Cowichan Valley were a thriving lumber centre in British Columbia.

Cowichan Community Centre is located in the jurisdiction of the Municipality of North Cowichan, and serves purpose for all citizens in the Cowichan Valley Regional District (CVRD), including swimming and skating facilities. The centre displayed the World's Largest Hockey Stick, which was made specifically for Expo 86 in Vancouver, and purchased by CVRD at the end of the event, until it was removed in 2024 due to the decayed structure.

== Arts and culture ==
The Cowichan Performing Arts Centre is part of the Cowichan Community Centre and hosts classical music performances presented by the Cowichan Symphony Society, including performances by Victoria Symphony and the Vancouver Island Symphony.

== Climate ==
According to the Köppen climate classification, Duncan has a warm-summer Mediterranean climate (Köppen Csb). The sheltered nature of the Cowichan Valley allows more summer warmth than most other Vancouver Island locations, but the valley is also somewhat of a frost pocket with relatively short frost free periods.

Climate data for Duncan Forestry; 6 m (20 ft) asl (1971–2000 normals)
Month	Jan	Feb	Mar	Apr	May	Jun	Jul	Aug	Sep	Oct	Nov	Dec	Year
Record high °C (°F)	15.0 (59.0)	19.4 (66.9)	21.1 (70.0)	25.6 (78.1)	33.5 (92.3)	41.5 (106.7)	38.2 (100.8)	37.5 (99.5)	34.5 (94.1)	28.4 (83.1)	18.9 (66.0)	17.0 (62.6)	41.5 (106.7)
Mean daily maximum °C (°F)	6.1 (43.0)	8.0 (46.4)	10.6 (51.1)	13.9 (57.0)	17.4 (63.3)	20.3 (68.5)	23.3 (73.9)	23.6 (74.5)	20.3 (68.5)	14.8 (58.6)	8.8 (47.8)	6.3 (43.3)	14.5 (58.1)
Daily mean °C (°F)	2.6 (36.7)	4.1 (39.4)	5.9 (42.6)	8.5 (47.3)	11.9 (53.4)	14.7 (58.5)	17.0 (62.6)	17.1 (62.8)	13.8 (56.8)	9.3 (48.7)	5.0 (41.0)	2.9 (37.2)	9.4 (48.9)
Mean daily minimum °C (°F)	−1.1 (30.0)	0.1 (32.2)	1.2 (34.2)	3.0 (37.4)	6.2 (43.2)	9.1 (48.4)	10.7 (51.3)	10.5 (50.9)	7.2 (45.0)	3.8 (38.8)	1.2 (34.2)	−0.5 (31.1)	4.3 (39.7)
Record low °C (°F)	−21.1 (−6.0)	−15.5 (4.1)	−12.0 (10.4)	−3.9 (25.0)	−2.2 (28.0)	1.7 (35.1)	3.3 (37.9)	2.2 (36.0)	−3.0 (26.6)	−6.7 (19.9)	−17.0 (1.4)	−21.7 (−7.1)	−21.7 (−7.1)
Average precipitation mm (inches)	145.3 (5.72)	130.1 (5.12)	101.7 (4.00)	54.0 (2.13)	44.4 (1.75)	37.3 (1.47)	20.3 (0.80)	25.3 (1.00)	46.7 (1.84)	80.0 (3.15)	168.8 (6.65)	185.5 (7.30)	1,039.2 (40.91)
Average rainfall mm (inches)	129.5 (5.10)	122.2 (4.81)	99.7 (3.93)	53.9 (2.12)	44.4 (1.75)	37.3 (1.47)	20.3 (0.80)	25.3 (1.00)	46.7 (1.84)	79.5 (3.13)	163.3 (6.43)	171.1 (6.74)	993.1 (39.10)
Average snowfall cm (inches)	15.8 (6.2)	7.9 (3.1)	2.0 (0.8)	0.2 (0.1)	0.0 (0.0)	0.0 (0.0)	0.0 (0.0)	0.0 (0.0)	0.0 (0.0)	0.4 (0.2)	5.4 (2.1)	14.4 (5.7)	46.1 (18.1)
Source: Environment Canada

Climate data for Duncan Kelvin Creek; 103 m (338 ft) asl (1971–2000 normals)
Month	Jan	Feb	Mar	Apr	May	Jun	Jul	Aug	Sep	Oct	Nov	Dec	Year
Record high °C (°F)	16.5 (61.7)	18.5 (65.3)	23.5 (74.3)	28.5 (83.3)	32.0 (89.6)	34.0 (93.2)	36.0 (96.8)	34.5 (94.1)	35.0 (95.0)	27.0 (80.6)	18.0 (64.4)	17.5 (63.5)	36.0 (96.8)
Mean daily maximum °C (°F)	6.8 (44.2)	8.7 (47.7)	11.2 (52.2)	14.8 (58.6)	18.4 (65.1)	21.3 (70.3)	24.7 (76.5)	24.6 (76.3)	22.1 (71.8)	15.1 (59.2)	9.5 (49.1)	6.2 (43.2)	15.3 (59.5)
Daily mean °C (°F)	3.6 (38.5)	4.4 (39.9)	6.3 (43.3)	9.1 (48.4)	12.4 (54.3)	15.3 (59.5)	17.9 (64.2)	17.8 (64.0)	15.2 (59.4)	10.1 (50.2)	5.8 (42.4)	3.3 (37.9)	10.1 (50.2)
Mean daily minimum °C (°F)	0.3 (32.5)	0.0 (32.0)	1.4 (34.5)	3.4 (38.1)	6.3 (43.3)	9.1 (48.4)	11.1 (52.0)	11.0 (51.8)	8.1 (46.6)	5.1 (41.2)	2.1 (35.8)	−0.4 (31.3)	4.8 (40.6)
Record low °C (°F)	−21.1 (−6.0)	−15.5 (4.1)	−12.0 (10.4)	−3.9 (25.0)	−2.2 (28.0)	1.7 (35.1)	3.3 (37.9)	2.2 (36.0)	−3.0 (26.6)	−6.7 (19.9)	−17.0 (1.4)	−21.7 (−7.1)	−21.7 (−7.1)
Average precipitation mm (inches)	248.3 (9.78)	139.1 (5.48)	135.4 (5.33)	82.6 (3.25)	49.1 (1.93)	36.7 (1.44)	22.3 (0.88)	33.2 (1.31)	31.6 (1.24)	119.4 (4.70)	227.9 (8.97)	235.6 (9.28)	1,361.2 (53.59)
Average rainfall mm (inches)	225.2 (8.87)	125.9 (4.96)	125.9 (4.96)	82.6 (3.25)	49.1 (1.93)	36.7 (1.44)	22.3 (0.88)	33.2 (1.31)	31.6 (1.24)	119.1 (4.69)	219.7 (8.65)	218.0 (8.58)	1,289.2 (50.76)
Average snowfall cm (inches)	23.0 (9.1)	13.2 (5.2)	9.6 (3.8)	0.1 (0.0)	0.0 (0.0)	0.0 (0.0)	0.0 (0.0)	0.0 (0.0)	0.0 (0.0)	0.4 (0.2)	8.3 (3.3)	17.6 (6.9)	72.0 (28.3)
Source: Environment Canada

== Education ==
Duncan is part of British Columbia's School District 79 Cowichan Valley. It has one independent school. Queen Margaret's School, established in 1921 as a private secondary university preparatory school.

Vancouver Island University (formerly Malaspina University-College) has a regional campus in the Municipality of North Cowichan, bordering Duncan, that offers a Bachelor of Education degree as well as programs and courses in university transfer, access, trades and applied technology, health and human services, and career and academic preparation. The campus also has a Continuing Education department that offers certificate programs, personal and professional development courses, and online courses. The current 55,000-square-foot (5,100 m^{2}) campus opened for classes in June 2011.

Also bordering Duncan in the Municipality of North Cowichan, there are two public secondary schools, Quw'utsun Secondary School, Quamichan School, and the former Cowichan Secondary School, as well as several elementary schools. The head offices of School District 79 Cowichan Valley are also located in North Cowichan. In the Cowichan region there are also has two denominational independent schools: Queen of Angels (Catholic school), serving preschool to Grade 9 students, and Duncan Christian School, whose campus is home to both an independent elementary and high school. Sunrise Waldorf School is a non-denominational K-8 independent school offering Waldorf education in the Cowichan Valley.

== Sports ==
The Cowichan Community Centre is located on James St. in North Cowichan, and is the home of the British Columbia Hockey League's Cowichan Valley Capitals, who play in the Cowichan Community Centre. It is home to a number of other sports and athletics organizations.

== Notable people ==
See also Category:People from Duncan, British Columbia

- Greg Adams, former NHL player
- George Barton, rugby union player
- Robin Bawa, former NHL player
- Michael Bigg, marine biologist
- Doug Bodger, former NHL player
- Dylan Coghlan, NHL player
- Geoff Courtnall, former NHL player
- Russ Courtnall, former NHL player
- Mac DeMarco, solo musician and songwriter
- Matt Ellison, former NHL player
- Charles Ferguson Hoey, Victoria Cross recipient
- Moe Sihota, former politician
- Mike Sweeney, former soccer player (played for Canada at the 1986 World Cup)
- David H. Turpin, former president of the University of Alberta
- Jonathan Whitesell, Canadian actor
- Al Wilson, former CFL player

== Gallery ==
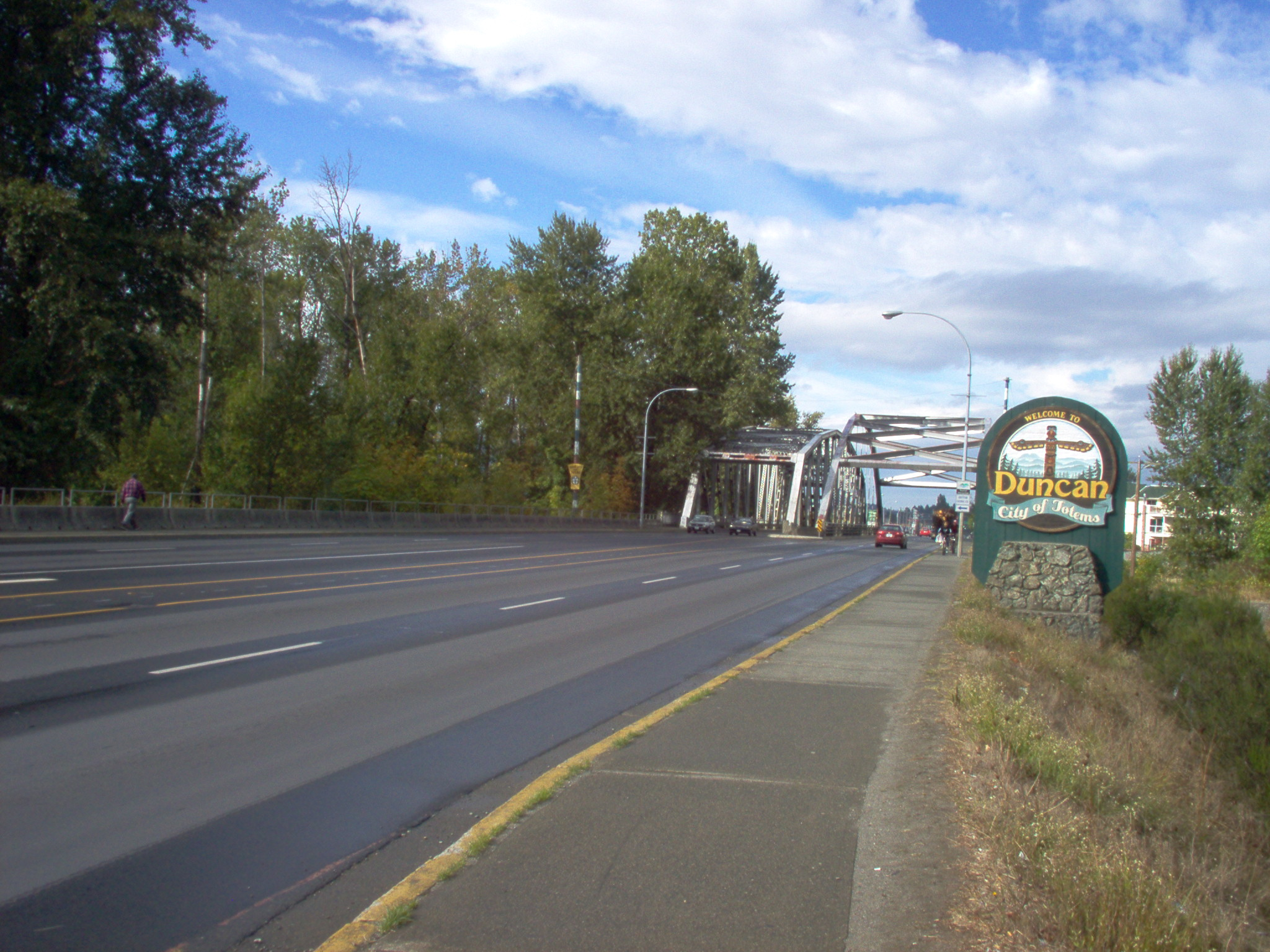
Silver Bridge

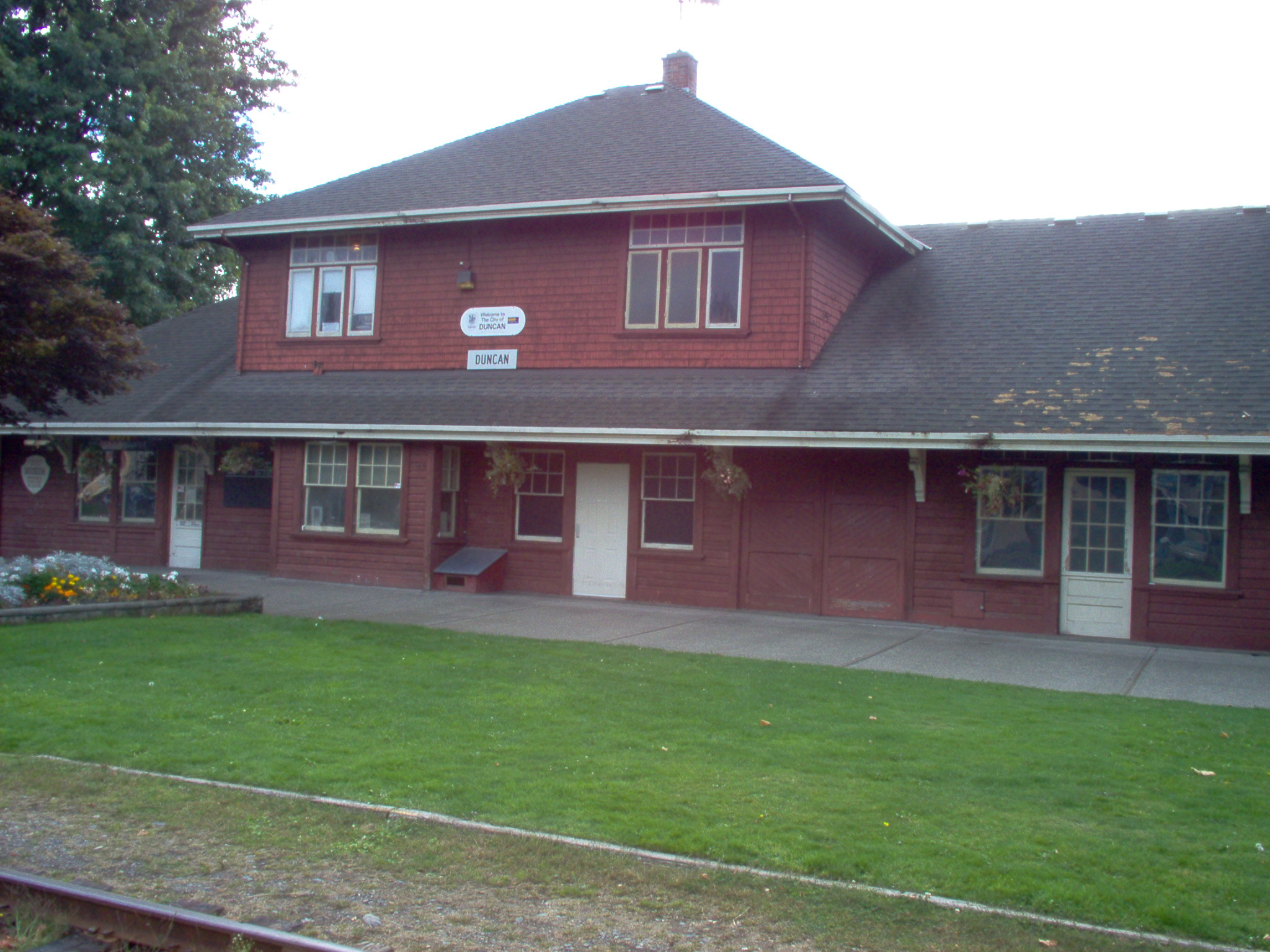
The Train Station

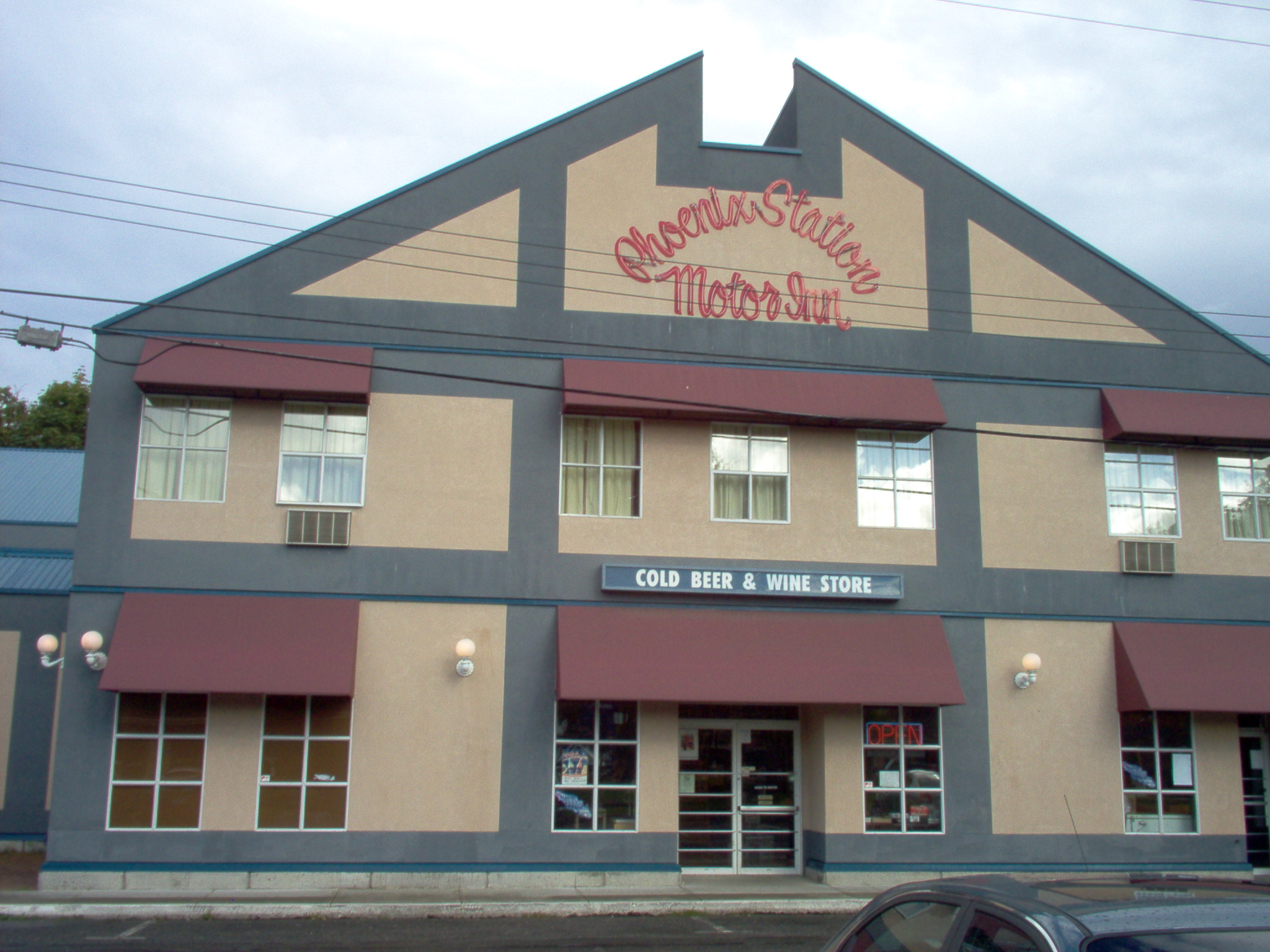
The Phoenix Motor Inn

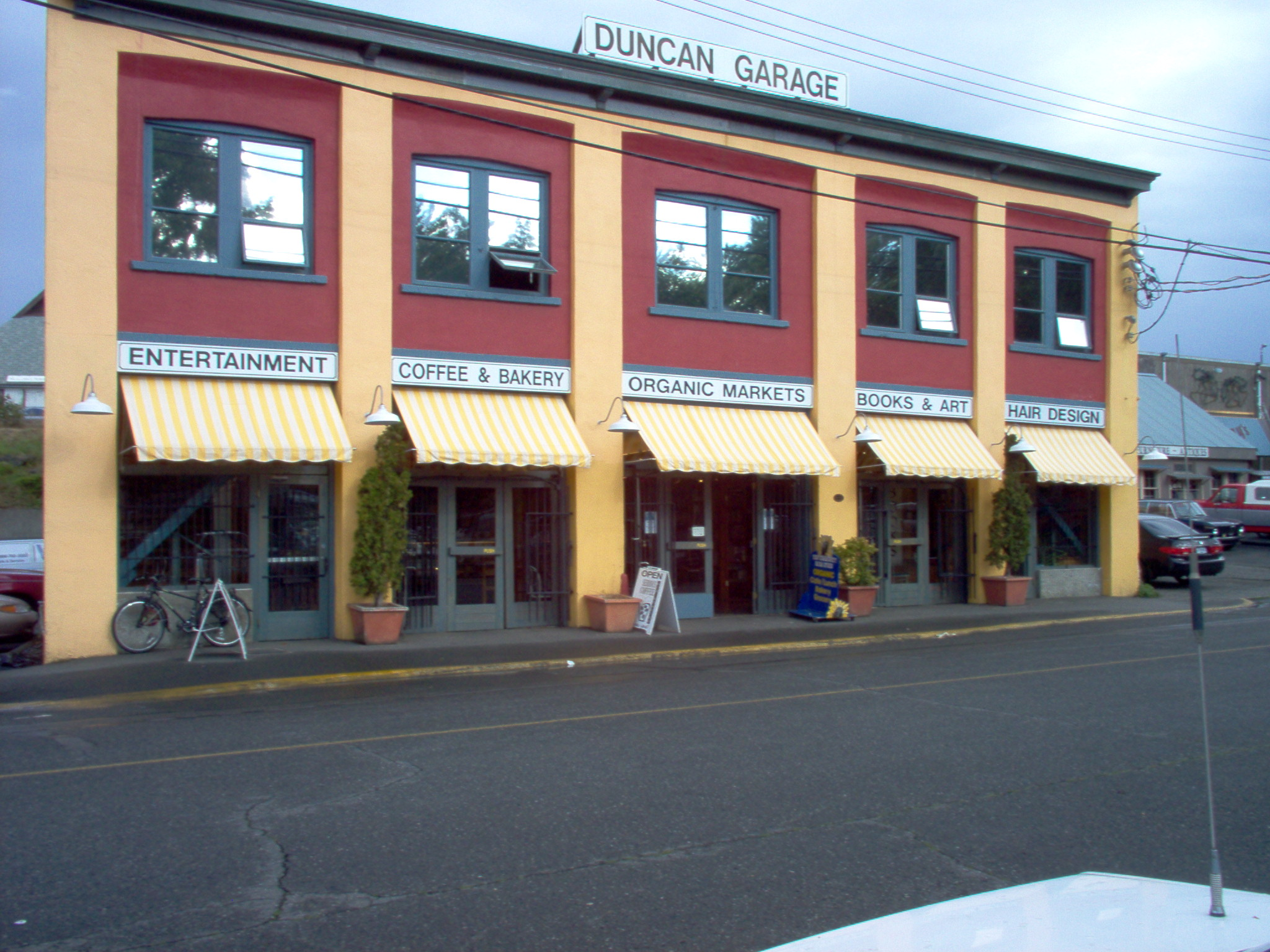
Duncan Garage

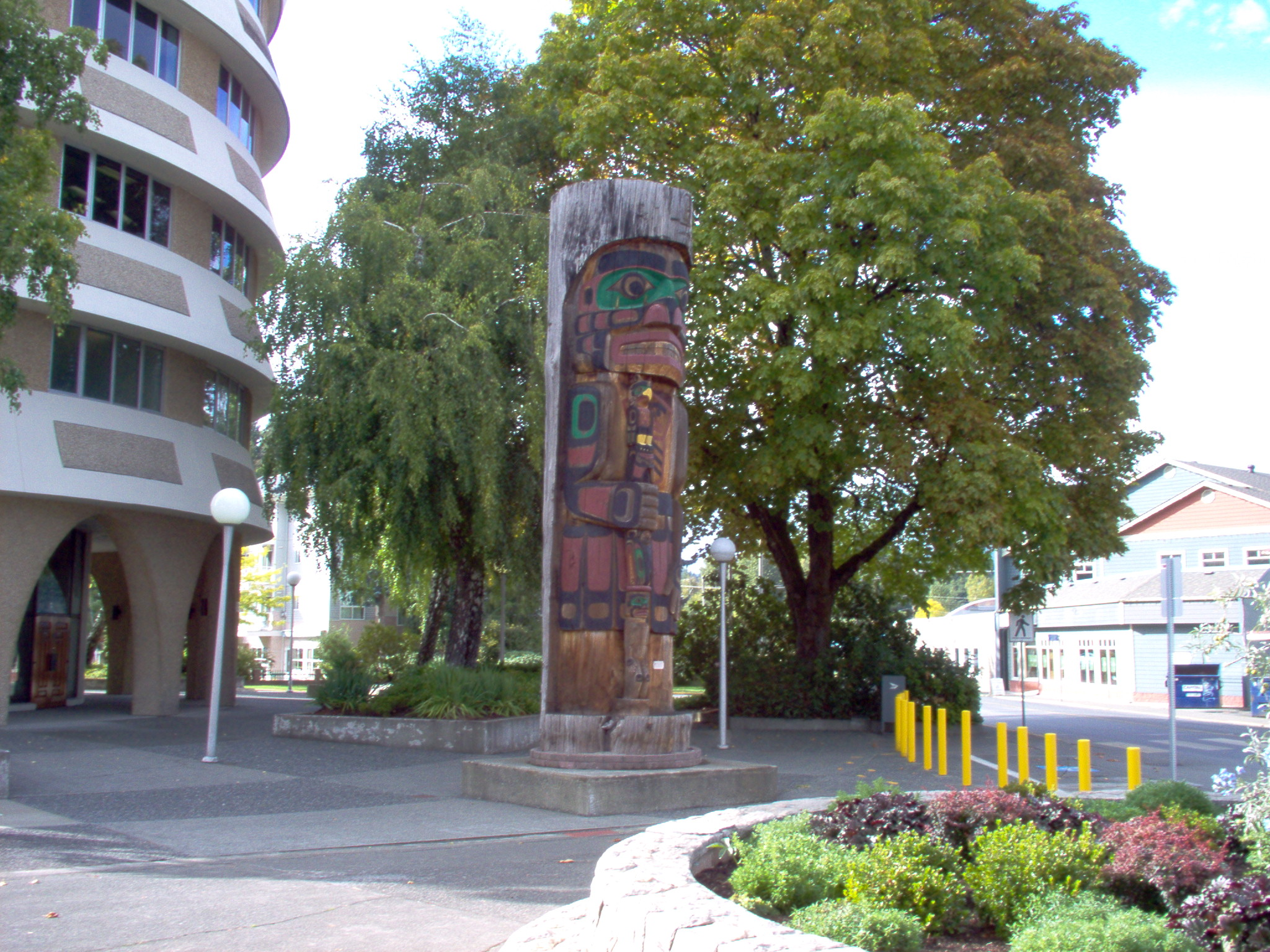
Totem Pole

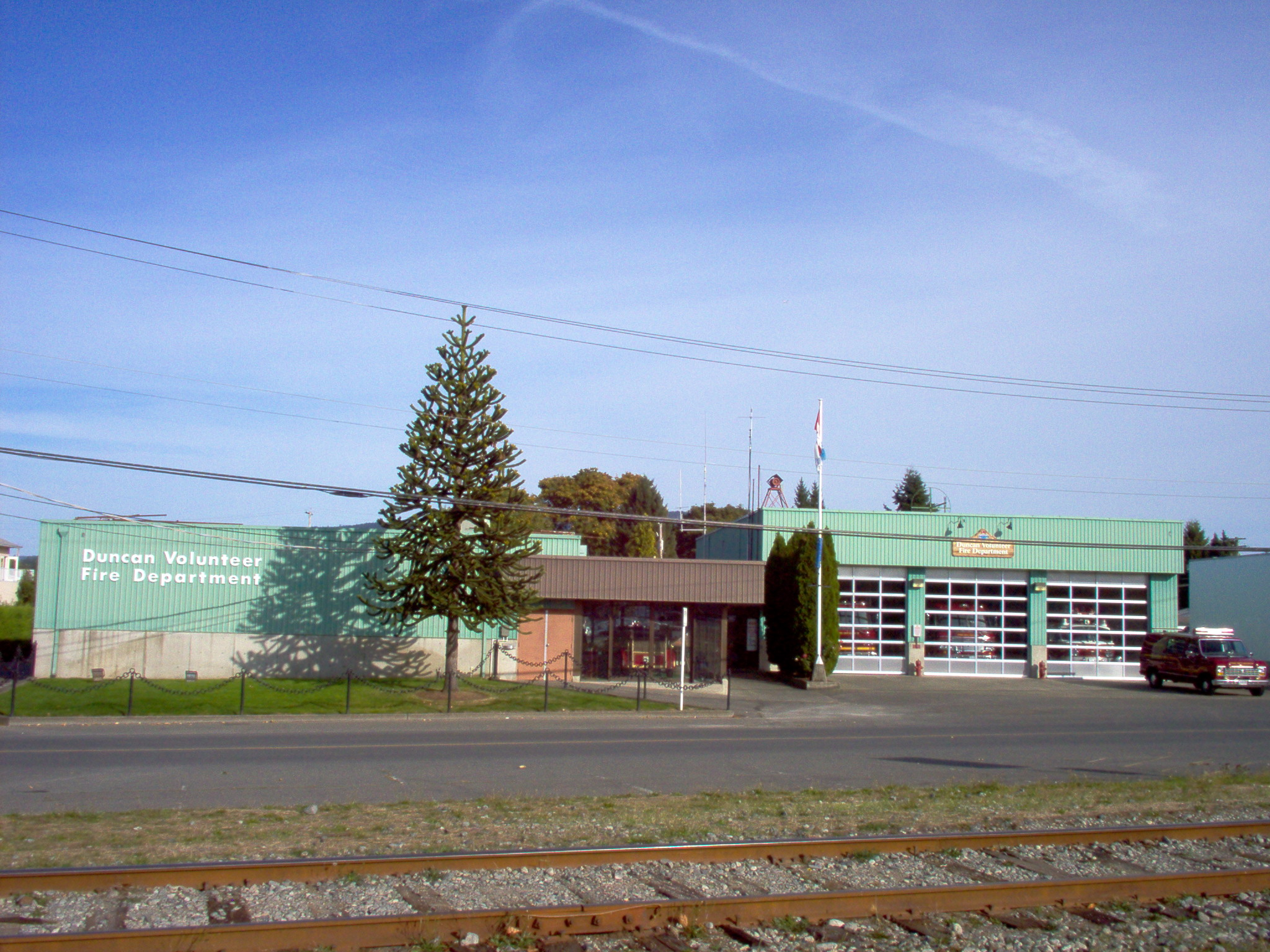
Fire Hall

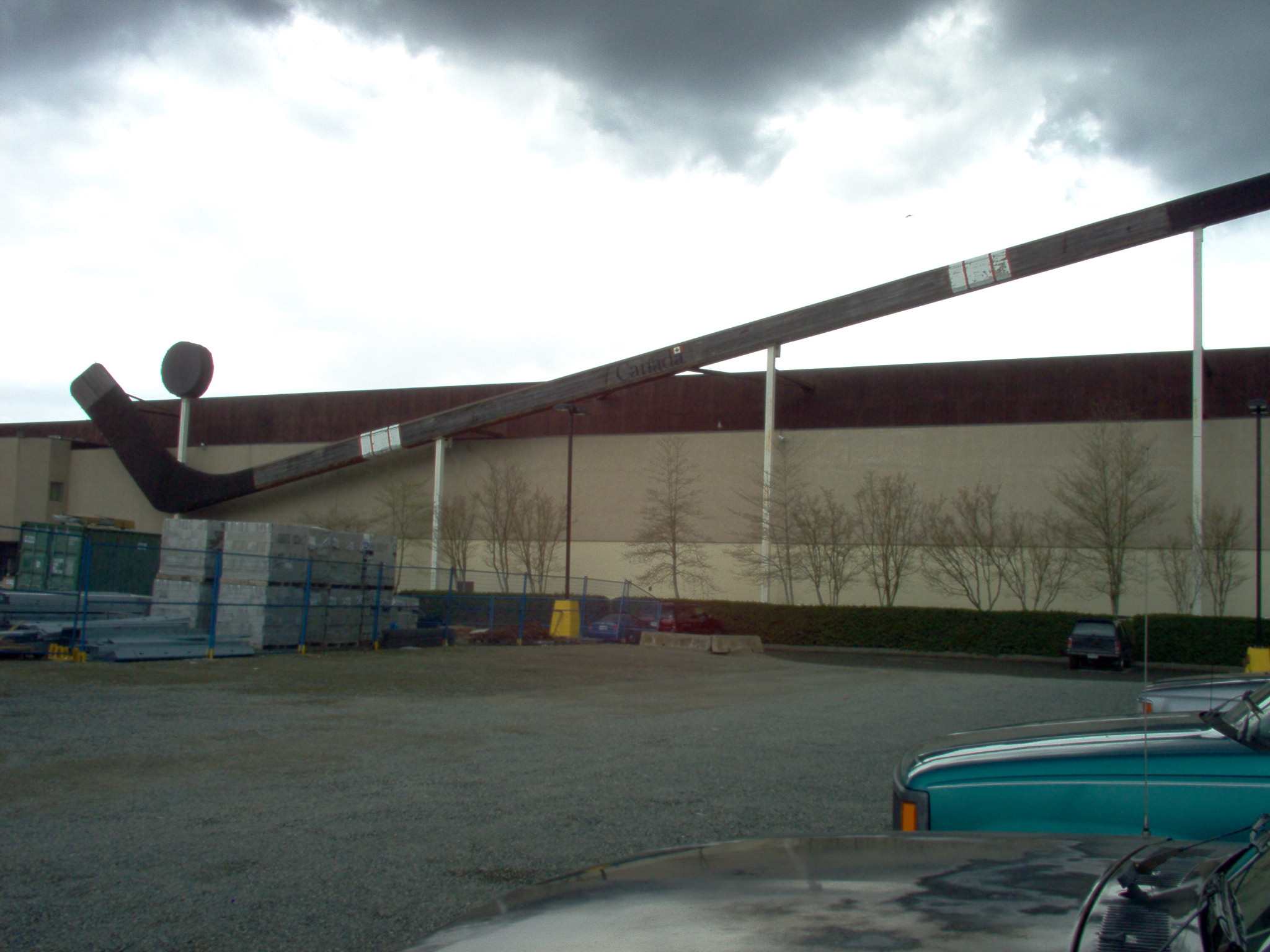
The World's Largest Hockey Stick at Cowichan Community Centre in 2008

== See also ==
- Paldi, British Columbia
- St. Clare's Monastery
