= Northcentral University =

Part of National University System

Coordinates: 33.64123°N 111.8931°W

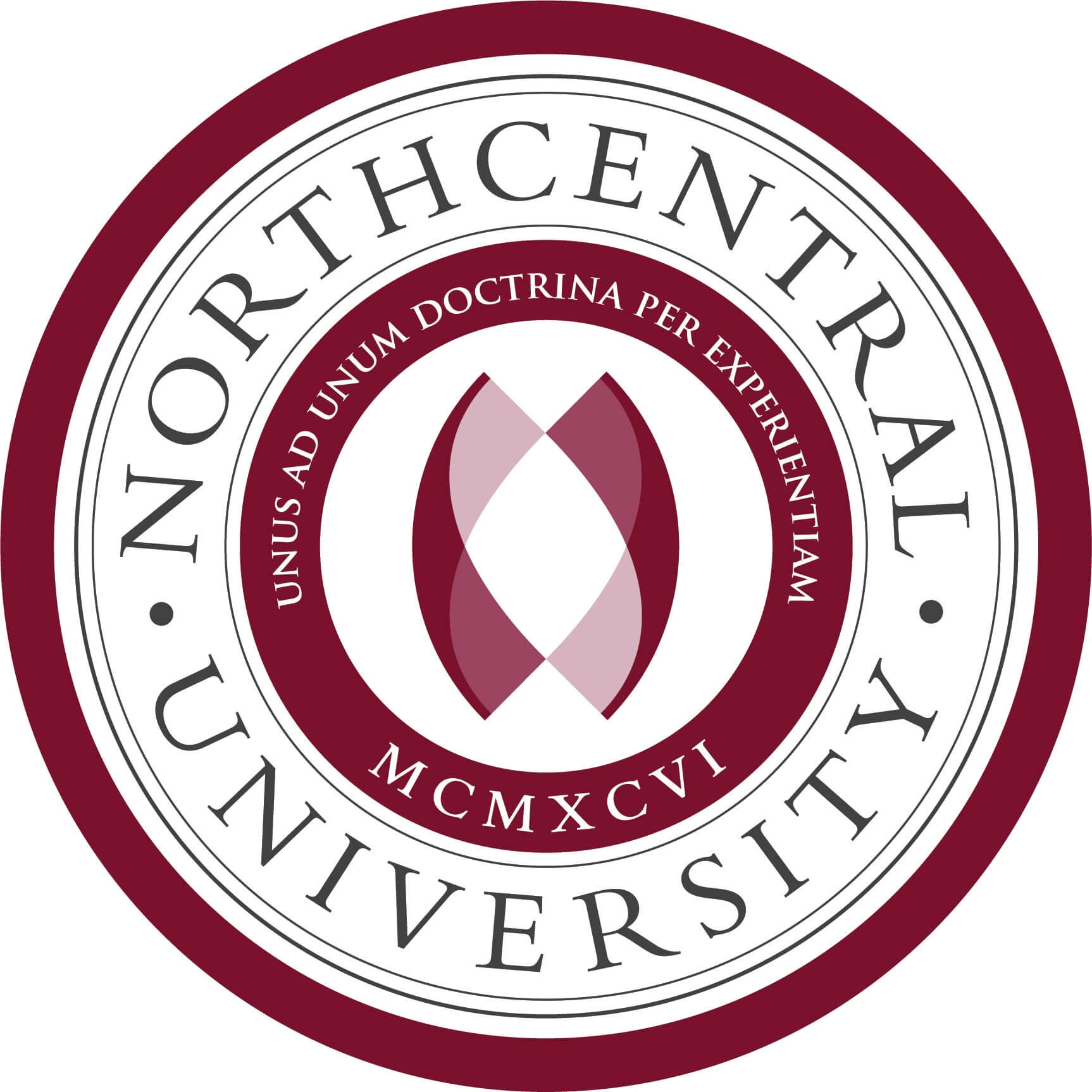
- Motto: Unus Ad Unum Doctrina Per Experientiam
- Motto in English: One-to-One Education By Experience
- Type: Private online university
- Active: 1996–2022
- Parent institution: National University System
- Location: (Administrative & Legal) San Diego, CA / (Service Center) Scottsdale, Arizona, United States
- Colors: Burgundy & Gold
- Mascot: Roadrunner
- Website: www.ncu.edu

Northcentral University was a private online university with its headquarters in San Diego, California. It was established in 1996 and is classified among "D/PU: Doctoral/Professional Universities"; it offers bachelor's, master's, specialist, and doctoral degrees. NCU was acquired by the National University System in 2019.

In 2022 Northcentral University merged into National University, with Northcentral academic programs continuing as National programs.

== History ==
Northcentral University was founded in 1996 by Donald Hecht as a private for-profit university.

In 2003 the university received regional accreditation from the Higher Learning Commission. The institutions headquarters was founded in Prescott, Arizona and was moved to Scottsdale, Arizona and eventually La Jolla, California. In that same year, the school received ACBSP accreditation. Shortly thereafter, on October 8, 2008, Northcentral announced the university was being purchased by Rockbridge Growth Equity, LLC.

In 2011 the US Department of Education determined Northcentral was one of 75 US institutions failing its 2009–2010 financial responsibility test (a measure of the institution's financial solvency). It would be required to post a letter of credit in order for students to receive federal financial aid. Northcentral also failed its 2010–2011, 2011–2012 and 2012–2013 financial responsibility tests, scoring zero for 2010–2011 on a scale of −1 to 3, lower than the 0.2 it earned the prior term; 0.2 for 2011–2012; and 0.2 again for 2012–2013. In 2015 the US Department of Education placed Northcentral on "HCM-Cash Monitoring 1" status because of its financial issues.

In 2019, the National University System (California) acquired Northcentral University, in effect converting Northcentral University into a non-profit institution.

== Academics ==
Northcentral University consisted of six schools:

- School of Law (Degrees offered: JD, BA, Undergraduate Certificate in Paralegal Studies)
- School of Business (Degrees offered: BBA, MBA, MSOL, MSA, DPA, DBA, PhD; Post-Baccalaureate and Post-Master's certifications in Business)
- School of Technology (Degrees offered: MS and PhD)
- School of Education (Degrees offered: MAT, MEd, MS-ID, EdS, EdD, EdD-ID, PhD, PhD-ID; Post-Baccalaureate and Post-Master's certifications in Education)
- School of Health Sciences (Degrees offered: MHA, DHA, MSN, DNP)
- School of Social and Behavioral Sciences (Department of Psychology – Degrees offered: BA, MA, MS and PhD in psychology; Post-Baccalaureate and Post-Master's certifications. Department of Marriage and Family Sciences – Degrees offered: MA, DMFT and PhD in Marriage and Family Therapy; Post-Baccalaureate and Post-Master's certifications

=== Accreditation and certifications ===
Northcentral was accredited by the Western Association of Schools and Colleges; the institution was previously accredited by the Higher Learning Commission. The university's business school was accredited by the Accreditation Council for Business Schools and Programs (ACBSP). The university's master's and PhD programs in Marriage & Family Therapy were accredited by the American Association for Marriage and Family Therapy and Commission on Accreditation for Marriage and Family Therapy Education COAMFTE.

Northcentral University was also recognized as a Registered Education Provider (REP) at the Global Provider Enrollment Level by Project Management Institute. It offered project management degrees at the bachelor, master, and doctoral levels.

The JFK School of Law at NCU was placed on probation by the State Bar of California, through its Committee of Bar Examiners, due to reporting a five-year cumulative bar exam pass rate (MPR) of 39.7 percent for 2020, when a minimum of 40 percent is required under Rule 4.160(N); the law school raised its MPR to 41.9 on July 1, 2021, and its probation was lifted.
