= Cowichan Community Centre =

Community centre in British Columbia, Canada

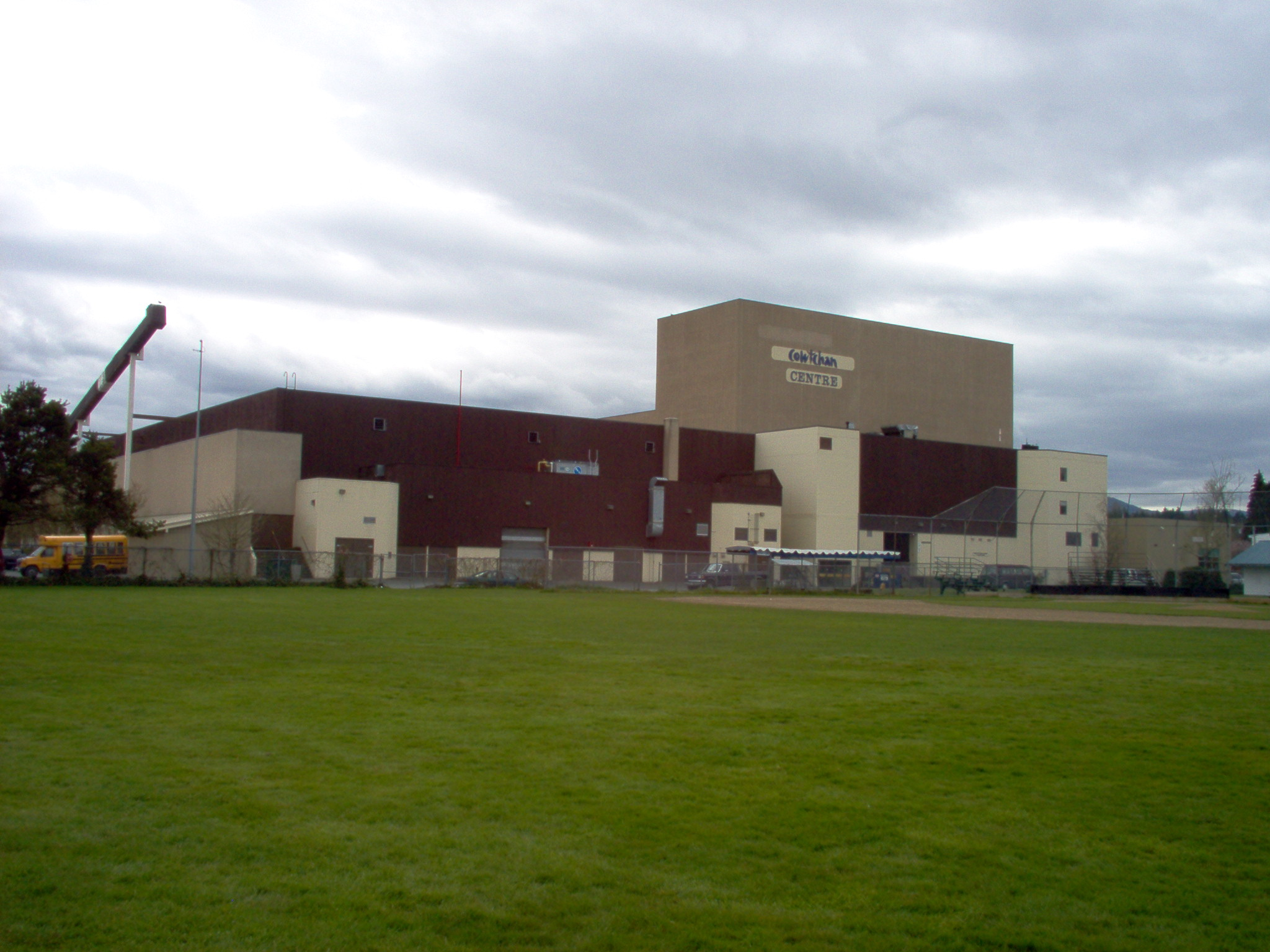
- Cowichan Community Centre
- Interactive map of Cowichan Community Centre
- Former names: Cowichan Community Centre (1978–2008), Island Savings Centre (2008–2019)
- Location: 2687 James Street; North Cowichan, British Columbia; V9L 2X5
- Coordinates: 48.78278°N 123.70313°W
- Owner: Municipality of North Cowichan
- Operator: Cowichan Valley Regional District
- Capacity: Ice hockey: 2,040; Concert: 731

Construction
- Groundbreaking: July 13, 1978
- Opened: December 9, 1978

Tenants
- Cowichan Valley Capitals (BCHL) (1980–1984, 1988–1990, 1993–Present); Duncan Dynamics Gymnastics (BCGS) (2000–Present)

The Cowichan Community Centre (formerly known as Island Savings Centre) is a facility serving Cowichan Valley, British Columbia. It has a pool, theatre, arena, and gymnasium. It was built in 1978, on the former site of the Cowichan Curling Rink. Island Savings, "Vancouver Island's Credit Union", donated $1 Million CDN to the centre in exchange for a 10-year naming rights deal. In 2019, the name reverted to "Cowichan Community Centre".

== Cowichan Performing Arts Centre ==
Since 1978, the Cowichan Performing Arts Centre (formerly known as the Cowichan Theatre) has been the premiere entertainment venue in Cowichan welcoming thousands of visitors, patrons, performers and artists to its 731-seat proscenium-arch theatre. The Cowichan Performing Arts Centre serves the Cowichan region as a community theatre for local groups, as a roadhouse for touring professional artists, and as a conference and convention facility. It hosts performances sponsored by the Cowichan Symphony Society.

The Cowichan Performing Arts Centre is a function of the Arts & Culture Division of the Cowichan Valley Regional District's Recreation & Culture Department, with funding coming from throughout the Cowichan Region, from the Malahat to Ladysmith.

== Cowichan Aquatic Centre ==
The Cowichan Aquatic Centre is the new swimming pool facility located adjacent to the Cowichan Community Centre, in the Municipality of North Cowichan and near the City of Duncan, completed for the 2008 North American Indigenous Games. Standing on the platform in front of the Aquatic Centre, by the Totem Pole, is the perfect viewing spot to photograph the place where World's Largest Hockey Stick used to be.

== Cowichan Valley Arena ==
Cowichan Community Centre
- The Stick
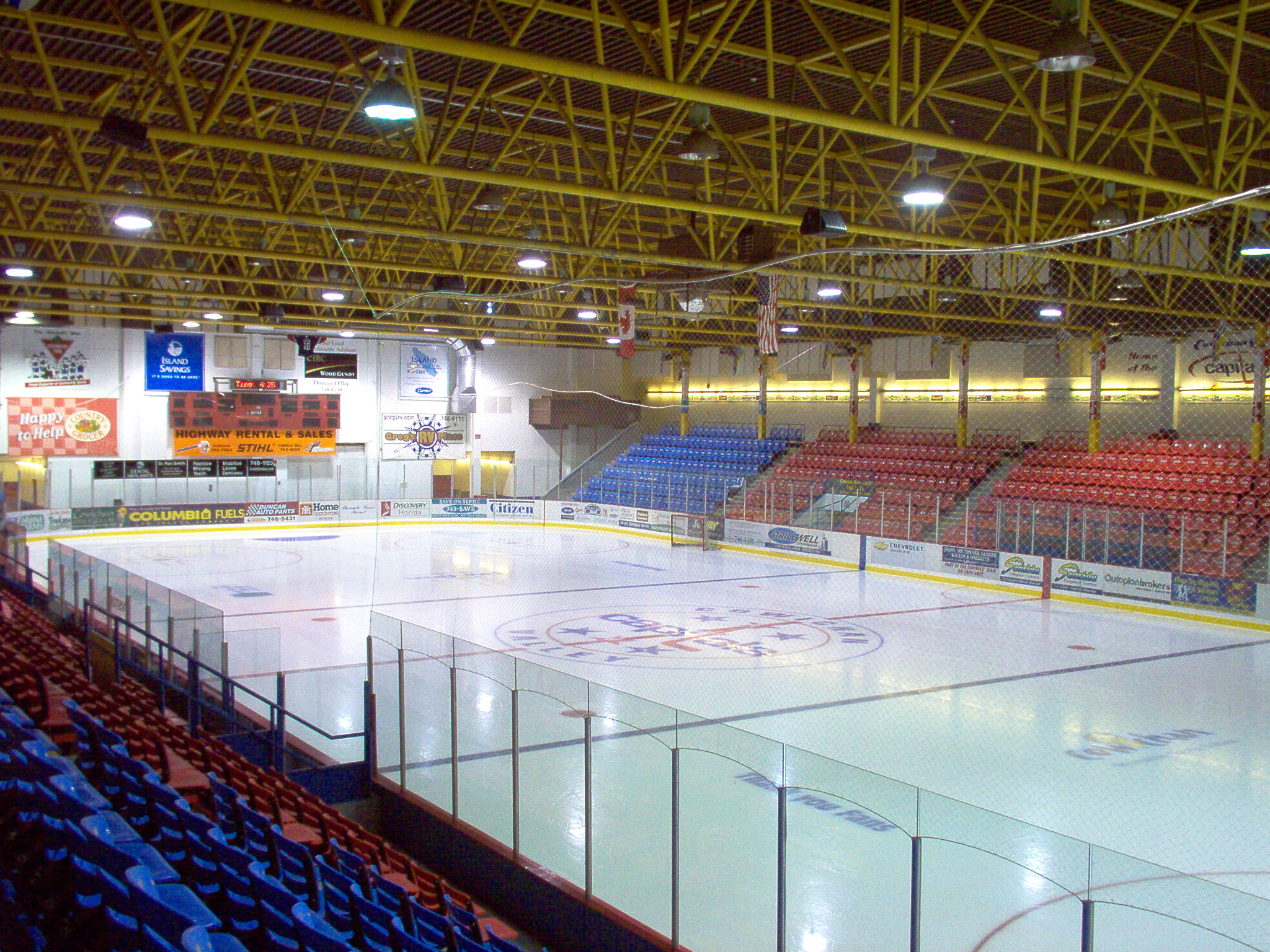
- Interactive map of Cowichan Community Centre
- Location: 2687 James St. Duncan, BC
- Owner: Municipality of North Cowichan
- Capacity: Hockey: 2,040 (1,350 seated)

Construction
- Opened: 1978

Tenant
- Cowichan Valley Capitals (BCHL) (1980–1984, 1988–1990, 1993–Present)

The Cowichan Valley Arena is a 2,040-seat multipurpose arena in North Cowichan, British Columbia, adjoined to the Cowichan Community Centre. It is home to the Cowichan Valley Capitals ice hockey team of the British Columbia Hockey League. Next to the Arena is the Gymnasium.

The Heritage Hall is a large hall upstairs connected to the Arena; it is a "Hall of Fame" for the Capitals and all the professional hockey players who come from Cowichan Valley.

=== Vancouver Canucks ===
The Vancouver Canucks have hosted their Training Camp at least three times in Cowichan Valley, 1980, 1984 and 1986.

=== "World's Biggest Hockey Stick & Puck" ===
Once mounted on the eastern wall of the arena is a 62 m (205 ft) Hockey Stick, and Puck; the stick was declared the World's Biggest by Guinness World Records. Built in 1985, at Penticton, British Columbia, and modelled after Tony Tanti's stick, The Stick & Puck originally adorned the entrance to Expo '86, albeit a slightly different pose, beside the "Largest Flagpole". A society to get the Stick to North Cowichan was launched after Expo 86 ended, the attempt was successful and funds were obtained to pay for the dismantling, transportation, and reconstruction of the stick. The Stick was dedicated on May 21, 1988, 2 years and 1 day after Expo '86 opened.

The Stick dwarfs the one at Eveleth, Minnesota by 29 metres (Eveleth's is 33 m/110 ft), however Guinness originally said the Minnesota hockey stick was the largest as it was constructed from pure wood, while the Expo stick had a steel framework. On July 12, 2008, they reversed their decision and the hockey stick was declared the world's largest.

To ensure public safety, the hockey stick was dismantled in 2024 due to the decayed structure.

=== Arena upgrades ===
In November 2008, the Capitals & the Island Savings Centre Commission jointly bought a Centaur Products H-2105 scoreboard to bring the arena up to Junior "A" standards. The Cowichan Community Centre joins a growing list of BCHL arenas to have a centre-ice hung scoreboard.

=== Arena image gallery ===
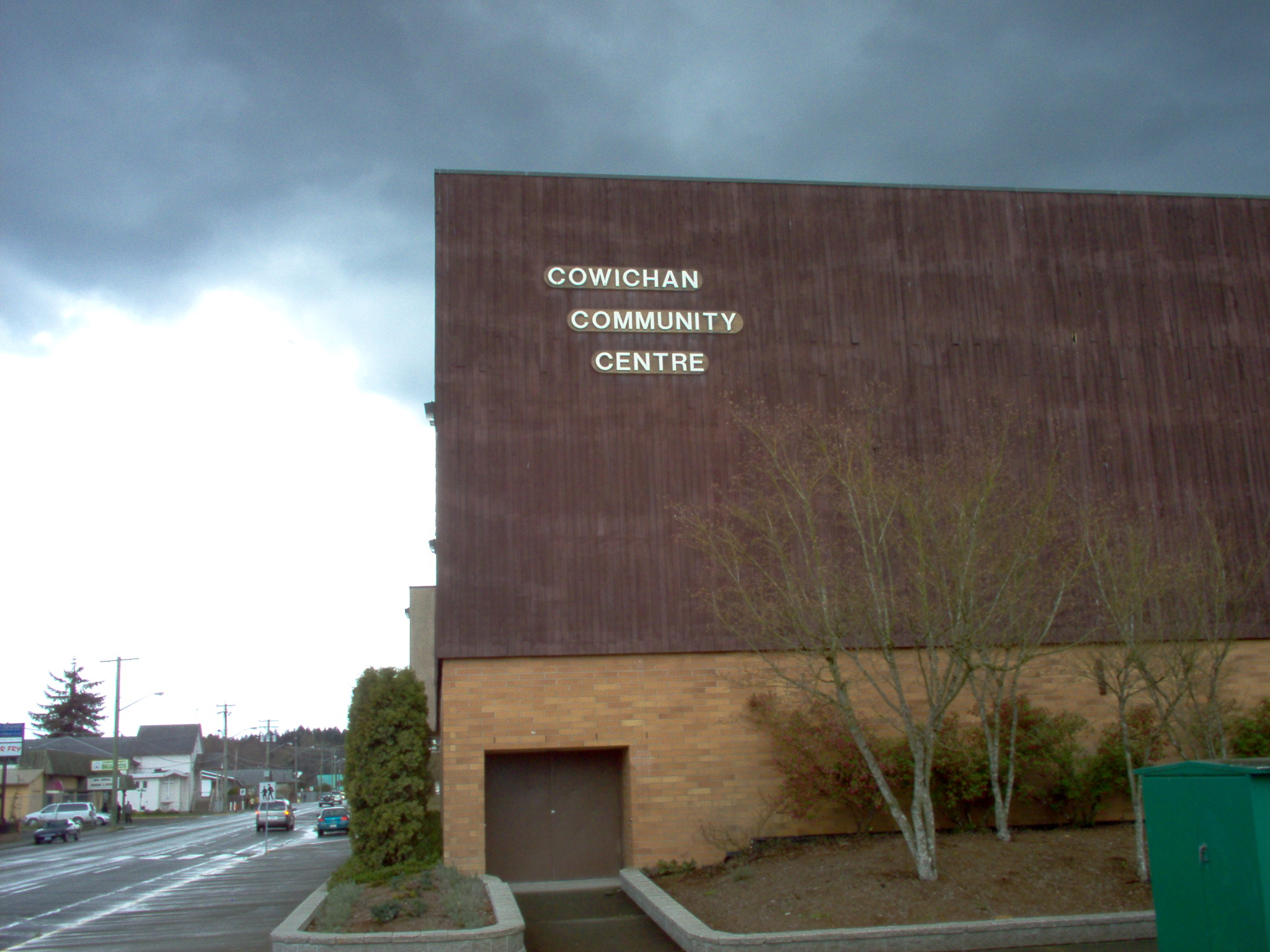
Former exterior signage, now has new siding

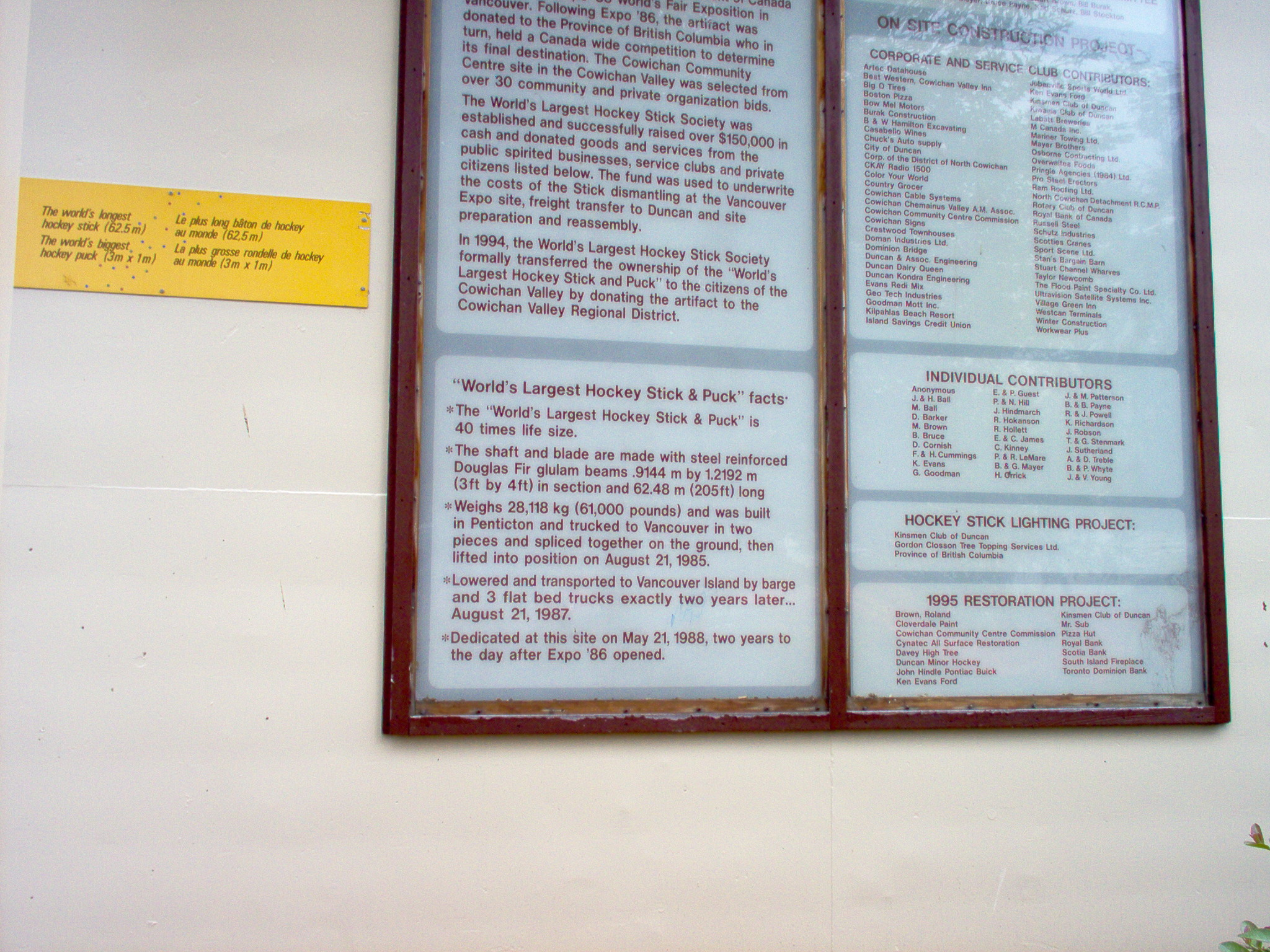
Hockey Stick Facts

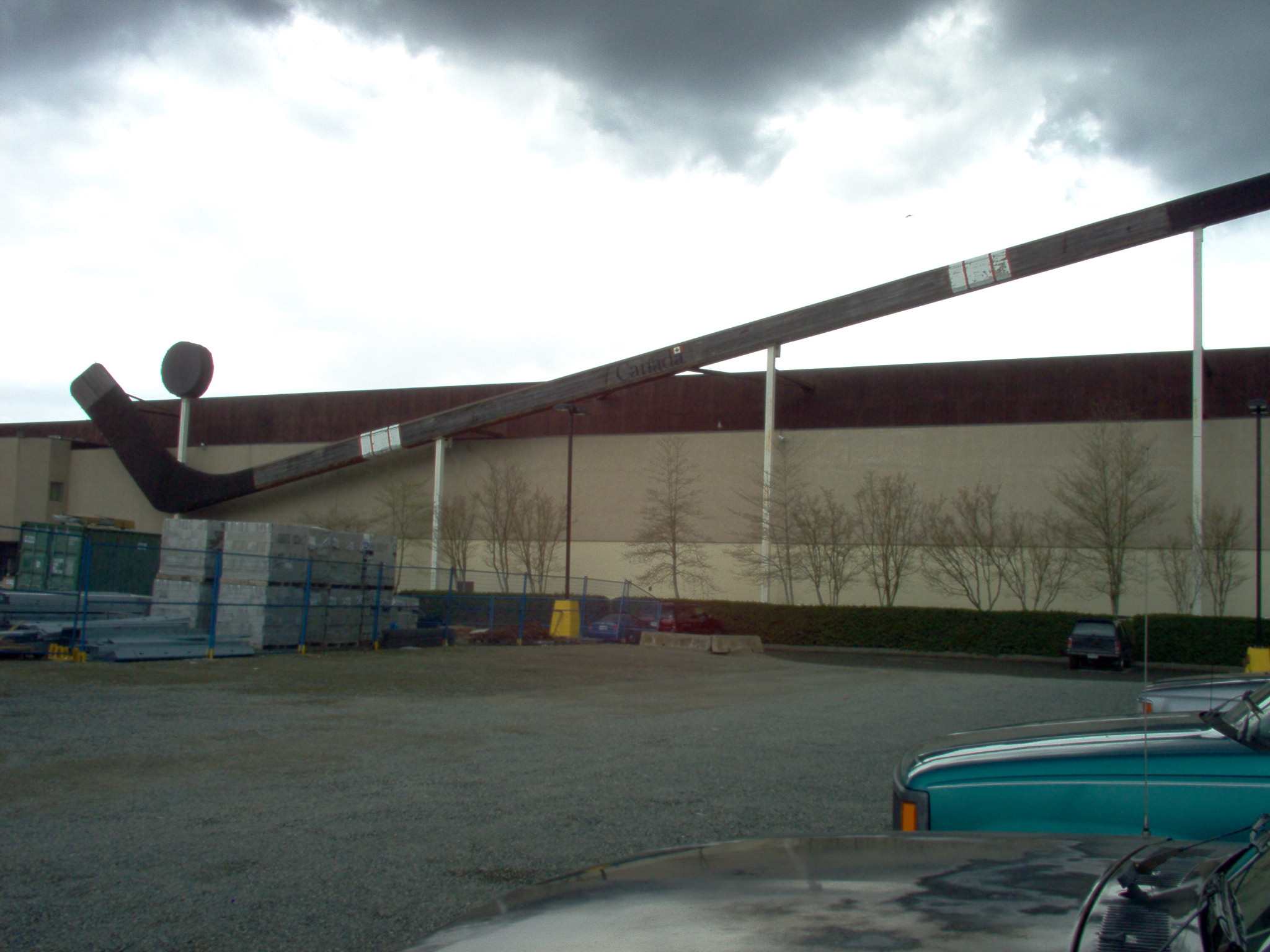
The Stick, from Expo '86

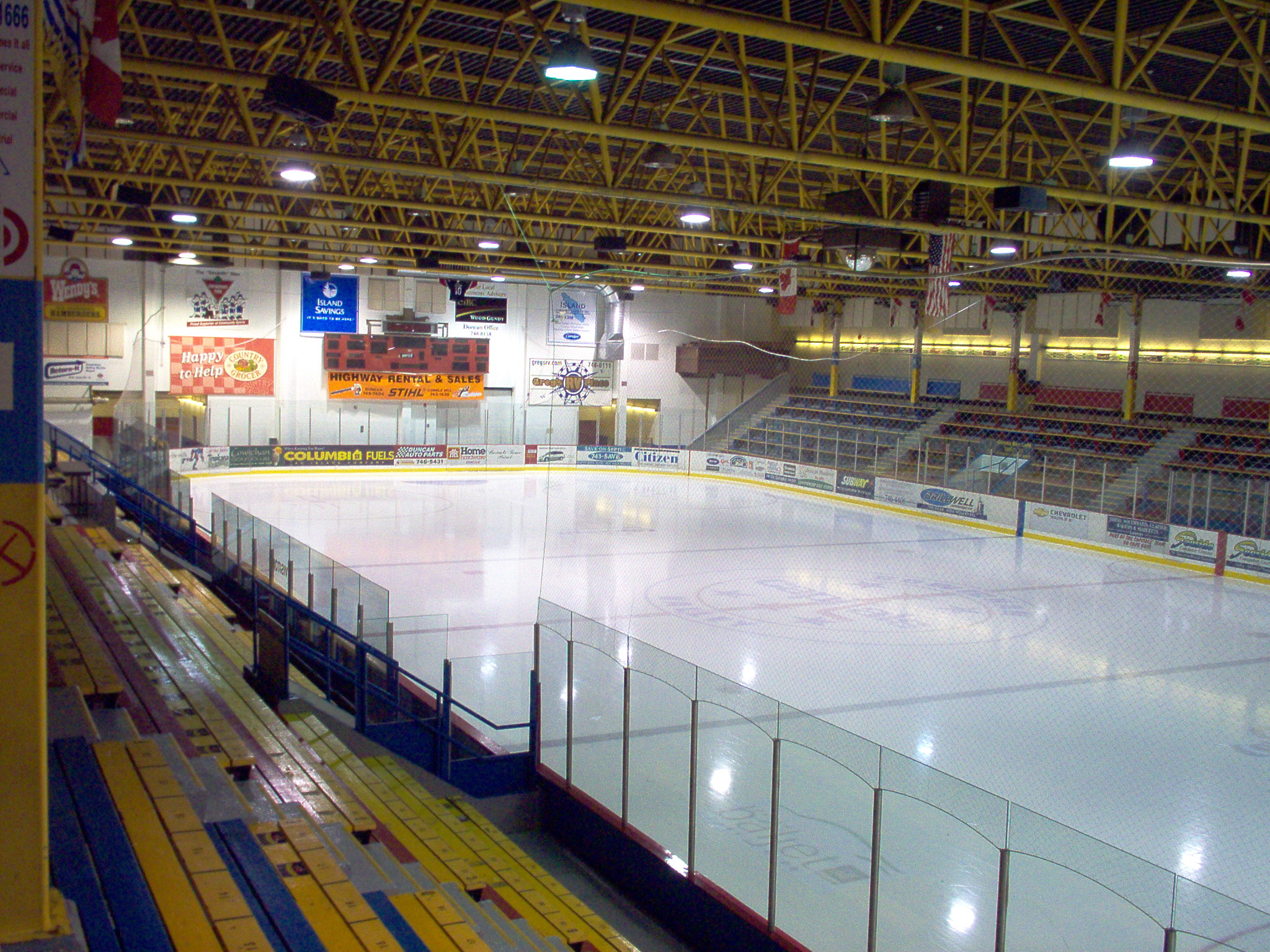
Old Bleachers before 2007-08 BCHL Season

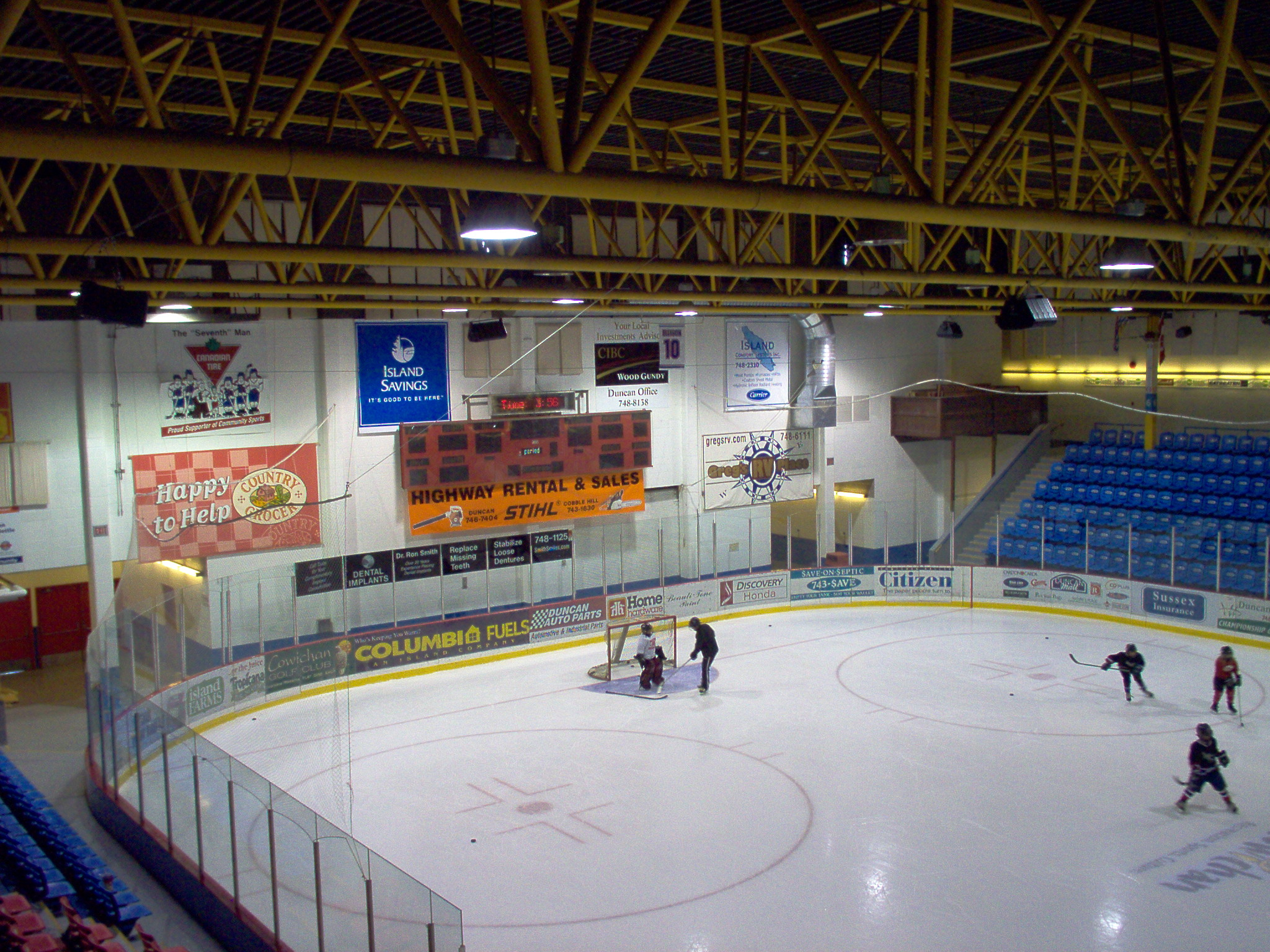
North End

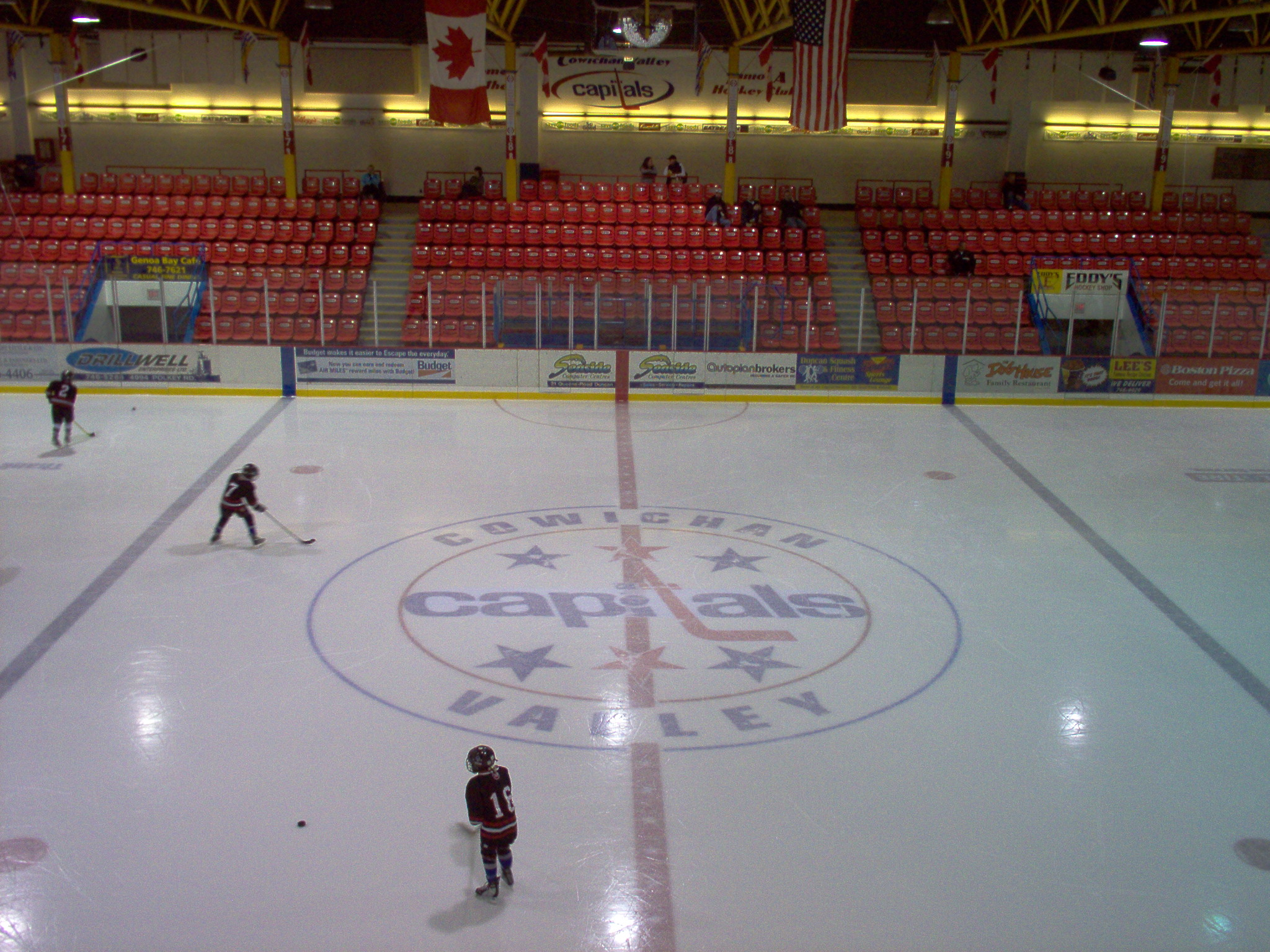
Centre, Looking at East End

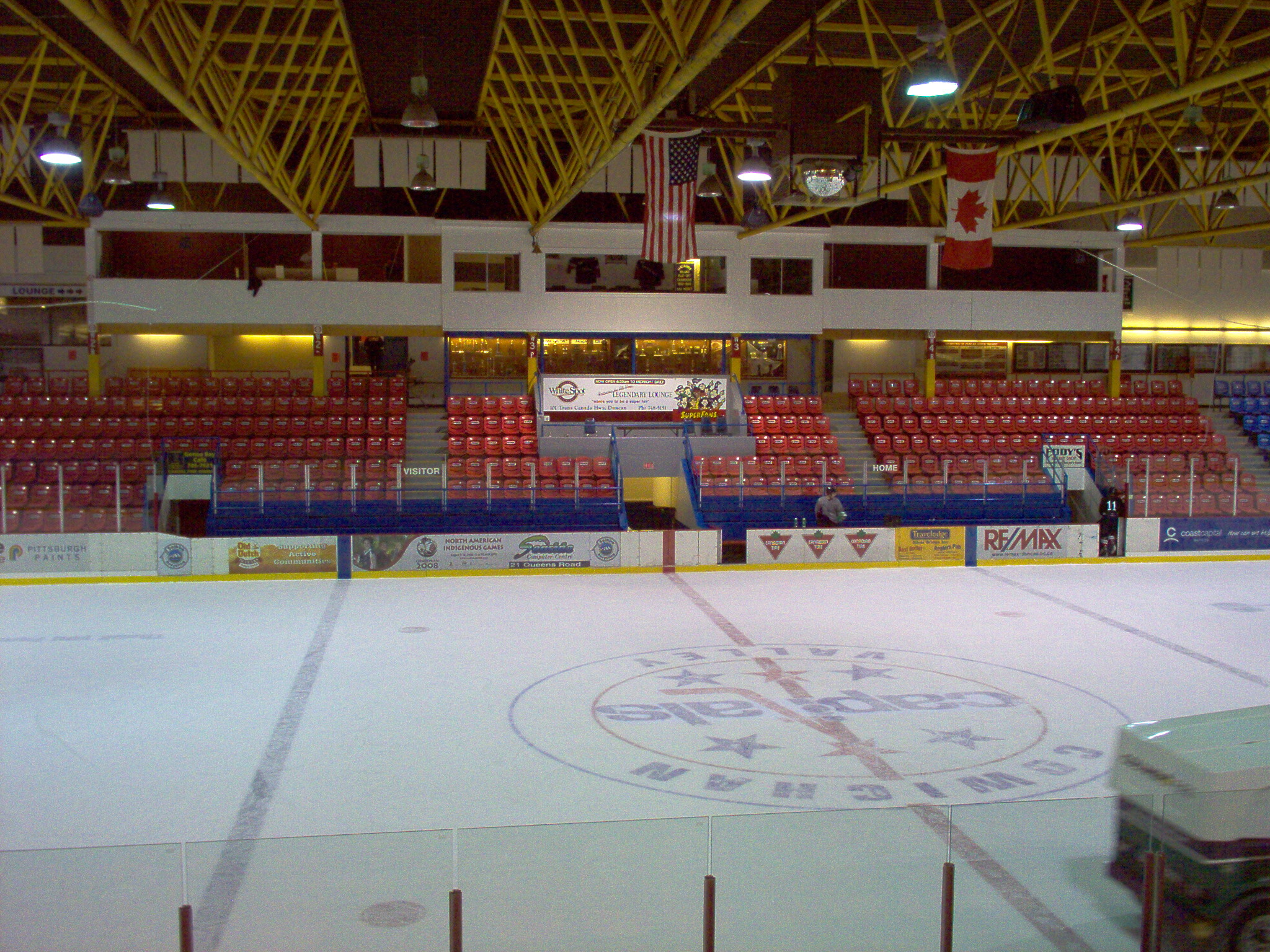
Centre, luxury boxes

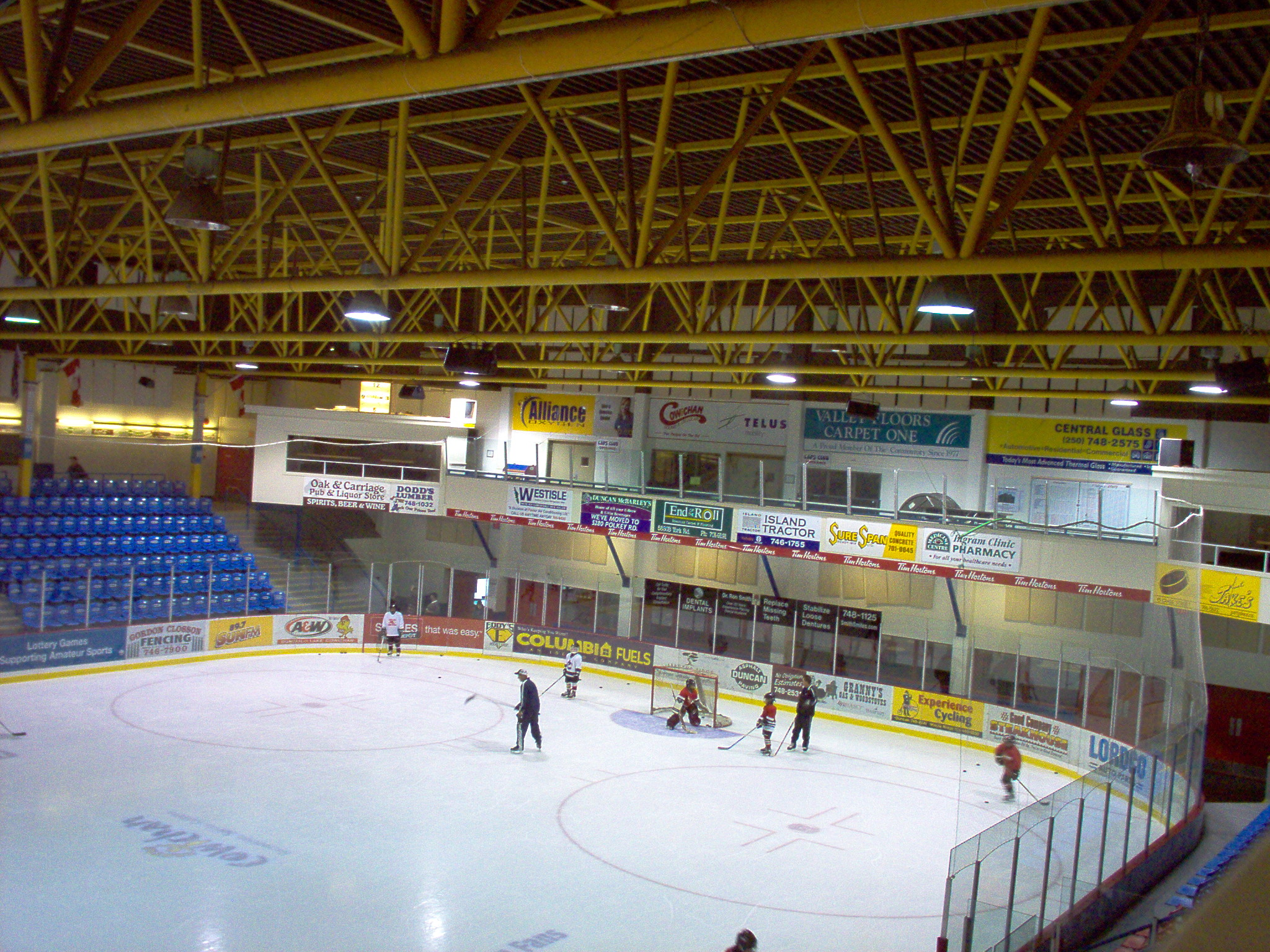
South End, balcony & boxes
