= Gerry Czarnecki =

American corporate executive

Gerald Milton Czarnecki
- Education: Temple University, Michigan State University
- Occupations: Corporate Executive, Author, Leadership Counselor
- Spouse: Lois Rae DiJoseph (1965–present)
- Children: Robyn Alexandra (b. 1969)
- Website: www.GerryCzarnecki.com

Gerald (Gerry) M. Czarnecki (born March 22, 1940) is an American corporate executive, an author of leadership books, and the founder of the National Leadership Institute, a non-profit organization.

== Early life ==
Gerald Milton Czarnecki was born in Philadelphia, the son of Casimer Czarnecki, a manufacturing worker, and Rose-Mary Czarnecki, a homemaker. Raised in the Philadelphia metropolitan area, he attended Jenkintown High School and graduated in 1957. After two years of higher education at Johns Hopkins University, Czarnecki left to attend the US Army Artillery Officer Candidate School in Fort Sill, Oklahoma, and was eventually commissioned a 2nd Lieutenant in the US Army Artillery. He then became an instructor at the Field Artillery School until his release from active duty in 1963. After leaving active duty as a First Lieutenant, he attended Temple University where he completed his B.S. in Economics in 1965, and Michigan State University where he earned an M.A. in Economics in 1967. Gerry returned to active duty as a captain and served as Assistant Chief of Staff, G-4, VI Army Corps in Battle Creek, Michigan.

== Career ==
From 1968 to 1979 Czarnecki held various general management positions beginning at Continental Bank of Chicago and culminating with his appointment as Executive Vice President of Finance & Administration at Republic Bank Houston. Over the next four years, Czarnecki rose quickly through the executive ranks to become Senior Vice President of Finance for the Republic Bank Corporation. From 1984 to 1987 he served as President & CEO of Altus Bank before joining an investor group headed by former U.S. Treasury Secretary William E. Simon to become chairman, President & CEO of Honfed Bank in Honolulu, Hawaii. During his stay in Hawaii, Czarnecki was elected Chairman of the Hawaii State Chamber of Commerce, a position he held for two consecutive terms. His book Lead with Love incorporates the interpersonal principles he learned while in Hawaii, most notably “Aloha,” an affectionate social concept at the heart of Hawaiian culture. Following the sale of Honfed Bank to Bank of America in 1992, Czarnecki continued as Chairman & CEO.

In 1993 Czarnecki was part of the team recruited by Louis Gerstner to begin the turnaround of IBM Corporation. Serving as a Senior Vice President of Human Resources and Administration, Czarnecki helped implement Gerstner's business policies and corporate culture changes, which are largely credited with saving IBM from going out of business in the early 1990s. His resignation was however seen as unexpected. Following his employment with IBM, Czarnecki held executive positions at a variety of companies beginning with a stint as President of UNC Incorporated and including time at Florida Computer Services and O2 Media Inc. During this time he also began giving leadership seminars designed to help managers at various levels achieve peak performance in the workplace. Czarnecki's first book You’re in Charge… What Now? is based upon his most popular seminar of the same name.

Czarnecki is the co-founder of The National Leadership Institute (NLI), Chairman of the National Association of Corporate Directors (NACD) Florida Chapter, Senior Managing Director & Executive Producer at Ventureland Productions, and the chairman and CEO of The Deltennium Group, a consulting firm offering leadership training, career coaching, financial planning, and investment management services. Czarnecki also serves as a member of the Board of Directors of State Farm Insurance Company and Del Global Technology, Inc., and is Chairman of the Audit Committee of each company. He is chairman of the Board of Aftersoft, Inc. as well as serving on the advisory board for Private Capital, Inc.

== Writing ==
Czarnecki is the author of several books:

- You’re in Charge…What Now?, Griffin Publishing Group (August 2003). ISBN 978-1-58000-109-0
- You’re a Non-Profit Director…What Now?, National Leadership Institute; 2nd edition (April 3, 2006). ISBN 978-1-932430-03-5
- Success Principles for Leaders, Milton Rae Press (January 1, 2009). ISBN 978-0-9820750-0-5
- Lead with Love, Milton Rae Press (April 6, 2010). ISBN 978-0-9820750-2-9
- Just One Thing After Another, O2 Media Press (October 20, 2010).
- Take Two and Call Me in the Morning, Milton Rae Press (April 1, 2013). ISBN 978-1614483236

Following the success of his leadership seminar You’re in Charge… What Now?, Czarnecki decided to put his ideas on paper, publishing his first book in 2003 and naming it after the seminar. His successive books delve into similar subject matter, providing a resource for leaders looking to improve performance as well as business and interpersonal relationships.

Lead with Love is perhaps the most critically acclaimed of Czarnecki's books, garnering praise from Wayne Huizenga, who said “Any manager aspiring to superior leadership would be wise to study Gerry’s advice,” and Chicken Soup for the Soul co-creator Mark Victor Hansen, who stated “In Lead with Love, Gerry Czarnecki shows us how to achieve our human potential and elevate our lives and the lives of those around us.” Lead with Love became an Amazon best-seller on April 7, 2010, after Czarnecki launched a successful marketing campaign encouraging fans to purchase the book simultaneously on that day.

== Personal life ==
Czarnecki is married to the former Lois Rae DiJoseph. They have a daughter Robyn Alexandra. Czarnecki and his wife live in Florida, where, in addition to his many jobs and services, he enjoys golfing, reading, and theatre.
