= Jon Ramer =

Jon Eliot Ramer (born 1958) is an American entrepreneur, civic leader, inventor, and musician. He is co-founder of several technology companies including Ramer and Associates, ELF Technologies, Inc.,(whose main solution, Serengeti, was purchased by Thomson Reuters) and Smart Channels. The designer and co-founder of several Deep Social Networks, he is the former executive director of the Interra Project, and a co-founder of Ideal Network, a group-buying social enterprise that donates a percentage of every purchase to a non-profit or school. Ideal Network is a certified B-Corp that was recognized as "Best in the World for Community" in 2012 by B-Labs. He is also the designer and co-founder of Compassionate Action Network International, a 501(c)(3) organization based in Seattle, that led the effort to make the city the first in the world to affirm Karen Armstrong's Charter for Compassion. Most recently, Ramer conceived of and produced the "Compassion Games: Survival of the Kindest" in response to a challenge from the mayor of Louisville, Kentucky to other cities to outdo Louisville's compassionate action as measured by hours of community service. Ramer also serves as Director and Chief Technology Officer at Four Worlds International Institute, with a focus on the Campaign To Protect the Sacred. The campaign birthed the International Treaty to Protect the Sacred from Tar Sands Projects, signed by over fifty different tribes throughout North America. Ramer is also the songwriter and lead guitarist in the band Once And For All.

== Biography ==
Ramer was born in Miami, Florida and raised in Brooklyn, New York. As a young man Ramer attended both the Juilliard School and the Manhattan School of Music in New York City, where he founded Blue Pearl Music. Ramer enjoyed a successful career as a musician and performer until in 1982 a chance meeting with Chilean statesman and businessman Fernando Flores led him to develop interests in technology, networks, and communications. Ramer subsequently co-founded Ramer and Associates, Inc. and partnered with Action Technologies Inc. to design and distribute a groupware software program called The Coordinator, one of the first email system and wide area networking platform for personal computers. Ramer and Associates Inc. was subsequently acquired by Flores' Business Design Associates.

After the events of September 11, 2001, Ramer entered into the world of non-profits and community organizing. Seeking to apply what he had learned in business to effect social change via communication technologies and community engagement, Ramer co-founded the Unity Project Seattle —an organization dedicated to interfaith dialogue and action—often using his music to create bridges between different religious traditions. Ramer met Greg Steltenpohl, founder of Odwalla and together with Dee Hock, founder of Visa, they started the Interra Project, a social enterprise that sought to fund non-profits via purchases made by consumers from local merchants. In 2008, Ramer's work with the interfaith community led him to be an organizational participant in Seeds of Compassion, an event in Seattle coordinated around the H.H. Dalai Lama's visit. Following Seeds of Compassion, Ramer co-founded the Compassionate Action Network and in his initial role as executive director conceived and launched the Ten Year Campaign for Compassionate Cities, which has now spread to over two hundred and fifty cities worldwide. In 2010 Ramer co-founded Ideal Network, a B-Corporation whose business model included donations to non-profits with every consumer purchase. In response to a slew of gun violence in the city of Seattle in summer of 2012, Ramer conceived of and produced the "Compassion Games: Survival of the Kindest" to encourage a culture of kindness, social justice, and compassion.

== Companies and Organizations founded ==
- Ramer and Associates, Inc.
- ELF Technologies (ELF)
- Smart Channels
- The Interra Project
- Compassionate Action Network International
- Compassionate Seattle
- Compassion Games International
- Ideal Network

Two of these companies, ELF and Smart Channels, were based on patents Ramer filed.

== Network design ==
Ramer has designed several online networks with sustainability, education, compassion or human rights as a focus:

- Young Partners in Development
- Wiser Earth the World Index of Social and Environmental Responsibility (WISER). WiserEarth is a project of the Natural Capital Institute.
- Four Worlds International Institute.
- The Change Makers Network for the Roots of Change (ROC) that promotes a sustainable food system in California by 2030.
- The Community Learning Exchange is a network administered by the Center for Ethical Leadership and funded by the Kellogg Foundation

== Awards and appointments ==
- Voted "Best in the World for Community" in 2012 by B-Labs.
- Bill Grace Legacy Award from the Center for Ethical Leadership
- Associate of the International Institute for Child Rights and Development at the International Institute of Child rights and Development, University of Victoria, B.C.

== Publications ==
- Co-Author: “Weaving Our Strategies Together – Turning What We Have into What We Need”
- Co-Author: “Member Centric Networks of Community Alliances” published by the Social Science Research Council (SSRC)
- Contributor to: “Collective Intelligence: Creating a Prosperous World at Peace”.
- Co-Author with Chief Phil Lane Jr.: “Deep Social Networks and the Digital Fourth Way”
- Co-Author with Chief Phil Lane Jr.: "Utilizing the Digital 4th Way As A Platform for Building A People Centered ASEAN"
- Interview in Forbes and Financial Post: "Leading the Charge to a More Compassionate Future"
- Interview in The Seattle Times: "Seattle Takes Up 'Who's the Kindest?' Dare from Louisville"
- Interview in the Huffington Post: "A Timely Interview With Jon Ramer About Creating Collective Compassion (Part 1)"

== Patents ==
ELF Technologies: “Interaction Network System with Electronic Organizational Actors”

Smart Channels : “Dynamic configuration of context- sensitive personal sites and membership channels”

== Coined phrases ==
In his most recent work with Phil Lane Jr., Ramer coined the phrase “Deep Social Networks” which refers to online networks that “produce meaningful results and build deeper relationships that learn and grow in ways that sustain and enhance human life for all inhabitants of mother Earth.”

"Regenerative Commerce"
