= Kamloops =

Kamloops Tk'əmlúps
- City
- City of Kamloops
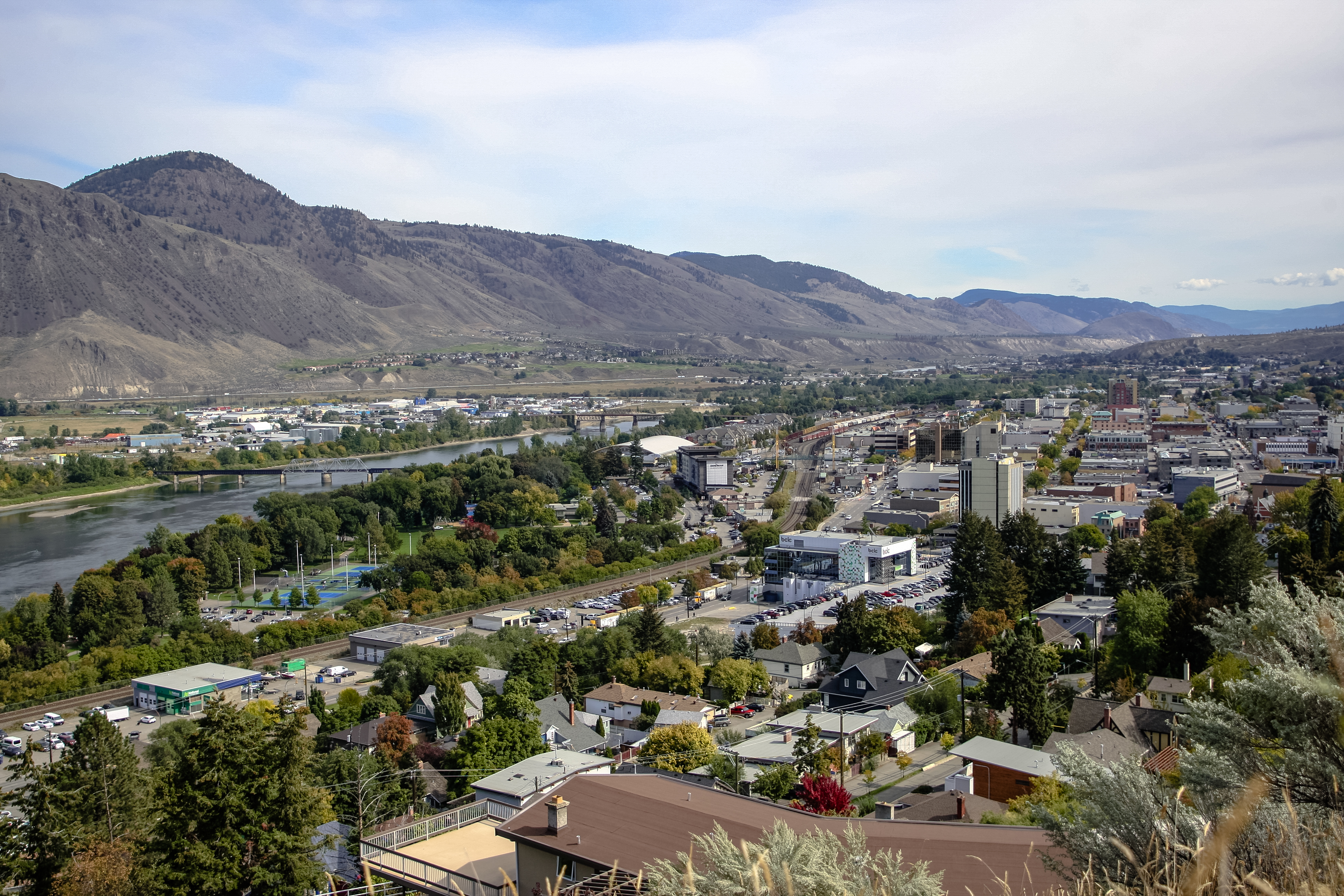
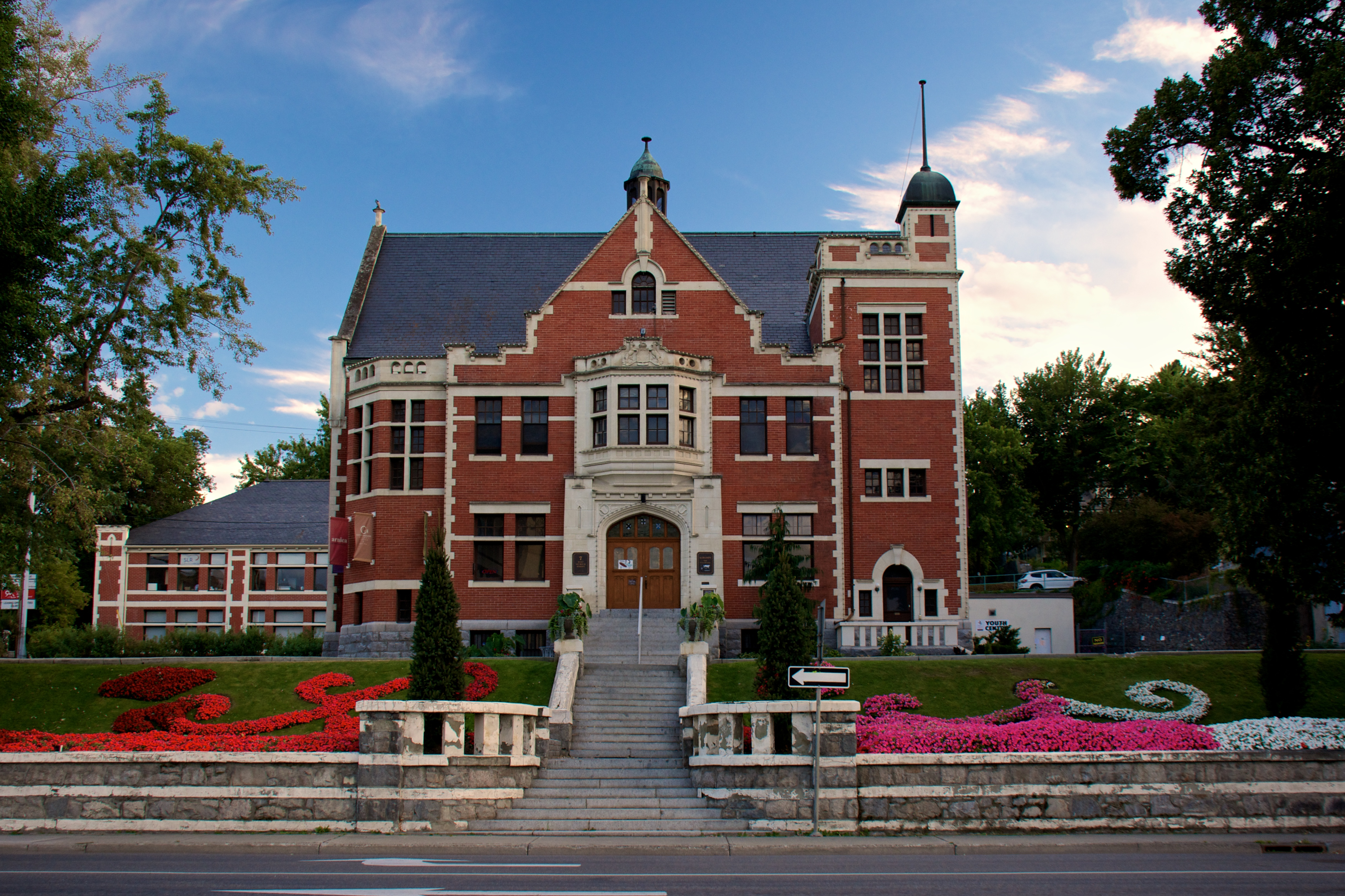
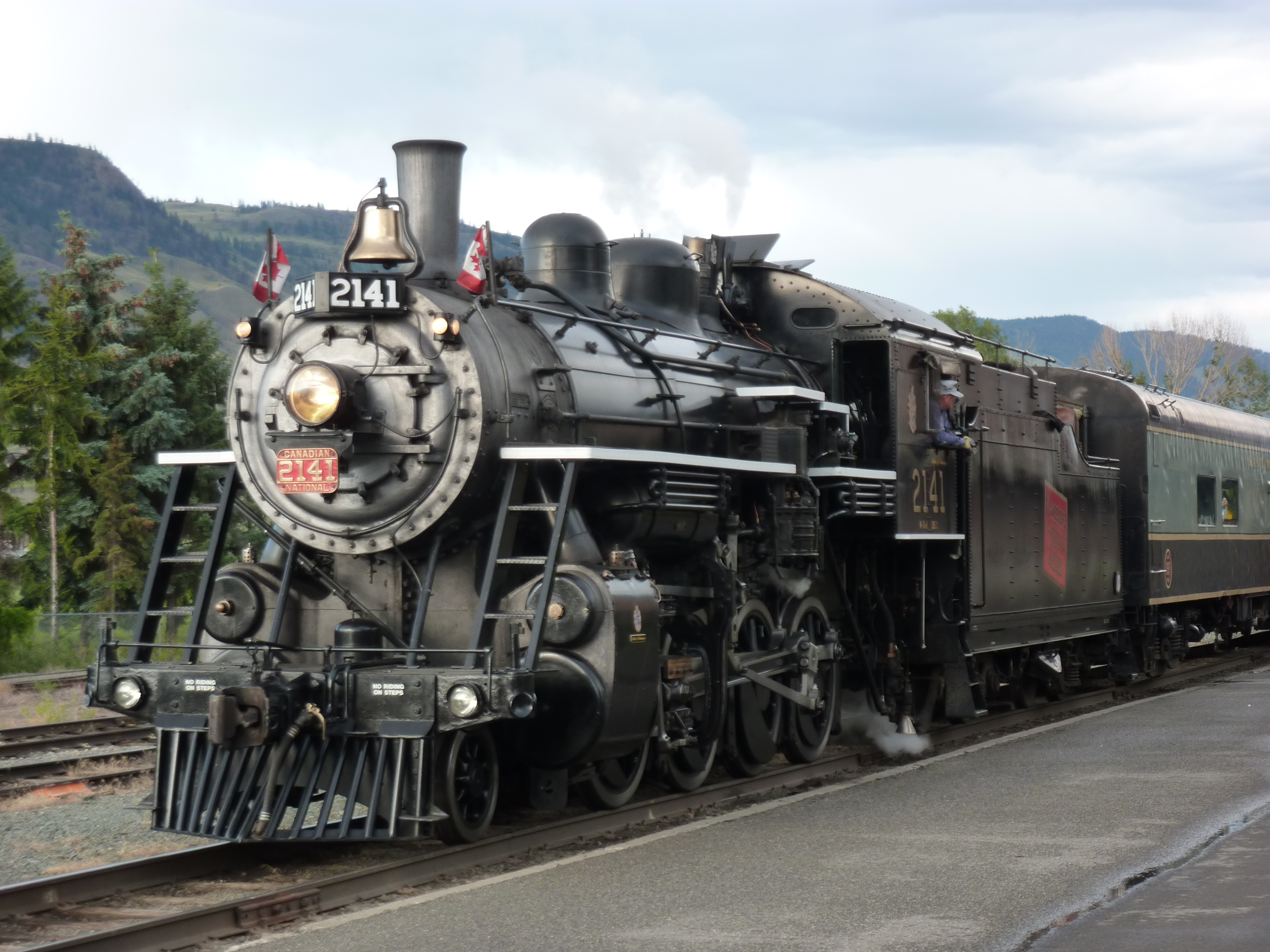
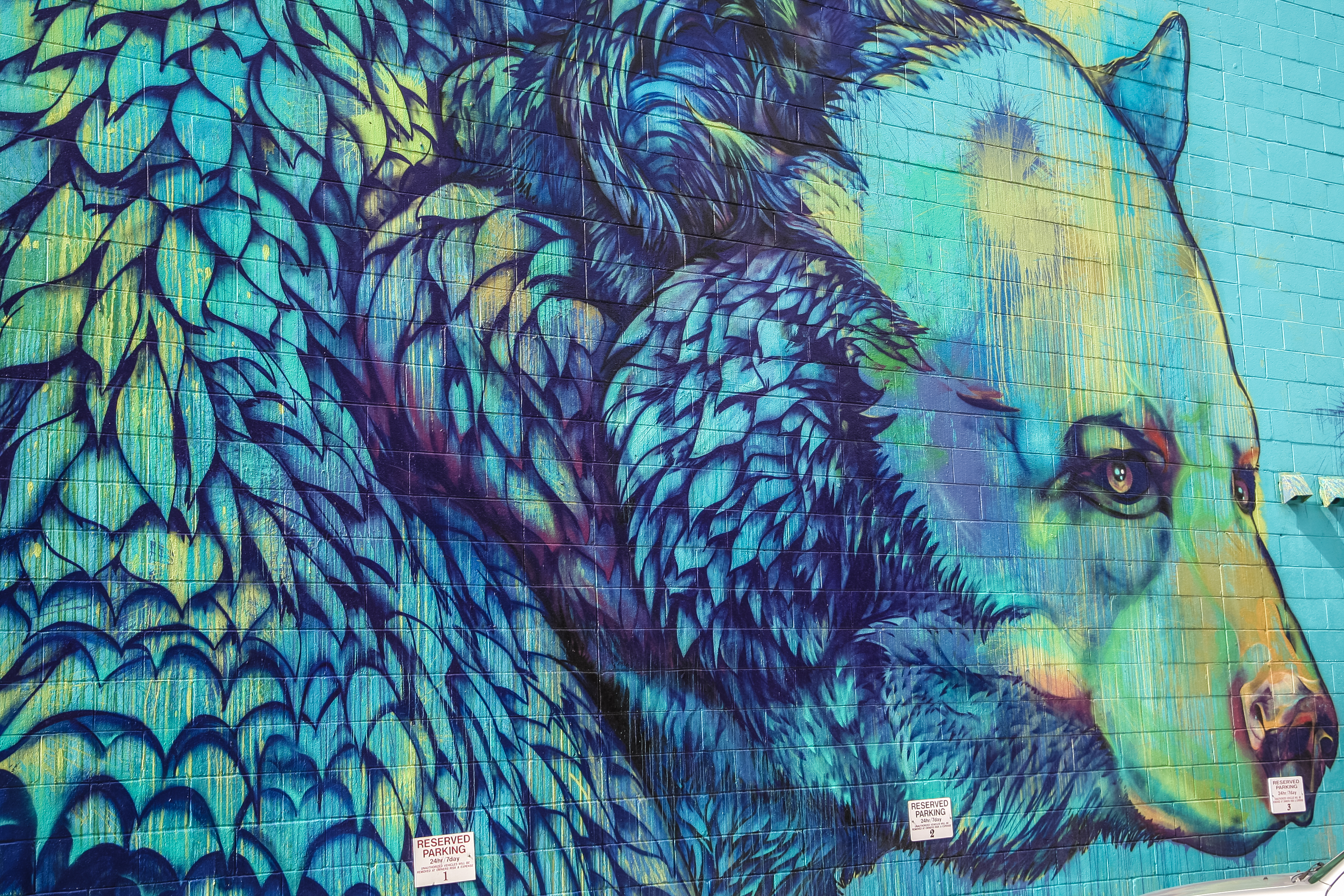
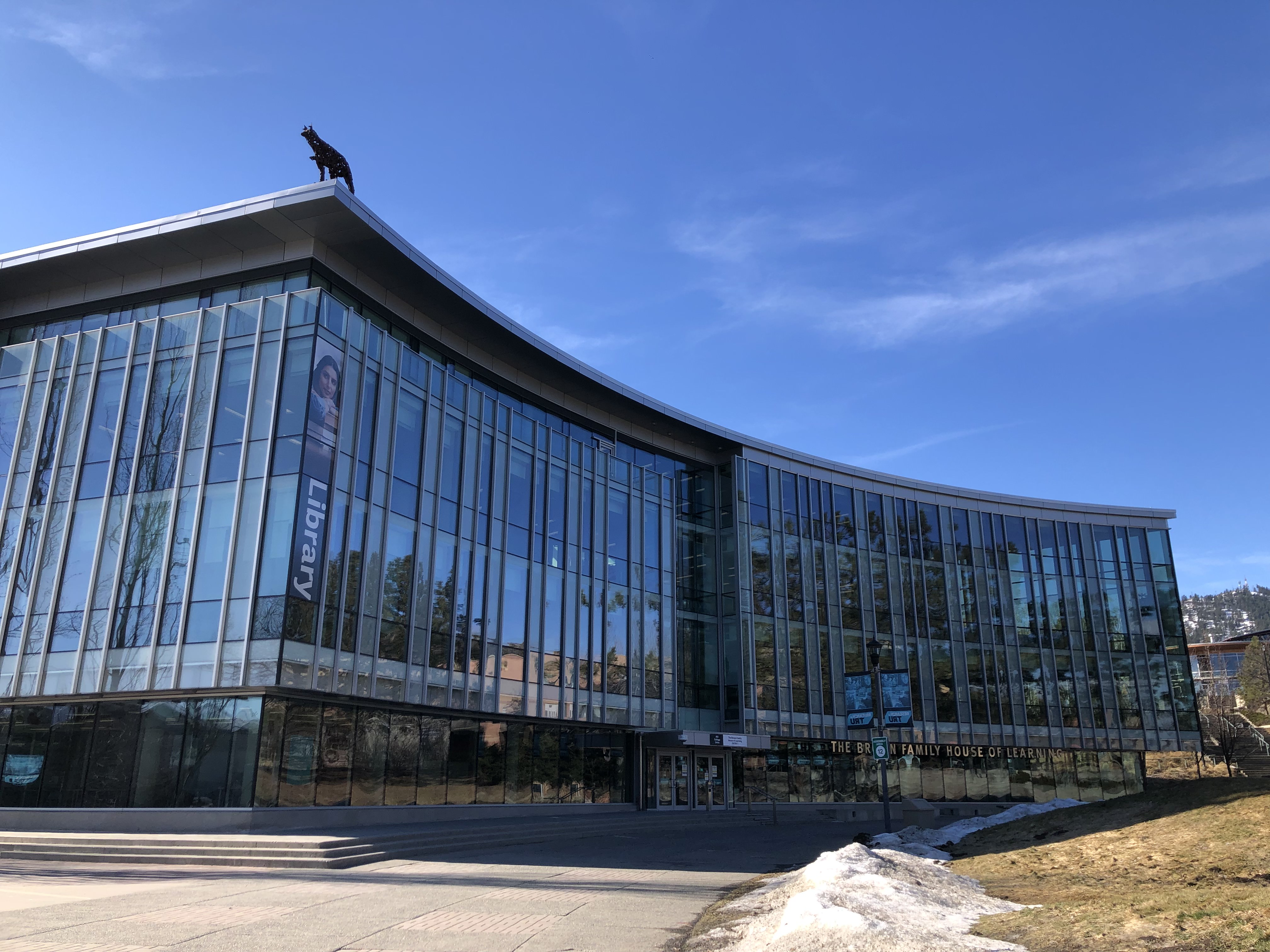
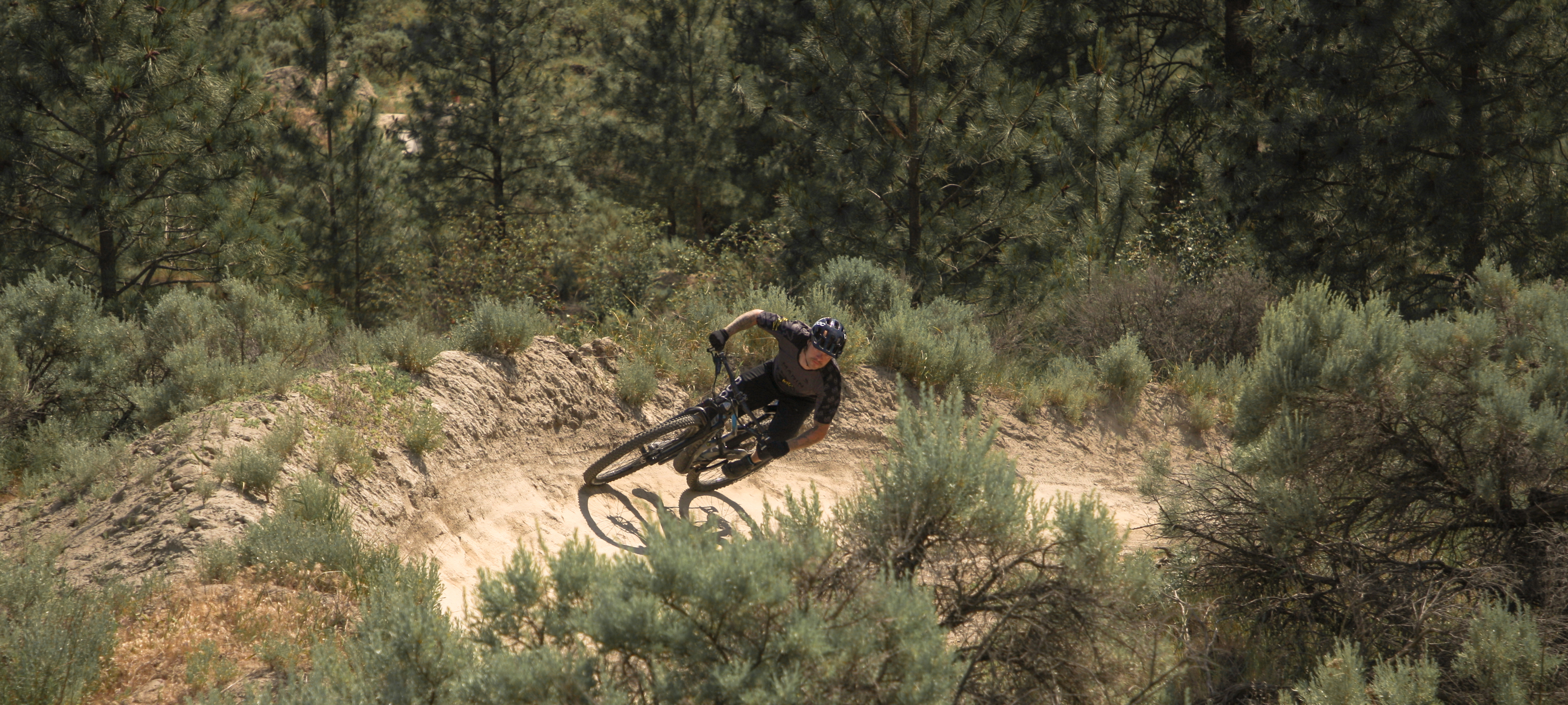
- Downtown Kamloops situated in the Thompson Valley The West End's Old Courthouse Kamloops Heritage Railway Art Mural on Seymour Street Thompson Rivers University Mountain Biking at Kamloops Bike Ranch

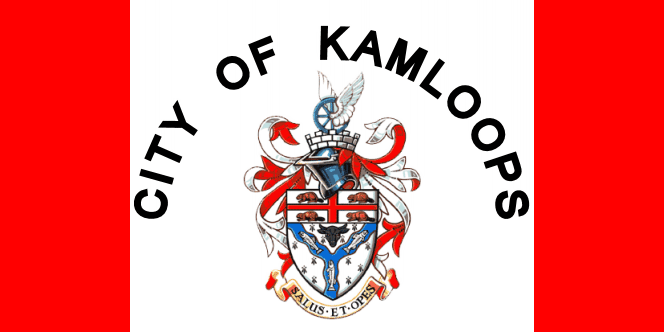
- Flag Coat of arms Logo
- Motto(s): Salus et Opes ('Health and Wealth')
- Location of Kamloops in British Columbia Kamloops (Canada)
- Coordinates: 50°40′33″N 120°20′22″W
- Country: Canada
- Province: British Columbia
- Region: Thompson Country
- Regional District: Thompson–Nicola
- Incorporated: 1893
- Amalgamated: 1973

Government
  - Type: Elected City Council
  - Mayor: Mike O'Reilly
  - Governing body: Kamloops City Council
  - MP: Frank Caputo

Area
  - Land: 299.25 km^{2} (115.54 sq mi)
- Elevation: 345 m (1,132 ft)

Population (2025)
  - City: ▲109,633
  - Metro: 127,198
- Demonym: Kamloopsian
- Time zone: UTC−07:00 (PT)
- Forward sortation area: V1S, V2B – V2E, V2H
- Area codes: 250, 778, 236, 672
- Website: kamloops.ca

Kamloops (/ˈkæmluːps/ KAM-loops) is a city in south-central British Columbia, Canada, at the confluence of the North and South Thompson Rivers, which join to become the Thompson River in Kamloops, and east of Kamloops Lake. The city is a commercial centre for, and largest city within, Thompson Country, a region of the British Columbia Interior.

The city was incorporated in 1893 with about 500 residents. The Canadian Pacific Railway was completed through downtown in 1886, and the Canadian National arrived in 1912, making Kamloops an important transportation hub. Kamloops North station is the first stop on VIA Rail's eastbound transcontinental service, The Canadian, while the Rocky Mountaineer and the Kamloops Heritage Railway both use Kamloops station.

With a 2025 population of 109,633, it is the twelfth largest municipality in the province. The Kamloops census agglomeration is ranked 36th among census metropolitan areas and agglomerations in Canada with a 2025 population of 127,198.

Kamloops is home to Thompson Rivers University as well as the Royal Inland Hospital and the British Columbia Lottery Corporation, all of which significantly shape the city's economy. The city is promoted as the Tournament Capital of Canada. It hosts more than 100 sporting tournaments each year at facilities such as the Tournament Capital Centre, Sandman Centre, and Tournament Capital Ranch. More recently, Kamloops has become a mountain biking destination; home to Canada's largest municipal bike park, the 26-hectare Kamloops Bike Ranch, the city is often described as the birthplace of freeride mountain biking.

== History ==
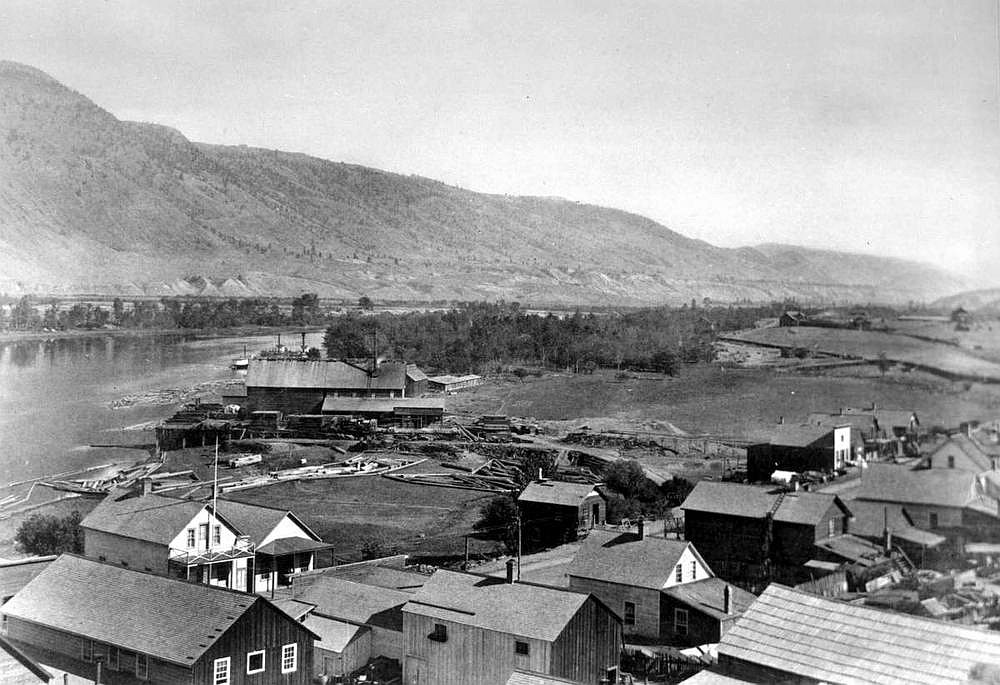
Kamloops and the Thompson River, 1886

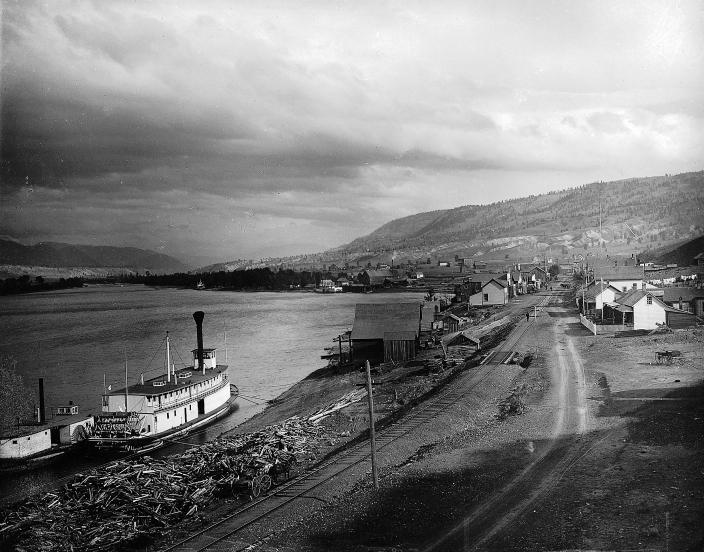
Paddle steamer at Kamloops in 1887

The first European explorers arrived in 1811. David Stuart, a trader sent from Fort Astoria, then still a Pacific Fur Company post, spent a winter with the Secwépemc people. In May of the following year, trader Alexander Ross established a post, which was known as "Fort Cumcloups".

The rival North West Company established Fort Shuswap nearby in the same year. The two businesses merged in 1813 when the North West Company bought the operations of the Pacific Fur Company. In 1821, the Hudson's Bay Company merged with the North West Company, and the post became known commonly as Thompson's River Post, or Fort Thompson. Later it was known as Fort Kamloops. The post's Chief Traders kept journals, which document a series of inter-Indian wars and personalities for the period, in addition to the daily business of the fur companies and their personnel along the entire Pacific Slope.

Soon after the forts were founded, Kwa'lila, chief of the main local village of the Secwépemc, moved his people closer to the trading post, so they could control access and gain in prestige and security. After Kwa'lila died, his nephew and foster son Nicola became chief. He later led an alliance of Syilx (Okanagan) and Nlaka'pamux peoples in the plateau country to the south around Stump, Nicola and Douglas lakes.

Relations between Nicola and the fur traders were often tense, but Chief Nicola was recognized for his aid to European settlers during the Fraser Canyon Gold Rush of 1858. He did try to control those who had been in parties waging violence and looting on the Okanagan Trail, which led from American territory to the Fraser goldfields. Throughout, Kamloops was an important way station on the route of the Hudson's Bay Brigade Trail, which connected Fort Vancouver with Fort Alexandria and the other forts in New Caledonia to the north (today's Omineca Country, roughly). It was integral during the onset of the Cariboo Gold Rush as the main route to the new goldfields around what was to become Barkerville.

The 1862 Pacific Northwest smallpox epidemic swept through the Kamloops area during the summer of that year, decimating the Secwepemc, Nlaka'pamux, and other indigenous peoples. They had no acquired immunity. The epidemic had started in Victoria and quickly spread throughout British Columbia, especially among First Nations. In June 1862, indigenous people went to Fort Kamloops seeking smallpox vaccine, William Manson, chief clerk at the fort, vaccinated numerous persons, but fatalities were extremely high. In late September he reported "smallpox still raging amongst the Indians".

In October a newspaper in Victoria reported an eyewitness account from Fort Kamloops, saying

The Indians have been nearly exterminated at [Kamloops]: only sixteen have escaped out of a large settlement. Their bodies are strewing the ground in all directions.

About two-thirds of the Secwepemc died during the epidemic. In the aftermath, colonists took over traditional lands of the Secwepemc and many other indigenous groups throughout British Columbia.

The gold rush of the 1860s and the construction of the Canadian Pacific Railway, which reached Kamloops from the West in 1885, brought further growth. The City of Kamloops was incorporated in 1893 with a population of about 500, mostly concentrated in the West End.

In 1908 due to the Tuberculosis Pandemic a sanatorium was opened west of the city named King Edward Memorial Sanatorium, the sanatorium was later acquired by the provincial government in 1921, being renamed to Tranquille Sanatorium, it later closed in 1958. The Tranquille Institution reopened in 1959 to treat people with mental problems, although it later closed in 1983.

In 1967, Kamloops amalgamated with the Town of North Kamloops.

In 1973, Kamloops amalgamated with the Districts of Brocklehurst, Dufferin, the Town of Valleyview, and the Kamloops Indian Band, and the communities of Dallas, Campbell Creek, Barnhartvale, Heffley Creek, Rayleigh, Westsyde and Knutsford. In 1976, the Kamloops Indian Band split from the City of Kamloops.

In May 2021, an anthropologist announced she had used ground-penetrating radar to find "probable" graves containing the remains of 215 children found at a former Kamloops Indian residential school, part of the Canadian Indian residential school system. The story was reported around the world, and five Catholic churches in Western Canada were burned down in the weeks following, since the school was operated by a Catholic order. As of February 2026, no bodies have been recovered.

On September 19, 2024 the Red Bridge was destroyed in a fire suspected to be the result of arson.

=== Etymology ===
"Kamloops" is the anglicized version of the Shuswap word "Tk'əmlúps", meaning "meeting of the waters". Shuswap is still spoken in the area by members of the Tk'emlúps Indian Band.

An alternate origin sometimes given for the name may have come from the native name's accidental similarity to the French "Camp des loups", meaning "Camp of Wolves"; many early fur traders were ethnic French. There are folk stories about an attack on a traders' camp by a pack of wolves. Other legendary versions recount a huge white wolf, or a pack of wolves and other animals, that were moving overland from the Nicola Country and were repelled by a single shot by John Tod, then chief trader. This prevented the wolves from attacking the fort and earned Tod a great degree of respect locally.

== Geography ==
Kamloops is in the Thompson Valley and the Montane Cordillera Ecozone. The city's centre is in the valley near the confluence of the Thompson River's north and south branches. Suburbs stretch for more than a dozen kilometres along the north and south branches, as well as to the steep hillsides along the south portion of the city and lower northeast hillsides. The area surrounding the city is sometimes referred to as the Thompson Country.

Robert W. Service in 1904 described Kamloops as his delightful life and wrote "Life was pleasant, and the work was light. At four o'clock we were on our horses, riding over the rolling ridges, or into spectral gulches that rose to ghostlier mountains. It was like the scenery of Mexico, weirdly desolate and aridly morose. A discouraging land, forbidding in its weariness and resigned to ruin."

Kamloops Indian Band areas begin just to the northeast of the downtown core but are not within the city limits. As a result of this placement, it is necessary to leave Kamloops' city limits and pass through the band lands before re-entering the city limits to access the northernmost communities of Rayleigh and Heffley Creek. Kamloops is surrounded by the smaller communities of Cherry Creek, Pritchard, Savona, Scotch Creek, Adams Lake, Chase, Paul Lake, Pinantan and various others.

=== Neighbourhoods ===
The following are the officially recognized neighbourhoods within the city of Kamloops. Informally recognized sub-areas are listed beneath the neighbourhoods to which they belong:

- Aberdeen
  - Pacific Way
- Barnhartvale
- Batchelor Heights
  - Batchelor Hills
  - Lac Du Bois
- Brocklehurst
  - Airport Entry Corridor
  - Brock Centre
  - North Kamloops West
  - Ord Road
- Campbell Creek
  - The Burrows
- Dallas
- Downtown
  - Columbia Precinct
  - Downtown Core
  - East End
  - East Entry Corridor
  - Waterfront District
  - West Entry Corridor
- Dufferin
- Heffley Creek
- Juniper Ridge
- Knutsford
- Lower Sahali
- Mission Flats
- Noble Creek
- North Kamloops
  - 8th St Corridor
  - Halston Corridor
  - John Tod
  - McDonald Park
  - North Kamloops West
  - North Shore Town Centre
  - Schubert Drive
  - Tranquille Market
  - Tranquille South
- Pineview
- Rayleigh
- Rose Hill
- Sagebrush
- Southgate
- Thompson Rivers University (TRU)
- Tranquille
- Upper Sahali
- Valleyview
  - Orchard's Walk
- West End
  - College Heights
  - Guerin Creek
  - Hudson's Ridge
  - McIntosh Heights
  - Powers Addition
- Westsyde
  - Westmount
  - Oak Hills

=== Climate ===
The climate of Kamloops is semi-arid (Köppen climate classification BSk) due to its rain shadow location. Kamloops gets short winter cold snaps where temperatures can drop to around or below −30 °C (−22 °F) when Arctic air manages to cross the Rockies and Columbia Mountains into the Interior.

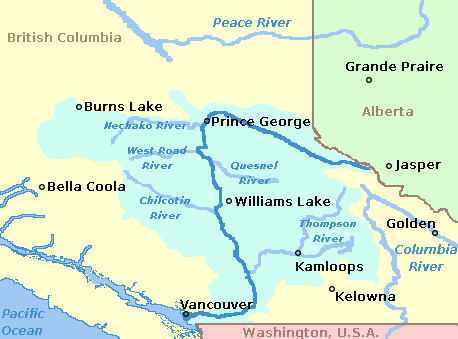
Kamloops in the Fraser River watershed

Kamloops has the third mildest winter of any non-coastal city in Canada, after Penticton and Kelowna. The coldest months are December and January, when the mean temperatures are −2.0 °C (28 °F) and −2.7 °C (27 °F). That average sharply increases with an average maximum temperature of 3.9 °C (39 °F) in February. Between November and January the area experiences abundant cloud cover due to a continual series of Pacific coastal Low Pressure systems crossing British Columbia, reducing the annual sunshine output, despite very sunny summers. The average number of days where the minimum temperatures drops below −10 °C (14 °F) per year is 19 as recorded by Environment Canada.The average number of days where the maximum temperature goes above 30 °C (86 °F) is 36, above 35 °C (95 °F) is 8 days.

Although Kamloops is above 50° north latitude, growing seasons are long, with hot periods every summer under dry and sunny weather. Daytime humidity often drops below 20% during dry periods, which allows for substantial nighttime cooling. Occasional summer thunderstorms can create dry-lightning conditions, sometimes igniting forest fires which the area is prone to.

Kamloops lies in the rain shadow leeward of the Coast Mountains and is biogeographically connected to similar semi-desert areas in the Okanagan region, and a much larger area covering the central/eastern portions of Washington, Oregon and intermontane areas of Nevada, Utah and Idaho in the US.

These areas of relatively similar climate have many distinctive native plants and animals in common, such as ponderosa pine (Pinus ponderosa), big sagebrush (Artemisia tridentata), prickly pear cactus (Opuntia fragilis in this case), rattlesnakes, black widow spiders and Lewis's woodpecker.

The highest temperature ever recorded in Kamloops was 47.3 °C (117 °F) on 29 June 2021, which was the fifth-highest reading recorded in Canada, and the highest recorded in any city of over 10,000 people, during the infamous 2021 Western North America heat wave. The lowest temperature ever recorded was −38.3 °C (−37 °F) on 16 and 18 January 1950.

Climate data for Kamloops Airport, 1991–2020 normals, extremes 1890–present (Note: Climate data was recorded in the city of Kamloops from January 1890 to December 1950, and at Kamloops Airport from January 1951 to present.)
Month	Jan	Feb	Mar	Apr	May	Jun	Jul	Aug	Sep	Oct	Nov	Dec	Year
Record high humidex	15.8	17.0	23.3	31.9	36.8	48.0	40.4	40.3	38.4	31.2	22.8	15.0	48.0
Record high °C (°F)	16.1 (61.0)	17.8 (64.0)	23.3 (73.9)	33.3 (91.9)	37.8 (100.0)	47.3 (117.1)	41.7 (107.1)	40.8 (105.4)	38.3 (100.9)	31.3 (88.3)	22.8 (73.0)	18.6 (65.5)	47.3 (117.1)
Mean daily maximum °C (°F)	0.4 (32.7)	3.9 (39.0)	10.7 (51.3)	16.5 (61.7)	22.0 (71.6)	25.1 (77.2)	29.3 (84.7)	28.8 (83.8)	22.8 (73.0)	13.6 (56.5)	5.8 (42.4)	1.0 (33.8)	15.0 (59.0)
Daily mean °C (°F)	−2.7 (27.1)	−0.2 (31.6)	5.2 (41.4)	9.9 (49.8)	15.0 (59.0)	18.4 (65.1)	21.9 (71.4)	21.3 (70.3)	16.0 (60.8)	8.6 (47.5)	2.3 (36.1)	−2.0 (28.4)	9.5 (49.1)
Mean daily minimum °C (°F)	−5.7 (21.7)	−4.3 (24.3)	−0.5 (31.1)	3.2 (37.8)	8.1 (46.6)	11.6 (52.9)	14.5 (58.1)	13.7 (56.7)	9.2 (48.6)	3.5 (38.3)	−1.1 (30.0)	−5.0 (23.0)	3.9 (39.0)
Record low °C (°F)	−38.3 (−36.9)	−32.8 (−27.0)	−26.1 (−15.0)	−10.6 (12.9)	−5.6 (21.9)	0.6 (33.1)	3.3 (37.9)	0.6 (33.1)	−3.9 (25.0)	−17.1 (1.2)	−30.0 (−22.0)	−36.1 (−33.0)	−38.3 (−36.9)
Record low wind chill	−42.0	−36.7	−33.9	−13.0	−5.2	0.0	0.0	0.0	−6.5	−23.2	−39.1	−45.1	−45.1
Average precipitation mm (inches)	21.1 (0.83)	12.4 (0.49)	12.8 (0.50)	14.2 (0.56)	27.3 (1.07)	37.4 (1.47)	31.4 (1.24)	23.7 (0.93)	29.4 (1.16)	19.4 (0.76)	23.3 (0.92)	25.4 (1.00)	277.6 (10.93)
Average rainfall mm (inches)	5.3 (0.21)	5.9 (0.23)	9.7 (0.38)	14.0 (0.55)	27.3 (1.07)	37.4 (1.47)	31.4 (1.24)	23.7 (0.93)	29.4 (1.16)	19.0 (0.75)	14.2 (0.56)	7.1 (0.28)	224.3 (8.83)
Average snowfall cm (inches)	18.7 (7.4)	8.0 (3.1)	3.5 (1.4)	0.2 (0.1)	0.0 (0.0)	0.0 (0.0)	0.0 (0.0)	0.0 (0.0)	0.0 (0.0)	0.3 (0.1)	10.9 (4.3)	21.9 (8.6)	63.5 (25.0)
Average precipitation days (≥ 0.2 mm)	9.7	7.2	6.8	6.2	10.2	10.7	8.4	8.0	7.6	9.0	10.0	11.7	105.6
Average rainy days (≥ 0.2 mm)	3.6	3.8	5.5	6.1	10.2	10.7	8.3	8.0	7.6	8.8	7.1	3.4	83.3
Average snowy days (≥ 0.2 cm)	7.6	4.1	1.9	0.3	0.0	0.0	0.0	0.0	0.0	0.3	3.9	9.3	27.4
Average relative humidity (%)	72.6	60.0	43.0	35.6	36.2	36.4	33.5	34.4	41.4	52.9	65.9	70.9	48.6
Mean monthly sunshine hours	55.2	95.6	165.3	202.8	251.6	252.0	303.4	289.5	223.3	130.9	63.7	46.6	2,079.8
Percentage possible sunshine	20.9	33.9	45.0	49.0	52.4	51.2	61.2	64.3	58.7	39.2	23.5	18.6	43.2
Source: Environment Canada

	Hottest summer Max.	Most days above 30 °C (86 °F)	Driest	Warmest spring	Fewest fog days	Most sunny days in warm months	Most growing degree days	Most days without precipitation
Rank among 100 largest Canadian cities	1st	1st	2nd (next to Whitehorse)	2nd (next to Chilliwack)	2nd (next to Penticton)	2nd (next to Portage la Prairie)	3rd (next to Windsor and St. Catharines)	3rd (next to Medicine Hat and Lethbridge)
Value	27.73 °C (81.9 °F)	35.9	272.9 mm (10.74 in)	10.03 °C (50.1 °F)	7.28	148.93	2308.61	258.12
Data is for Kamloops Airport (YKA), in the city of Kamloops, 5 NM (9.3 km; 5.8 mi) west northwest of the town.

== Demographics ==
Historical population
Year	Pop.	±%
1881	200	—
1891	1,500	+650.0%
1901	1,359	−9.4%
1911	3,772	+177.6%
1921	4,501	+19.3%
1931	6,167	+37.0%
1941	5,959	−3.4%
1951	8,099	+35.9%
1956	9,096	+12.3%
1961	10,076	+10.8%
1966	10,759	+6.8%
1971	26,168	+143.2%
1976	58,311	+122.8%
1981	64,048	+9.8%
1986	61,773	−3.6%
1991	67,057	+8.6%
1996	76,394	+13.9%
2001	77,281	+1.2%
2006	80,376	+4.0%
2011	85,678	+6.6%
2016	90,280	+5.4%
2021	97,902	+8.4%
Sources: Statistics Canada

In the 2021 Census of Population conducted by Statistics Canada, Kamloops had a population of 97,902 living in 39,914 of its 41,619 total private dwellings, a change of 8.4% from its 2016 population of 90,280. With a land area of 297.93 km^{2} (115.03 sq mi), it had a population density of 328.6/km^{2} (851.1/sq mi) in 2021.

At the census metropolitan area (CMA) level in the 2021 census, the Kamloops CMA had a population of 114,142 living in 47,102 of its 50,235 total private dwellings, a change of 10% from its 2016 population of 103,811. With a land area of 5,654.08 km^{2} (2,183.05 sq mi), it had a population density of 20.2/km^{2} (52.3/sq mi) in 2021.

=== Religious groups ===
Largest non-Christian religion in Kamloops CMA by census tract based on the 2021 census

Religion in the City of Kamloops (2021)
1. Irreligious (60.5%)
2. Christianity (33.6%)
3. Sikhism (2.10%)
4. Hinduism (1.10%)
5. Islam (0.90%)
6. Buddhism (0.50%)
7. Indigenous Spirituality (0.20%)
8. Judaism (0.10%)
9. Other religion (0.90%)

According to the 2021 census, religious groups in Kamloops included:

- irreligion (57,245; 60.5%)
- Christian (31,790; 33.6%)
- Sikh (2,005; 2.1%)
- Hindu (995; 1.1%)
- Muslim (890; 0.9%)
- Buddhist (440 persons or 0.5%)
- Indigenous spirituality (190; 0.2%)
- Jewish (85; 0.1%)
- Other religions (925; 1.0%)

Religious groups in the City of Kamloops (1991−2021)
Religious group	2021 Canadian census		2011 Canadian census		2001 Canadian census		1991 Canadian census	
Religious group	Pop.	%	Pop.	%	Pop.	%	Pop.	%
Irreligion	57,245	60.54%	39,840	47.58%	28,280	36.82%	18,700	28.19%
Christianity	31,790	33.62%	40,355	48.2%	45,950	59.82%	45,875	69.16%
Sikhism	2,005	2.12%	1,150	1.37%	1,340	1.74%	1,065	1.61%
Hinduism	995	1.05%	320	0.38%	170	0.22%	160	0.24%
Islam	890	0.94%	550	0.66%	150	0.2%	40	0.06%
Buddhism	440	0.47%	485	0.58%	450	0.59%	285	0.43%
Indigenous spirituality	190	0.2%	205	0.24%	215	0.28%	—N/a	—N/a
Judaism	85	0.09%	190	0.23%	90	0.12%	15	0.02%
Other	925	0.98%	640	0.76%	165	0.21%	190	0.29%
Total responses	94,560	96.59%	83,725	97.72%	76,815	99.4%	66,335	98.92%
Total population	97,902	100%	85,678	100%	77,281	100%	67,057	100%

=== Ethnicity ===
The most common ethnicities in Kamloops as per the 2021 census are English (28.8%), Scottish (22.8%), Irish (18%), German (16.6%), Canadian (13.5%), French (9.8%), Ukrainian (7.1%), Italian (5.6%), Dutch (4.9%), and Norwegian (4.3%).

Largest ethnic origin in Kamloops CMA by census tract based on the 2021 census

Panethnic groups in the City of Kamloops (2001−2021)
Panethnic group	2021		2016		2011		2006		2001	
Panethnic group	Pop.	%	Pop.	%	Pop.	%	Pop.	%	Pop.	%
European (Note: Statistic includes all persons that did not make up part of a visible minority or an indigenous identity.)	74,430	78.71%	71,765	82.17%	71,760	85.71%	69,250	87.17%	68,305	88.92%
Indigenous	9,885	10.45%	8,600	9.85%	6,245	7.46%	5,165	6.5%	3,965	5.16%
South Asian	4,260	4.51%	2,455	2.81%	1,970	2.35%	1,540	1.94%	1,720	2.24%
East Asian (Note: Statistic includes total responses of "Chinese", "Korean", and "Japanese" under visible minority section on census.)	2,420	2.56%	2,270	2.6%	2,135	2.55%	1,940	2.44%	1,810	2.36%
Southeast Asian (Note: Statistic includes total responses of "Filipino" and "Southeast Asian" under visible minority section on census.)	1,410	1.49%	910	1.04%	740	0.88%	840	1.06%	450	0.59%
African	985	1.04%	550	0.63%	235	0.28%	215	0.27%	335	0.44%
Latin American	490	0.52%	310	0.35%	135	0.16%	195	0.25%	120	0.16%
Middle Eastern (Note: Statistic includes total responses of "West Asian" and "Arab" under visible minority section on census.)	320	0.34%	250	0.29%	355	0.42%	120	0.15%	65	0.08%
Other/multiracial (Note: Statistic includes total responses of "Visible minority, n.i.e." and "Multiple visible minorities" under visible minority section on census.)	370	0.39%	230	0.26%	145	0.17%	165	0.21%	50	0.07%
Total responses	94,560	96.59%	87,340	96.74%	83,725	97.72%	79,445	98.84%	76,815	99.4%
Total population	97,902	100%	90,280	100%	85,678	100%	80,376	100%	77,281	100%
Note: Totals greater than 100% due to multiple origin responses

==== Chinese Canadians ====
Kamloops historically had a Chinatown on Victoria Street where most ethnic Chinese lived. John Stewart of the Kamloops Museum and Archives stated it was not a "true Chinatown". It was established by Chinese immigrants by 1887, and by 1890 the community had up to 400 Chinese. Stewart said this was an "amazingly large" population for the rural area. By the 1890s, about 33% of Kamloops were ethnic Chinese; they worked primarily on construction of the Canadian Pacific Railway.

Economic changes in Kamloops resulted in many Chinese seeking work elsewhere. In addition, there were two fires in 1892 and 1893, and a 1911–1914 demolition that dismantled the Chinatown. Peter Wing, the first ethnic Chinese mayor in North America, was elected in 1966 and served three terms as the Mayor of Kamloops.

In the 1880s the Kamloops' Chinese Cemetery was founded in Kamloops, the only one in the province dedicated to Chinese pioneers. It is one of the largest cemeteries in the province, but the last interment was made there in the 1960s.

In 2013 the provincial government announced it would begin a consultation process to discuss wording of a formal apology to Chinese in B.C. for past wrongs. Joe Leong, president of the Kamloops Chinese Cultural Association, said he believed that the province should build a museum to honour Chinese history in the province, as a way to recognize the contributions of the people. As Kamloops had the only cemetery dedicated to the Chinese pioneers, he felt this city would be an appropriate site for the museum.

== Economy ==
Royal Inland Hospital

Thompson Rivers University

Kamloops' economy includes healthcare, tourism, education, transportation, and natural resource extraction industries.

The Royal Inland Hospital (RIH) is the city's largest employer. RIH is the region's acute care and health facility and is one of two tertiary referral hospitals in the Southern Interior with 239 acute beds and an additional 20 more beds upon completion of the expansion in 2016.

Thompson Rivers University (TRU) serves a student body of 25,754 including a diverse international contingent mainly from Asian countries. Thompson Rivers University, Open Learning (TRU-OL) is the biggest distance education provider in British Columbia and one of the biggest in Canada.

Heavy industries in the Kamloops area include primary resource processing such as Domtar Kamloops Pulp Mill, Tolko-Heffley Creek Plywood and Veneer, Couer Mining's New Afton Mine, and Teck's Highland Valley Copper Mine (in Logan Lake).

Four major highways join in Kamloops: the BC Highway 1 (Trans-Canada Highway), the Coquihalla Highway (BC Highway 5 south of the city), the Yellowhead Highway (BC Highway 5 north of the city) and BC Highway 97, making it a transportation hub and a place which attracts business. There are over 50 trucking and transport companies located in Kamloops that ship across Canada and into the United States. Both the Canadian Pacific Railway and the Canadian National Railway service Kamloops with both lines running through the city.

=== Tourism ===
Kamloops welcomed 1.8 million visitors in 2017, a 9% increase from 2015 (1.64 million).

Tourism's economic ROI is immense. A$1.8 million destination marketing budget returned $449 million in economic benefit in 2017.The annual Direct Visitor Expenditure is estimated at $270 million, a 19% increase from 2015 ($227 million). Further, the total estimated tourism economic impact was $449 million in 2017, a 32.4% increase from 2015 ($339 million).

Tourism generates many types of income for the region, including business income, wage earnings, share earnings, rates and levies. Conservation springs from industry-wide support for management, research and education initiatives that benefit everyone through responsible tourism management.

Kamloops has over 50 accommodation choices from major hotels to bed and breakfasts. Accommodation occupancy rates were 61.5% in 2017, up 2.6% from 2016.

== Arts and culture ==
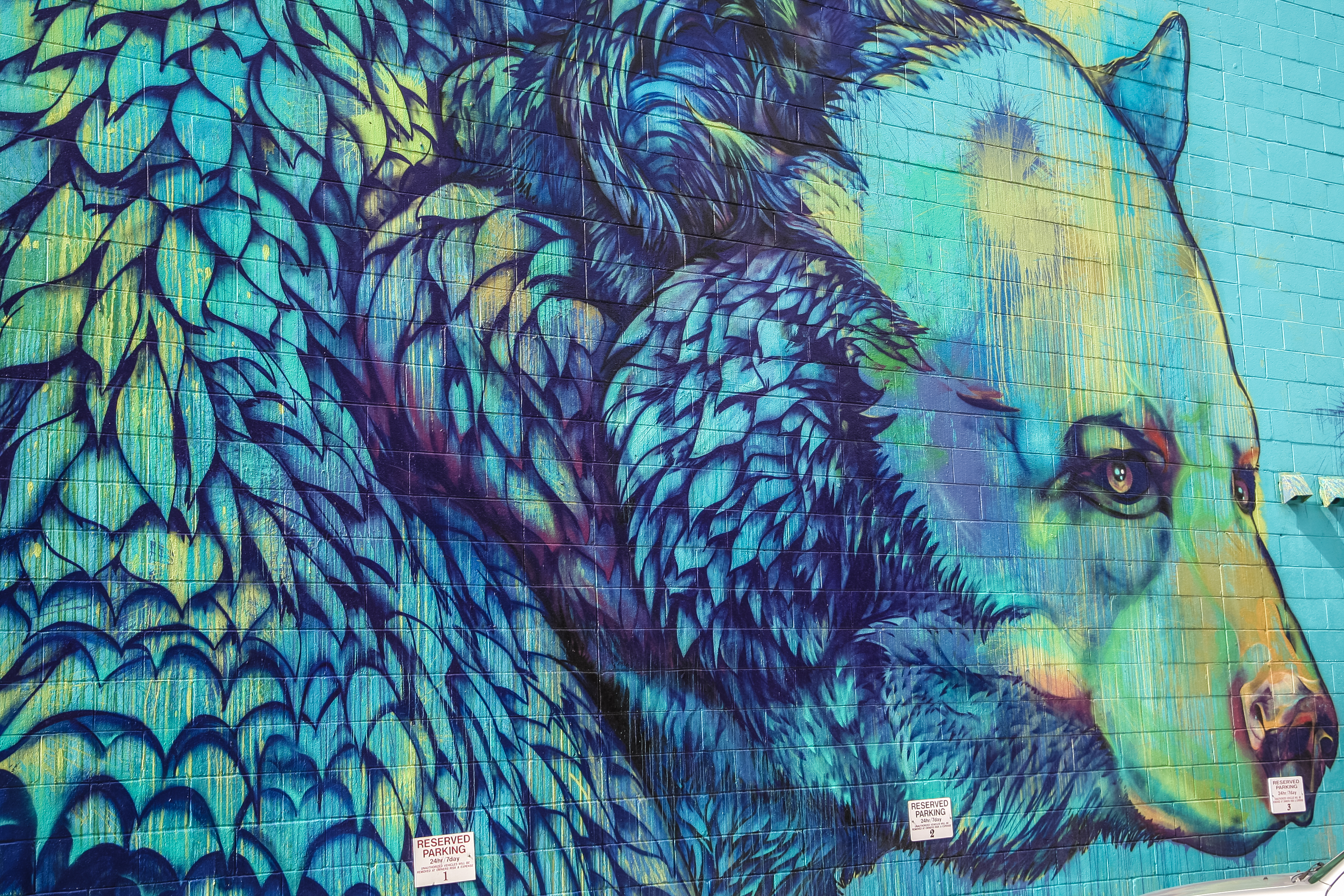
Alley art in downtown Kamloops

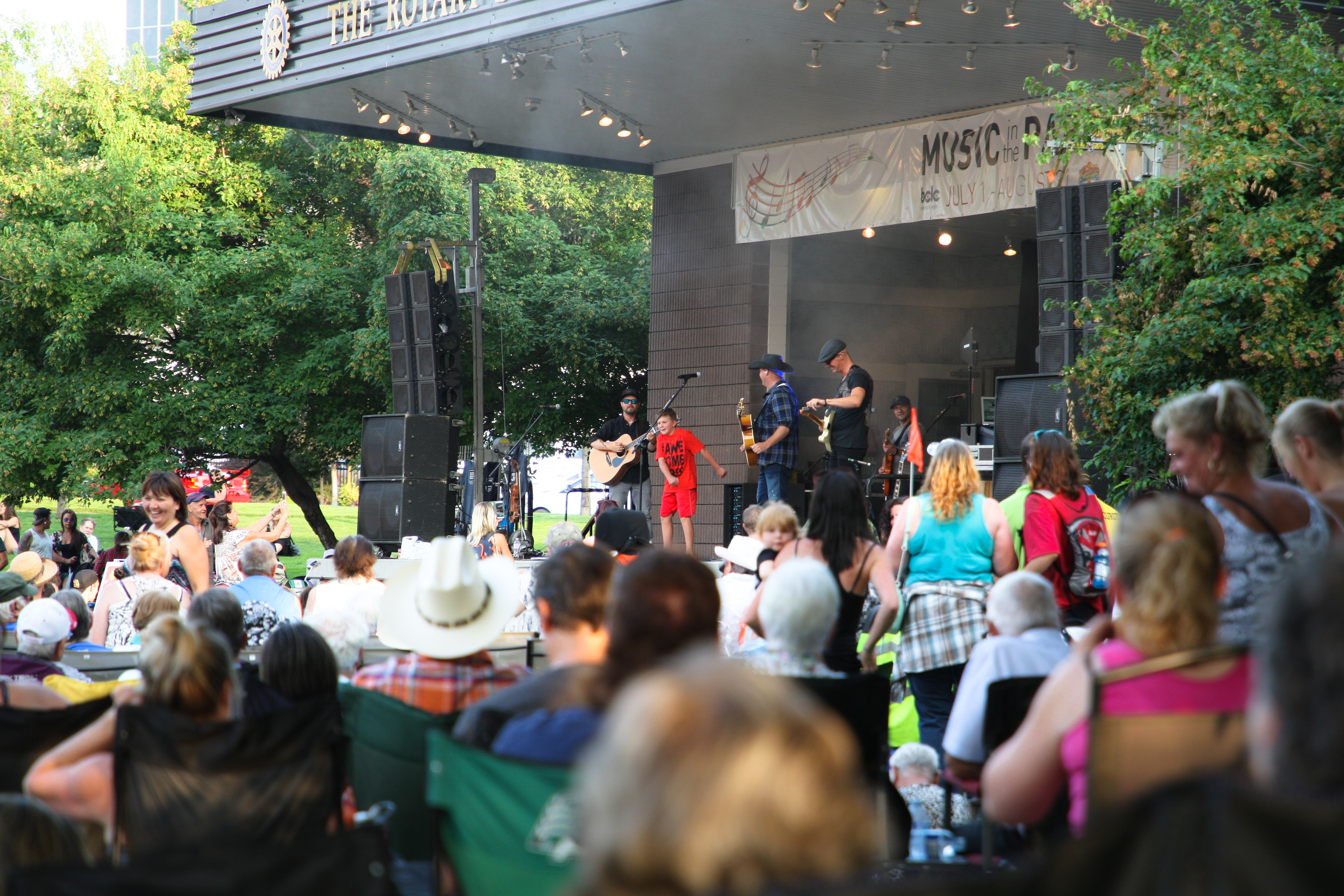
Music in the Park at Riverside Park

Kamloops culture has grown in recent years to celebrate local talent that includes: culinary arts, sports, live entertainment, and fine art.

Kamloops hosts a range of cultural events year-round including:

- Kamloops Wine Festival: This annual festival is a fundraiser for the Kamloops Art Gallery.
- Kamloops Film Festival: Since 1997, this festival has grown to celebrate international films at Paramount Theatre for ten days in March.
- River Beaver Classic: This annual, mountain biking festival hosts four events over one weekend in April with all money raised going to local trail maintenance.
- Brewloops Brewloops is a non-profit, beer, food, and bike festival that celebrates Kamloops culture with block parties on The Shore and Downtown throughout the year.
- Kamloops International Buskers Festival: This four-day festival takes place throughout Riverside Park and showcases professional buskers from around the globe.
- Hot Nite in the City Show 'n' Shine: This weekend-long event takes place every August downtown and showcases Street Rods, Customs, American Muscle, Sport-compact, Electric Vehicles and more.
- Kamloops Rotary Ribfest: Western Canada's largest rib festival, Ribfest takes place every August at Riverside Park. By 2018, Kamloops Rotary had raised over $500,000 for local charities.
- Salute to the Sockeye Festival: This festival celebrates the return of sockeye salmon to the Adams River at Tsútswecw Provincial Park from the end of September through mid-October each year.
- Interior Wellness Festival: Since 2008, this event has promoted healthy living in BC including workshops with yogis, authors, and business experts.
- Kamloops Comedy Fest: Canadian comedians take over the microphone for a weekend each October during Kamloops Comedy Fest.
- Words Alive Kamloops: Formerly the Kamloops Writers Festival, this annual event features Canadian authors showcasing their work through public readings and events, as well as conducting workshops on a variety of topics.

=== Performing and fine arts ===
Kamloops is home to many galleries including nationally recognized Kamloops Art Gallery, Secwepemc Museum and Heritage Park; the Kamloops Museum and Archives, the Kamloops Symphony Orchestra, and Western Canada Theatre.

There are 29 outdoor murals – the Back Alley Art Gallery- throughout downtown Kamloops that the Kamloops Central Business Improvement Association has spearheaded since the 2000s. Artists that have contributed to this project include Janice Gurney.

Project X Theatre, an outdoor theatre festival located in Kamloops. The company creates a summer outdoor theatre festival in Prince Charles Park, just east of Downtown Kamloops. Established in 2006, Project X Theatre originally produced productions of Shakespeare, however, recently the company has shifted over to more family friendly shows.

The Western Canada Theatre is a professional theatre company located in Kamloops. The company manages and performs in two spaces: the 681-seat Sagebrush Theatre and the 150-seat Pavilion Theatre.

== Attractions ==
Popular attractions include: the Adams River Sockeye Salmon Run; Kamloops Bike Ranch; BC Wildlife Park; Kamloops Heritage Railway; Kamloops Wine Trail; Secwepemc Museum, and Tranquille Sanatorium

=== Food and drink ===
Since 2007, Chefs in the City has been established as a "celebration of culinary arts, fine wine and beer from Kamloops and the surrounding region." This annual event is presented by the Rotary Club of Kamloops and had raised over $400,000 by 2020.

Kamloops is a wine region with a climate suitable for growing grapes. It is home to four award-winning wineries: Harper's Trail, Monte Creek Ranch, Privato and Sagewood. Kamloops has over 120 acres under vine. The top grapes planted by local wineries are Riesling, Chardonnay, pinot gris, pinot noir, Cabernet Franc, Marechal Foch and Marquette.

Since 1998, the Kamloops Wine Festival has taken place in the spring as a fundraiser to support the Kamloops Art Gallery. The Kamloops Wine Festival had raised over $200,000 by 2018. Since 2012, four wineries have been established in the Thompson Valley wine region

Since 2010, five micro-breweries have opened up in Kamloops as well as craft distilleries. In 2014, Brewloops Beer Festival was established as a non-profit organization that promotes Kamloops culture across the city throughout the year. Brewloops celebrates BC craft beer, music, and entertainment with the wider Kamloops community and had donated $27,000 to community groups by 2018. Bands that have performed at Brewloops include: Delhi 2 Dublin, Yukon Blonde, and at Mission Dolores.

=== Recreation ===
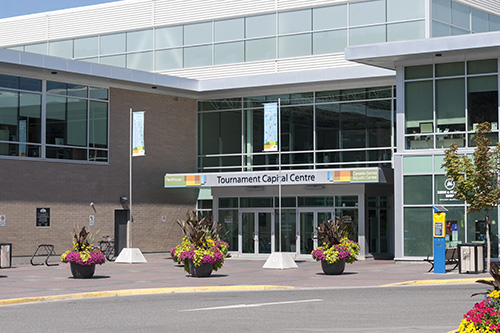
Tournament Capital Centre

Kamloops is an outdoor mecca for activities like hiking and mountain biking with an extensive trail network for year-round adventure. Multiple nearby lakes offer paddling, kayaking and fishing.

Known as the Tournament Capital of Canada, Kamloops has hosted many tournaments and is home to a range of professional athletes from many sports. Kamloops has the Kamloops Sports Hall of Fame, which includes 2008 Summer Olympics bronze medallist Dylan Armstrong and the National Finalist Roma's soccer team.

==== Fishing ====
With 100 lakes within an hour's drive, Kamloops has some of the best freshwater fishing in North America. Every year, the Freshwater Fisheries Society of BC stocks lakes in the Thompson-Nicola region with roughly 1,000,000 fish including rainbow trout, brook trout, and kokanee salmon. Professional guides and fishermen are found in this region.

==== Mountain biking ====
Kamloops' extensive trail network and desert-like climate creates conditions for year-round mountain biking across the city. Popular parks include the Kamloops Bike Ranch, Pineview Valley; Lac du Bois Grasslands Protected Area, and Kenna Cartwright Park. Two time UCI Mountain Bike & Trials World Championships – Women's cross-country (2011 and 2014), gold at the 2014 Commonwealth Games and 2016 Summer Olympics bronze medallist Catharine Pendrel lives and trains in Kamloops. Kamloops is home to world-famous mountain bikers such as freeride pioneers and Mountain Bike Hall of Fame members Wade Simmons, Brett Tippie (also a former Canadian National Team member for snowboard cross and giant slalom), and Richie Schley. Freeriders Matt Hunter, and Graham Agassiz also live in Kamloops. Kamloops was featured in the first mountain bike film by Greg Stump, Pulp Traction, and later the first three Kranked films, which starred the original Fro Riders, Tippie, Simmons and Schley.

Ongoing trail maintenance has been spearheaded by local organizations such as the Kamloops Bike Riders Association, Kamloops Performance Cycling Centre, and Dirt Chix Kamloops.

==== Golf ====
Kamloops has one of highest number of golf courses (13) per capita in Canada and boasts one of Canada's most diverse golf landscapes. Golfers enjoy three seasons of golf due to the dry and hot climate of the area. Several of the local golf courses have been designed by famous golf architects such as Robert Trent Jones, Graham Cooke, and Tom McBroom.

The 13 courses include: Tobiano Golf Course; The Dunes, Talking Rock Golf Course; Pineridge Golf Course; Rivershore Estates; Big Horn Golf & Country Club; Kamloops Golf & Country Club; Sun Peaks Golf; Eagle Point Golf Course; Mount Paul Golf Course, and Chinook Cove Golf.

==== Skiing ====
Sun Peaks Resort is a nearby ski and snowboard hill. Olympic medallist skier Nancy Greene Raine is director of skiing at Sun Peaks and the former chancellor of Thompson Rivers University. The Overlander Ski Club runs the Stake Lake cross country ski area with 50 km (31 mi) of trails.

Lacrosse teams include the Thompson Okanagan Junior Lacrosse League's Kamloops Junior B Venom, as well as the junior ice hockey team the Kamloops Storm. Also calling Kamloops home is the Canadian Junior Football League's Kamloops Broncos, and Pacific Coast Soccer League's Kamloops Excel, both of whom play at Hillside Stadium.

==== Other recreation ====
The Kamloops Rotary Skatepark at McArthur Island Park is one of Canada's largest skateboard parks. Also located at McArthur Island Park is NorBrock Stadium, the McArthur Island Sports and Events Centre and the McArthur Island Curling Club. The city boasts 82 parks which are great for hiking, including Kenna Cartwright Park, the largest municipal park in British Columbia.

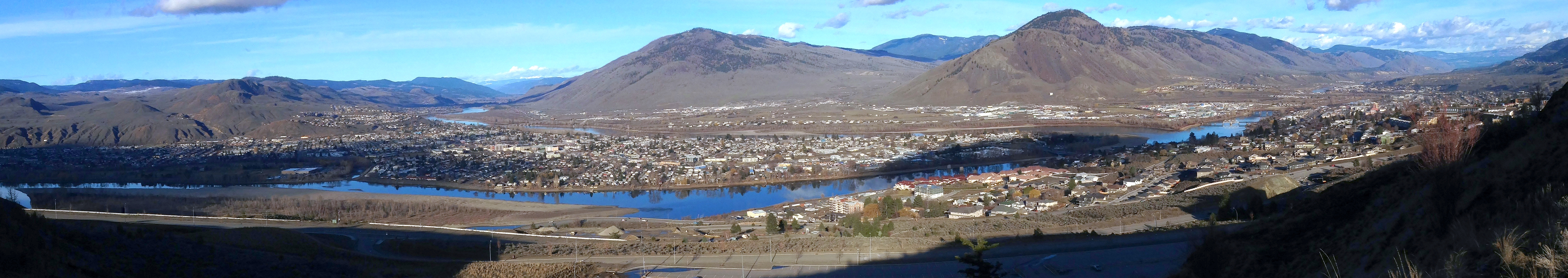
Kamloops panorama

== Sports ==
=== Hockey ===
Kamloops is home to the Western Hockey League's Kamloops Blazers who play at the Sandman Centre. Alumni of the Kamloops Blazers include Mark Recchi, Jarome Iginla, Darryl Sydor, Nolan Baumgartner, Shane Doan, Scott Niedermayer, Rudy Poeschek and Darcy Tucker (Recchi, Doan, Iginla, and Sydor are now part-owners of the club). Two-time champion coach Ken Hitchcock would later win the Stanley Cup with the Dallas Stars.

On 6 February 2016, Kamloops hosted Hockey Day in Canada with Ron MacLean and Don Cherry.

=== Baseball ===
Kamloops is the home of the West Coast League's Kamloops NorthPaws who play at NorBrock Stadium.

=== Sports tournaments ===
Kamloops hosted the 1993 Canada Summer Games. It co-hosted (with Vancouver and Kelowna) the IIHF World Junior Championship from 26 December 2005 to 5 January 2006. It hosted the 2006 BC Summer Games and 2018 BC Winter Games. In the summer of 2008, Kamloops, and its modern facility the Tournament Capital Centre played host to the U15 boys and girls Basketball National Championship.

Kamloops hosted the World Masters Indoor Championships in March 2010.

Kamloops hosted the 2011 Western Canada Summer Games.

Kamloops hosted the 2014 Tim Hortons Brier (The Canadian Men's Curling Championships).

Kamloops hosted the 2014 edition of the 4 Nations Cup.

Kamloops hosted the 2016 IIHF Women's World Championship at both Sandman Centre and the MacArthur Island Sports and Event Centre.

== Government ==
Elections into the municipality in Kamloops are held with the rest of the province every four years.

Provincially, Kamloops is considered to be bellwether, having voted for the governing party in every provincial election since the introduction of parties to British Columbian elections, until 2017. By contrast, Kamloops has regularly voted against the party in power federally until the 2006 Federal election. Kamloops is represented in two provincial ridings – Kamloops-South Thompson and Kamloops-North Thompson – and two federal ridings – Kamloops—Thompson—Nicola and Kamloops—Shuswap—Central Rockies.

- Mayor – Reid Hamer-Jackson, 2022
- Members of the Legislative Assembly:
  - Peter Milobar, Kamloops-Centre
  - Ward Stamer, Kamloops-North Thompson

Federal members of parliament:

- Mel Arnold (2025–present) Conservative Party of Canada.
- Frank Caputo (2021–present) Conservative Party of Canada
- Cathy McLeod (2008–2021) Conservative Party of Canada
- Betty Hinton (2000–2008) Canadian Alliance and Conservative Party of Canada
- Nelson Riis (1980–2000) New Democratic Party
- Don Cameron (1979–1980) Progressive Conservative Party of Canada
- Leonard Marchand (1968–1979) Liberal Party of Canada

== Infrastructure ==
=== Transportation ===
Kamloops is located at the crossroads of the Coquihalla Highway, Yellowhead Highway, and Trans-Canada Highway and is a transportation hub in the region.

The Canadian Pacific (CPR) and Canadian National (CNR) mainline routes connect Vancouver in the west with Kamloops. The two railways diverge; CNR to the north and CPR and east, continuing to the rest of Canada. Kamloops North station is served two times per week (in each direction) by Via Rail's Canadian.

The Rocky Mountaineer and the Kamloops Heritage Railway both use the Kamloops station.

Kamloops is home to Kamloops Airport (YKA). Airlines flying to Kamloops include: Air Canada Express, WestJet Encore, Canadian North, and Central Mountain Air, as well as three cargo airlines. Vancouver and Calgary are primary routes for passenger service to this regional airport. In 2018, Air Canada Rouge launched non-stop seasonal service from Kamloops to Toronto.

Greyhound Canada previously connected Kamloops with Vancouver, Edmonton and Calgary, with service ending at the end of October 2018. After Greyhound's departure, several companies stepped in and commenced intercity service. Ebus and Rider Express both provide service to Vancouver and in between cities and towns, with Ebus connecting to other Interior cities like Kelowna and Vernon, and Rider Express continuing east to Calgary.

Local bus service is provided by Kamloops Transit System and funded through BC Transit with 14 routes across the Kamloops area that are operated by contractor First Student Canada. In 2018, the City of Kamloops partnered with the Tk'emlúps te Secwépemc to expand its services on Tk'emlups te Secwepemc land for Route 18: Mount Paul.

== Education ==
=== Residential School ===
The Kamloops Indian Residential School, part of the Canadian Indian residential school system opened in 1893 and ran until 1977.

=== K-12 ===
Public schools in Kamloops and adjacent communities are run by School District 73 Kamloops/Thompson.

Private schools include Kamloops Christian School, Our Lady of Perpetual Help School (Catholic), and St. Ann's Academy (Catholic).

The Conseil scolaire francophone de la Colombie-Britannique operates école Collines-d'or, a Francophone primary school.

=== Post-secondary ===
Thompson Rivers University offers a range of undergraduate and graduate degrees as well as certificate and diploma programs. It has satellite campuses in:

- Clearwater
- Barriere
- Chase
- Williams Lake
- 100 Mile House
- Cache Creek
- Ashcroft
- Lillooet

Thompson Rivers University also has an open-learning division. Thompson Rivers University, Open Learning (TRU-OL) is the biggest distance and online education provider in British Columbia and one of the biggest in Canada. The Thompson Rivers University WolfPack are the athletic teams that represent Thompson Rivers University.

Thompson Career College and Sprott Shaw College are private post-secondary institutions with campuses in Kamloops.

== Media ==
The city's main daily newspaper was The Kamloops Daily News which ceased publication in 2014. The city was also home to Kamloops This Week, a free newspaper which ceased publication in 2023.

== Notable people ==
Below is a list of people who are from Kamloops, or who lived there for an extended period.

=== Historical figures ===
- Robert Barton, flying ace of the Second World War
- Edward Bellew, recipient of the Victoria Cross.
- Jim Chamberlin, aerodynamicist, who contributed to the design of the Canadian Avro Arrow; NASA's Project Mercury, Project Gemini and the Apollo program.
- Kanao Inouye, the notorious "Kamloops Kid", the first of the two Canadians ever convicted of war crimes.
- Allan McLean, son of Donald McLean and leader of the outlaw gang known as the Wild McLean Boys.
- Donald McLean, former Chief Trader of Fort Kamloops and one of the casualties of the Chilcotin War.
- Frank Robert Miller, former deputy minister of the National Defence.
- Chief Nicola, conjoint chief of the Nicolas and the Kamloops Secwepemc during the fur trade and gold rush eras.
- Johnny Ussher, settler, provincial magistrate and gold commissioner (killed by Allan McLean).
- Mark Sweeten Wade, medical doctor, newspaperman and historian.

=== Politicians ===
- Jack Davis, politician who was elected to both the Parliament of Canada and Legislative Assembly of British Columbia.
- Jodie Emery – marijuana activist and politician.
- John L. Frazer, politician: member of the House of Commons of Canada from 1993 to 1997.
- Davie Fulton, politician: member of the Canadian House of Commons from 1945 to 1963, and 1965 to 1968. Son of Frederick John Fulton.
- Frederick John Fulton, British born politician and lawyer, father of Davie Fulton.
- Phil Gaglardi, aka Flying Phil, former Provincial Minister of Highways and Mayor of the city.
- Leonard Marchand, QPC, CM, the first person of First Nations ethnicity to serve in the federal cabinet and the first Status Indian to serve as a member of parliament.
- Nelson Riis, former Kamloops Teacher, Professor, alderman and Director of the Thompson-Nicola Regional District, longtime federal MP for Kamloops.
- Peter Wing, North America's first elected mayor of Chinese descent, elected in 1966 and served three terms in Kamloops.

=== Athletes ===
- Graham Agassiz, freeride mountain biker, bronze medal at Red Bull Rampage 2015.
- Dylan Armstrong, Olympic shot putter who finished 4th in the 2008 Olympics but subsequently was awarded the bronze medal in 2015 after the 3rd place putter Andrei Mikhnevich from Belarus tested positive for drugs post 2008 Olympics.
- Don Ashby, former National Hockey League (NHL) ice hockey player.
- Murray Baron, former NHL ice hockey player.
- Mitch Berger, former National Football League (NFL) player.
- Rick Boh, former NHL ice hockey player.
- Corryn Brown, Canadian curler, skip of the 2013 Canadian Junior Curling Championships winning rink, 2012 Winter Youth Olympics bronze medallist.
- Jim Cotter, Canadian curler, 2013 Olympic Trials runner up, 2014 Tim Hortons Brier silver medallist.
- Craig Endean, former NHL ice hockey player.
- Todd Esselmont, ice and roller hockey player.
- Erin Gammel, swimmer who competed at the 2004 Summer Olympics.
- Stu Grimson, former NHL ice hockey player.
- Don Hay, former NHL head coach.
- Jessica Hewitt, short track speed skater, silver medallist at the 2014 Sochi Olympics.
- Joe Hicketts, 2015 World Junior Ice Hockey Champion, Detroit Red Wings defenceman.
- Ethan Katzberg, track & field athlete, 2023 Hammer Throw World Champion and Canadian Record holder
- Murray Kennett, is a former World Hockey Association (WHA) ice hockey player.
- Doug Lidster, former NHL ice hockey player.
- John Ludvig, professional ice hockey player
- Bert Marshall, former NHL ice hockey player.
- Spencer McLennan, Former Canadian Football League (CFL) player.
- Don Moen, Former CFL football player.
- Josie Morrison, Canadian speedskater, 2018 Winter Olympian.
- Bob Mowat, former WHA ice hockey player.
- Brendon Nash, former NHL ice hockey player.
- Riley Nash, former NHL hockey player.
- Shane Niemi, competitive sprinter.
- Kelly Olynyk, NBA and Canada international basketball player.
- Paul Osbaldiston, former CFL football player.
- Catharine Pendrel, cross country mountain biker, 2016 Olympic bronze medalist, 2011 and 2014 World Champion.
- Rudy Poeschek, former NHL player.
- Kevin Powell, former CFL football player.
- Nancy Greene Raine, named Canada's Athlete of the Century in 1999, Olympic skier who won gold for Canada in 1968, and 13 World Cups (the Canadian record) for a total of 17 Canadian Title Championships.
- Mark Recchi, former NHL ice hockey player, three time Stanley Cup champion (1991, 2006, 2011), and member of the Hockey Hall of Fame
- Justin Ring, former CFL football player
- Peter Soberlak, former American Hockey League (AHL) professional ice hockey player.
- Logan Stankoven, Carolina Hurricanes player, former captain of the Kamloops Blazers, and 2022 CHL Player of the Year.
- Dave Vankoughnett, former CFL football player.
- Tim Watters, former NHL ice hockey player.

=== Arts, culture and media ===
- Benjamin Ayres, actor, born in Kamloops.
- Dan Bremnes, Christian musician, born in Kamloops.
- Darril Fosty, award winning writer, raised in Kamloops.
- Steven Galloway, novelist, was raised in Kamloops.
- Elise Gatien, actress.
- Boris Karloff, actor, joined the Jeanne Russell theatre company in Kamloops in September 1911.
- Spencer Lord, actor
- Chris Masuak, punk rock singer-songwriter, inducted into the ARIA Hall of Fame, born in Kamloops – lived in Brocklehurst (North Kamloops) in the 1960s. Now resides in Spain.
- John Pozer, award-winning filmmaker.
- Robert W. Service, poet and writer known for his ballads depicting the Klondike Gold Rush of 1897, he worked at Kamloops branch of the Canadian Bank of Commerce from July to December 1904 before being transferred to Whitehorse.
- Michael Shanks, actor, born in Vancouver, but grew up in Kamloops.
- Hudson Williams, actor known for Heated Rivalry.
- Lawrence Paul Yuxweluptun, First Nations painter.

=== Other notable people ===
- Nadine Caron, first female First Nations surgeon.
- Andrew Collier, Commander of the Royal Canadian Navy.
- Vivian Dowding, leading birth control activist.
- Mildred Gottfriedson, first First Nations individual inducted into the Order of Canada and founding member of the B.C. Native Women's Society.
- Lesra Martin, resident lawyer who helped with Rubin "The Hurricane" Carter's prison release.

== Planetary nomenclature ==
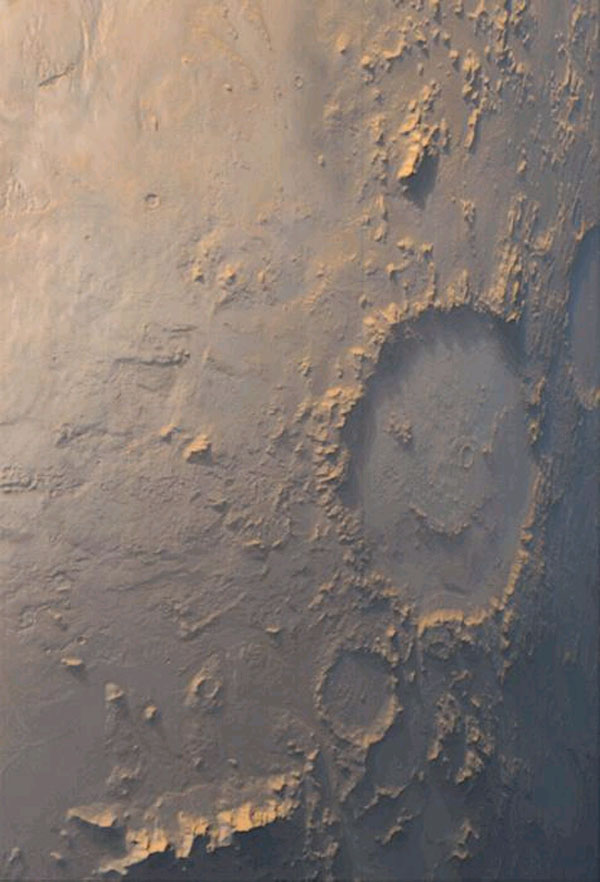
Kamloops crater on Mars

The city's name has been given to a crater on the surface of Mars. Crater Kamloops was officially adopted by the International Astronomical Union's Working Group for Planetary System Nomenclature (IAU/WGPSN) in 1991. The crater lies at 53.8° south latitude and 32.6° west longitude, with a diameter of 65 km (40 mi).

== Sister cities ==
- Uji, Kyoto Prefecture, Japan
- Bacolod, Negros Occidental, Philippines

== In popular culture ==
Kamloops and surrounding areas have been used for various Hollywood films such as An Unfinished Life, The A Team, 2012, The Pledge, Shooter, Firewall, The Sisterhood of the Travelling Pants, Monster Trucks, and various others.

"The Eye of Jupiter", the eleventh episode of the third season of Battlestar Galactica was filmed in Kamloops in 2006.

In 2018, Kamloops was a filming location for the Netflix series Lost in Space and a filming location for Jurassic World: Dominion in 2020.

== See also ==
- List of place names in Canada of Indigenous origin
- Kamloops Indian Residential School
- Kamloops Wawa
