= Aberdeen, British Columbia =

Aberdeen, British Columbia may refer to:

- Aberdeen, Abbotsford, a neighbourhood in Abbotsford, British Columbia
- Aberdeen, Kamloops, a neighbourhood in Kamloops, British Columbia
