= Knutsford, British Columbia =

Knutsford is an unincorporated community directly south of Kamloops, British Columbia, Canada. The most northern end is located within Kamloops city limits while the rest lies outside Kamloops. The area features rolling hills and grasslands with scattered groves of trees. Many small fishing lakes are also in the area. Hay and cattle grazing are the main sources of income for most of the area's ranchers.

== See also ==
- Knutsford, Kamloops
