= Knutsford (disambiguation) =

Knutsford is a market town in Cheshire, England.

Knutsford may also refer to the following, all of which are named after Knutsford, Cheshire:

- Knutsford (UK Parliament constituency), former constituency in Cheshire
- Knutsford, Kamloops, British Columbia
- Knutsford, Prince Edward Island
- Knutsford Terrace, Hong Kong
