= Kamloops This Week =

Canadian newspaper

- Type: Twice-weekly newspaper
- Owner: Aberdeen Publishing Group
- Publisher: Robert Doull
- Editor: Christopher Foulds
- Founded: 1988
- Ceased publication: Oct. 25, 2023
- Language: English
- Headquarters: Kamloops, British Columbia, Canada
- Circulation: 30,638 (as of 2022)
- Website: kamloopsthisweek.com

Kamloops This Week was a local newspaper in Kamloops, British Columbia from 1988 to 2023.

In October 2023, the paper announced it will print its final issue on Oct. 25.

== Awards ==
In 2014, KTW was named best community newspaper in Canada and in 2014 and 2015, KTW was named best community newspaper in B.C./Yukon.

The paper was named a finalist of the 2022 Michener Award, Canada's highest journalism honor. KTW has also won five Webster Awards (B.C.'s highest journalism honor) and has been a Webster finalist numerous times. In addition, KTW has taken home dozens of BC/Yukon Community Newsmedia (known as the Ma Murrays) and Canadian Community Newspaper Association awards.

== See also ==
- List of newspapers in Canada
