= Janice Gurney =

Canadian contemporary artist (born 1949)

Janice Gurney (born 1949) is a Canadian contemporary artist born in Winnipeg, Manitoba. She graduated University of Manitoba in 1973 with a Bachelor of Fine Arts Honours degree and later received a Master of Visual Studies degree from University of Toronto in 2007 with a collaborative degree in Book History and Print Culture. She went on to get a PhD in Art and Visual Culture at Western University in 2012.

Gurney's work has been featured in solo and group exhibitions across Canada. Notable collections which have featured her art include: the National Gallery of Canada, the Art Gallery of Ontario, the Winnipeg Art Gallery, and Museum London. In her work, Gurney explores abstract concepts of human connection, meditation, and isolation using post-modernist art, collage, and visual meditation as methods of inspiration.

== Career and life ==
Janice Gurney was born 1949, in Winnipeg Manitoba. She pursued visual arts throughout her post-secondary and graduate studies, attending University of Manitoba for a Fine Arts Degree, University of Toronto for a master's degree in Visual Studies, and University of Western Ontario for a PhD in Art and Visual Culture.

She began exhibiting her work in 1981, with a solo exhibition called The Battle of the Somme, which was shown at the Anna Leonowens Gallery in Halifax and YYZ in Toronto. Her works have been exhibited in galleries across Canada including: the University of Toronto Art Centre, the Thielsen Gallery, The Wynick/Tuck Gallery, Museum London, and the Winnipeg Art Gallery. Working for almost forty years across the country, she has become a well-established Canadian artist.

Between 2007 and 2012 she worked in the faculty of Fine Art at the University of Western Ontario, and has since celebrated the department of Visual Arts’ 50th anniversary at Western. In particular, her experience pursuing a PhD at Western University pushed her towards the complex nature of her art which she has developed over the years.

In 2015, she orchestrated a panel discussion on appropriation in Canadian and American art, titled “In and Out of History: Appropriation in Canadian and American Art,” for the Toronto conference “This is Paradise: Art and Artists in Toronto.”

Outside of the exhibition space, Gurney has multiple publications written about her work.

Janice Gurney: All The Spaces (McIntosh Gallery, 2016) which was edited by Julian Jason Haladyn, includes ideas surrounding Gurney's work on the Marcus Aurelius meditation, a collection of photographs which represents these meditations visually.

Janice Gurney: Sum Over Histories includes writings by Shirley Madill, Suzanne Gilles, Gordon Lebredt, Richard Rhodes, and Barbara Fischer. Janice Gurney: Sum Over Histories, analyzes some of Gurney's best and most renowned works, discussing the intentions around her work, the themes and contexts, and explores some of her other career highlights.

== Postmodernism and style ==
As a contemporary artist, Gurney's connection to postmodernism is evident through the mediums and forms she uses in her work. Postmodernism is described as a rejection of ideas and concepts associated with modernism. Artistic techniques that are associated with postmodernist art in particular include: collage, appropriation, performance art, reinvention/recycling of past styles or work in a contemporary context, simplification, bricolage, and the mixing of high art and low art. Many of these themes can be seen in Gurney's work, as it is typically political in nature and does not follow a strict binary of thought.

One aspect of postmodernism that is directly related to Gurney's work is the presence of multiple elements. Collage art is considered the practice of assembling many individual elements (often consisting of different media) to create one new, complete image. Gurney's artistic style mimics collage due to the elemental aspects of her work. While she doesn't always overlap images, Gurney often mixes media and plays with the boundaries of artistic abstraction to create works that resemble collage. Gurney also often arranges her pieces side by side to assume one overall meaning – a technique that is reminiscent of collage art, though more contemporary in form.

Not only does Gurney interpret collage differently in her works, but her style (while consistent in nature) is fluent from one work to another. Gurney's work follows a surrealist style, and her overall aesthetic varies from piece to piece depending on her overall themes and intentions.

== Methodology ==
=== Actor-Network-Theory ===
The actor-network-theory (ANT) is a social methodology that suggests everything in the natural and social worlds exist in networks which are in a state of constant flux; furthermore, ANT proposes that nothing exists outside of these interconnected relationships. This theory aligns with Gurney's artistic tendency to connect with other artists by using their work in her own creations.

Gurney first learned about ANT in 2006, after conversing with Dave Kemp – a fellow student in the Master of Visual Studies program at University of Toronto. His explanation of this theory resonated with Gurney as a description of her artistic methodology despite her rejection of being placed into an artistic box.

Before learning about ANT formally, Gurney began her artistic career actively avoiding the development of a personal style which she considered a trap that hindered artistic development and growth; she did not want to be defined or confined by her artistic identity. Instead of focusing on differentiating herself from the artistic herd, she sought to connect with other artists and create links between herself, those around her, and history. She describes her early work as a ‘montage style’ in which she used works by other artists across a variety of media to create her own collage art. This method of art production demonstrates both the artistic and historical mapping/networking taking place in the majority of her work.

In an interview with Western University, Gurney summarized the important influence ANT continually has on her artistic practice, stating: “My research into Actor-Network-Theory gave me ways to think and talk about how different components from different times, people, and places could come together to create new meanings in a new context.”

== Major works and themes ==
The focus of Janice Gurney's work is most commonly concerned with location, connection, and continuity. She often incorporates or manipulates pre-existing images in her work, even at times using the work of other artists directly in her own artistic practice. By inserting and overlaying found images with her own creations, Gurney attempts to extend or alter the initial meanings of these works.

The medium of her art includes and is not limited to: paint, photography, video, photostatic enlargement, and the use of plexiglass.

In a 1987 summary of her own artistic process, Gurney claims, “I structure a completed work from a number of individual parts which are put together to form a matrix of identities, wherein I try to locate myself.”

Within Suzanne Giles’ book Janice Gurney, Sum Over Histories, Gurney is described as cynical, well thought out, and often reflects the public ideals of success, beauty, and imperfections. Overall, Gurney's portfolio is consistent in style and aesthetic; however, her work is drastically different from theme to theme.

=== Portrait of Me as My Grandmother's Faults (1982) ===
In Janice Gurney, Sum Over Histories, Suzanne Giles discusses the historical reflections of Gurney's Portrait of Me as My Grandmother's Faults (1982). According to Giles, Gurney both constructs and deconstructs meaning in the way she designs her initial subject only to paint over the figures in white.

=== The Surface of Behaviour (1988) ===
One work that reflects Gurney's style and recurring themes authentically is The Surface of Behavior (1988). In this piece Janice Gurney blends mediums and multiple works of art to create a collection of images representing one meaning. To create this work, she lays photographs, and paintings of multiple genres side by side. In Janice Gurney, Sum Over Histories, Suzanne Giles writes about Gurney's resistance to linear art by collaging multiple pieces, yet not necessarily blending them all together. The technique Giles describes can be seen within this specific work, as it consists of a collection of media.

=== Meaningful Work (1991) ===
Compared to The Surface of Behavior (1988), Meaningful Work (1991) demonstrates the versatility in Gurney's style, which she maintains from piece to piece by using Cibachromes, photostats, plexiglass, and duratrans from photographer Robert Flack. With its multitude of elements, this piece emulates a collage effect. While Gurney does not necessarily intend to create a collage of images by using a layering technique in this piece, the images side by side create the same sense of collaboration.

=== Dark (1999) ===
From September 16 to October 31, 1999, the McIntosh Gallery at the University of Western Ontario ran Janice Gurney's exhibition called Dark. The exhibition featured and compared Gurney's earlier work to her recent reinventions of these installations at the time. According to Arlene Kennedy, the artistic director at McIntosh Gallery during this show, the exhibition offered viewers the opportunity to explore the connection between “experimental information” and memory.

The exhibition displayed many ‘cancelled’ versions of Gurney's previous work. These ‘cancelled’ works are copies of her earlier pieces wherein some or all of the content has been blacked out; the result is at times a completely black canvas. These dark squares and indistinct forms are comparable to mirrors which reflect the gallery goers observing these pieces. Mark Cheetham describes Gurney's cancellations as “anything but erasures” which instead, serve as a reminder to the artist of her lifelong "passion for memory."

In reflecting on Gurney's previous work in relation to these cancelled versions, Barbara Fischer believes that this presentation challenges the viewer to remember what the works looked like before they were blacked out. She explains her viewing experience, stating:

“It's like being put into the dark, aggressively, and finding myself commanded to recite what it was that I saw on the page before the light was turned out. In the reflection that stares back at me darkly, I remember exponentially increasing details [of] ... the images that the black surfaces withhold, boldy. So, I guess, right in front of me, Janice has made history of her work.”

Therefore, the triumph of this installation, according to Fischer, is the evocation of Gurney's art in the mind of the viewer despite her work being simultaneously withheld from view.

In response to the exhibition, Sheila Ayearst explains that while Gurney's work often initially represents certain milestones of [a woman's] life, upon further consideration, Gurney's art invites the viewer to consider their relationship to not just what the art represents, but the art itself. In viewing Overexposed (1989) and Underexposed (1989) in particular, Ayearst found herself considering the physical space between her and the works. In her review, she even likens Gurney's work to paintings found in horror films: “[they] suddenly turn on me – they are aware of me, the viewer, and are returning the gaze in this space, now.”

The works included in this exhibition were as follows: Dark Room (1990), Cancelled (The Surface of Behaviour, 1988), Not (For the Audience, 1986), Underexposed (Name, 1989), Overexposed(Name, 1989), Swamped (1998), Dark (Dark Room, 1990), Un(Self-Consciousness, 1992), Non (1999).

=== Silent Reading (2007) ===
The work Silent Reading was part of Janice Gurney's graduating exhibition at the University of Toronto in 2007. This piece is a 160-minute video created by Gurney from 2006 to 2007, wherein she recorded seven writers silently reading in an empty room. The participants included: poets Ron Charach, Roo Borson and Kim Maltman, and novelists Andre Alexis, Catherine Bush, Guy Gavriel Kay and Cynthia Holz; each of the participants has a personal connection with Gurney and all are familiar with providing public readings. During every session, Gurney set up a camera and instructed the participant to sit in the chair provided, silently read a book of their choice for as long as they wanted, and leave the room once they were finished. In this exhibition, each recorded session was played in real-time to completion with its original audio as a part of a larger compilation. The segments were organized based on order of video length: beginning with Catherine Bush reading for 12:09 minutes and ending with Andre Alexis reading for 31:55 minutes. At the end of each video, the camera lingers on the empty chair left by each participant – an image that Gurney used on promotional materials for this exhibition. All readings remain uninterrupted, with the exception of Andre Alexis, whose video ends with the artist (Gurney) entering the room. Through taping the silent reading experiences of these seven individuals, Gurney explores the intersection of private and public realms, toying with social constraints of viewership, and questions methods of communication.

=== Thick Description (2007) ===
The work Thick Description is a complementary installation to Silent Reading. Set in Wynick/Tuck Gallery, Gurney records the gallery experience of six acquaintances: Mark Cheetham, Andre Alexis, David Galbraith, Lynne Wynick, Andy Patton and Robert Fones. Each participant is seated in front of the text-based painting Nice Day, Bad News, by Greg Curnoe. With the actual painting out of view, the camera keeps a tight frame on the viewers and their reactions. Through Gurney's recordings, the viewer is able to watch these individuals observe and voice their observations on the painting.

=== Credits (extended) (2012) ===
The exhibition Credits (extended) was shown from March 23 to June 2 at Museum London in 2012. The installation featured seven photographic panels created by Gurney that were hung underneath a selection of works belonging to the museum's permanent collection. The panels Gurney made include the names of individuals who are considered important to Gurney's professional career as an artist in Canada for more than thirty years. Gurney also included the works of artists from the Museum London collection including: Ron Benner, Greg Curnoe, Robert Fones, Jamelie Hassan, Patrick Mahon, David Merritt, and Arlene Stamp.

=== Translations & Alliances ===
Translations & Alliances in an ongoing project of Gurney's that works in relation to the English translations of The Meditations of Marcus Aurelius. From 2013 to 2016, Gurney created pieces based on the same meditation:

“My understanding of this meditation is fleeting. As a response to this sensation of instability, I dropped out the words of the meditation, leaving only red punctuation marks floating on a dark blue ground. The text becomes invisible—what remains is a structure provided by punctuation alone. These symbols of our breath reveal how the expression of our thoughts has changed over the centuries, and the shift in meaning that takes place in our bodies.”

The body of work currently includes 35 pieces. These works were installed at Birch Contemporary from November 27, 2014 to January 10, 2015. In addition to the works themselves, the installation included photographs of these paintings in various locations as well as photographs of the reflections that could be seen in the paintings. In displaying the works with these photographs, Gurney emphasizes connections between the paintings themselves and the things that interacted with these pieces.

== Collaborations ==
=== union language (1991) ===
This installation was held at Mercer Union, a non-profit art-space in Toronto, from September 5 to October 5, 1991. The exhibition featured the following artists in collaborative pairs: Janice Gurney with Kim Maltman, Richard Banks with Tom Dean, Therese Bolliger with Colette Whiten, Ian Carr-Harris with Patricia Homonylo, Robert Flack with Christian Morrison, and Oliver Girling with Roland Jean.

The works that were featured used a variety of media and covered a variety of content.

Janice Gurney and Kim Maltman created a piece titled: Harlow and the Technology of Love. This contribution includes documented photographs of behavioural experiments conducted by Harry and Margaret Harlow concerning mother and infant bonding in rhesus monkeys. These are juxtaposed with photos of Hollywood love icon Jean Harlow. In addition to photographs, this work includes a refrigerator cooling system, a shelf with various glues and adhesives, and a textual piece that is meant to be read like a poem, titled: The Affectional Systems.

According to the Mercer Union's summary of Gurney and Maltman's creation: “These groups of information interact to form a scathing commentary on the insidious ways that popular culture and science feed our negative stereotypes of women.”

=== Blind Stairs (2003-2004) ===
The work Blind Stairs is a collaborative exhibition created by Arlene Stamp, Mary Scott, and Janice Gurney shown from 2003 to 2004 in The Southern Alberta Art Gallery. This collaboration came together as all artists found they were at a similar place in their artistic journey, wherein they were revisiting and reinventing their previous works. Gurney's contribution to the exhibition included ‘cancelled’ versions of her older works.

Similar to Gurney, each artist is connected through their work towards appropriation and reinvention; likewise, they all share a fascination with connecting and analyzing the present through the work of the past, even from a personal lens.

This collective exhibition also connects the transgression of binaries each artist brings to their own work as a shared subversion – one that can be considered inherently feminist.

=== Conspiracies of Illusion: Projections of Space and Time (2012) ===
This exhibition, featuring work from Janice Gurney, Yam Lau, Nestor Kruger, David Reed, and the late Blinky Palermo, ran from August to November 2012 in the McMaster Museum of Art. The installation itself sought to explore how artists interact with space and time and alter their experiences within these dimensions. The works of these artists, including Gurney, challenge time and space as unproblematic and continuous.

== Major works and exhibitions ==
(2012) Credits (extended), Museum London

(2011) Outside Our Doors, Wynick/Tuck Gallery

(2010) Outside Our Doors, AGYU Gallery, York University.

(2008) Silent Reading & Thick Description, Wynick/Tuck Gallery

(2006) Punctuation in Translation, Wynick/Tuck Gallery

(2006) Meditation in Your Office, various offices at U. of Toronto

(2002) Portraits from Memory, Wynick/Tuck Gallery

(1999) Dark, McIntosh Gallery

(1998–1999) Not, A.L.L.M.

(1998) Cancelled, Wynick/Tuck Gallery

(1996) Not in Exhibition, Wynick/Tuck Gallery

(1995) States of Mind, Wynick/Tuck Gallery, Toronto, Ontario.

(1992–1994) Sum over Histories, Winnipeg Art Gallery, Power Plant, Mackenzie Art Gallery, London Regional Art and Historical Museums, Glenbow Museum.

(1992) Plots and Themes, Wynick/Tuck Gallery.

(1991) Plots and Themes, Laurentian Art Gallery.

(1990) The Last Tasmanians, Wynick/Tuck Gallery.

(1989) Name, 49th Parallel.

(1989) Interview, Embassy Cultural House.

(1988) The Surface of Behaviour, Gairloch Gallery.

(1988) Janice Gurney, Powerhouse Gallery.

(1988) Ashes and Diamonds, Wynick/Tuck Gallery.

(1986) For The Audience, Mount Saint Vincent Art Gallery.

The Damage is Done, Struts Gallery, Sackville, New Brunswick.

The Damage is Done, Wynick/Tuck Gallery, Toronto, Ontario.

(1984) Reparations, YYZ, Toronto, Ontario.

(1981) The Battle of the Somme, Anna Leonowens Gallery, Halifax. N.S. The Battle of the Somme, YYZ, Toronto, Ontario.

=== Group exhibitions ===
(2012) Conspiracies of Illusion: Projections of Time and Space, McMaster Museum of Art, Hamilton, Ontario.

The Embassy Cultural House, 1983 to 1990, Museum London, Ontario.

(2011) Where Will You Be In Eternity?, Thielsen Gallery, London, Ontario. 2010 Ampersand”, ArtLAB, UWO, London, Ontario.

(2009) The Artist and the Crowd in History, Museum London, Ontario.

Art:Wave: A Walk Through Sixties London, ArtLAB, UWO, Ontario.

“Production Still”, ArtLAB, UWO, London, Ontario.

(2008) Lynn Donoghue: Art and Artists, David Mirvish Books, Toronto, Ont. 2007

Silent Reading and Thick Description, 1 Spadina Ave., University of Toronto.

Titles, Balfour Books, Toronto, Ontario.

(2006) Janice Gurney/Dax Morrison, Forest City Gallery, London, Ont. 2003–04

Blind Stairs, MSV University Art Gallery, Halifax; Southern Alberta Art Gallery, Lethbridge; Nickle Art Museum, Calgary; Agnes Etherington Art Centre, Kingston. (catalogue)

(2003) Portrait of the Artist as..., Blackwood Gallery, U. of T., Mississauga, Ont. 2002

Collage, Wynick/Tuck Gallery, Toronto, Ontario.

Artists against the Occupation, Forest City Gallery, London, Ont.

My Rolodex, Blackwood Gallery, U. of T., Mississauga, Ont. 2001

The Way Up and the Way Down Are One and the Same, 5 Grafton Ave., Toronto, Ontario.

(2000) Time, Wynick/Tuck Gallery, Toronto, Ontario.

Odd Bodies, Nickle Arts Museum, Calgary, Alberta, and Oakville Galleries, Oakville, Ontario. Typecast, Wynick/Tuck Gallery, Toronto, Ontario.

(1999) Still Life, Harbourfront Centre, Toronto, Ontario

Reviews - Mass Media and Imagery, Art & Culture, Mercer Union, Tor.

Face, York Quay Gallery, Harbourfront Gallery, Toronto, Ontario; Atelier Circulaire, Montreal, Quebec; Whitby StationGallery, Whitby, Ontario

(1998) Texte/Counter-Text, Thielsen Gallery, London, Ontario.

The Word in Contemporary Canadian Art, Art Gallery of North York, Toronto.

(1997) The Exquisite Corpse in Lotusland, Presentation House Gallery, Van. Odd Bodies, National Gallery of Canada, Ottawa.

(1996) Limousine, Free Parking, Toronto, Ontario.

Bereft, Hallwalls, Buffalo, New York and Spaces, Cleveland, Ohio

(1995) Rates of Exchange: The Changing Value(s) of Art, Innis College, U. of T.

Milieu: of the Order of Presentation, S.L. Simpson Gallery, Toronto,

(1994) Rob-O-Rama: Radiating Circles of Everlasting Love Magic, YYZ, Toronto.

The Cabinet Project, The Power Plant, Toronto, Ontario.

(1993–94) Bookends and Odd Books, Walter Phillips Gallery, Banff, Alberta

(1993) Visual Evidence, Dunlop Art Gallery, Regina, Sask.

(1992) Unlocked Grids, Winnipeg Art Gallery, Winnipeg, Man.

CIAE International Art Exposition, Chicago, Illinois.

Brief Window, Glendon Gallery, Toronto, Ontario

Travelling Theory, Jordan National Art Gallery, Amman, Jordan; McIntosh Gallery, London, Ontario.

(1991) Union Language, Mercer Union, Toronto, Ontario.

(1990–91) MemoryWorks: Postmodern Impulses in Canadian Art, London Regional Art and Historical Museums, London, Ont., Mississauga Civic Centre & Glenbow Museum, Calgary, Alberta.

(1990) Trans-positions, Transit System, Vancouver, B.C. Telling Things, Art Metropole, Toronto, Ontario.

Connected Voices, Art Gallery of Peterborough, Peterborough, Ont.

Re-enactment: Between Self and Other, The Power Plant Gallery, Toronto.

Fault Line, Art Gallery of Northumberland, Cobourg, Ont.

(1988) Identity/Identities, Winnipeg Art Gallery, Winnipeg, Manitoba.

Art, Sight and Language: a Reading/Writing of Some Contemporary Canadian Art, Art Gallery of Algoma, Sault Ste. Marie, Ontario.

(1987) Toronto Exchange Show, Hallwalls, Buffalo, New York. Cut, Wynick/Tuck Gallery, Toronto, Ont.

An Active Process: Artists' Books Photographic and Contemporary, Presentation House, North Vancouver, B.C.

At the Threshold, S.L. Simpson Gallery, Toronto, Ontario. Acknowledgements, Mercer Union, Toronto, Ontario.

Two Person Show, Coburg Gallery, Vancouver, B.C.

(1986) Art Cologne `86: 20th Annual International Art Fair, Cologne, Germany.

Je, Tu, Elle, Powerhouse Gallery, Montreal, Quebec

YYZ World Tour 86, Embassy Cultural House, London, Ont.

In a Different Voice, YYZ and The Funnel, Toronto, Ontario.

(1985) Photographic Memory, Coburg Gallery, Vancouver, B.C.

Urban Circuit, (N)On-Commercial Gallery, Vancouver, B.C.

Production/Reproduction, Norman MacKenzie Art Gallery, Regina.

She writes in white ink, Walter Phillips Gallery, Banff, Alta.

(1984) Sensations of Reading, London Regional Art Gallery, London, Ont. Subjects in Pictures, 49th Parallel, New York, NY; YYZ, Toronto, Ont.

(1983) International Women's Coalition, Embassy Cultural House, London. Photographic Sources, S.L. Simpson Gallery, Toronto, Ont.

Grain, A.K.A., Saskatoon, Saskatchewan. Production/Reproduction, A Space, Toronto, Ontario. Parisian Laundry, Women in Focus, Vancouver, B.C. Department for the West, Eye Level Gallery, Halifax, N.S.

(1982) Representation as a Kind of Absence, Open Space, Victoria, B.C.

YYZ Monumenta, YYZ, Toronto, Ontario.

== Published work ==
Website: janicegurney.ca

(2008) “Evidence of Activism in the Greg Curnoe Archives”, Topia: Canadian Journal of Cultural Studies, 20, York University, Toronto, 2008.

(2002) “ I Am Not You”, from “We are not Greg Curnoe”, Open Letter, 11th series, #5, 2002.

(2002) “Leaves”, artist's postcard, Blackwood Gallery, U. of Toronto, Mississauga, Ont., 2002.

(2002) “Panya Clark Espinal and Lawrence Paul Yuxweluptun”, Lola 12, Summer, Tor., 2002.

(2000) “Speculation (Blue Chip, Red Dot)”, Capital Culture, ed. by Berland, J. & Hornstein, S., McGill-Queen's University Press, Mtl. & Kingston, 2000.

(1997) “Hopeless Misrepresentation: An Interview with FASTWURMS”, Lola 1, Toronto, Dec 1997.

(1994) “The Tremor of Forgery”, The Windsor Review, Vol. 27, No. 1, Spring, 1994 University of Windsor, Ontario.

(1992) “A Flow of Information”, Harbour, Vol.2, No.1, Fall, 1992, Montreal, Quebec.

(1992) “The Salvage Paradigm”, pamphlet, YYZ & Wynick/Tuck Gallery, Toronto, 1992.

(1989) “Morality, the Body, and Death”, Artviews, Visual Arts Ontario, Toronto, March/April/May 1989.

(1988) “The Taking of Photographs is Strictly Prohibited”, Parachute #50, Mtl., 1988. “The Surface of Behaviour”, Photo Communique, Spring, Toronto, 1988.

(1987) Cover, Artviews, Visual Arts Ontario, Toronto, Fall Issue, 1987.

(1986) “Foreword”, The Interpretation of Architecture, (catalogue) YYZ, Tor., 1986.

(1985) “Emphasis Mine”, C Magazine, No.5, 1985, Toronto.

(1984) “Jamelie Hassan: London Regional Art Gallery”, Parachute, Fall, Mtl., 1984.

(1983) “Fig.1”, Grain, Saskatoon, Saskatchewan, November 1983.

=== Books ===
(2006) One Meditation, Book 9, #15, self-published, Toronto, Ontario

(1984) Moveable Wounds (An Essay in Composition), Art Metropole, Toronto.
