= Westsyde =

Residential neighborhood in Canada

Coordinates: 50°46′00″N 120°21′00″W

Westsyde is a residential neighbourhood in the city of Kamloops, British Columbia, Canada. It is located along the west bank of the North Thompson River. The 2001 Canadian Census put the population of Westsyde at 7797.

The name was first used in 1920 to name a new school in the area then known as Fruitlands where a Fruitlands school already existed and the name was first used for the community itself in the 1950s.
