= Aberdeen, Kamloops =

Coordinates: 50°39′00″N 120°22′00″W

Aberdeen is a neighbourhood in the southern area of Kamloops, British Columbia. It is bordered by Highway 5A (known as the Old Merritt highway) to the east and the Trans Canada Highway to the north. Located on the slope of the southern hills overlooking Kamloops, Aberdeen overlooks the city and surrounding Thompson River valley from the south. The neighbourhood gets its name John Hamilton-Gordon, seventh Earl of Aberdeen, Governor General of Canada from 1893 to 1898. He visited Kamloops in November 1894.

== Housing ==
As one of the fastest-growing neighbourhoods in Kamloops, Aberdeen has become a popular location to live for both new and current residents, with a mix of multi-unit condominiums ranging from 3-floor to larger single-family dwellings. It is one of the most transit-accessible neighbourhoods of Kamloops, serviced by both the Aberdeen #7 and Pacific Way #4 bus routes. It is within walking distance of industrial Southgate as well as both Lower and Upper Sahali.

== Business ==
While Aberdeen is primarily residential, there are some major retailers, including Costco. Aberdeen is also home to many of the city's hotels, mainly situated on the Rogers Way corridor between Hugh Allan Drive, one of the neighbourhood's main thoroughfares, and Highway 5A.Aberdeen is also home to Cascades Casino.

== Education ==
There are two elementary schools in the area, Aberdeen Elementary, and Pacific Way Elementary. Both service grades K-7. There currently is no high school serving the Aberdeen area, however, building one is top priority for the local School District 73 Kamloops/Thompson School Board. There is an Aberdeen Community Association.

== See also ==
- Aberdeen
