= Riverside Park (Kamloops) =

Public park in British Columbia, Canada

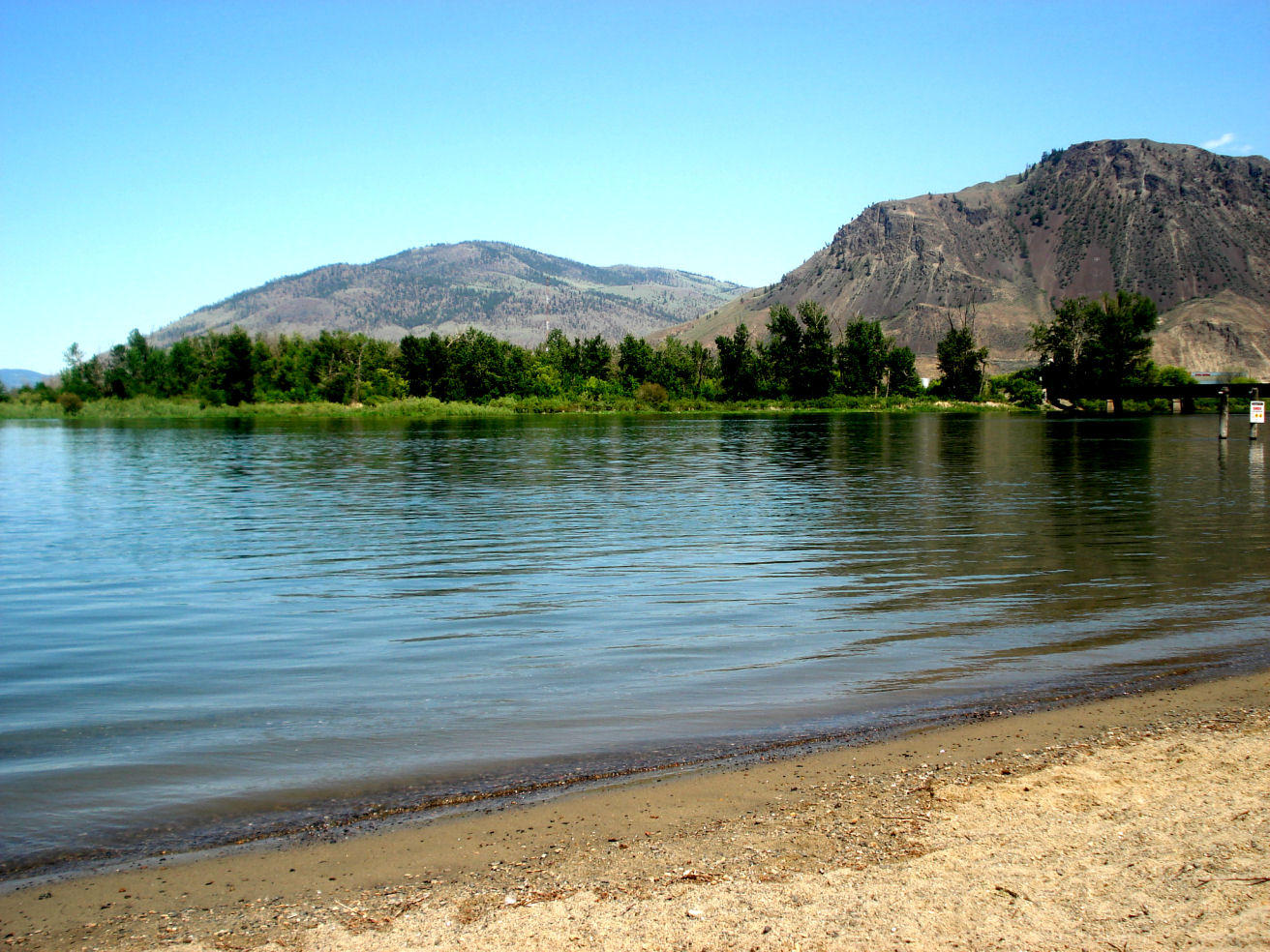
- View of Mount Paul from Riverside Park.
- Interactive map of Riverside Park
- Location: Kamloops, British Columbia, Canada
- Coordinates: 50.678°N 120.339°W
- Status: Open all year
- Website: Riverside Park

Riverside Park is a park in Kamloops, British Columbia, Canada, at the confluence of the North and South Thompson Rivers, which join to become the Thompson River.

== Landscape and features ==
The park extends longitudinally along the riverfront, with Lorne Street forming its southern boundary. The terrain consists primarily of gently sloping green spaces interspersed with mature trees and landscaped areas.

The park's layout includes extensive pathway systems that wind throughout the grounds, connecting various facilities and providing access to different areas of the park. Part of the Rivers Trail, a network of 40km of trails connecting Kamloops’ downtown and North Shore along the North and South Thompson Rivers, runs along the waterfront in the park. The western portion of the park features more densely wooded areas, while the central and eastern sections contain the majority of recreational facilities and open spaces, including the Sandman Centre.

The park's facilities include an accessible water park, a playground, the Rotary Bandshell, and the Heritage House. Various gardens are integrated into the landscape, including the Uji Friendship Garden, a community garden, and a rose garden.

== History ==
In 1885, the site that would eventually become the park was used as a campsite by Chinese Canadians from Savona's Ferry working on the Canadian Pacific Railway. When members of the On-to-Ottawa Trek stopped in Kamloops on their way from Vancouver to Ottawa, Ontario, in 1935, Mayor W.J. Moffat offered the men an empty hospital to sleep in, but the men declined, many choosing rather to sleep in Riverside Park where they had only one blanket to share between three or four men. In 2011, a parking garage was proposed to be built in the park, but a group called the Friends of Riverside Park gathered signatures from more than 10% of the Kamloops electorate opposing the proposal, thereby forcing a referendum on the subject. Before the referendum could take place, however, the city council unanimously voted to put an end to the plans to build the parking garage.

== Gallery ==
Features of Riverside Park

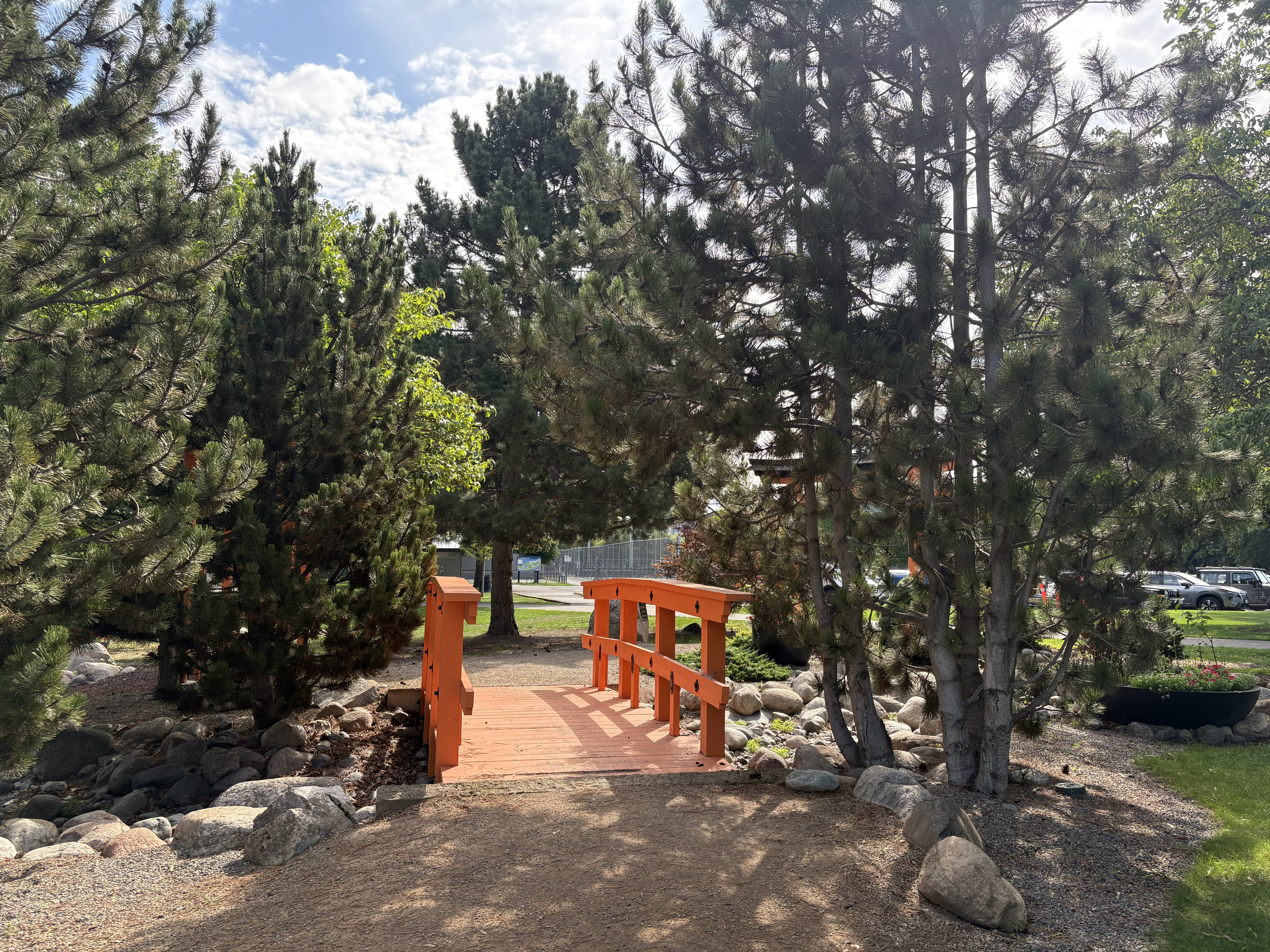

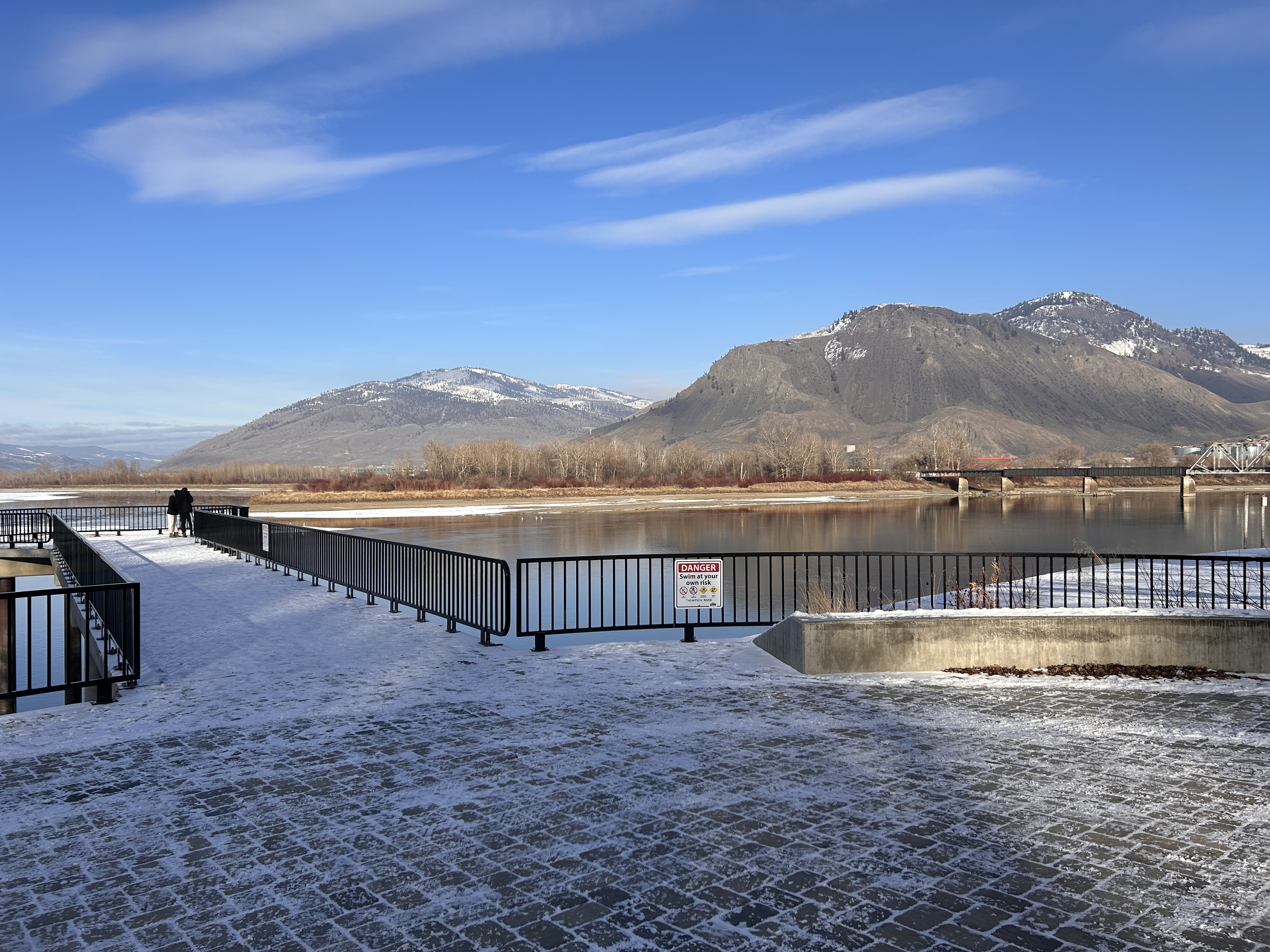

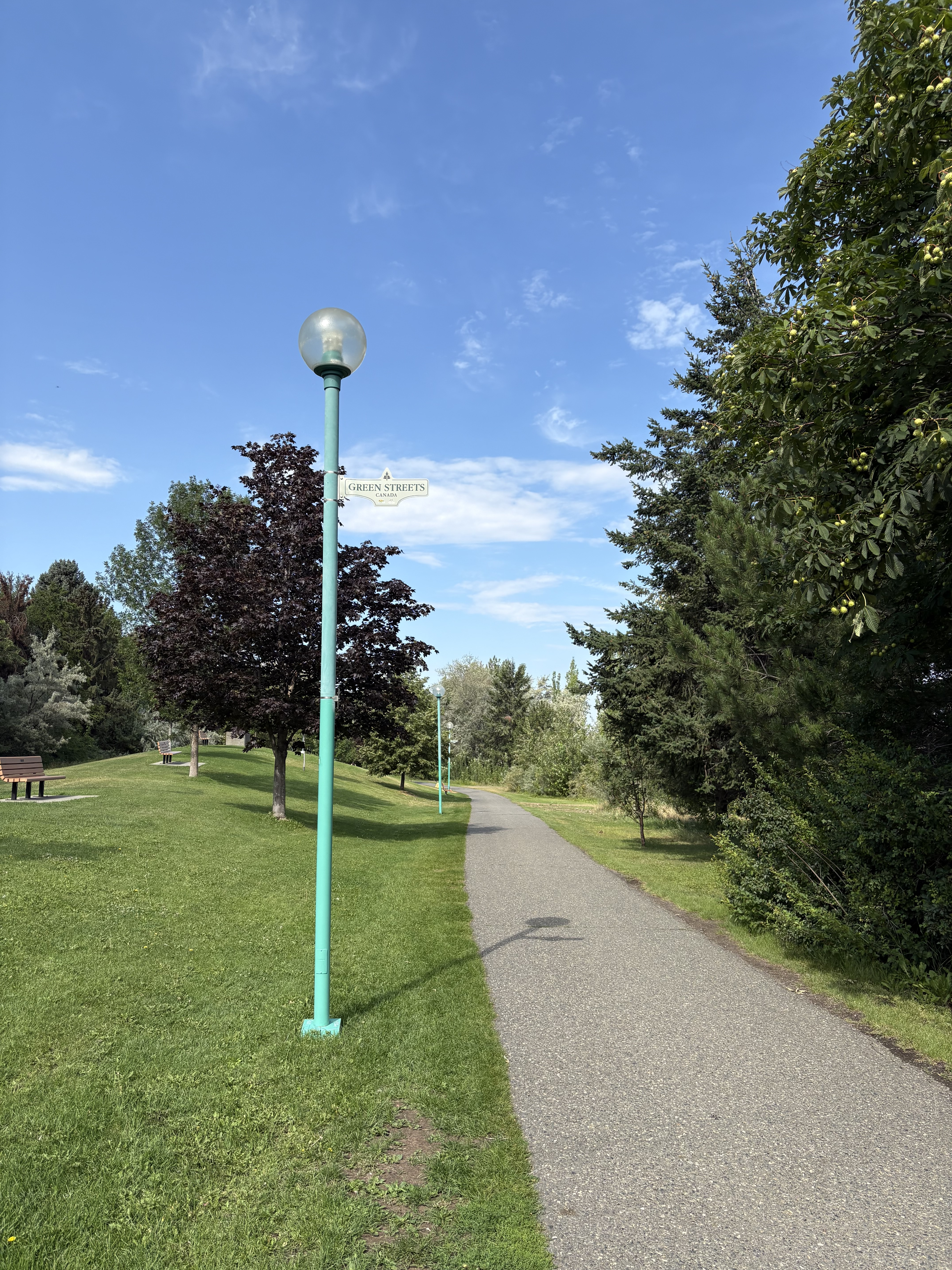
