= Rayleigh, Kamloops =

Coordinates: 50°49′00″N 120°18′00″W

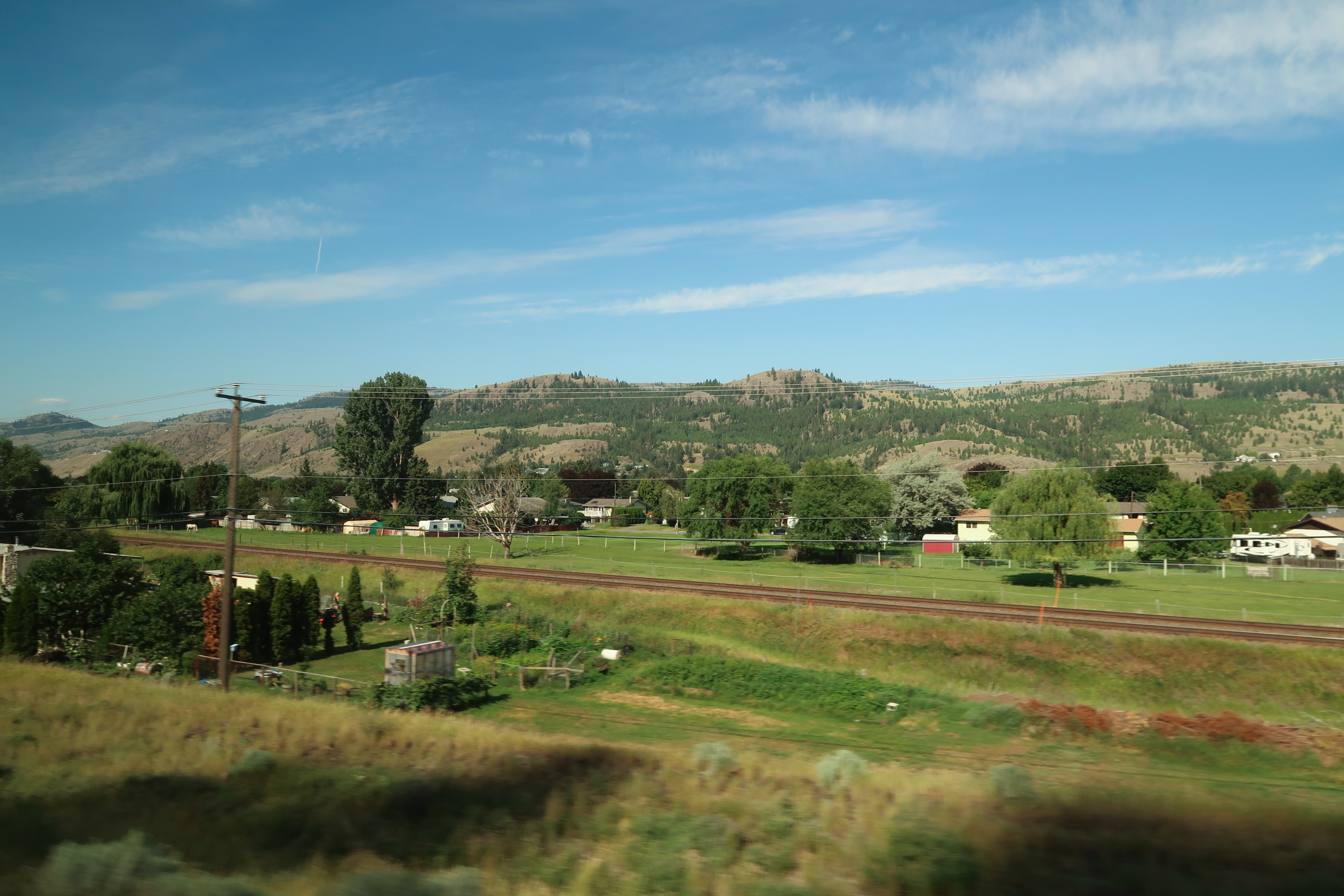
Rayleigh (2018)

Rayleigh is a neighbourhood of Kamloops, British Columbia, Canada along Highway 5 (the Yellowhead Highway). It is located on the east side of the North Thompson River and south of the community of Heffley Creek.

== History ==
In May 1973, the municipality of Rayleigh was added to the city of Kamloops. A former post office here was named Rayleigh Mount. This post office was named by the first postmaster W A Belcham after his home town in England. He, his wife Elizabeth, and son W A K Belcham operated the post office until the 1940s when they moved to Little Fort. Native reserve lands and the Thompson River separate Rayleigh and Heffley Creek from the rest of Kamloops.

In the past years the City of Kamloops finished building a new recreational facility called 'Tournament Capital Ranch', just north of Rayleigh consisting of "Softball City". The park is open seven days a week between 5am and 11pm and offers miles of river views, walking and tournament opportunities. It is one of Western Canada's largest stand alone slo-pitch facilities and also has 2 full-size rugby fields, parking for up to 350 vehicles, washroom/plaza building, public washrooms, areas for concession and event rooms.

The 1996 census placed Rayleigh's population at 2,222 people.
