= Todd Esselmont =

Canadian ice hockey player

- Born: November 5, 1971 (age 53); Kamloops, British Columbia, Canada
- Position: Centre
- Played for: Tacoma Sabercats; Bakersfield Condors
- Playing career: 1988–2002

Todd Esselmont (born November 5, 1971) is a Canadian professional hockey player, who played both ice and roller hockey professionally. His position is a centre.

== Career ==
Esselmont's junior hockey career started in the 1988–1989 season, toiling back and forth between the Kamloops Blazers of the Western Hockey League and the Penticton Knights of the British Columbia Junior Hockey League. In his stint with Penticton that year, he recorded 14 goals, 18 assists, 32 points, and 44 PIM's in 44 games. He played two more seasons with Kamloops before playing with the Swift Current Broncos for one season and the Tri-City Americans for two more seasons. His junior career ended in the BCJHL, playing for the Bellingham Ice Hawks.

In 1993 and 1994 respectively, he played in Roller Hockey International for the Vancouver Voodoo. His 1993 season finished successfully, as he ranked five in RHI's scoring title.

For the 1997–1998 season, he played in Germany with Limburg EG of Oberliga. He then played in the West Coast Hockey League with the Bakersfield Condors. Prior to playing for Bakersfield, he appeared in a few exhibition games with the now-defunct Tacoma Sabercats.
