= Kenna Cartwright Park =

Park in Kamloops, Canada

- Interactive map of Kenna Cartwright Park
- Type: Urban park
- Location: Kamloops, British Columbia, Canada
- Coordinates: 50.67°N 120.4°W
- Area: 1,976 Acres
- Created: 1996
- Operator: City of Kamloops Parks
- Status: Open all year

Kenna Cartwright Park is a municipal park located in Kamloops, British Columbia. The park was created to preserve one of Kamloops' natural landscapes and views. It is named after the former mayor, Kenna Cartwright. It features over 40 kilometres (25 mi) of hiking trails through grasslands, hills, valleys, and Ponderosa Pine and Douglas Fir forests.

It is the largest municipal park in British Columbia. The mountain area on which the park is located was previously known as Mount Dufferin.
