= North Kamloops =

Coordinates: 50°42′00″N 120°22′00″W

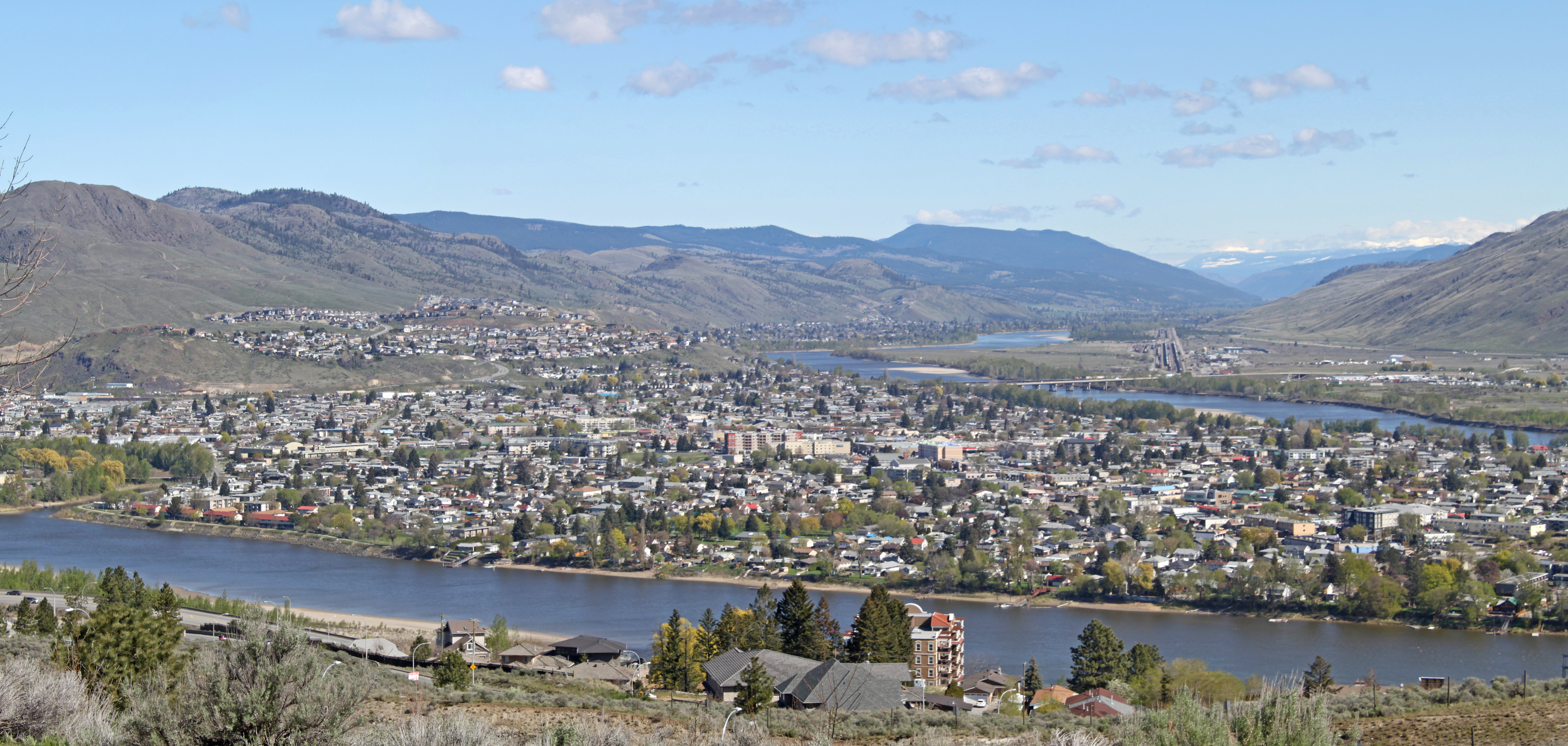
View of North Kamloops looking north from Thompson Rivers University

North Kamloops is a neighbourhood and former town located in the City of Kamloops, British Columbia, Canada. It is located immediately to the northwest of Downtown Kamloops across the confluence of the North and South Thompson Rivers. In 2016, North Kamloops had a population of 10,995, or 12.2% of Kamloops' total population of 90,280, and had the highest population density of any neighbourhood in the city at 2,750 people per km^{2}. North Kamloops is one of four neighbourhoods the City of Kamloops considers part of its Core, the others being Downtown, Sagebrush, and the West End - all on the south shore of the city.

== History ==
North Kamloops was formerly occupied by the Hudson’s Bay Company, when it moved its fort the west side of the North Thompson River in 1842. Canadian Real Properties was formed in 1903 and incorporated in 1907 as B.C. Fruitlands, a large agricultural tract, and soon a small village formed in the southeast corner. In 1912, the Canadian Northern Railway arrived and passed through North Kamloops; however the Canadian Pacific Railway and previously arrived in 1883 and passed south of the river through Kamloops. North Kamloops incorporated into a village in 1946 and into a town in 1961. Discussions about amalgamtation with the City of Kamloops began in 1964 and were accomplished in 1967.
