= Sahali, Kamloops =

Sahali
- Neighbourhood of Kamloops
- Interactive map of Sahali
- Location of Sahali within Kamloops
- Coordinates: 50°39′00″N 120°20′00″W
- Country: Canada
- Province: British Columbia
- Region: British Columbia Interior
- Regional District: Thompson-Nicola
- City: Kamloops
- Elevation: 500–700 m (1,600–2,300 ft)

Population (2021)
  - Total: 12,807
- Time zone: UTC−8 (PST)
  - Summer (DST): UTC−7 (PDT)

Sahali (or Sa-hali) is a neighbourhood in South Kamloops, British Columbia, Canada, bordered by the Aberdeen and Downtown districts. It is home to most of Kamloops' major grocery and big box stores. It is also site of one of British Columbia's newest universities: Thompson Rivers University. The neighbourhood is the largest in Kamloops and consists of an Upper and Lower Sahali, with an estimated total population of about 12,000 in 2003.

== Etymology ==
The neighbourhood's name derives from the word sahali, a local version of the Chinook Jargon word usually seen as saghalie in published lexicons of the Jargon. Its basic meaning is 'up' or 'above' but in this context meaning 'high ground'.

== Geography ==
Sahali is situated on high ground overlooking the valley of the Thompson River. Featuring unique and expansive natural landscapes, Sa-Hali is a sub-rural area.

== Demography ==
Population history
Year	Pop.	±%
1986	8,180	—
1991	9,414	+15.1%
1996	11,472	+21.9%
2001	11,762	+2.5%
2006	11,894	+1.1%
2011	11,989	+0.8%
2016	12,151	+1.4%
2021	12,807	+5.4%
Source: Statistics Canada

Panethnic groups in Sahali (1991−2021)
Panethnic group	2021 census		2016 census		2011 census		2006 census		2001 census		1996 census		1991 census	
Panethnic group	Pop.	%	Pop.	%	Pop.	%	Pop.	%	Pop.	%	Pop.	%	Pop.	%
European (Note: Statistic includes all persons that did not make up part of a visible minority or an indigenous identity.)	9,405	74.55%	9,125	76.17%	9,975	84.39%	10,305	86.96%	10,380	88.19%	10,185	90.49%	8,215	89.05%
Indigenous	1,085	8.6%	1,110	9.27%	560	4.74%	695	5.86%	535	4.55%	325	2.89%	520	5.64%
South Asian	870	6.9%	545	4.55%	355	3%	130	1.1%	135	1.15%	185	1.64%	70	0.76%
East Asian (Note: Statistic includes total responses of "Chinese", "Korean", and "Japanese" under visible minority section on census.)	440	3.49%	675	5.63%	580	4.91%	505	4.26%	555	4.72%	370	3.29%	225	2.44%
African	295	2.34%	140	1.17%	35	0.3%	30	0.25%	45	0.38%	45	0.4%	25	0.27%
Southeast Asian (Note: Statistic includes total responses of "Filipino" and "Southeast Asian" under visible minority section on census.)	265	2.1%	175	1.46%	100	0.85%	55	0.46%	60	0.51%	55	0.49%	70	0.76%
Latin American	150	1.19%	105	0.88%	15	0.13%	20	0.17%	30	0.25%	50	0.44%	50	0.54%
Middle Eastern (Note: Statistic includes total responses of "West Asian" and "Arab" under visible minority section on census.)	85	0.67%	70	0.58%	200	1.69%	55	0.46%	30	0.25%	30	0.27%	10	0.11%
Other/multiracial (Note: Statistic includes total responses of "Visible minority, n.i.e." and "Multiple visible minorities" under visible minority section on census.)	20	0.16%	35	0.29%	0	0%	55	0.46%	0	0%	10	0.09%	40	0.43%
Total responses	12,615	98.5%	11,980	98.59%	11,820	98.59%	11,850	99.63%	11,770	100.07%	11,255	98.11%	9,225	97.99%
Total population	12,807	100%	12,151	100%	11,989	100%	11,894	100%	11,762	100%	11,472	100%	9,414	100%
Note: Totals greater than 100% due to multiple origin responses

== Education ==
Several schools are located in Sahali, including Sa-Hali Secondary School, the neighbourhood's only high school. The elementary schools in Sahali are:

- Summit Elementary School
- South Sa-Hali Elementary School (A French immersion school)
- McGowan Park Elementary School
- Kamloops Open Online Learning Education Center (An online school)
- Sahali Secondary School
