= Knutsford, Kamloops =

Coordinates: 50°37′00″N 120°20′00″W

Knutsford is a neighbourhood of the City of Kamloops, British Columbia, Canada, located on the south side of that city just west of Peterson Creek. It is named for Knutsford, Cheshire, by Robert Longridge, who took up ranching in the area in 1912.

== See also ==
Knutsford, British Columbia (unincorporated)
