= Kranked =

Series of freeride mountain-biking films

Kranked is a series of extreme freeride mountain-biking films.

Since 1997, Bjørn Enga, producer/director for Radical Films has specialized in extreme mountain bike cinematography. His work has won the People's Choice Award at the Banff Mountain Film Festival in 2010 and 2015 and he was voted the #1 Adrenaline Filmmaker by Outside Magazine's Top Ten TV show.

Stu Mackay-Smith has created the Kranked artwork and animation since 1997 with music contributions from Brian Carson and some of the voice overs performed by Vancouver hip-hop artist Kia Kadiri.

== Series ==
- Kranked - Live to Ride, (1998)
- Kranked 2 - Trails from the Crypt, (1999)
- Kranked 3 - Ride Against the Machine, (2000)
- Kranked 4 - Search for the Holey Trail, (2001)
- Kranked 5 - In Concert, (2003)
- Kranked 6 - Progression, (2006)
- Kranked 7 - The Cackle Factor, (2008)
- Kranked 8 - Revolve, (2009)

== Awards ==
- Trial & Error: People´s Choice Award
- Kranked 8 - Revolve : People´s Choice Award

== Trivia ==
The video trailer of Kranked 6 was bundled with Microsoft's Zune.

== See also ==
- Freeride
- Freeride mountain-biking movies
