= Vivian Dowding =

Canadian activist

Vivian Dowding (1892–1987) was a Canadian activist based in British Columbia who worked to increase access to birth control for working-class women. Affiliated with the Parents' Information Bureau and resident in Kamloops, she travelled through the Southern Interior of British Columbia from 1937, promoting contraception, educating medical practitioners about family planning and assisting low-income women to avoid unplanned pregnancies while operating in defiance of laws then criminalizing many forms of birth-control provision in Canada.

== Activism ==
Dowding represented the Parents' Information Bureau in British Columbia. Beginning in 1937 she travelled extensively through the Southern Interior, including visits to small towns and rural communities, where she distributed contraceptive information and materials and sought to persuade physicians to provide family-planning services. She placed these activities in a wider political and social framework, influenced by international birth-control advocates such as Margaret Sanger and by movements for women’s economic autonomy; Dowding described birth-control access as a means to reduce poverty among low-income women.

Dowding often acted in contravention of legal restrictions on contraception provision and distribution that were enforced in Canada until legislative reform in the late 1960s; the explicit Criminal Code provisions that had limited distribution were removed in reforms culminating in 1969. Her work met resistance from some local medical practitioners and community officials; contemporary accounts record incidents such as being turned away from medical offices and occasional interference with contraceptive supplies sent by post.

== Political involvement ==
Dowding was active in the Co-operative Commonwealth Federation (CCF) and later in the New Democratic Party (NDP), participating in party activities and aligning her birth-control advocacy with broader goals of social reform.

== Legacy ==
Histories of women’s health in British Columbia identify Dowding among the early and persistent activists who laid groundwork for broader public acceptance of family planning services in the province. Her activities have been cited in provincial histories and archival interviews that document both her methods and the social context of contraception before regulatory change.
