= Arlene Stamp =

Canadian artist (born 1938)

- Born: 1938; London, Ontario
- Known for: conceptual artist

Arlene Stamp RCA (born 1938) is a Canadian conceptual artist and educator who lives and works in Calgary, Alberta.

== Career ==
Born in London, Ontario, Stamp initially studied mathematics, graduating in 1960 from the University of Western Ontario. This background influenced her study of art, first at the Alberta College of Art and Design (1974–1976) and then at the University of Calgary (1979–1980). She is noted for her "mathematical-abstract paintings" and works based on "complex mathematical formulas and recursive pattern theories". She has completed an artistic series on the work of Gladys Johnston, the colour red, and the grid patterns of floor tiles, among other concepts. Her work has been exhibited across Canada and she has worked collaboratively with other artists on installations and site-specific pieces. In 2013, Nickle Galleries in Calgary held a retrospective of Stamp's 30-year practice with an exhibition of paintings, drawings and installations.

A teacher at art schools across the country, Stamp has also held studio residencies at the Emma Lake Artists' Workshops (1977) and the Banff Centre for continuing education (1979). She was inducted into the Royal Canadian Academy of Arts in 2007.
