= Mildred Gottfriedson =

Mildred Gottfriedson (1918–1989) was a Secwepemc educator and activist who was a leading member of the Kamloops Indian Band. She was the first First Nations individual to be inducted into the Order of Canada in 1977. She was also a founding member and former president of the B.C. Native Women's Society. Throughout her life, Gottfriedson acted as an advocate for the Shuswap Nation, working to revive and promote the arts of her community. She raised 13 children, fostering over 20 others and was awarded Mother of the Year at both the Provincial (1963) and Federal (1964) level.
