= Kamloops Airport =

Airport near Kamloops, British Columbia, Canada

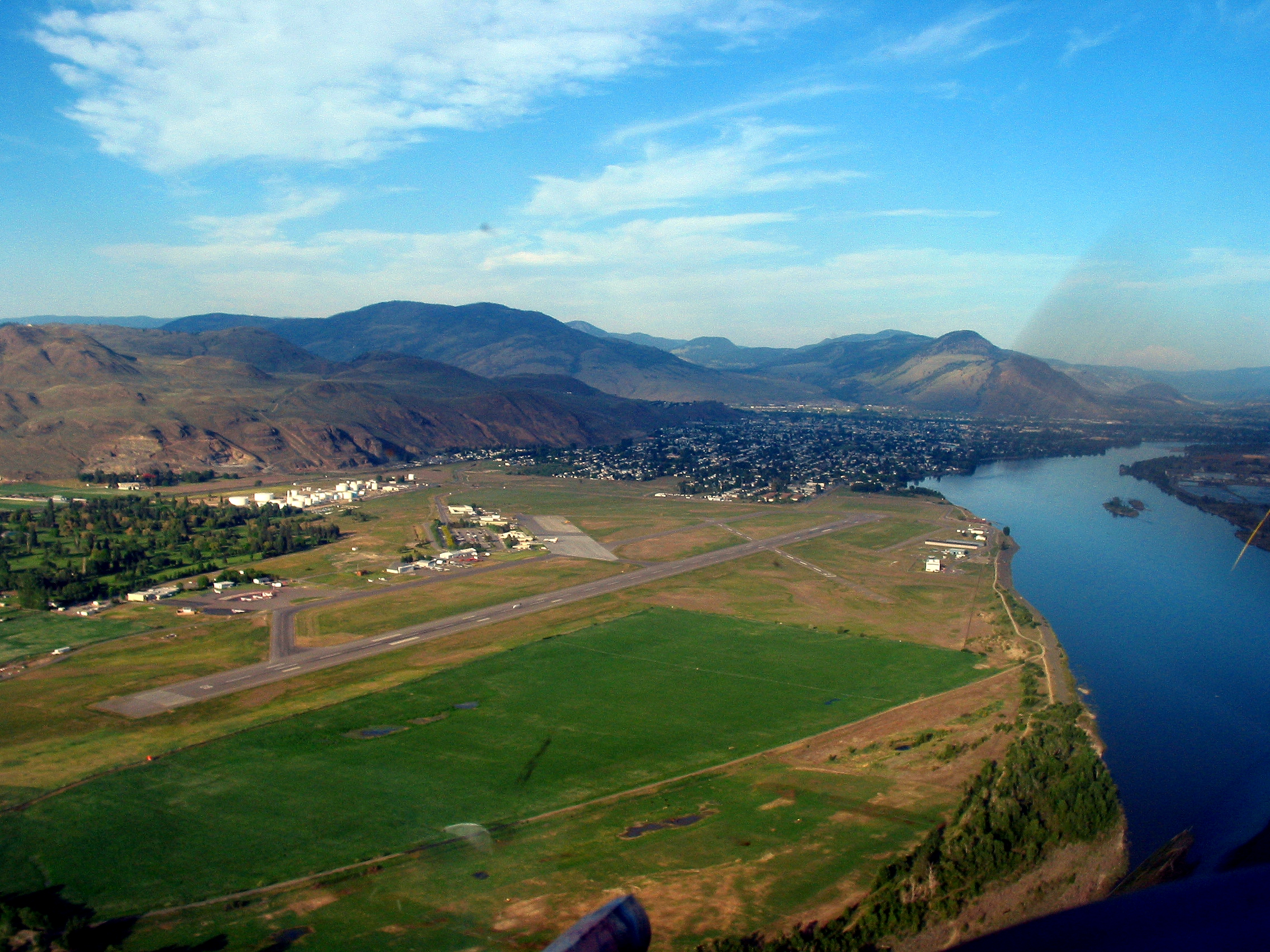
- Main terminal building
- IATA: YKA; ICAO: CYKA; WMO: 71887

Summary
- Airport type: Public
- Owner: Kamloops Airport Authority Society
- Operator: Kamloops Airport Limited
- Location: Kamloops, British Columbia, Canada
- Opened: August 5, 1939
- Time zone: MST (UTC−07:00)
- Elevation AMSL: 1,133 ft (345 m)
- Coordinates: 50°42′09″N 120°26′55″W
- Website: kamloopsairport.com

Map
- Location of the airport in British Columbia, Canada

Runways
Direction	Length		Surface
Direction	ft	m	Surface
05/23	1,875	572	Asphalt
09/27	8,000	2,438	Asphalt

Statistics (2010–12)
- Aircraft movements (2010): 36,094
- Passengers (2023): 361,586
- Source: Canada Flight Supplement; CYKA NOTAM file Environment Canada; Movements from Statistics Canada; Passengers from The Daily News

Kamloops Airport (IATA: YKA, ICAO: CYKA), also known as Fulton Field or John "Moose" Fulton Airfield, is a regional airport located 5 nautical miles (9 km; 6 mi) west northwest of Kamloops, British Columbia, a city in the Thompson region of Canada. It is owned by the Kamloops Airport Authority Society, while operated by Kamloops Airport Limited, serving the North Okanagan, Nicola and Shuswap areas. Initial examination for the airport's construction began in June 1931, when the city leased 46 acres (19 ha) from fruit-growing company BC Fruitlands.

Along with an air show presentation, the airport publicly opened on August 5, 1939. It has 2,780 by 49 ft (847 by 15 m) and 8,000 by 148 ft (2,438 by 45 m) runways aligned 05/23 and 09/27, and served approximately 263,290 passengers in 2011. The airfield maintains a restaurant, The Bread Garden, as well as a medical facility, accommodation areas and administrative buildings; food and snacks are also offered. Its terminal, runway and navigation aids were expanded and upgraded by 2009. It has seen one accident throughout its history.

The airport has daily scheduled flights to four destinations in Canada operated by Air Canada Express, Pacific Coastal Airlines and WestJet. The terminal handled 312,895 passengers in 2014, an increase of 7.2% over the 290,394 passengers in 2013.

== History ==
Initial examination for constructing an airport in Kamloops began in June 1931, when the city leased 46 acres (19 ha) from fruit-growing company BC Fruitlands. The airport's development started in 1936 and the gravel runway was completed in 1938. That same year, Kamloops acquired another 30 acres (12 ha), as well as land for airport use. The Department of Transport, now known as Transport Canada, granted money for airport development in 1939, with the airfield's runway finishing in that year. On April 13, 1939, an Aeronca aircraft made the first official landing on the runway. The airport was publicly opened on August 5, 1939, along with an air show presented at the structure itself with over 30 aircraft. Later that month, it was classified as a port of entry by the Canadian government. During World War II, additional activity occurred at the airport. In April 1942, Vancouver-based Gilbert Flight School transferred its service to Kamloops, as civil flights provided in British Columbia's Lower Mainland were canceled.

In addition, the airport was used by the Royal Canadian Air Force (RCAF) as an alternate route for the no longer existent Air Transport Command (ATC) for flights to the Soviet Union. During the war Kamloops gained access to 861 acres (348 ha) for further airport expansion, as well as the addition of taxi and apron services. However, after World War II, part of the airport's land were sold to Canada's Department of Agriculture, with the size reducing to 570 acres (230 ha). In May 1944, the Governor General of Canada at that time, Earl of Athlone, entitled the structure Fulton Field, in honor of John Fulton, a Wing Commander server born in Kamloops. This was confirmed by George H. Greer, the secretary of the Kamloops Board of Trade at the time. Throughout its history, a number of airlines have served it. Canadian Pacific Air Lines provided daily flights in 1950 connecting to the communities of Quesnel, Prince George, Williams Lake and Vancouver.

By 1951, the airport founded and became headquarters of Central British Columbia Airways, which was later known as Pacific Western Airlines, but is no longer existent. However, the following year, its headquarters was transferred to Richmond's Vancouver International Airport. The federal Department of Transport regained rights to the airport in 1961, beginning an expansion program. The airfield saw its runways expand in 1963 and 1964.

In 1966, Canadian Pacific Air Lines was serving the airport with a Vancouver – Kamloops – Prince George – Fort. St. John – Grande Prairie – Edmonton round trip flight operated with a Douglas DC-6B propliner six days a week and also a Kamloops – Williams Lake – Quesnel – Prince George round trip flown with a Douglas DC-3 six days a week as well with both of these services not operating on Sundays. The first air traffic controllers started working at Kamloops Airport in 1967. That year the airport served approximately 29,200 passengers.

There had previously been proposals for relocating the airport due to low public visibility during the fall and winter seasons of a specific year. The move was never carried out because another location could not be found. Instead the airport was expanded by 1969. This saw its administrative buildings, offices, baggage area and coffee shop being improved, costing $85,000.

Also by 1969, jet service had arrived at Kamloops as Pacific Western Airlines had begun nonstop Boeing 737-200 jetliner flights to Vancouver and Calgary with additional nonstop service to Vancouver being operated by the air carrier with Convair 640 turboprop aircraft which the airline called the "Javelin Jet-Prop". There was a flood threat close to the airport in 1972, while in the following year, the airfield's runways were extended. Obtaining 149,027 passengers by 1974, more considered the airport reliable, as it was improved with the addition of more general services.

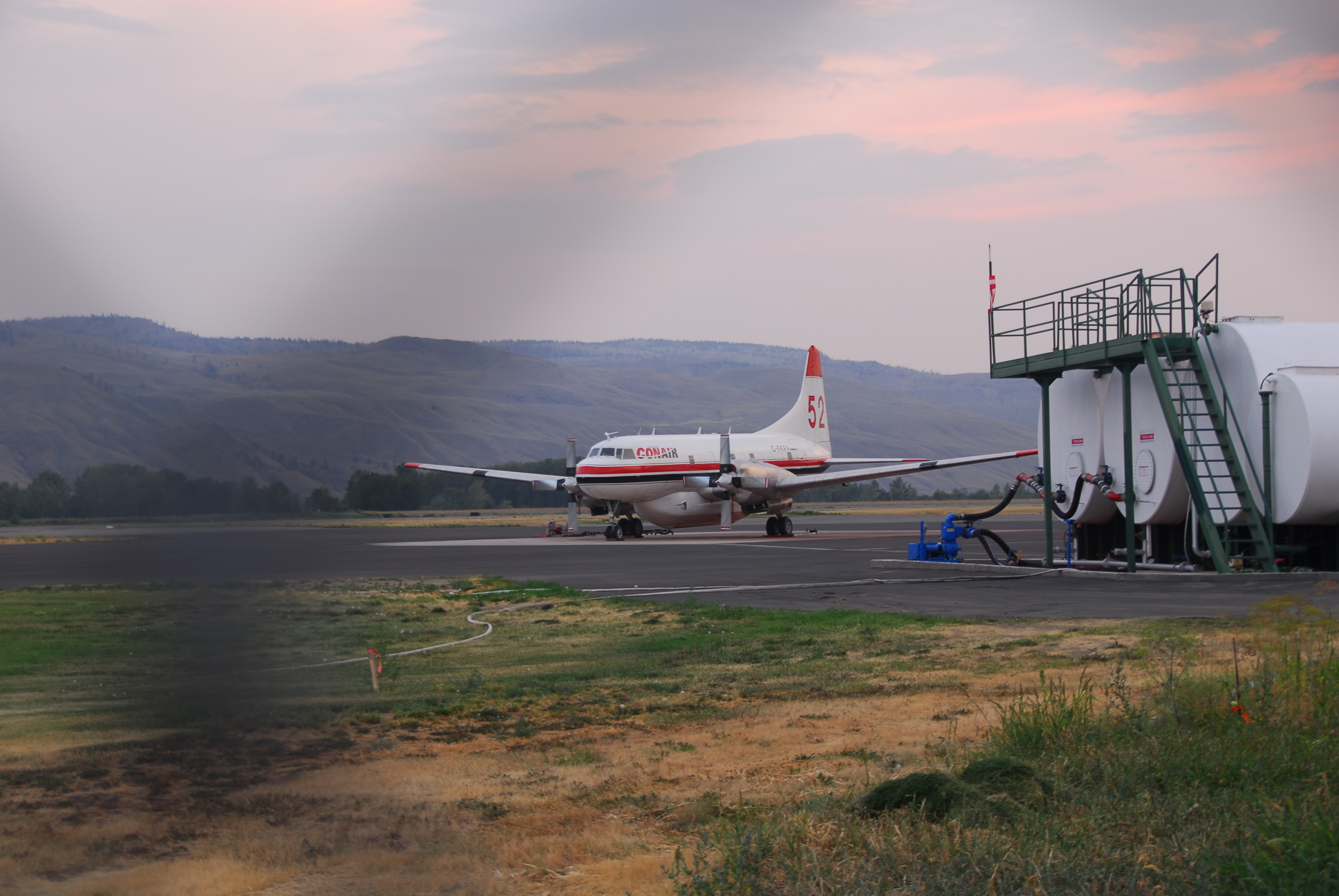
A Convair 580 turboprop fire fighting aircraft operated by Conair, parked on one of the airport's ramps

By 1975, Pacific Western Airlines was operating all flights into the airport with Boeing 727-200 and Boeing 737-200 jetliners with nonstop service to Vancouver, B.C. (YVR) and Calgary, AB (YYC) as well as direct, no change of plane service to other destinations in western Canada.

Kamloops Airport's telecommunication equipment was provided at a separate building in 1977, with 235,600 passengers garnered from it that same year. The airport saw the start of its runways and terminals expansion in 1982 and 1984, while the following year this was completed.

In 1985, Pacific Western was operating all flights from the airport with Boeing 737-200 jetliners with nonstop service to Vancouver, Calgary, Cranbrook, Kelowna and Williams Lake. In addition, the airline was flying direct, no change of plane jet service to Edmonton Municipal Airport (YXD), Prince George, Saskatoon, Penticton and Quesnel with Pacific Western also offering connecting 737 service to Toronto, Winnipeg and Regina via Calgary and as well as connecting 737 service to Victoria and Seattle via Vancouver. According to the April 28, 1985 Pacific Western system timetable, the airline was operating up to seven departures a day with 737 jets from the airport at this time.

During 1986 and 1987, the former terminal building was changed to serve as an operation structure. Besides Pacific Western, Air BC and Time Air served the airport with scheduled passenger flights during the 1980s; all three airlines no longer exist. In 1988, the number of passengers dropped to 137,579. The runway has been used by a wide variety of jet and propeller aircraft over the years from Airbus A320, Boeing 727-200, Boeing 737-200, Boeing 737-400, Boeing 737-600, Boeing 737-700 and British Aerospace BAe 146-200 jetliners to Aeroncas, Aero Commander 500s, Cessna 150s and Grumman TBF Avengers since historical dates. A number of different aerial fire fighting airtanker aircraft have also used the airport including the Convair 580, Grumman S-2 Tracker and Lockheed L-188 Electra. On May 20, 2001, a U.S. Air Force C-32, which is a military version of the Boeing 757-200 and is used for U.S. government VIP flights, was present at the airport.

In 1995, the airport no longer had jet service to either Vancouver or Calgary with these services being operated instead with turboprop aircraft flown by Air BC operating as Air Canada Connector or by Time Air operating as Canadian Airlines Partner via respective code sharing agreements. According to the April 2, 1995 edition of the Official Airline Guide (OAG), both airlines were flying de Havilland Canada DHC-8 Dash 8 turboprops into the airport at this time with Air BC operating British Aerospace BAe Jetstream 31 commuter propjets as well.

However, by 2009, the airport terminal, runway and navigation aids were upgraded with about $25 million, which was funded by the British Columbia government, who gave $4 million, the Canadian government, who gave $6.6 million and the airport itself for the remaining money and announced in 2007; $13 million was used to upgrade the runway, $3 million was used to expand the navigation aid, while $4 million was used for terminal improvements. The city's intention was to expand and upgrade the airport in order for the economy and tourism to expand. City mayor Peter Milobar and members of the Kamloops Indian Band praised its expansion. Its catchment area has a population of approximately 138,000 residents.

Kelowna International Airport, an international airport operated in nearby city of Kelowna, has had a small impact on this airport, since they both share the same catchment area. About 13 percent of the local residents in 2007 choose the Kelowna International Airport over the Kamloops Airport to fly to regional destinations, specifically due to its significant growth. Despite this, some Kelowna residents choose the Kamloops Airport over their local airport.

On May 17, 2020, a Canadair CT-114 Tutor plane from the Snowbirds, Canada's military flight demonstration squadron, crashed in Kamloops shortly after takeoff, injuring the pilot and killing a passenger.

== Facilities ==
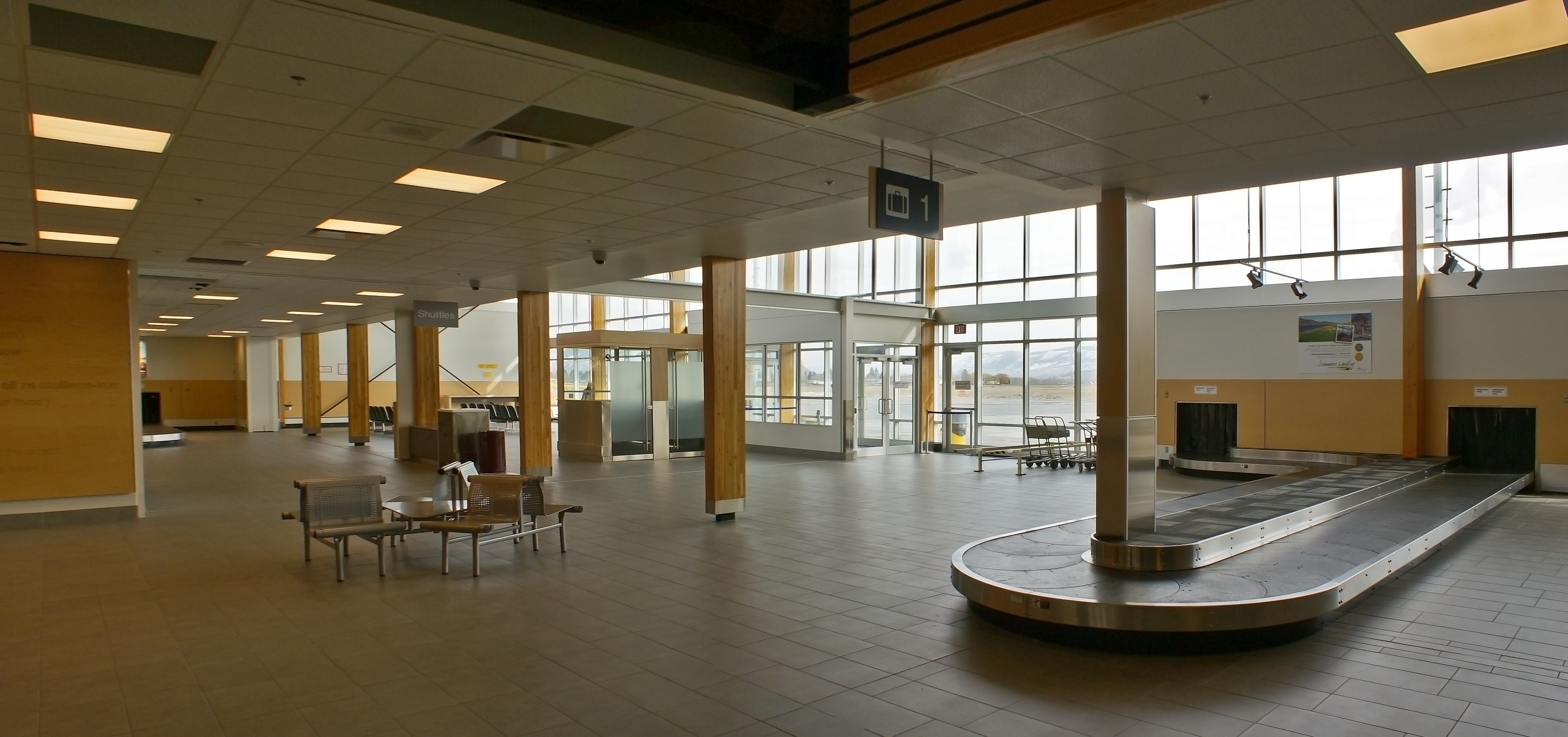
The arrivals area of the Kamloops Airport, which is situated in the Brocklehurst neighbourhood of the city

The airport is located on 3035 Airport Road in the Brocklehurst neighbourhood of north Kamloops, 5 nautical miles (9 km; 6 mi) west northwest of city centre and Selkirk Mountains, situated off Tranquille Road on the Fraser Plateau. It is located 307 kilometres (191 mi) north of the Canada–United States border and opposite the Kamloops Golf & Country Club and Kamloops Lake attractions, which is a lake and country club situated in the city. Paid parking, taxis, car rentals and bus service are available. Car rentals are provided by Budget Rent a Car, Enterprise Rent-A-Car and National Car Rental, which have offices located at the airport. There are 389 parking stalls, and 150 more spaces are expected. Due to its location, the airport is commonly used to gain access to Sun Peaks, British Columbia, and Sun Peaks Resort.

Food and snacks are available at this airport's terminal, as well as a medical facility, accommodation areas and administrative buildings. There are also Canada Revenue Agency and Nav Canada offices. Its terminal, which is 1,500 square metres (16,000 sq ft), has been considered for further expansion, with the North Shore Business Improvement Association helping this expansion. The city's intention was to expand and upgrade the airport in order for the economy and tourism to expand. City mayor Peter Milobar and members of the Kamloops Indian Band praised its expansion. The airport's aircraft obtain their fuel from Shell Canada, which is located on site and serves as an aviation dealer for the Kamloops Airport. The airfield has 2,780 by 49 feet (847 by 15 m) and 8,000 by 148 feet (2,438 by 45 m) asphalt runways aligned 05/23 and 09/27, which are appraised every five years.

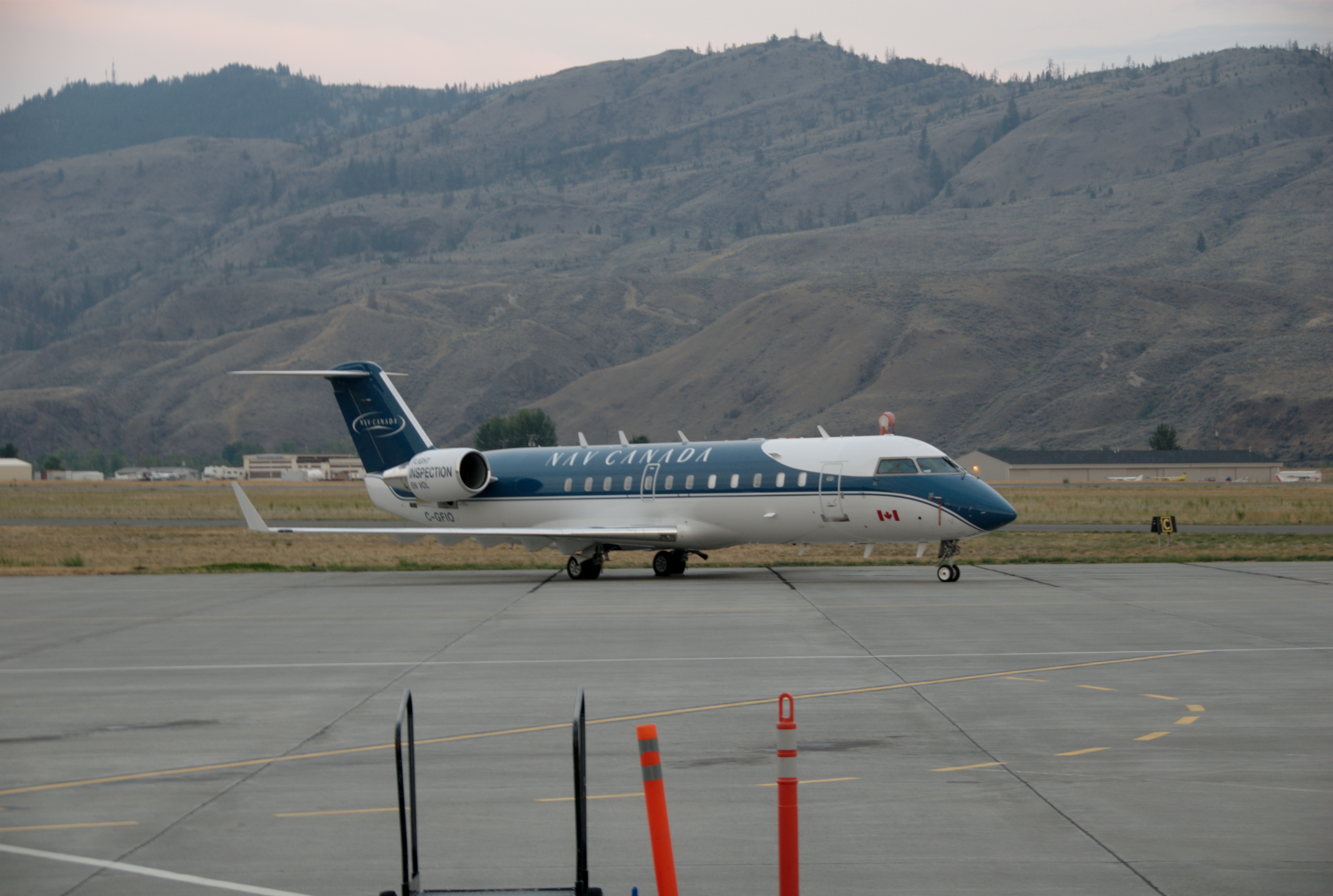
A Nav Canada aircraft sits at the Kamloops Airport, which was expanded to help the local economy and tourism.

Formerly known as the Kamloops Aero Club, the Kamloops Flying Club operates at the airport, which is a club where children receive a flight in an airplane with the pilot and learn about the airplanes themselves. In addition, the flight school Canadian Flight Centre is based on site; the branch based in Boundary Bay, Delta opened a location in Kamloops in May 2012 and uses Cessna aircraft for its lessons. Canadian Helicopters operates a training facility for the Kamloops Airport Other related facilities include Astaris Canada, CC Helicopters, Highland Helicopters and WestAir Aviation. Formerly, Flight Discovery operated as a flight school at the airport, but the owner was deemed a fraud artist.

The Royal Canadian Mounted Police (RCMP) operates an A-Star helicopter at the airport, while the BC Forest Service occasionally uses the airfield with their helicopters. It maintains an aircraft maintenance centre, while aircraft parts are sold by Inland Communications, Mountainaire Services, Progressive Air Services, Pro Aero Engines, Spring Aviation and Westcan Aircraft Sales & Salvage. Meanwhile, packages can be delivered through FedEx at the Kamloops Airport, while custom and security services are provided by Canada Border Services Agency and Garda Security Screening. There is a radio navigation aid provided at the Kamloops Airport which is used by pilots on aircraft coming from other nearby airports to determine their location. The navigation system is owned by Nav Canada, which operate an air traffic control system at it. The Airside Business Park and Fulton Industrial Park are the airport's development areas.

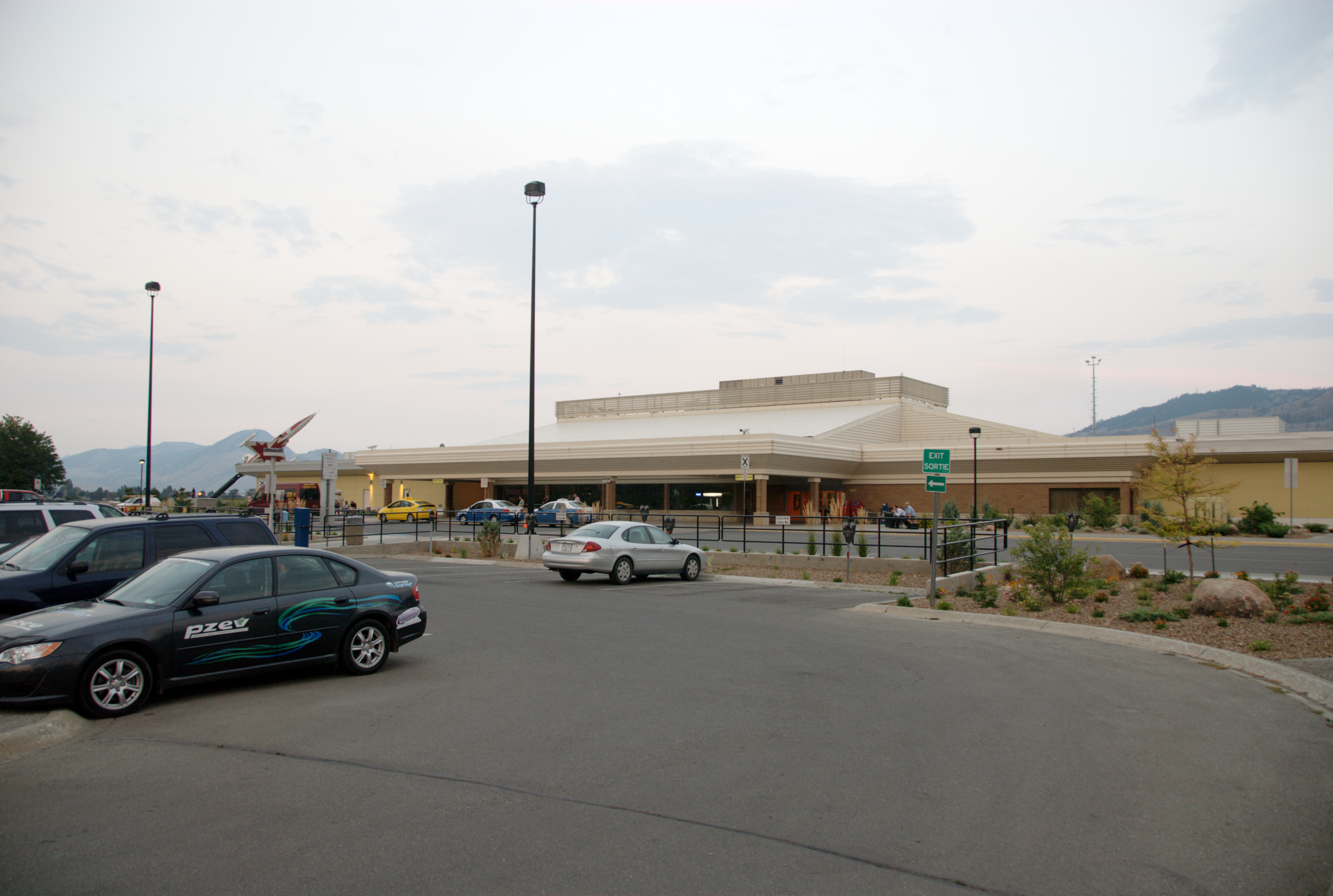
The airport's parking lot, which is used to gain access to its terminal that was expanded by 2009

The local and upcoming weather of Kamloops is observed at this airport's weather station, referred to as the Kamloops Airport Weather Station. Nav Canada has noted that most of the aircraft winds near the Kamloops Airport blow east and west. It has been classified as an airport of entry by Nav Canada and is staffed by the Canada Border Services Agency. An aircraft at this airport may handle no more than 30 passengers. Skydiving can be performed at the airport through Skydive Kamloops. Passengers may also board a courtesy shuttle to other nearby municipalities, such as Blue River, British Columbia.

It has a number of employees available, with Fred Legace serving as airport manager and a number of maintenance workers serving the airport; Ed Ratuski also manages it. The Kamloops Airport has been owned by a number of companies since its opening. It was initially owned by the RCAF, but later there was a proposal led the RCAF to transfer airport ownership to Kamloops itself, hence why the name was changed to the Kamloops Airport, although it is commonly referred to as Fulton Field or Fulton Airport. During the 1990s, Transport Canada, the owner at that time, began a program to transfer ownership of selected regional airports. The ownership of the Kamloops Airport was transferred to the then-new Kamloops Airport Authority Society by August 1997, which is a department of the Kamloops City Council and was composed of its members; it was deemed a commercial operation. Kamloops Airport Authority Society have a contract with the Vancouver Airport Authority, which allow them to manage and operate the airport. It is operated by Kamloops Airport Limited.

== Airlines and destinations ==
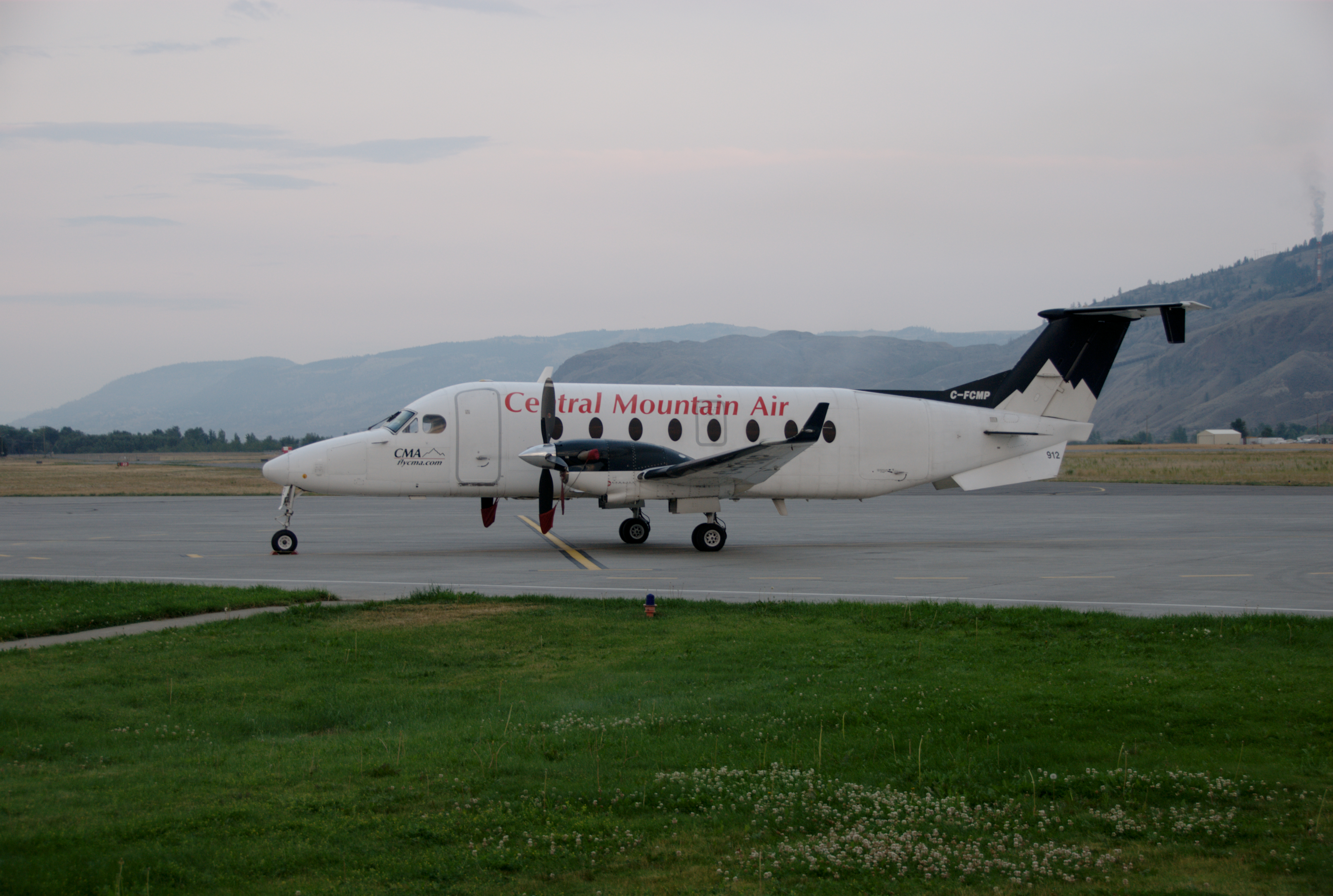
A Central Mountain Air Beechcraft 1900D commuter turboprop aircraft sits at the Kamloops Airport.

As of 2024, Kamloops Airport offers scheduled flights to Calgary International Airport and Vancouver International Airport, which are provided by Air Canada Express and operated by Jazz Air. In addition, Central Mountain Air flights are offered to the Prince George Airport, along with WestJet flights, which were added in November 2009, to the Calgary International Airport and Edmonton International Airport; the latter has been serviced since January 2010. All of these flights are provided daily.

Kamloops Airport has provided flights to several destinations by charter airlines as well, including the Denver International Airport, San Diego International Airport, San Jose International Airport and Seattle–Tacoma International Airport. In 2010, the airport garnered 36,094 aircraft movements, while in 2012, it served approximately 275,424 passengers, representing a 4.4 percent increase from the 2011 number of about 263,290 passengers. The majority of this increase occurred in December 2012, which the Canadian Flight Centre contributed to.

=== Passenger ===
Airlines	Destinations
Air Canada Express	Vancouver
Air North	Seasonal: Vancouver (begins May 28, 2027)
Pacific Coastal Airlines	Victoria
WestJet Encore	Calgary; Seasonal: Edmonton

== Statistics ==
=== Annual traffic ===
Annual passenger traffic
Year	Passengers	% change	Ref
2017	314,364		
2018	351,631	▲11.9%	
2019	361,586	▲2.8%	
2020	123,675	▼65.8%	
2021	104,385	▼15.6%	
2022	257,374	▲146.6%	
2023	311,696	▲21.1%	
2024	310,507	▼0.4%	
2025	293,840	▼5.7%	

== See also ==
- Kamloops Water Aerodrome
