= Goldpan Provincial Park =

Provincial park in British Columbia, Canada

- IUCN category II (national park)
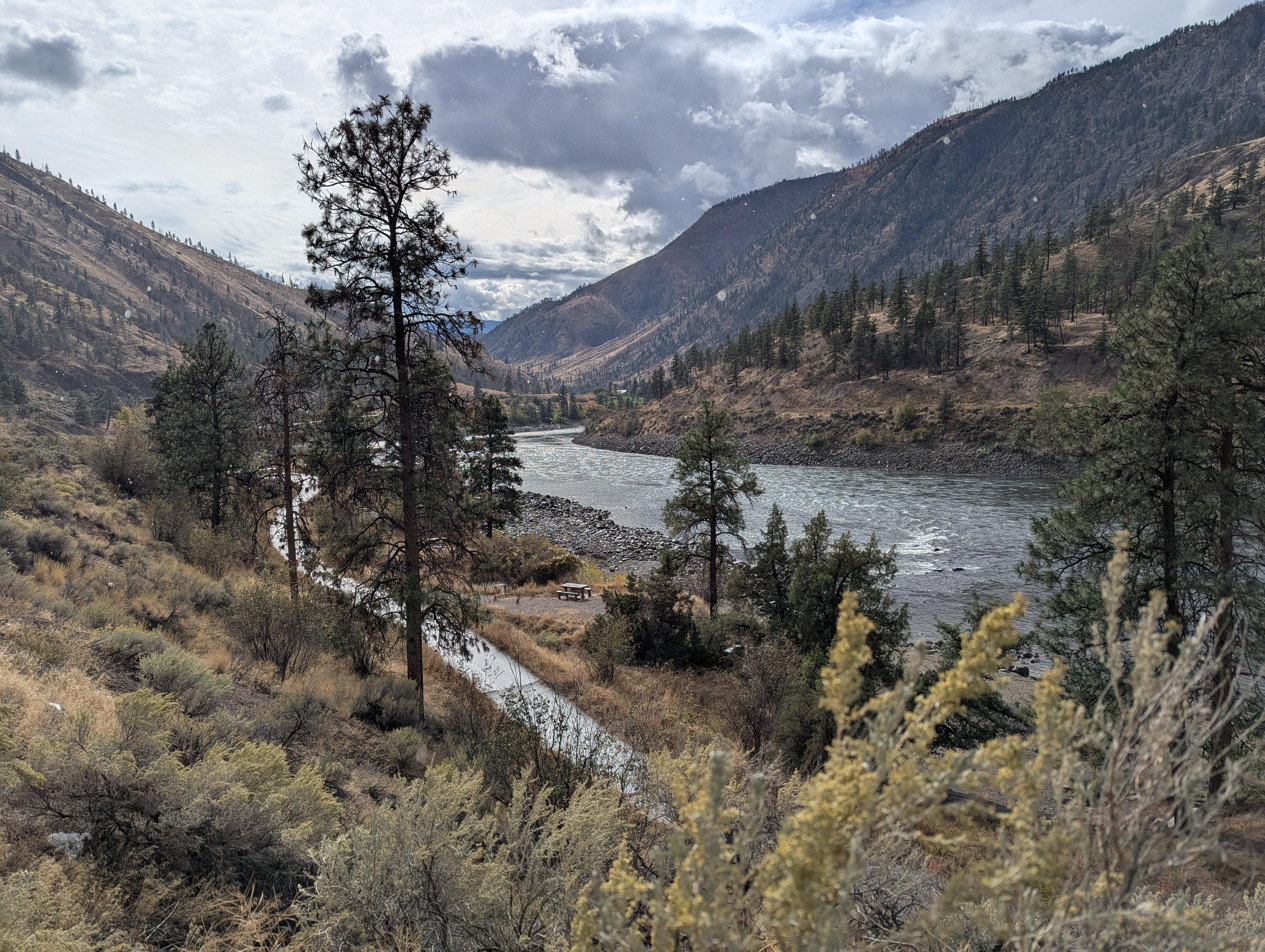

- Location within British Columbia
- Interactive map of Goldpan Provincial Park
- Location: Kamloops Division Yale Land District, British Columbia, Canada
- Nearest city: Lytton, BC
- Coordinates: 50°20′52″N 121°23′24″W
- Area: 5.6 ha (14 acres)
- Established: March 16, 1971
- Governing body: BC Parks

Goldpan Provincial Park is a provincial park in British Columbia, Canada, on the Trans-Canada Highway between Lytton (to the west) and Spences Bridge (to the east), on the Thompson River. The park has camping above the highway and a picnic area and riverfront below.

== See also ==
- Shaw Springs
- Bighorn, British Columbia
