= Juniper Beach Provincial Park =

Provincial park in British Columbia

- IUCN category II (national park)
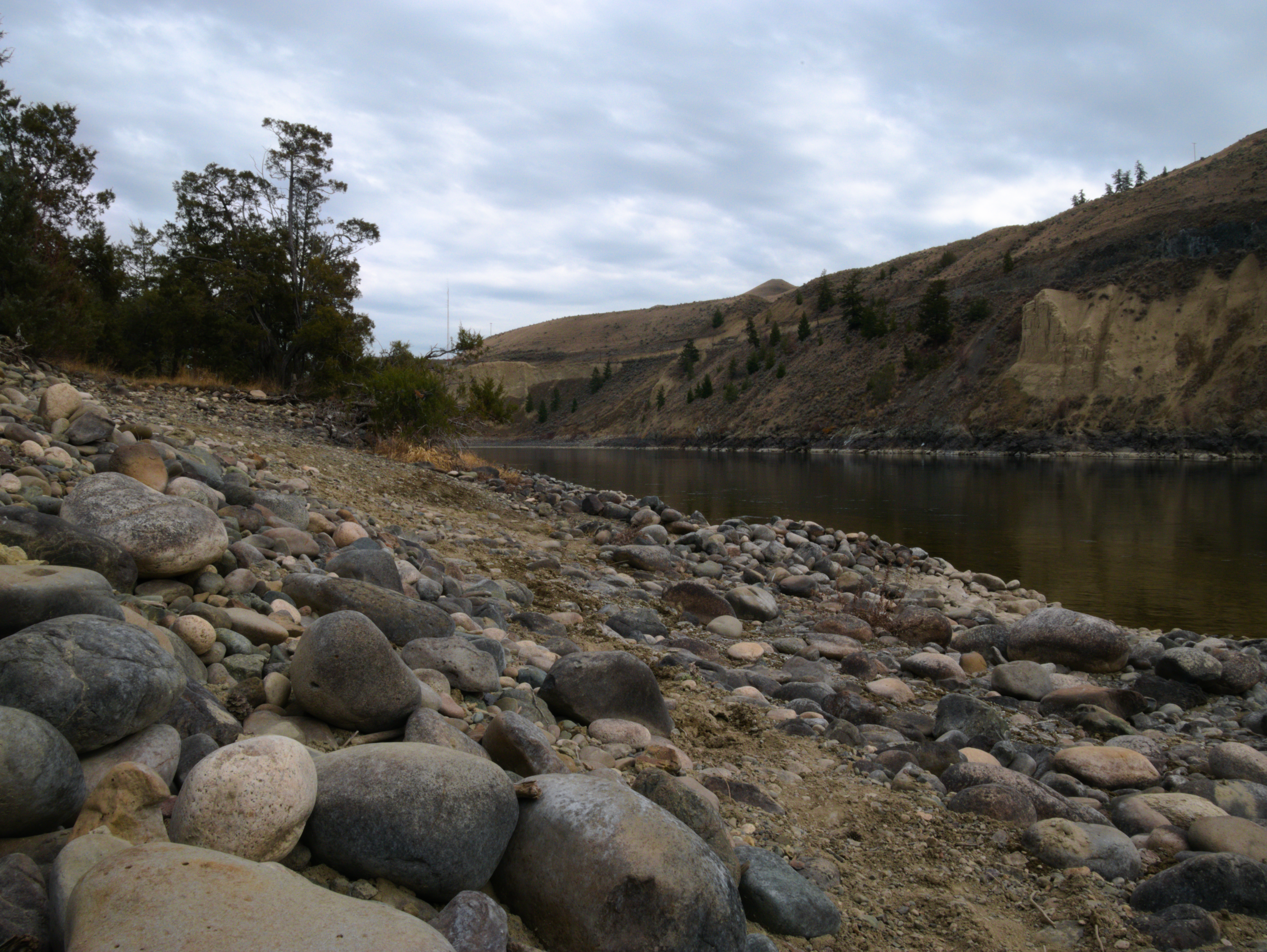
- Lazy Afternoon on the Thompson Riverbank at Juniper Beach Park

- Location within British Columbia
- Interactive map of Juniper Beach Provincial Park
- Location: British Columbia
- Coordinates: 50°47′10″N 121°05′00″W
- Area: 260 ha (640 acres)
- Established: 1989
- Operator: BC Parks
- Website: bcparks.ca/juniper-beach-park/

Juniper Beach Provincial Park is a provincial park in the Thompson Country region of south central British Columbia, Canada. The facility is on the north side of the Thompson River, west of the town of Savona, and downstream from the Kamloops Lake outflow. On BC Highway 1, the locality is by road about 20 kilometres (12 mi) east of Cache Creek and 65 kilometres (40 mi) west of Kamloops.

== Facilities ==
Established in 1989, the 260-hectare (640-acre) park protects the desert ecology. The 30 vehicle-accessible campsites are open from April 26 to October 14. Fishing is popular.

== Fauna ==
Fish species in the Thompson River include trout, steelhead, and salmon. The dry sagebrush areas of the park are home to Western Rattlesnakes and deer. The area attracts many species of birds, including the Western Tanager, Mountain Bluebird and the Northern Oriole.
