= Savona, British Columbia =

Savona
- Community
- Location of Savona in British Columbia
- Coordinates: 50°44′59″N 120°50′04″W
- Country: Canada
- Province: British Columbia
- Region: Thompson Country
- Regional district: Thompson-Nicola

Area
  - Total: 3.89 km^{2} (1.50 sq mi)
- Elevation: 343 m (1,125 ft)

Population (2021)
  - Total: 519
  - Density: 133/km^{2} (346/sq mi)
- Time zone: UTC−07:00 (PT)
- Postal code: V0K 2J0
- Area codes: 250, 778, 236, & 672
- Highways: Highway 1

Savona (/səˈvoʊnə/ sə-VOH-nə) is an unincorporated community in the Thompson Country region of south central British Columbia. The place is on the western end and south shore of Kamloops Lake, adjacent to the outlet into the Thompson River. On BC Highway 1, the locality is by road about 38 kilometres (24 mi) east of Cache Creek and 45 kilometres (28 mi) west of Kamloops. The surrounding countryside is semi-arid grasslands and hills, which support cattle ranching.

== First Nations ==
For thousands of years, First Nations used trails and waterways to travel between hunting, fishing and trading areas. Prior to the 1860s, French was probably more common in parts of the interior than English. Consequently, Boute du Lac (meaning foot of the lake) Indians was the name initially assigned to this indigenous group. Since the Hudson's Bay Brigade Trail crossed the Thompson at Kamloops, these people would have experienced limited exposure to the French-speaking fur trade era.

During the 1860s, the Savona Ferry Indians became the new name and the people gravitated to the Deadman Valley to build a small church and few houses. Having previously wintered in the valley and at the lake outlet, the establishment of the reserve in the late 1860s, revised the name to the Deadman Creek Band. In 1985, the traditional name of Skeetchestn Band was reinstated. Archaeological sites are scattered throughout the area. The main reserve is northwest of Savona on the Deadman River.

== Ferries and bridges ==
About 1858, during the Fraser Canyon Gold Rush, François Saveneux established a ferry across the fast current of the Thompson. The small ferry could likely carry two packhorses accompanied by riders. Herded cattle would swim across. Place names quickly anglicized, resulting in the Savona spelling. Lieutenant Mayne's 1859 sketch of the Fraser Canyon identifies but does not name the ferry. The family lived on the south shore and François died in 1862. His widow continued the ferry, which Ned Roberts took over in the mid-1860s, residing on the north shore. James Uren was the operator when the government assumed control in 1870. He built a large scow to carry a four-horse rig.

The 1875 flood snapped the rope, which was replaced by a steel cable in 1876. High water set the ferry adrift in 1878. The next year, when the cable broke, two occupants were saved, but one drowned. The 192-metre (630 ft) long bridge, with a 43-metre (140 ft) Howe truss main span, opened in 1884. This swing bridge experienced severe flood damage in 1888 and complete destruction in 1894. When reinstated in 1895, the ferry remained free, but a charge was levied for after hours service. In the late 1890s, hordes travelling to the Klondike Gold Rush created a busy period.

In 1903, high water sent the ferry to destruction downstream. Almost a year later, a replacement was installed.

In 1906, the second bridge opened 457 metres (500 yd) east of the 1884 site. Three small spans flanked three 50-metre (164 ft) ones. After being largely swept away in 1908, the third bridge was quickly built upon the existing piers. In 1929, a two-lane 213-metre (700 ft) steel bridge, about 400 metres (437 yd) downstream, replaced the wooden bridge. The next year, the former bridge was dynamited.

Widening of the 1929 bridge to 7 metres (24 ft) began in 1957 and was completed the following year.

In 1972, a pickup truck and trailer jackknifed on the bridge. After colliding with a semi-trailer on the bridge in 1979, an RV plunged about 30 metres (100 ft), killing the two occupants. In 1982, a semi-trailer crashed through a guardrail on the bridge and fell to the riverbed, killing the driver.

In 1991, a two-lane concrete bridge replaced the one-lane Bailey bridge over the railway track at the Savona East access. In 1993, Cortez Construction adopted the "Highline" method to install the girders for the river bridge replacement.

== Roads and steamers ==
The Big Bend Gold Rush of 1865 prompted the construction of the wagon road from Cache Creek to Savona. Gustavus Blin Wright built the 37-kilometre (23 mi), 5-metre (18 ft) wide road, which opened in April 1866. A stage coach service began immediately. That month, ten mules hauled the boiler for the SS Marten over this route. The boat hull had been built at Shuswap Lake and floated down to Savona for installation of the machinery. Launched in May 1866, this first steamboat on Kamloops Lake provided a link to Seymour on Shuswap Lake, from where prospectors proceeded to the Big Bend.

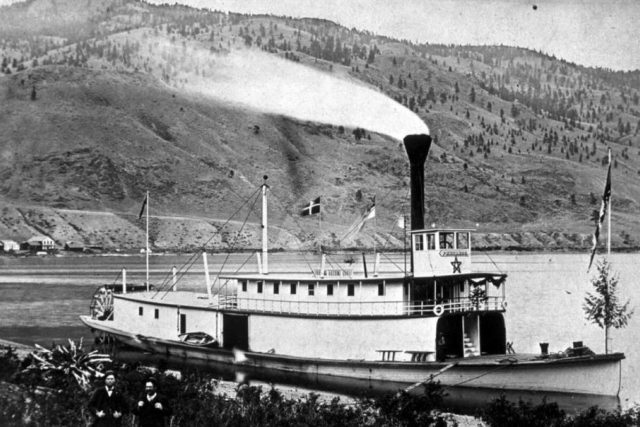
SS Peerless, Savona (north shore berth), 1885

In 1869, the wagon road from Savona to Kamloops was completed.

In 1872, the Canadian Pacific Railway (CP) built the small steamer SS Kamloops to carry supplies for surveyors from Savona. Mara and Wilson, Kamloops merchants, bought the Marten from the Hudson's Bay Company (HBC) in 1875. The next year, the vessel smashed into the HBC warehouse, demolishing the east wing. In 1877, the Marten was wrecked.

After the railway opened, a steamer service from Kamloops still operated for over a decade.

By 1915, a good road existed south to Lower Nicola.

In 1931, a new piece of road known as the eight-mile hill, about halfway between Cherry Creek and Savona, opened to traffic.

In 1953, the 11-kilometre (7 mi) realignment from the highway bridge to the viewpoint, which included the Savona bypass, opened.

Largely paved by 1937, the road westward was replaced by a more elevated highway in the 1960s.

Prior to Greyhound Canada ceasing all interprovincial routes in 2018, an application the prior year included a service reduction via Savona. Ebus provides a three times weekly bus service.

== Earlier north shore community ==
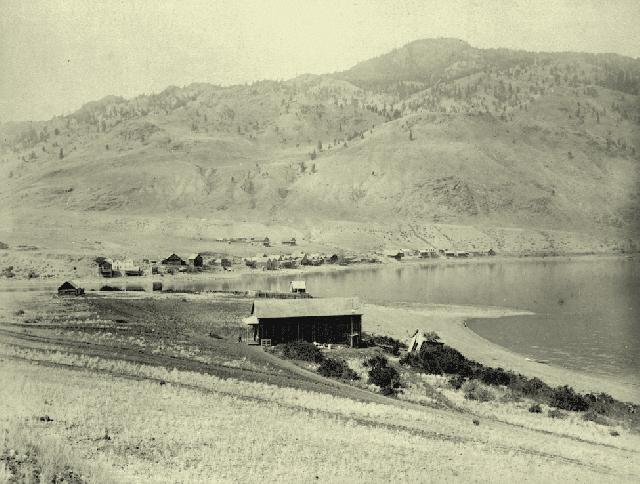
South shore warehouse in foreground and north shore settlement in background, Savona, c.1885

The settlement grew adjacent to the HBC post. In 1867, the post office opened. Named Savona's Ferry, the place was a postage zone boundary. When the Colony of British Columbia changed from sterling to decimal currency in 1867, the postage rate to this boundary was 12.5 cents and beyond was 25 cents. The post office was closed 1870–1881.

In 1870, James Uren purchased the W.H. Kay stopping house, which he refurbished and later extended. In the early 1870s, James Sabiston operated a store. Uren managed the HBC warehouse 1873–1878, which held freight awaiting lake transport to Kamloops. About 1882, he renamed the lodgings as Savona House. John Jane's general store, which opened in 1881, soon faced competition from the various stores across the lake which sprang up to serve the CP construction crews. Around this time, Abraham Thomas opened a saloon, which became known as the Central Hotel. In fall 1883, James A. Newland and Adam B. Ferguson opened a hotel called Lakeview House, which thrived during the CP construction period. The location of the cemetery on the north shore suggests its existence by this time.

In 1886, Barnard's Express relocated headquarters to Ashcroft, James Uren died in England, Ferguson bought out his hotel partner, and many of the residences lay abandoned. Ferguson closed the hotel in 1891, and one account claims the building was hauled across the frozen lake, possibly to be used as a family residence. That year, John Jane closed his store. By then, the north shore settlement was largely deserted. Thomas may have continued his hotel as late as 1904.

== Earlier south shore community ==
No buildings existed in 1882 at what became the CP townsite in 1884. H.F. Keefer's general store, a little log structure at a site which for several years was known as Keefers Point, was the first business. Many more followed but soon disappeared once the railway construction moved on. When the jail was built, John Kirkup became the initial jailer and constable.

The Savona brewery, which opened in 1885, burned down in 1889. Laid out in 1885, the townsite never rose to significance but remained a small hamlet.

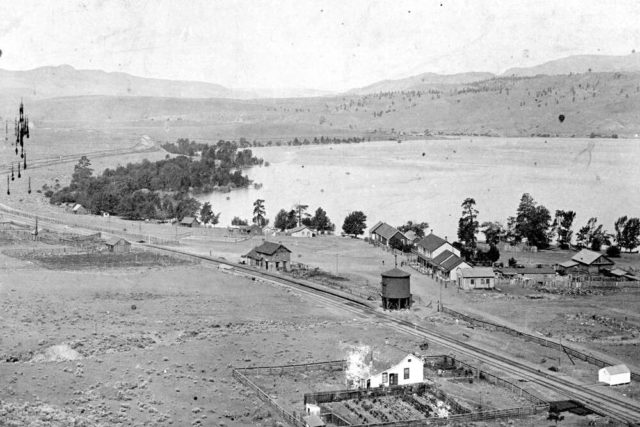
CP Station, water tower and settlement, Savona, 1898

In 1886, Mat Finlay took over management of the Van-Horne Hotel from Mr. Crotty. In 1891, Ferguson acquired the Finlay hotel, which he renamed Lakeview House, and John Jane opened his large new store. Successive storekeepers ensured the ongoing presence of a general store in the community. An attempt to start a school around 1889 appears to have failed, probably due to insufficient students. In 1894–95, the first school opened in a former brewery residence that was dragged uptown. The first proper schoolhouse was erected in 1900.

In 1904, a community hall opened. In 1909, brothers Jack and Jake Christian bought the hotel.

Prior to 1910, the names Savona's Ferry, Van Horne, Savonas, and Savona, were used interchangeably until settling upon the latter. Although a provincial constable was resident at that time, it is unclear whether the presence had been intermittent since the 1880s.

In 1911, Savona became a Canadian Northern Railway (CNoR) construction base, which temporarily boosted the population. That year, the new 21-by-9-metre (70 by 30 ft) community hall opened.

In 1913, a tender was published for a new jail/courtroom/constable's quarters. Around 1915, St Hilda's Anglican church was built. A resident constable remained until the mid-1920s. In 1924, fire destroyed the hotel.

Advertised for sale In 1930, the 1913 jail complex was sold and converted in 1932 to a private residence. In 1937, a new one-room school replaced the old one. In the later 1930s, Savona Lodge and Savona Hotel were established.

In 1953, St Hilda's Anglican Church was moved across the CP tracks to a more central location. About 1954, BC Hydro transmission lines introduced electricity to the area. That summer, Dey's new store and café opened on the new bypass, replacing the building destroyed by fire months earlier.

In 1959, a voluntary fire department was established. In 1963, the new firehall opened and the department received a new pumper truck.

By the 1960s, the CP water tank was no longer used by trains but remained for several more years to supply Savona prior to the installation of its own water system. The new parish house of St Hilda's church was dedicated in 1965.

BC Tel extended the toll-free calling areas in 1982 and 1990. In 1998, the remaining customers on party lines switched to direct dialing.

== Railways ==
=== Canadian Pacific ===
CP chose the name Port Van Horne (after William Cornelius Van Horne, CP general manager) for the proposed railway siding, steamboat landing, warehouses, and community. In December 1884, the eastward advance of the CP rail head from Port Moody halted about one mile east.

CP assigned little prominence to the new name, preferring to use some variation of Savona. Assumedly, a spur connected to the landing, from where supplies were forwarded farther up the lake. Restarted in the summer, the tracklaying reached Kamloops in July 1885.

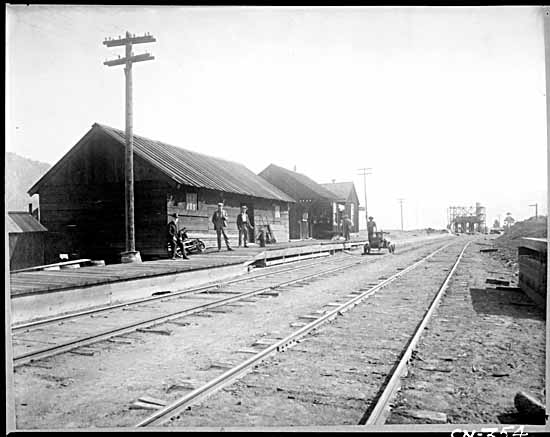
CP Station and unfinished water tower, Savona, 1885

Andrew Onderdonk was awarded the government contracts for Emory Bar–Savona in 1880 and Port Moody–Emory Bar in 1882 and the CP contract for Savona–Craigellachie in 1884 (although the location of the latter would depend upon where the two advancing rail heads met).

Built in 1884, the station and agent's residence were unimpressive and have been mistakenly identified as the standard-design (Bohi's Type 5) single-storey station building with gable roof and dormers (identical to Keefers). The replacement in the late 1890s was the standard-design Plan H-I-20-6 (Bohi's Type 1) split level station building, which was destroyed in 1969 or 1972. (The latter was similar to Gleichen station).

In 1898, a train struck a man, who sustained fatal injuries.

By 1900, the station was a significant shipping point for livestock.

In 1908, a man died on falling from a train about 11 kilometres (7 mi) east.

In 1910, a brakeman, who was jolted from the top of a car, when the emergency brakes inexplicably engaged, received severe lacerations to the head and was knocked unconscious. A court awarded $3,000 in damages. Later that year, a freight train ran over a man, causing fatal injuries.

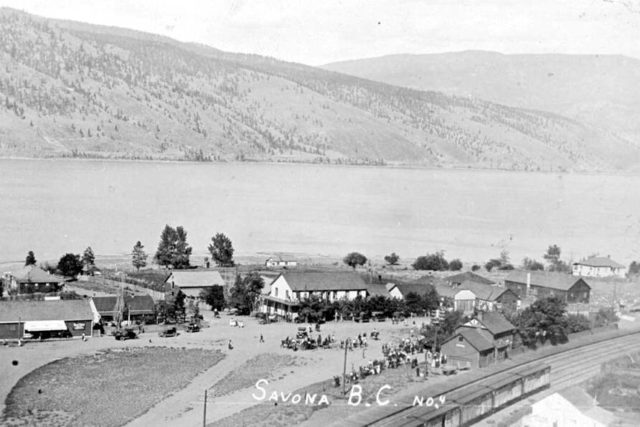
Settlement and CP Station, Savona, 1915

In 1911, a locomotive and several passenger cars derailed about 6 kilometres (4 mi) east. That year, CP erected a new freight shed.

In 1912, a locomotive struck a landslide and plunged 61 metres (200 ft) down an embankment. Two men died, several cars were derailed, and significant track was destroyed.

In 1913, a passenger alighting from a moving train slipped on the icy platform and fell under the cars, where he sustained fatal injuries. A week later a westbound passenger train struck and killed an individual.

In 1939, when the westbound royal train made a water stop, King George VI and Queen Elizabeth came out onto the rear observation platform of their car and the crowd sang God Save the King, accompanied by a single violin.

In 1957, a locomotive and boxcar derailed.

In 1969, 25 units of a westbound freight train derailed about 1.6 kilometres (1 mi) west.

In the 1970s, a westbound freight train derailed just to the west. On rolling down an embankment into the river, boxcars spilled their contents. Not realizing that the passing flotsam included colour TV sets, some men fishing downstream mistakenly assumed it was all garbage. A submerged TV later recovered by the official salvager worked perfectly.

In 1980, a train ran over and killed an inebriated woman sleeping on the track.

In 1981, a man walking along the track sustained fatal injuries when struck by a train.

In 1987, a train killed a man sitting on the track.

In 1995, a major train wreck occurred.

In 1998, five cars of an eastbound train derailed, severing the tracks.

In 2008, a car loaded with potash toppled over onto its side.

The CP Savona passing track is 2.4 kilometres (7,725 ft).

CP Train Timetables (Regular stop or Flag stop)
	Mile	1887	1891	1898	1905	1909	1912	1916	1919	1929	1932	1935	1939	1943	1948	1954	1960	1964	1965	1966
Ashcroft	47.3	Regular	Regular	Regular	Regular	Regular	Regular	Regular	Regular	Regular	Regular	Regular	Regular	Regular	Regular	Both	Regular	Regular	Both	Flag
Semlin	37.3								Flag	Flag	Flag	Flag	Flag	Flag	Flag	Flag				
Pennys	32.0	Regular	Regular	Flag	Flag	Flag														
Walhachin	32.0						Both	Both	Both	Both	Regular	Regular	Regular	Regular	Regular	Regular	Both	Both		
Savonas	25.2	Regular	Regular	Regular	Regular	Regular														
Savona	25.2						Both	Both	Both	Both	Both	Both	Both	Both	Both	Both	Regular	Regular	Flag	
Munro	19.7					Flag	Flag	Flag	Flag	Flag										
Cherry Creek	14.6	Regular	Flag	Regular	Flag	Flag	Flag	Flag	Flag	Flag	Flag	Flag	Flag	Flag	Flag	Flag				
Tranquille	8.6	Flag	Flag		Flag	Flag	Flag	Flag	Flag	Flag	Flag	Flag	Flag	Flag	Flag	Flag				
Kamloops	0.0	Regular	Regular	Regular	Regular	Regular	Regular	Regular	Regular	Regular	Regular	Regular	Regular	Regular	Regular	Both	Regular	Regular	Regular	Regular

=== Canadian National ===
During the early 1910s, a CNoR hospital existed at Savona.

In April 1914, about 150 members of the IWW marched to confront construction strike-breakers on the north shore at Savona, where a large contingent of armed provincial police and special constables was stationed. A locomotive enlisted to clear the strikers, bumped a leader causing head injuries, a broken leg, and a few broken ribs. In the confusion, 48 strikers were arrested. Convicted of vagrancy, they received one to three months in jail.

In December 1914, the westward advance of the CNoR rail head from Kamloops passed through Savona.

The Canadian National Railway (CN) passing track at Savona on the predominantly single-track subdivision was 0.9 kilometres (2,997 ft) in 1916, progressively extending to the current 4.1 kilometres (13,350 ft).

Like the CP water tower, the CN tank held 150,000 litres; 33,000 imperial gallons (40,000 US gal).

In 1928, three members of a section gang were buried alive under a rockslide at a nearby tunnel entrance.

In 1931, Smith Curtis sustained some broken bones on being struck by a freight train.

The 1948 flood undermined a pier of the CN Deadman River bridge. When the pier toppled, two 27-metre (90 ft) steel spans crashed into the river. The reopening was a year later.

In 1971, a train struck a teenager on the CN Savona Bridge, causing extensive injuries.

In 1980, a train struck an inebriated man lying beside the track, causing multiple fractures of the knee.

In 1983, a freighthopper, who fell from a boxcar, met with nine days in jail.

The CN train station was razed in 1980.

CN and Official Guide Train Timetables (Regular stop or Flag stop)
	Mile	1916	1923	1927	1933	1936	1938	1943	1947	1950	1956	1960
Ashcroft	2715.8	Regular	Regular	Regular	Regular	Both	Flag	Both	Both	Both	Both	Flag
McAbee	2707.9	Regular	Regular	Regular		Flag		Flag		Flag	Flag	
Anglesey	2703.0	Regular	Regular	Regular		Flag		Flag		Flag	Flag	
Walhachin	2699.5	Regular	Regular	Regular		Flag		Flag		Flag	Flag	
Savona	2692.6		Regular	Regular		Flag		Flag		Flag	Flag	
Copper Creek	2687.7	Regular	Regular	Regular		Flag		Flag		Flag	Flag	
Frederick	2680.7		Regular	Regular		Flag		Flag		Flag	Flag	
Tranquille	2674.8	Regular	Regular	Regular	Regular	Both	Both	Both	Both	Both	Both	Regular
Halston	2667.9		Regular	Regular		Flag		Flag		Flag	Flag	

^a. The twice weekly Kamloops–Boston Bar way-freight, introduced in 1932, is omitted from the Official Guide timetables.

== Forestry ==
Established in 1906, the Savona Land and Lumber Company opened the Monarch Lumber Co mill in 1907, which had an electric generation plant. The average daily cut was 10,668 metres (35,000 ft) in 1908, increasing to 21,336 metres (70,000 ft) in 1909. About 30 employees lived in the company boarding house. A 1911 fire at the mill destroyed a shed and contents and about 152,400 metres (500,000 ft) of finished lumber in the yard.

In spring 1912, the Canada United Lumber Co was incorporated to take over various lumber interests, including the Savona mill. About this time, fire destroyed the mill. Rebuilding was completed in the fall. Sold to Annis Lumber in 1914, the sawmill closed in 1918.

Savona Timber opened a new mill around 1947 and merged with Ashcroft Lumber around 1964.

A log, which rolled from a truck being unloaded in 1968, killed a man. That year, Evans Products acquired the business, which comprised a sawmill, plywood plant, planer mill and chipping facilities.

A 1976 fire gutted the Savona Timber offices. In 1978, a mill worker was electrocuted.

Reduced demand caused temporary lay offs and shorter work weeks in 1980, 1981, and 1983.

By 1990, Ainsworth Lumber had purchased the operations. During 1997 and 1998, Ainsworth upgraded the plywood facility.

Temporary lay offs and reduced hours returned in 2000, 2001, and 2008.

A 2009 fire caused no major structural damage to the mill. Months later, Ainsworth Lumber permanently ceased operations.

In 2010, Aspen Planers purchased the property. Trading as Savona Specialty Plywood, production resumed the next year.

== Natural gas transmission ==
During 1957, Westcoast Transmission installed a 183-metre (600 ft) natural gas pipeline across the Thompson, immediately southwest of the current highway bridge.

Savona is Compressor station No. 7.

As one of the compressor stations in western Canada with a waste heat recovery system, Savona has a 5 MW zero-emission facility operated by Enbridge.

In 2020, a new gas cooler was added to the plant.

== Notable people ==
- Smith Curtis (1855–1949), lawyer and politician, resident.
- Michelle Good (1956– ), author, resident.
- Jean-Marie Le Jeune (1855–1930), missionary, resident.

Census population: Savona
Year	Pop.	±%
1951	125	—
1956	306	+144.8%
1961	532	+73.9%
1966	508	−4.5%
1971	670	+31.9%
1976	609	−9.1%
1981		—
1986	358	—
1991	541	+51.1%
1996		—
2001		—
2006		—
2011*	519	—
2016	538	+3.7%
2021	519	−3.5%
Source: Statistics Canada * Revised figure

== Later community ==
Seasonal or permanent residences have replaced the old lakeshore motels, campgrounds and auto courts that dotted the waterfront. Several commercial enterprises provide employment opportunities.

In 2005, a new 131-square-metre (1,410 ft^{2}) wood frame public library was erected. The next year, the heritage centre opened inside the former library building.

The water supply system, which serves about 300 customers, was largely constructed in 1977 and upgraded in 1996, 2010, and 2018. A municipal sewer system does not exist. In 2006, the regional district took over the system from the local improvement district.

In 2009, curbside garbage collection was implemented. In 2011, broadband internet was introduced.

In 2012, controversy surrounded the dismissal of the entire team of volunteer medical emergency responders by the fire chief.

In 2013, sewage again overflowed at a trailer park, which highlighted neighbourhood concerns regarding noisy summer parties and a rezoning which permitted 12 RV units. The property has been used intermittently as a campground since the 1960s.

In 2015, a new boat launch opened.

Savona infrastructure includes a post office, library, volunteer fire department, Anglican church, grocery store, two gas stations, and the Lakeside Country Inn.

Savona Elementary is part of School District 73 Kamloops/Thompson.

== Leisure ==
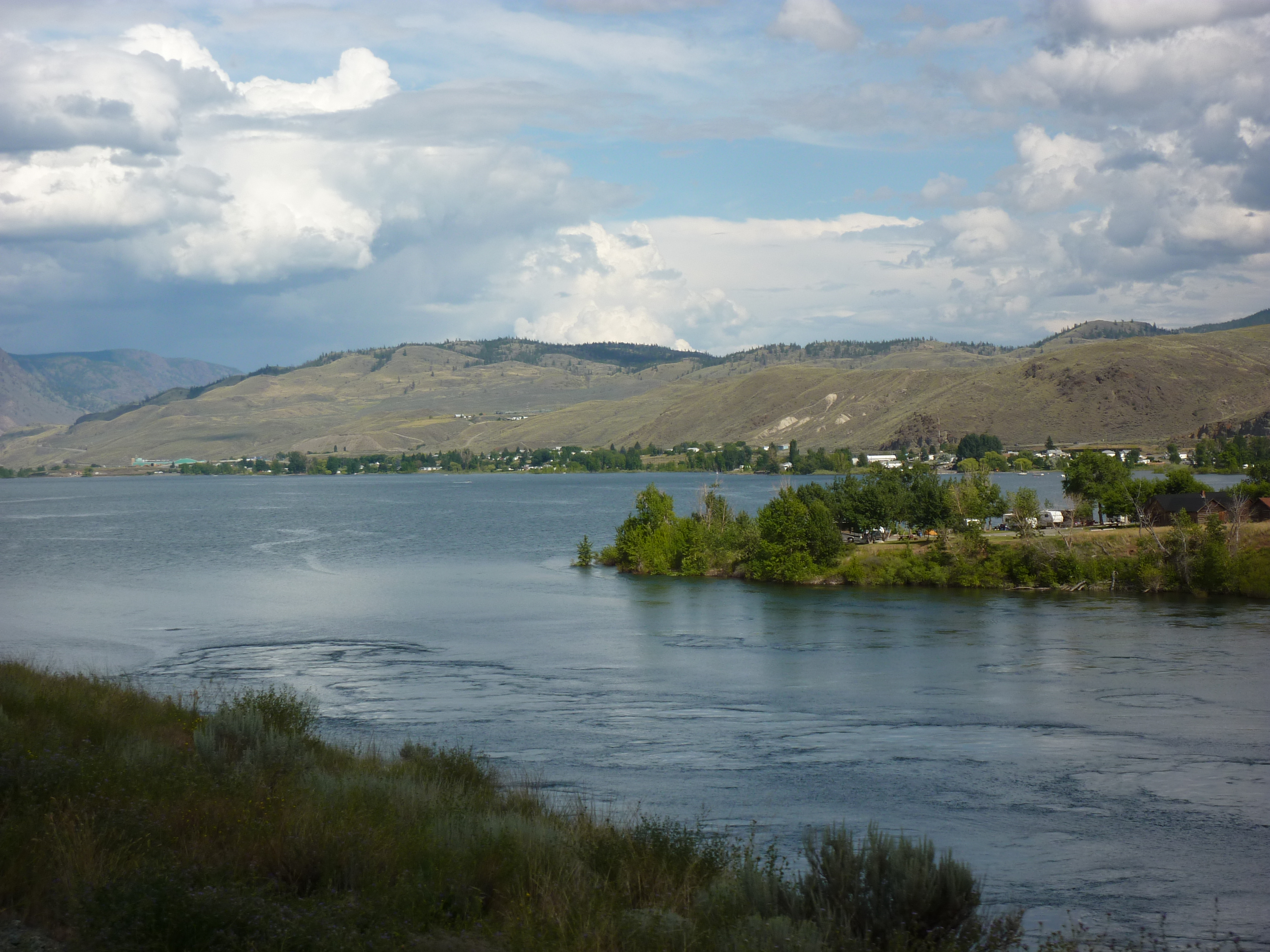
Southeastward view across lake to Savona, 2011

The Savona Balancing Rock rests upon a clay hoodoo. The Kamloops Lake Viewpoint has picnic tables and pit toilets. The Savona Caves are found on Savona Mountain. The Savona Lakeshore Park lies within the hamlet.

Painted Bluffs Provincial Park, known for multi-coloured rockfaces, is east of Copper Creek.

Campgrounds exist at Steelhead Provincial Park immediately west, Juniper Beach Provincial Park farther west, and Tunkwa Provincial Park to the south.

== Filming location ==
Scenes from the following were shot in the Savona area:

- An Unfinished Life (2005).
- The Andromeda Strain (miniseries) (2008).
- 2012 (2009).
- Hard Ride to Hell (Video 2010).
- Juggernaut (2017).

== See also ==
- List of crossings of the Thompson River
