= Steelhead Provincial Park =

Provincial park in British Columbia, Canada

- IUCN category II (national park)
- Location within British Columbia
- Interactive map of Steelhead Provincial Park
- Location: British Columbia, Canada
- Nearest city: Kamloops
- Coordinates: 50°45′10″N 120°52′13″W
- Area: 0.38 km^{2} (0.15 sq mi)
- Established: July 15, 1993
- Governing body: BC Parks

Steelhead Provincial Park is a provincial park in the Thompson Country region of south central British Columbia, Canada. The facility is at the west end of Kamloops Lake near the town of Savona. On BC Highway 1, the locality is by road about 38 kilometres (24 mi) east of Cache Creek and 45 kilometres (28 mi) west of Kamloops.

Established in 1993, Steelhead (Sk'emqin) Park is on land that holds significant archeological value. The site had been used by the Secwepemc people for 7,000 to 10,000 years, and in more recent history was the site of a pioneer homestead, ferry landing, and stagecoach depot. A few historical buildings and a cemetery can be found within the park boundaries.

The facility has 44 campsites (10 having water and power connections), picnic tables, showers, and flush toilets. The 38-hectare (94-acre) setting offers mountain and lake views and fishing. The park is open from May 1 until October 12.
