= Tranquille River =

River in British Columbia

Coordinates: 50°43′09″N 120°32′02″W

Tranquille River is a river located in the Thompson Country region of British Columbia. The river is located on the north side of Kamloops Lake almost 8 miles (13 km) west of Kamloops, near Tranquille, Kamloops. The river was discovered as gold-bearing in 1852. The river has been mined and the total value of gold mined is estimated at $250,000.

The river was named by fur traders of the Hudson's Bay Company for the Secwepemc Chief Pacamoos and nicknamed Tranquil for his quiet easy manner.

== See also ==
- List of rivers of British Columbia
