= Batchelor Hill =

Hill in British Columbia, Canada

Coordinates: 50°44′00″N 120°25′00″W

Batchelor Hill 733 m (2405 ft) prominence: 128 m, is a hill overlooking the city of Kamloops, British Columbia, Canada, immediately northwest of the city and north of the neighbourhood of Brocklehurst. It is the namesake of the Batchelor Hills a.k.a. Batchelor Heights neighbourhood and also of the small Batchelor Range, which runs north from it on the side of the Kamloops Plateau but does not include it.

== Name origin ==
Named early in this century for Owen Salisbury Batchelor, having previously been known as "Le Petit Garcon Salisbury" for the man in charge of the HBC horse range. Batchelor had farmed the upper Salmon River valley in 1885, but moved to Kamloops ten years later, and became jailer until succumbing to Klondike fever. On his return he ran several mining ventures, including the erection of a stamp mill just below these hills. He died in 1933. His son commented that the family fortune would have been made had Dad saved the money spent on gambling and prostitutes throughout the district.
