= Brocklehurst, Kamloops =

Coordinates: 50°42′00″N 120°25′00″W

Brocklehurst is a neighbourhood in the western area of Kamloops, British Columbia, Canada. Brocklehurst is bordered by the Thompson River to the south, North Shore to the east, Tranquille to the west, and the Batchelor hills and Batchelor Heights aka Batchelor Hills to the north. The community is named after Ernest Brocklehurst, from Liverpool, England who lived in the area between 1896 and 1907.

Brocklehurst, which briefly existed as a district municipality in its own right from 1971 until amalgamation with Kamloops in 1973, is the largest of the city's neighbourhoods, accounting for 16% of the city's population. The Brocklehurst area (or Brock, as referred to by its residents), is the warmest and most hospitable of the micro-climates in the city of Kamloops. There can be as much as a 4 degree Celsius increase from Brock to Aberdeen, all within the city of Kamloops.

== History ==
Brocklehurst was first settled before 1896. In 1908, the B.C. Fruitlands claimed the land and made it into fruit farms. In the early 1930s a big percentage of land was sold to German Settlers that lived on the Western side of Brocklehurst. In 1907 the Tranquille Sanatorium was established, access to here passed through Brocklehurst on Ord Road. They made a small village which included a Church, School and a small graveyard. To this day the school and graveyard still remain. The Kamloops Airport was built west of the German Village in 1939.

The first school was established in 1930; initially, it was a small wooden shack used by the German Settlers. With population growing in "German Town", a newer school was needed, and a 2-room schoolhouse (Brocklehurst Elementary School, later named Crestline Elementary School) was built in 1933. This school later closed in the 70s. In the 1960s, many other larger elementary schools were built (George Hilliard, Little Brock, Parkcrest, Happyvale, A.E. Perry and Kay Bingham Elementary School). A secondary school arrived in 1968 on 985 Windbreak Street.

In 1971, the District Municipality of Brocklehurst which only lasted up until 1973 during this time period many changes were made such as more land going from Fruit Farms to Suburban. The abandoned remains of the German Settlers Village were destroyed during this time, including over 30 shacks from Townsend Place to the Airport. Former water reservoirs for the German People were drained in 1983, and the land was later sold to Suncor Energy Co. This field is now empty lot with many bike trails, and an old graveyard.
