= Tranquille, Kamloops =

Neighbourhood of Kamloops, British Columbia

Coordinates: 50°43′00″N 120°31′00″W

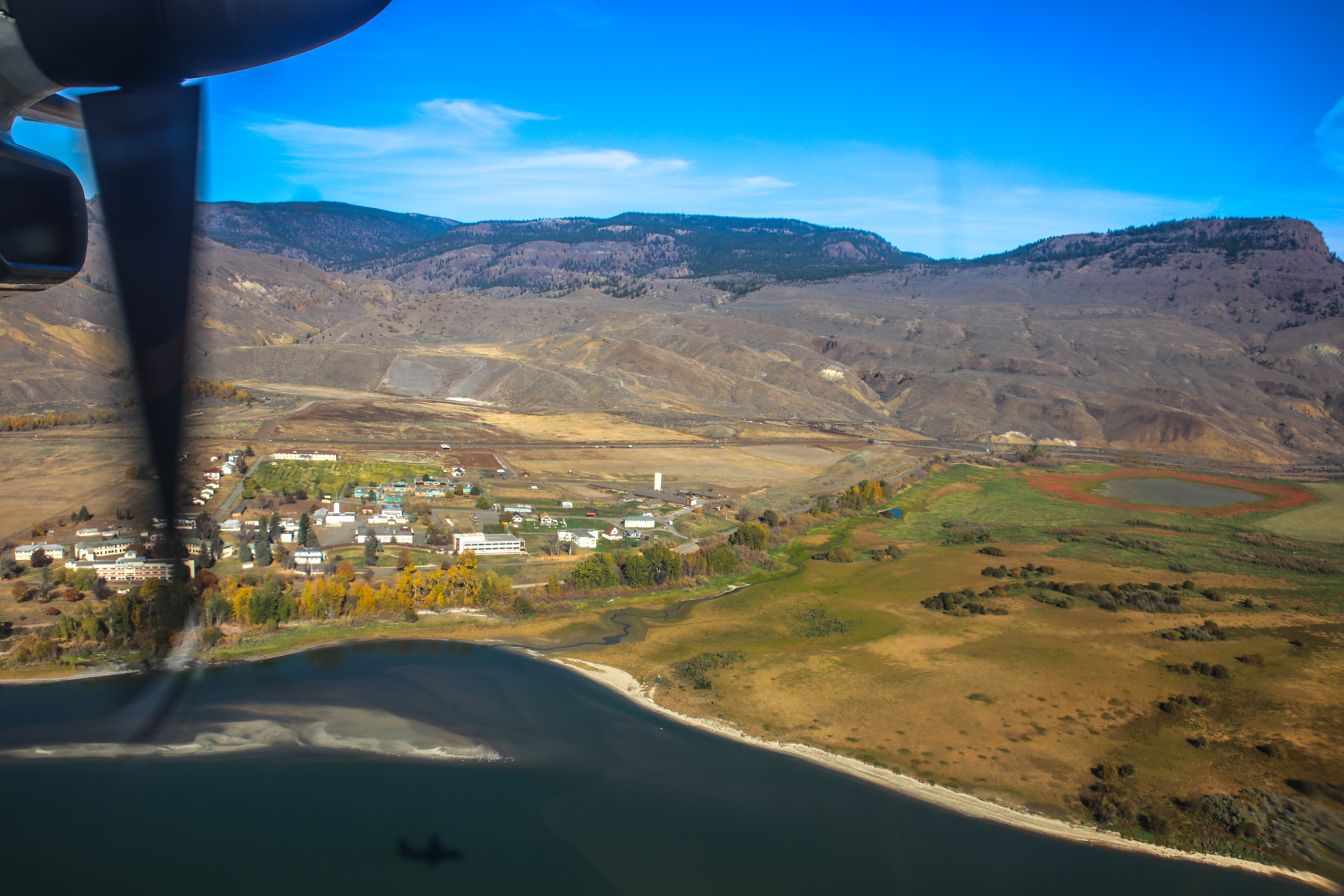
Tranquille farm

Tranquille (Shuswap: Pellqweq'wíle) is a neighbourhood of the City of Kamloops, British Columbia, Canada, located on the northeast side of Kamloops Lake. It is the site of the Tranquille Sanatorium, a home for the mentally disabled, a tuberculosis sanatorium, and originally the Kamloops Home for Men.

The name originated from Chief Pacamoos of the lower Shuswap tribe who was nicknamed Tranquil by fur traders, as noted in 1827 by Archibald McDonald.
