= Shaw Springs =

Location of Shaw Springs in British Columbia

Shaw Springs is owned and operated by the Fandrich Family, an RV and Camping resort, on the shores of the Thompson River with 40 acres of land. 22 full service RV sites and rustic campsites are present here. This campground and RV Site is open year round for visitors through the canyon.

Shaw Springs is located 15 minutes East of Kumsheen Rafting Resort and is where all of our full day ‘Legendary Thompson River’ trips stop for lunch and where the half-day ‘Devils Gorge Run’ trip begins

== Name origin ==
The name derives from a natural spring at the location, Shaw Spring, being named for its first water rights owner, William. H. Shaw in 1930. The spring itself is on the west side of the Thompson river. William & wife Rose established and operated Shaw Springs Resort for many years until passing it to one of their 7 children William Shaw Jr. known as Billy. The property was next passed to brother Hunter Shaw and ultimately sold to its current owners in the early 1980s. The CPR designated its rail stop here as Drynoch. Mr Shaw sought to have it renamed to Shaw Springs in 1953, but his appeal was rejected by the CPR and the Geographical Names Board.

== History ==
The location was first used in the 1880s by the CPR as a camp for workers during the construction of the Canadian Pacific Railway. Many small buildings were erected on the site to house the men and were later renovated into cabins and became part of the resort the Shaw family developed. Mr.and Mrs. William Hugh and Rose Shaw originally homesteaded Shaw Springs in the late 1920s after purchasing the rights to the fresh water spring on the river right. A suspended pipeline crossing the river was built and the water was pumped over to the river left to irrigate the gardens and provide fresh drinking water. The old wooden cased pipes were replaced some time in the 1990s after a forest fire destroyed the original lines. The Trans Canada Highway slices a ribbon through the now 38 acre parcel sustaining three working alfalfa fields. The Shaw family owned the property for a little more than 50 years and sold it to the current owners in 1980s. The buildings have benefited from extensive renovations and expansion at the hand of the current owners and there are still a few of the original cabins in use. The restaurant and RV park are still open from spring until the end of the fishing season.

== See also ==
- List of communities in British Columbia

== Rockhounding ==
Shaw Springs and environs is a popular rockhounding location for agates and opals. Formal stakings for mining purposes are located southeast at 50°17′40″N 121°19′28″W, with formal explorations taking place in 2009–2011.
