= Thompson River =

River in British Columbia, Canada

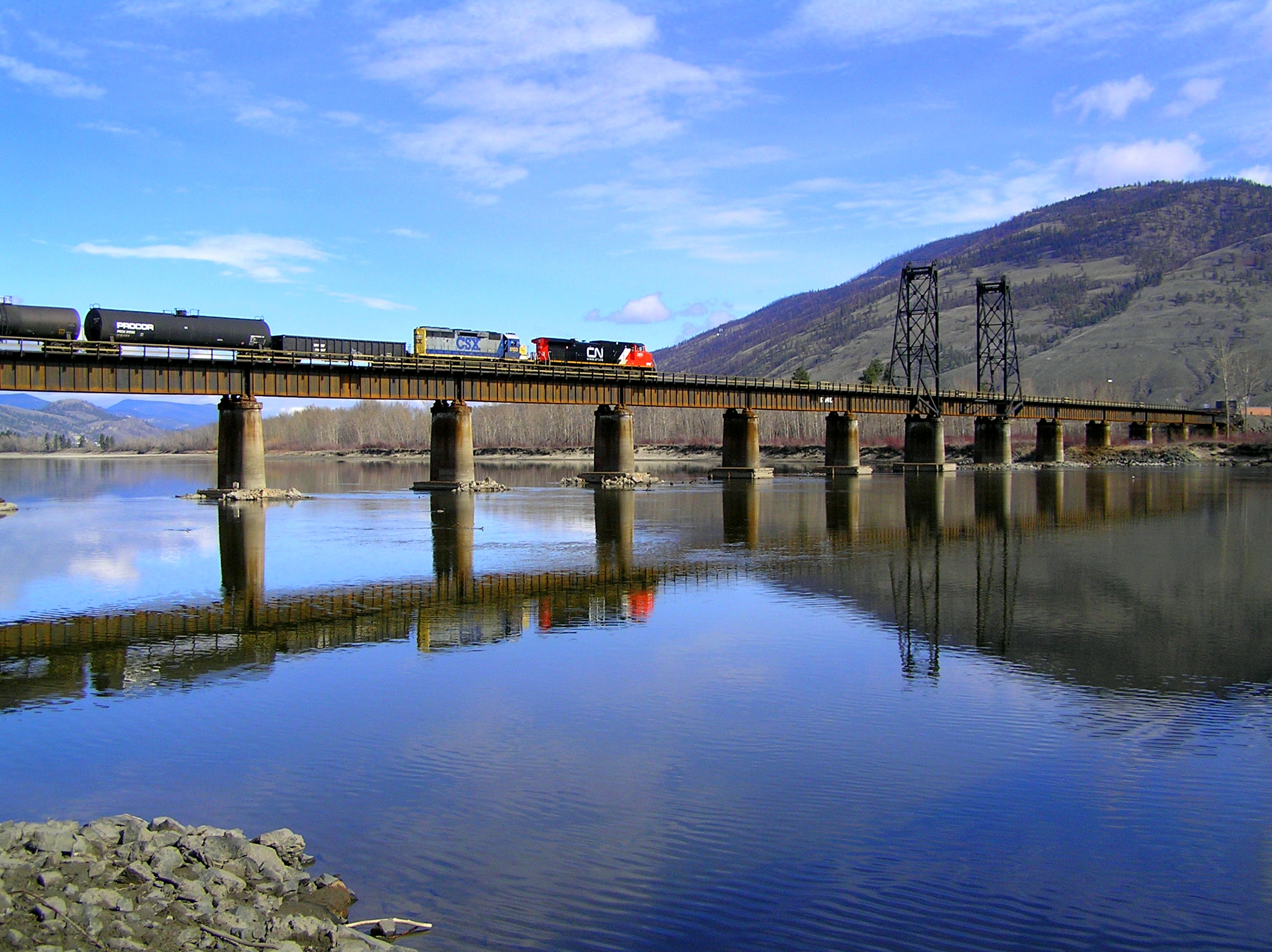
- A CN railway crossing of the North Thompson River in Kamloops

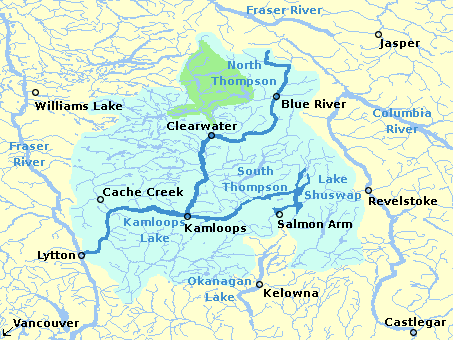
- A map of the Thompson River's watershed

Location
- Country: Canada
- Province: British Columbia
- Land District: Kamloops Division Yale

Physical characteristics
- Source: Confluence of the North and South Thompson Rivers
  - location: Kamloops
  - coordinates: 50°40′49″N 120°20′36″W
  - elevation: 345 m (1,132 ft)
- Mouth: Fraser River
  - location: Lytton
  - coordinates: 50°14′07″N 121°35′00″W
  - elevation: 195 m (640 ft)
- Length: 489 km (304 mi)
- Basin size: 56,000 km^{2} (22,000 sq mi)
- Discharge
  - location: Spences Bridge
  - average: 773 m^{3}/s (27,300 cu ft/s)
  - minimum: 171 m^{3}/s (6,000 cu ft/s)
  - maximum: 4,200 m^{3}/s (150,000 cu ft/s)

The Thompson River is the largest tributary of the Fraser River, flowing through the south-central portion of British Columbia, Canada. The Thompson River has two main branches, the South Thompson River and the North Thompson River. The river is home to several varieties of Pacific salmon and trout. The area's geological history was heavily influenced by glaciation, and the several large glacial lakes have filled the river valley over the last 12,000 years. Archaeological evidence shows human habitation in the watershed dating back at least 8,300 years. The Thompson was named by Fraser River explorer, Simon Fraser, in honour of his friend, Columbia Basin explorer David Thompson. Recreational use of the river includes whitewater rafting and angling.

== Geography ==
=== South Thompson River ===
The South Thompson originates at the outlet of Little Shuswap Lake at the town of Chase and flows approximately 55 kilometres (34 mi) southwest through a wide valley to Kamloops where it joins the North Thompson. Highway 1, the Trans-Canada Highway and the mainline of the Canadian Pacific Railway parallel the river. Little Shuswap Lake is fed by the Little River, which drains Shuswap Lake, which is fed by several rivers and creeks.

=== North Thompson River ===
The North Thompson originates at the toe of the Thompson Glacier in the Cariboo Mountains west of the community of Valemount and flows generally south towards Kamloops and the confluence with the South Thompson. For most of its length, the river is paralleled by Highway 5 and the Canadian National Railway (both of which cross the river a couple times). The North Thompson passes by several small communities, the most notable being Blue River, Clearwater and Barriere.

The North Thompson picks up the Clearwater River at the town of Clearwater. The Clearwater, the North Thompson's largest tributary, drains much of Wells Gray Provincial Park.

A notable feature along the North Thompson is Little Hells Gate, a mini-replica of the much larger rapid on the Fraser downstream from the mouth of the Thompson. About 17.4 kilometres (10.8 mi) upstream from the small town of Avola, the river is forced through a narrow chute only about 30 feet (9.1 m) wide creating a rapid that resembles the Fraser's famous rapid.

=== Mainstream ===
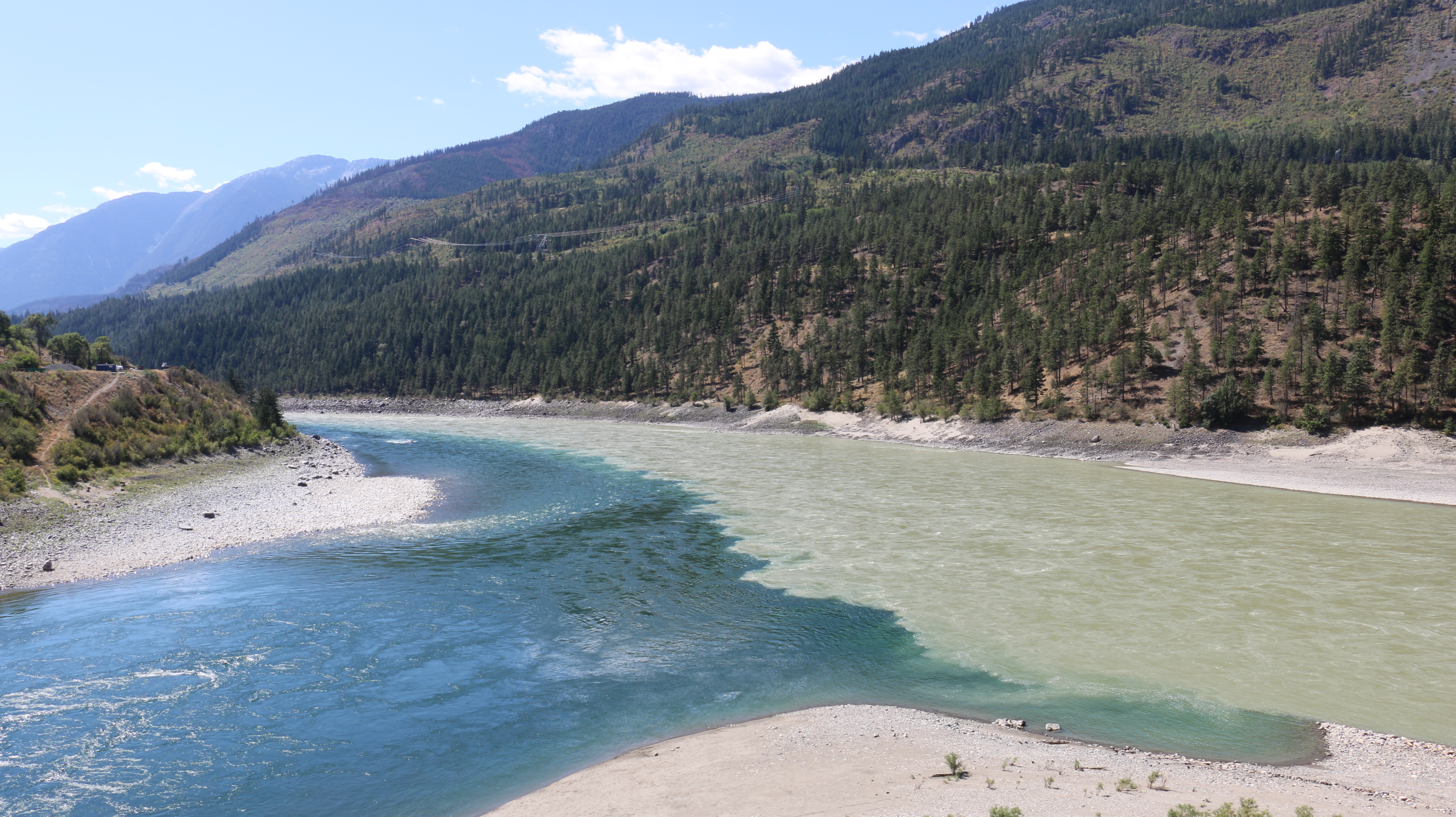
The darker waters of the Thompson meet the Fraser at Lytton.

At Kamloops, the combined Thompson River flows 15 kilometres (9.3 mi) from the confluence of the North and South Thompson Rivers before reaching Kamloops Lake, which is roughly 30 kilometres (19 mi) in length, ending at the town of Savona. From there it flows in a meandering course westwards through a broad valley area. At Ashcroft, the Thompson Canyon begins and the river turns southwestward to its confluence with the Fraser. The river is paralleled by the Trans-Canada Highway, the Canadian Pacific Railway and the Canadian National Railway.

From Ashcroft to Lytton, the river is completely confined within Thompson Canyon, making for spectacular scenery. The Thompson River joins the Fraser River in Lytton. There is a striking stretch of dark black cliffside just downstream from Ashcroft and visible from the Logan Lake-Ashcroft highway is officially named the Black Canyon. Just below the town of Spences Bridge was the site of a major rail disaster in the early 20th century. Communities along this section are Bighorn, Shaw Springs, and Goldpan.

== Geology ==
The Thompson River valley has existed in some form for at least 50 million years; however, for much of its history, it did not drain to the southwest into the Pacific Ocean as it does today. Geologists believe water from the river flowed northward, through the Cariboo region, eventually entering what is the modern-day Peace River drainage basin and ending up in the Arctic Ocean. This flow direction is estimated to have ended approximately 2 million years ago, as the Pleistocene era of heavy glaciation began.

=== Glacial lakes ===
During the era of massive glaciers in the Thompson River valley, water from the area likely drained eastward, through the Shuswap Lake area into what is now the Columbia River drainage. This flow direction was influenced by large ice buildups in the Thompson valley, which created extensive glacial lakes. Two large glacial lakes, Glacial Lake Thompson and Glacial Lake Deadman, occupied much of the modern river's course from 13,000 BCE to 10,000 BCE. These deep, narrow, ribbon-shaped lakes held large volumes of water; Glacial Lake Thompson held nearly 84 cubic kilometres (20 mi^{3}) at its highest point. The lake stretched from Spences Bridge in the west to the eastern reaches of Shuswap Lake, as well as far up the northern reaches of the North Thompson river valley. The last large glacial lake, Lake Deadman, was drained by a catastrophic ice dam failure, called a jökulhlaup, in about 10,000 BCE. This event released as much as 20 cubic kilometres (4.8 cu mi) of water southwest into the Fraser River system, possibly depositing sediments as far away as the Salish Sea, more than 250 kilometres (160 mi) away. From this point, the Thompson waters stopped flowing eastward into the Columbia River system, and the river became a tributary of the Fraser.

=== Landslides ===
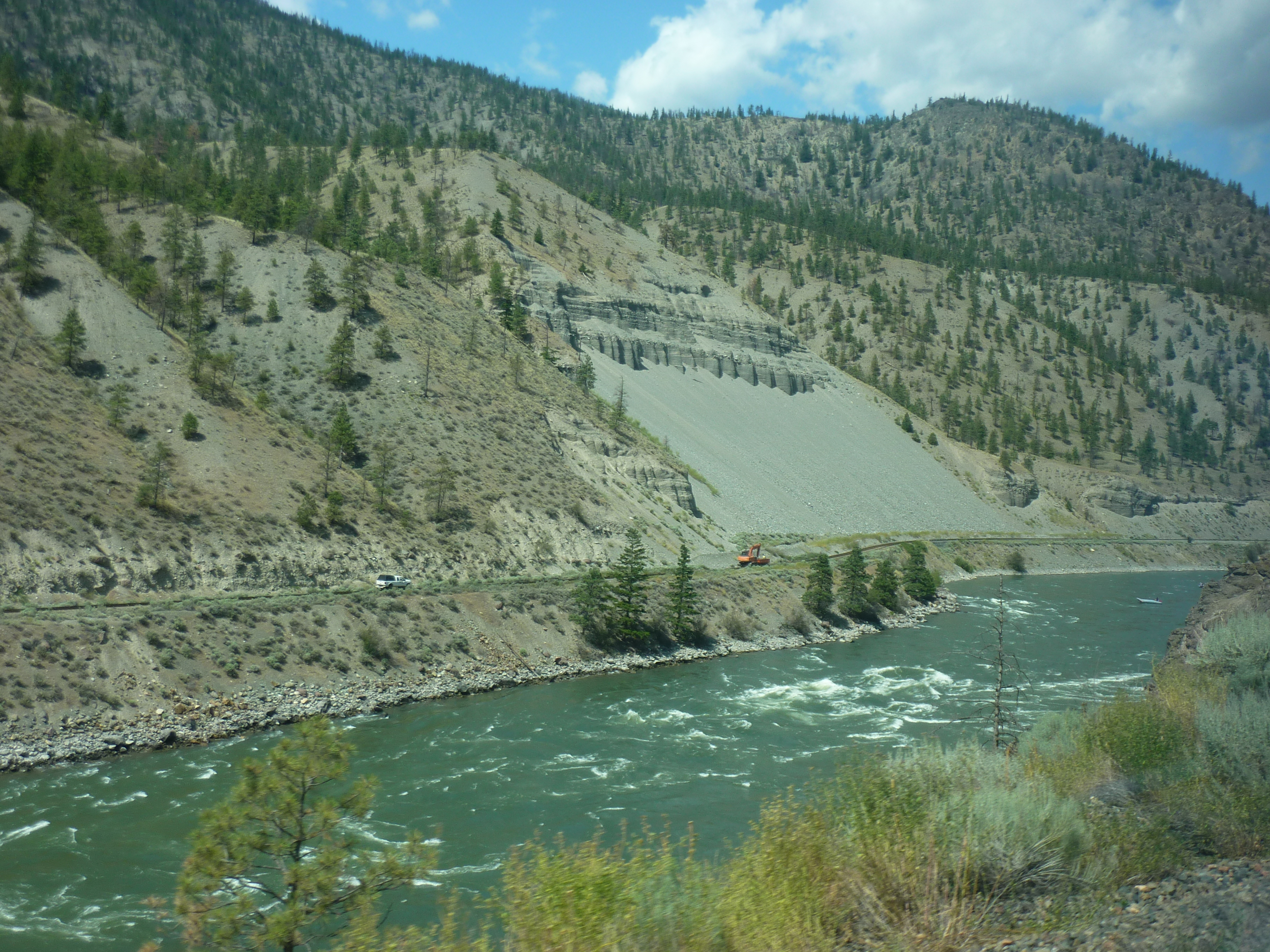
Remnants of a landslide near the railway in the lower Thompson River valley

Because of large deposits of glacial silt, sand, and gravel in the lower Thompson River valley, large landslides are common. The area downstream from the town of Ashcroft is prone to landslide events; eight major events between 1880 and 1982 have been recorded. Several of them have obstructed the river, and caused large, temporary lakes. An 1880 slide caused the formation of a short-lived lake over 14 kilometres long with a maximum depth of 18 metres. These slides have caused major damage to the rail lines and farming operations in the river valley. Heavy irrigation has been blamed for some of the events.

== History ==
=== Aboriginal peoples ===
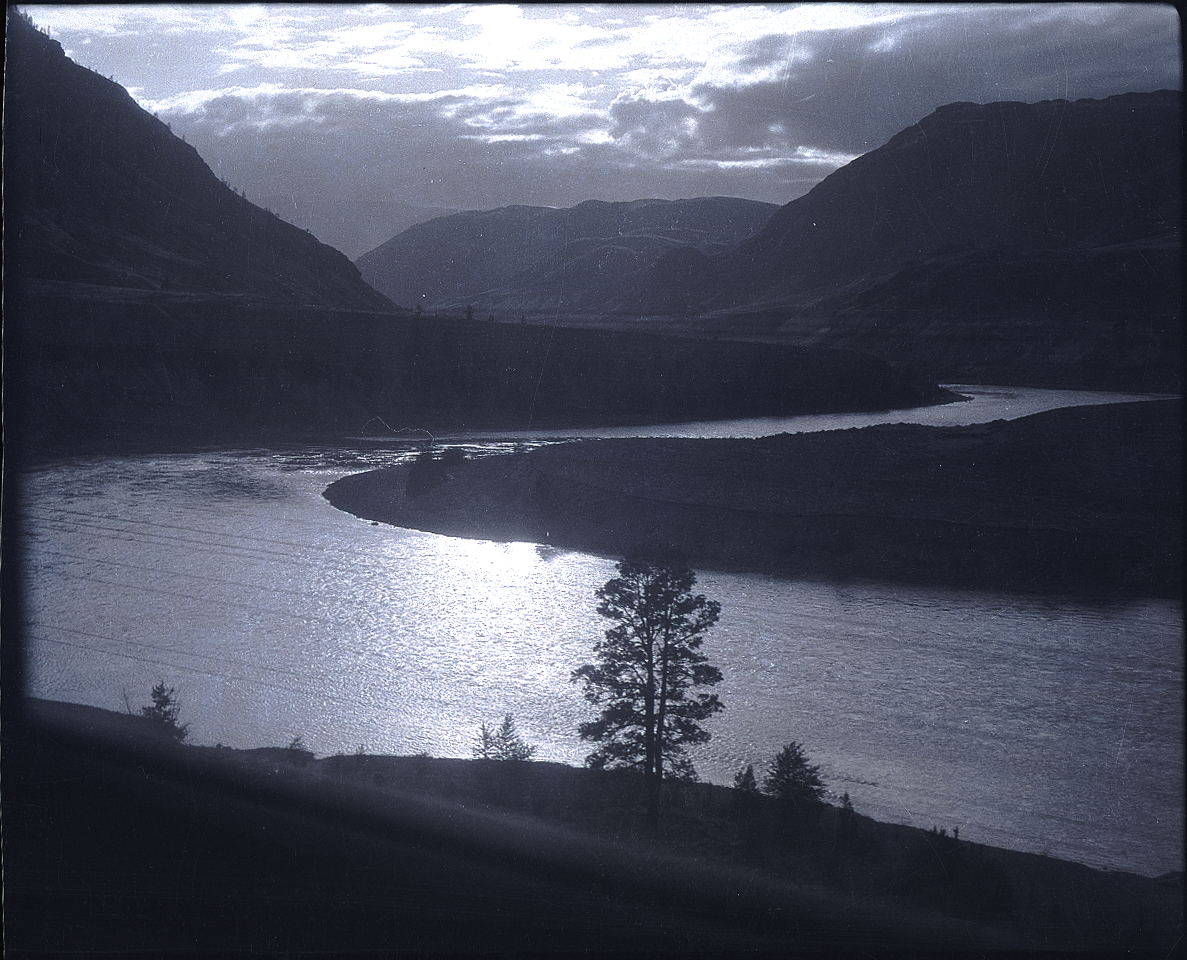
Thompson River, British Columbia, 1927

The Interior region of British Columbia was first populated after the retreat of the continental ice sheets of the last ice age. The ice moved out of the Thompson River region approximately 11,000 BCE, and migration by the ancestors of the Nlaka'pamux and Secwepemc people is thought to have occurred soon after. Some of the older archaeological sites on the lower Thompson include the Drynoch Slide site, near Spences Bridge, with artifacts dating to about 7350 BCE, and the Landels site, near Ashcroft, which dates to older than 8000 BCE. Archaeologists theorize early settlers lived in small groups, beginning with nomadic bands hunting ungulates on the plateaus around the river, who then established more permanent dwellings along the river benches as their fishing techniques developed.

The South Thompson has the watershed's oldest dated evidence of human habitation, at the Gore site near Pritchard. The human remains date to 8250 BCE, and bone analysis suggests the person was a hunter with small amounts of his protein coming from salmon. Archaeological investigation in the North Thompson has been sparse, but artifacts near Bridge Lake to the west of the river have been dated to 3000 BCE, while pieces found near the tributary Clearwater River are possibly as old as 6000 to 7000 BCE.

=== European exploration and settlement ===
Explorer of the Fraser River and North West Company employee Simon Fraser named the river, after passing its mouth on the Fraser in 1808. He named the river after his colleague, David Thompson, who had mapped much of western Canada and was at the time exploring the Columbia River basin to the east. Thompson never visited the river that bears his name. The first traverse of the Thompson from Kamloops to Lytton by settlers was by Hudson's Bay Company governor George Simpson in 1828. More Europeans entered the Thompson River valley in the early to mid 1800s, drawn by the fur trade and small gold rushes. Others started farming on the fertile benches of the river, and a North West Company trading fort at the confluence of the North and South rivers became the city of Kamloops, now the largest human population center in the watershed.

== Ecology ==
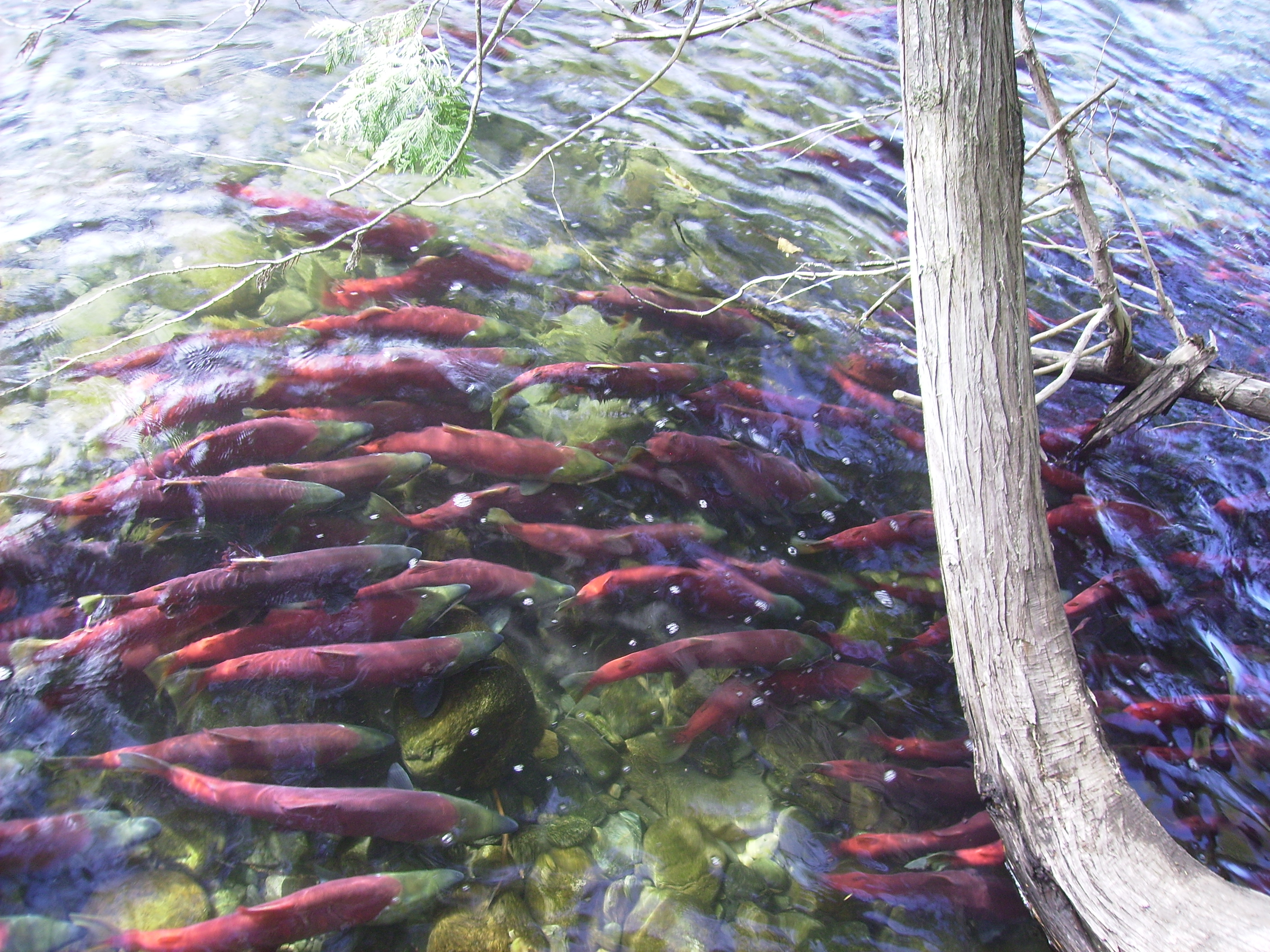
Sockeye salmon during the salmon run, Tsútswecw Provincial Park

The Thompson River supports 24 fish species, including two considered endangered. It also hosts carp, which are not native to the watershed. The river is home to large populations of Pacific salmon, including coho, sockeye, pink and chinook. Through its tributary, the Adams River, the Thompson has one of the largest sockeye salmon runs in the world. Pink salmon spawn mostly below Kamloops Lake, while coho spawning beds are found in 40 of the Thompson watershed's streams and rivers. Coastal rainbow trout (Oncorhynchus mykiss irideus), including an anadromous variety called steelhead, are found in the river along with a local strain the Kamloops rainbow trout which occurs in Kamloops Lake at the Thompson River headwaters and other nearby lakes. Other fish species include round whitefish, largescale sucker, bridgelip sucker, northern pikeminnow, longnose dace, and slimy sculpin.

Several bird species are found in Thompson River environments, including osprey, merganser, wood ducks, and American dippers. Golden eagles are found near the confluence with the Fraser, and Bald eagles congregate on the river during the salmon run. Trumpeter swans use the South Thompson on their migratory route. Rattlesnakes are found in the dry sagebrush regions of the lower river. Aquatic insects found in the river system are dominated by three groups: mayflies, midges, and caddisflies. Many of these species emerge with the spring snowmelt, which greatly increases the volume of flow on the river.

== Conservation and recreation ==
The Thompson River and its two branches are mostly unprotected through parks or reserves. Small sections of the river are within provincial parks, including Steelhead, Juniper, Goldpan, and North Thompson Provincial Parks. Some of its tributaries, such as the Clearwater, are more protected through large parks like Wells Gray. However, unlike major river systems to the north and east like the Columbia and Nechako, the Thompson has no hydroelectric dams or major man-made water diversions. Under the British Columbia Fish Protection Act of 1997, the Thompson cannot be considered for future dam construction.

Conservation of the Thompson's fisheries, especially its salmon population, has been a focus of provincial, federal, and international bodies, such as the Department of Fisheries and Oceans (DFO) and the Pacific Salmon Commission.

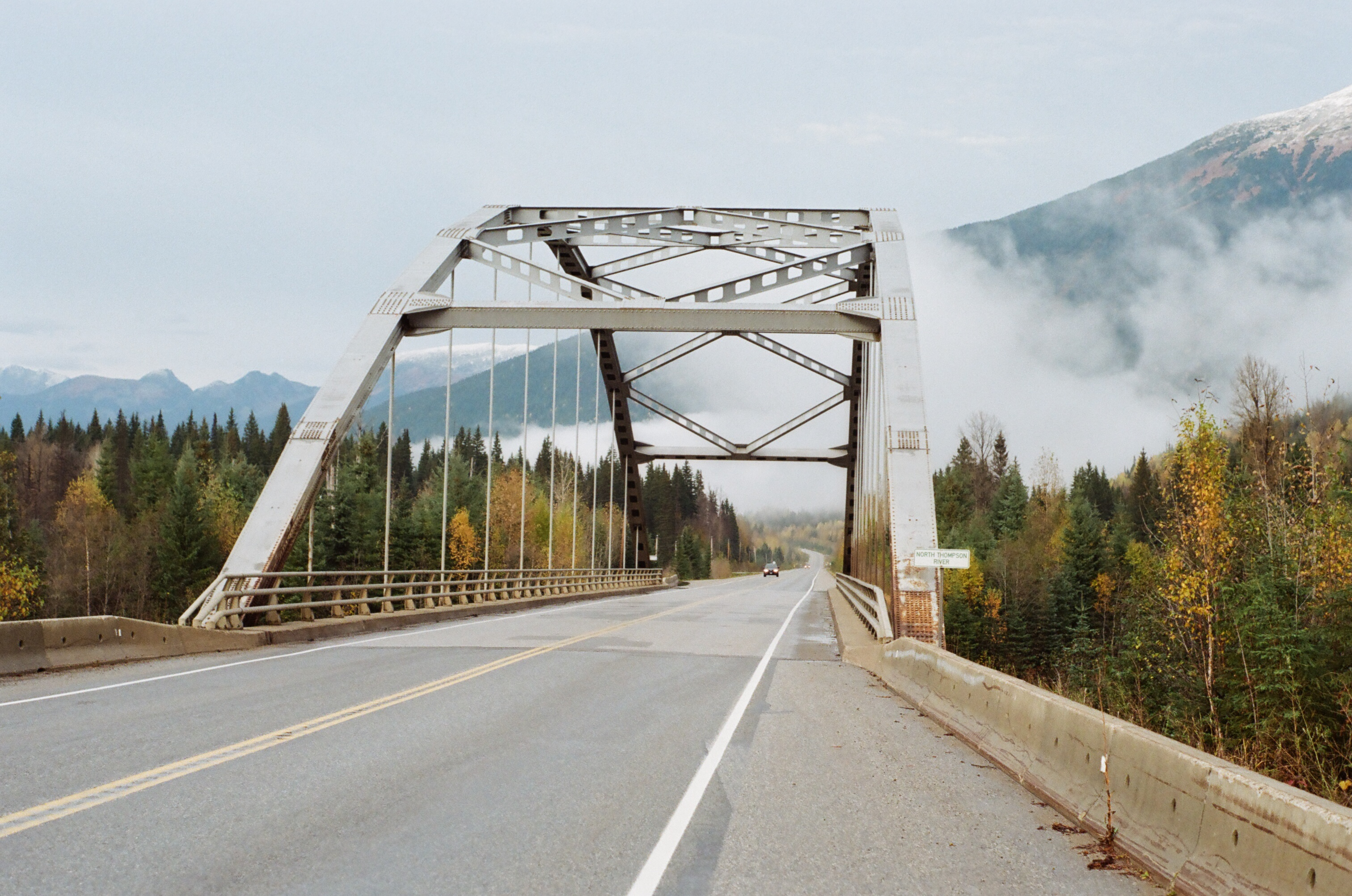
Hwy 5 bridge, first crossing of N. Thompson River after emerging from the Cariboo Mountains

=== Angling ===
From the 1950s through the early 1990s the Thompson River was considered one of the premier steelhead angling destinations in North America. The river hosted large runs of both summer and winter run anadromous coastal rainbow trout (Oncorhynchus mykiss irideus). In the late 1980s the runs were estimated at over 10,000 fish. The river attracted anglers from around the world seeking powerful Thompson River steelhead. In 1982, the average male winter run Thompson River steelhead was 16 pounds (7.3 kg). By the late 1990s, steelhead populations began to decline due to a wide variety of adverse environmental conditions and overfishing by commercial and First Nations gill netters. In 2016, annual steelhead numbers entering the Thompson were estimated to be less than 400 fish. Low numbers have prompted conservation organizations and sportsman's associations to petition Committee on the Status of Endangered Wildlife in Canada (COSEWIC), for Canada's Species At Risk Act (SARA) protections. The river is subject to catch and release angling only for steelhead and has severely restricted seasons to protect the wild stocks of remaining steelhead.

=== Whitewater rafting ===
The rapids of the lower Thompson are used for recreational whitewater rafting. The first commercial rafting operation on the river began in the 1970s, based out of Spences Bridge. Notable whitewater features on the lower river include the Frog, named for a frog-shaped rock formation, and the Jaws of Death, named by CPR engineers. Rapids on the river reach up to Class 5 on the International Scale of River Difficulty.

== Major Tributaries ==
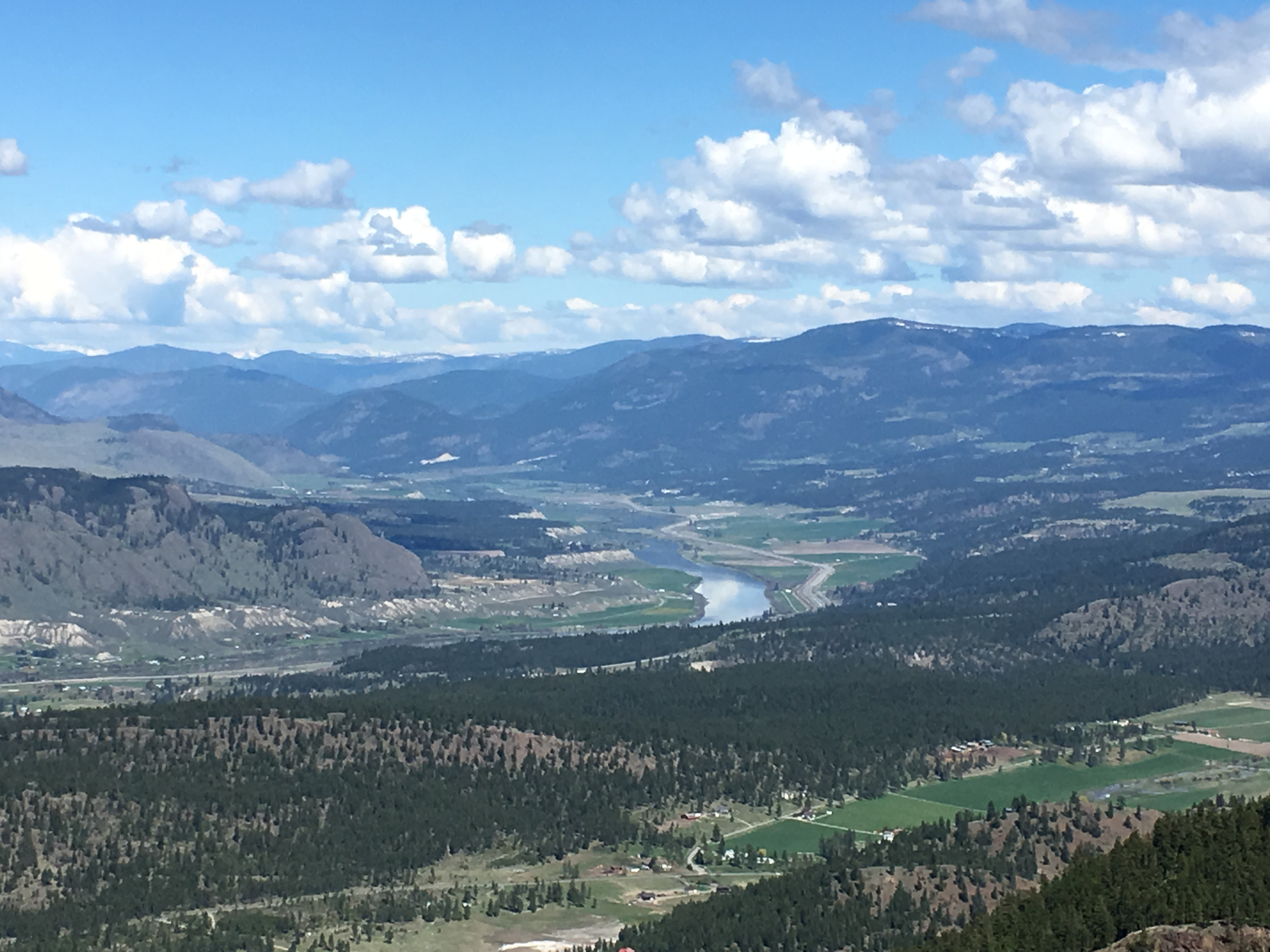
The South Thompson River valley, near Monte Creek

=== North Thompson River ===
- Albreda River
- Thunder River
- Mud Creek
- Blue River
- Mad River
- Raft River
- Clearwater River
- Barrière River

=== South Thompson River ===
- Little River (via Little Shuswap Lake from Shuswap Lake)
- Chase Creek
- Monte Creek

=== Mainstream ===
- Tranquille River (via Kamloops Lake)
- Deadman River
- Bonaparte River
- Oregon Jack Creek
- Nicola River
- Murray Creek
- Skoonka Creek
- Nicoamen River
- Botanie Creek

== See also ==
- List of tributaries of the Fraser River
- List of rivers of British Columbia
- List of crossings of the Thompson River
