= Painted Bluffs Provincial Park =

Provincial park in British Columbia

- IUCN category II (national park)
- Location within British Columbia
- Interactive map of Painted Bluffs Provincial Park
- Location: British Columbia, Canada
- Nearest city: Kamloops
- Coordinates: 50°47′48″N 120°44′41″W
- Area: 0.98 km^{2} (0.38 sq mi)
- Established: April 30, 1996
- Governing body: BC Parks

Painted Bluffs Provincial Park is a provincial park in British Columbia, Canada, located on the north side of Kamloops Lake at the outlet of Copper Creek.
