= Bighorn, British Columbia =

Bighorn
- Unincorporated settlement
- Interactive map of Bighorn
- Coordinates: 50.377°N 121.399°W
- Country: Canada
- Province: British Columbia
- Regional district: Thompson-Nicola Regional District
- Geographic region: Thompson Canyon

Bighorn is an unincorporated settlement and locality in the Thompson Canyon in British Columbia, Canada. It is a few miles south of Spences Bridge, British Columbia. The name originated as the name of a whistlestop on the Canadian Pacific Railway and is a reference to the heyday of big game hunting in the area, where Bighorn Sheep were once abundant and the region around Spences Bridge was one of the foci of the hunting industry in British Columbia.
