= Thompson Country =

Geographic region in British Columbia, Canada

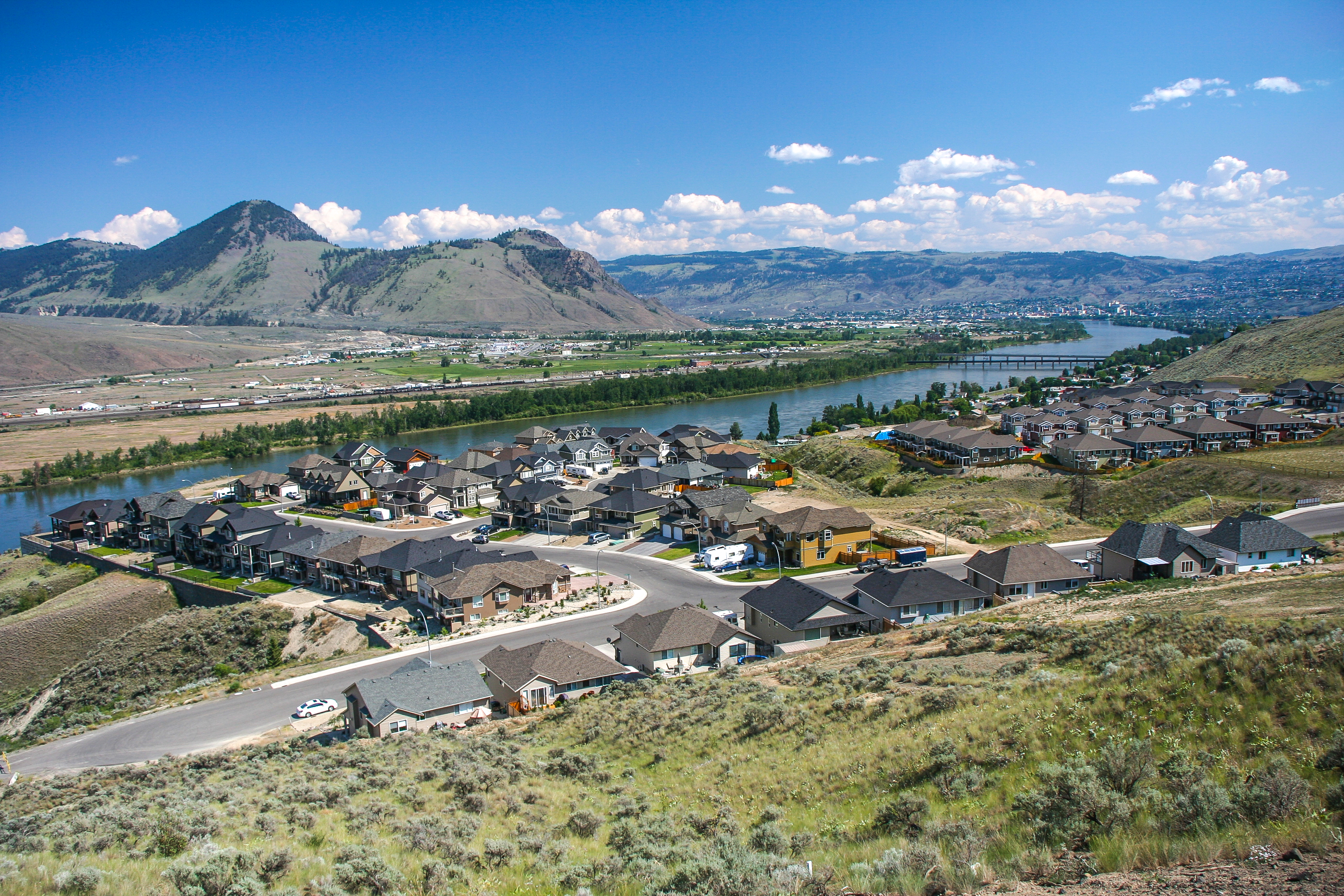
Kamloops is the focal point of Thompson Country

Thompson Country, also referred to as The Thompson and sometimes as the Thompson Valley and historically known as the Couteau Country or Couteau District, is a historic geographic region of the Southern Interior of British Columbia, more or less defined by the basin of the Thompson River. This is a tributary of the Fraser; the major city in the area is Kamloops.

== Origin and usage ==
The term originated among Scots and English in the days of the fur trade, who described Thompson Country as lying between New Caledonia to the north and the Columbia District or Oregon Country to the south. Prior to their dominance, French traders referred to this as Couteau [knife] Country or Couteau District. The Thompson nomenclature is still used today, although not as an official designation. It is often used combination forms, such as the Thompson-Okanagan or Thompson-Nicola Regional District. Weather forecasts and tourism information refer to the area as Thompson-Shuswap.

Although strictly referring to the entire Thompson basin, and potentially used in that context, more commonly it refers to the immediate vicinity of the Thompson River, with subareas such as the Bonaparte Country or Nicola Country usually referred to separately. The term "North Thompson" used to refer to the valley of the North Thompson River. The term "South Thompson" refers not only to the short valley of the South Thompson River but also to Kamloops and towns westward along the Thompson and the Trans-Canada Highway, as far as Spences Bridge. The Thompson Canyon downstream from there to Lytton at the Thompson's confluence with the Fraser is usually referred to as being part of the Fraser Canyon. That is also applied to the highway from Hope to Spences Bridge or sometimes Cache Creek.

== Climate and terrain ==
The Thompson Country is semi-arid and desert-like, except in the upper reaches of the North Thompson and in the higher areas of the plateaus to the north and south of the river (the Bonaparte Plateau and Thompson Plateau, respectively). Because of the low elevation of the valley's floor, winter temperatures are not too severe. As the region is in the immediate rainshadow of the Coast Mountains and Cascade Range, summer temperatures are among the hottest in Canada. The region is characterized by sagebrush and rangeland, with benchlands flanking the Thompson's deepening canyon from Savona downstream. Desert and, higher up, pine-covered mountains and hillsides flank the river and Kamloops Lake, which lies at the heart of the region. Lytton often vies with other interior towns for the title of "Canada's Hot Spot", with summer temperatures regularly topping 38 °C (100 °F).

Since the nineteenth century, ranching has been the historic core of the economy in the South Thompson and the adjoining Nicola and Bonaparte countries. It is also important northeast of Kamloops in the Shuswap Highland country, towards Adams Lake and the rest of the Shuswap Country. Logging and tourism are other traditionally important industries, especially in the North Thompson.

== History ==
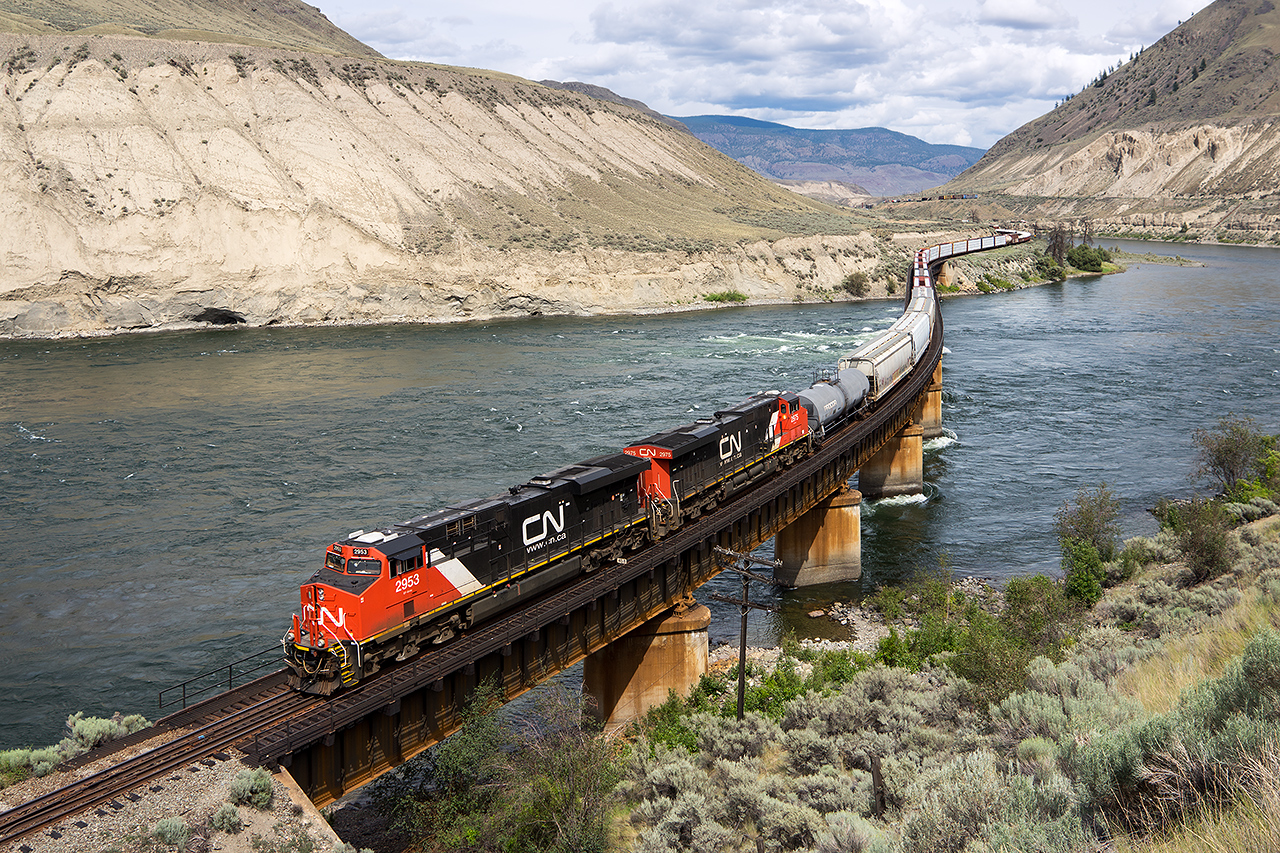
A CN train traversing the Thompson River Valley near Ashcroft

Most of the Thompson Country is the territory of the Secwepemc people, who traditionally spoke a Salishan language. From Spences Bridge downstream, the Thompson and the Nicola basins are the territory of the various Nlaka'pamux nations.

The Thompson Country, the South Thompson in particular, was one of the first areas of the Colony of British Columbia to be opened by the government to land alienation and active settlement by non-indigenous peoples. Fur traders originally used what was known as the Brigade Trail, which ran from the Okanagan via Kamloops northwestward to Green Lake, by the last leg of the Okanagan Trail from Washington Territory to the Fraser Canyon. Its western portion was the key section of the Cariboo Road connecting the Fraser Canyon to the Cariboo Plateau and its distant goldfields. This area has been important to the history of British Columbia.

Many of the earliest ranches in the Interior are still operating today. The Douglas Lake Ranch, based in the Nicola Country but spanning the Thompson and including some of the Shuswap, is one of the world's largest. Near Cache Creek, the historic Ashcroft Manor and Semlin Ranch and others were British military land-grants. The Ashcroft and Semlin ranches were owned and occupied by a Lieutenant-Governor and a Premier, respectively. The Thompson's settlement, history, and economy have been dominated by the two transcontinental rail lines flanking the river: the Canadian National Railway parallels the North Thompson, and the Canadian Pacific Railway the South Thompson.

== See also ==
- Lillooet Country
