= Tranquille Sanatorium =

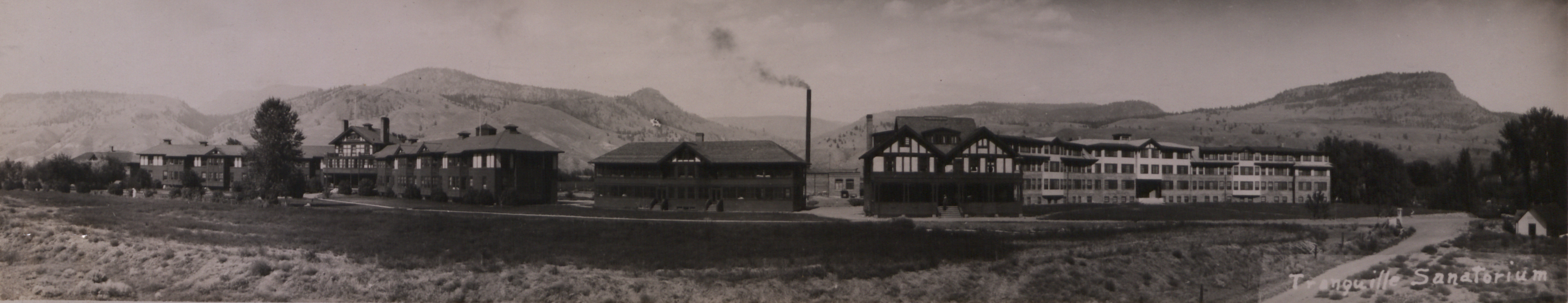

Geography
- Location: Kamloops, British Columbia, Canada

Organization
- Type: Tuberculosis hospital, Mental hospital

History
- Founded: 1907
- Closed: 1983

Links
- Lists: Hospitals in Canada

Tranquille Sanatorium was a health care facility in British Columbia, built in 1907 to treat tuberculosis, which was known as the "white plague" back then. The BC government bought the land for the sanatorium. As the tuberculosis epidemic was spreading in the 1900s, a small community known as Tranquille was built around it. Originally, the facility was called the King Edward VII Sanatorium and served only to treat tuberculosis. The community built around the facility had gardens, houses, a gymnasium, a farm, a fire department, an auditorium, a cafeteria, a laundry mat, tennis courts, a steam plant, a school for handicapped children named "Stsmemelt Village", and many more facilities.

In 1958, the hospital closed and was reopened in 1959 to treat the mentally ill. It closed permanently in 1983 but briefly functioned as a detention center for young offenders until the 1990s. In September 1991, an Italian developer, Giovanni Camporese, the president of A&A Foods, bought the land for turning it into a resort and renamed it "Padova City" as a reminder of the place he was born. There were plans for the demolition of the site but governmental interference's and Camporese's unrelated 1997 case prevented it. The Tranquille Sanatorium has a medical lab in the middle of it.

The abandoned site has recently been operated by Tranquille Farm Fresh and the acres of fertile lands are used for agriculture. Movies, such as The A-Team and Firewall were partly filmed there. The company has given tours of the grounds and opened the tunnels for Halloween with theatrics in partnership with Chimera Theatre of Kamloops, BC., The site has been approved for a future resort community named Tranquille On The Lake.
