= Kamloops Lake =

Lake in British Columbia, Canada

- Location within British Columbia
- Location: British Columbia
- Coordinates: 50°45′N 120°40′W
- Primary inflows: Thompson River, Tranquille River
- Primary outflows: Thompson River
- Catchment area: 39,050 km^{2} (15,080 sq mi)
- Basin countries: Canada
- Max. length: 29 km (18 mi)
- Max. width: 1.6 km (0.99 mi)
- Surface area: 52 km^{2} (20 sq mi)
- Average depth: 71 m (233 ft)
- Max. depth: 152 m (499 ft)
- Water volume: 3.7 km^{3} (3,000,000 acre⋅ft)
- Residence time: ca. 0.2 years (20-340 days)
- Shore length^{1}: 60.5 km (37.6 mi)
- Surface elevation: 335 m (1,099 ft)
- Settlements: Savona
- ^{1} Shore length is not a well-defined measure.

Kamloops Lake in British Columbia, Canada is situated on the Thompson River just west of Kamloops. The lake is 1.6 km wide, 29 km long, and up to 152 m deep. In prehistoric time, the lake was much longer, perhaps 20x, with adjacent silt cliffs defining ancient lake bottoms 100 meters higher than present water levels. At the outlet near Savona, a large tumbled rock, gravel moraine indicates the toe of a glacier once melted away here. The community of Savona is located at the west end of the lake, near the Thompson River outlet. The city of Kamloops is located a few miles east of the head of the lake, at the confluence of the North and South Thompson Rivers. The name, Kamloops, derives from the local Indigenous Secwepemc or Shuswap people's name for it of “Tk’emlups”, meaning ‘meeting of the waters’.

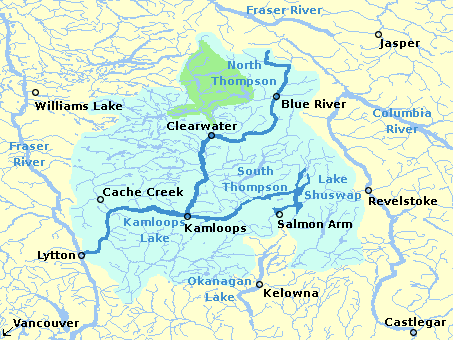
Basin of the Thompson River

The lake is bounded on all sides by steep hillsides, with level areas found only near creek deltas and around the inlet. On these hills, fresh, green grass feeds herds of Mule Deer and Rocky Mountain Sheep in the Spring. The Canadian National Railroad runs along the North shore, and the Canadian Pacific Railroad along the South shore. The surrounding land is mostly dedicated to Beef cattle ranching. It is classified as dry belt interior grasslands, Semi-arid desert, as it is in the rain shadow of the Coast Mountain Range, averaging only 10 inches of total precipitation a year. Vegetation is mostly bunchgrass and sagebrush, with pockets of Douglas fir, Ponderosa pine and spruce.

Kamloops Lake is a widening and deepening of the Thompson River, which enters at the east end and exits at the west end. The limnology of the lake is controlled by the Thompson River, which has high fluctuations in annual flow, with over 60% occurring in the early summer during freshet (May to July). Lake levels rise naturally, as much as 30 feet (9.1 m), on average, from winter lows till late June. Infrequent flood years have brought it up another 5 to 10 feet (2 – 4 m). Consequently, rare sandy beach areas expand by as much as 200 feet (61 m) in the summer as lake levels recede in July and August.

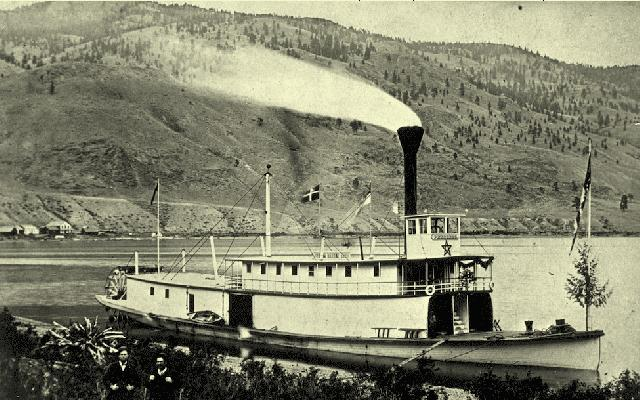
The S.S. Peerless on Kamloops Lake C. 1880s

Bulk residence times (the time it takes for the water in the lake to be replaced with new water), are very short, ranging from 20 days to 340 days, with a mean of 60 days. Because Kamloops Lake is fed by both the North and South Thompson rivers (the South Thompson drains from the very warm Shuswap Lakes, 230 meters deep), Kamloops Lake is relatively warm. It rarely freezes over in Winter. Since the late twentieth century, it has become an increasingly popular boating and recreational area. On the north side of the lake is Fredrick, and on the south side of the lake is Savona, and rural residential areas such as Cherry Creek and the Tobiano resort community. At the East end of the lake are the remains of Tranquille, a Tuberculosis Sanitorium, built in 1907 & finally closed in 1983; limited day use only access to the lakeshore exists here. A boat launch, trestle and gas dock have been built at Tobiano; it is the only location on Kamloops Lake with these facilities. Steelhead Provincial Park is a campsite in Savona, on the far western shore of the lake. Both Savona and Kamloops also have boat launches, but their use is dependent on water levels.

== Physical dimensions ==
- Water level: Unregulated
- Normal range of annual water level fluctuation: 5 m
- Surface Elevation: 335 m

== See also ==
- List of lakes of British Columbia
- Painted Bluffs Provincial Park
