= Morkill River =

Location
- Country: Canada
- Province: British Columbia
- District: Cariboo Land District

Physical characteristics
- Source: Big Shale Hill
  - location: Park Ranges, Rocky Mountains
  - coordinates: 53°35′48″N 119°46′29″W
  - elevation: 1,990 m (6,530 ft)
- Mouth: Fraser River
  - location: Loos, Robson Valley
  - coordinates: 53°36′45″N 120°42′17″W
  - elevation: 646 m (2,119 ft)
- Discharge
  - location: gage 08KA013
  - average: 37.8 m^{3}/s (1,330 cu ft/s)
  - minimum: 3.72 m^{3}/s (131 cu ft/s)
  - maximum: 420 m^{3}/s (15,000 cu ft/s)

The Morkill River is a tributary of the Fraser River in the Canadian province of British Columbia.

The river is named after Dalby Brooks Morkill, an employee of the British Columbia Land Survey. He assayed the Morkill area in 1911 and 1912.

== Course ==
The Morkill River originates at Big Shale Hill in the Park Ranges of the Rocky Mountains near Interpass Ridge on the continental divide. It flows generally west through the mountains, collecting many tributaries including Cushing Creek, Forgetmenot Creek, and Hellroaring Creek. The Morkill turns southwest as it enters the Rocky Mountain Trench. It joins the Fraser River at Loos, in the Robson Valley portion of the Rocky Mountain Trench.

== See also ==
- List of rivers of British Columbia
