= List of crossings of the Thompson River =

This is a list of bridges and other crossings of the Thompson River, in the Canadian province of British Columbia from its mouth upstream to its source(s). Also listed are crossings of the North and South Forks.

== Main River ==
Crossing	Carries	Location	Coordinates
Highway 12 Bridge	Highway 12	Lytton	50°14′10″N 121°34′52″W
Railway Bridge #1	Canadian National Railway	Lytton	50°14′12″N 121°34′50″W
Highway 1 Bridge	Highway 1	Spences Bridge	50°25′06″N 121°21′19″W
Spences Bridge (the bridge)	Bridgeway Street	Spences Bridge	50°25′13″N 121°20′34″W
Railway Bridge #2	Canadian National Railway	Near the mouth of Oregon Jack Creek	50°36′20″N 121°18′46″W
Railway Bridge #3	Canadian National Railway	South of Ashcroft	50°39′55″N 121°18′42″W
Highway 97C Bridge	Highway 97C	Ashcroft	50°43′36″N 121°16′54″W
Railway Bridge #4	Canadian National Railway	Near the mouth of the Bonaparte River	50°44′44″N 121°15′08″W
Railway Bridge #5	Canadian National Railway	Northeast of Ashcroft	50°44′37″N 121°13′15″W
Walhachin Road Bridge	Walhachin Road	East of Walhachin	50°45′52″N 121°01′55″W
Railway Bridge #6	Canadian National Railway	East of Walhachin	50°45′51″N 121°00′48″W
Railway Bridge #7	Canadian National Railway	At the mouth of the Deadman River	50°44′48″N 120°55′27″W
Kamloops Lake Bridge	Highway 1	Outlet of Kamloops Lake	50°45′22″N 120°52′19″W
Overlanders Bridge	Fortune Drive	Kamloops	50°40′52″N 120°21′01″W

== North Thompson River ==
This is a list of all crossings of the North Thompson River from its mouth in Kamloops to its source.

Crossing	Carries	Location	Coordinates
Halston Bridge	Halston Connector Road	Kamloops	50°42′43″N 120°21′14″W
Railway Bridge	Canadian National Railway	Kamloops	50°42′48″N 120°21′16″W
Highway 5 Bridge	Highway 5	Barriere	51°11′20″N 120°08′55″W
Clearwater Station Road Bridge	Clearwater Station Road	Clearwater	51°38′21″N 120°01′52″W
Birch Island/Lost Creek Road Bridge	Birch Island/Lost Creek Road	Southeast of Clearwater	51°36′08″N 119°54′50″W
Railway Bridge #2	Canadian National Railway	Southeast of Clearwater	51°35′13″N 119°51′42″W
Vavenby Bridge	Vavenby Bridge Road	Vavenby	51°34′50″N 119°43′26″W
Railway Bridge #3	Canadian National Railway	West of the mouth of the Mad River	51°40′22″N 119°38′23″W
Logging Road Bridge		East of the mouth of the Mad River	51°40′41″N 119°25′40″W
Railway Bridge #4	Canadian National Railway	East of Clearwater	51°41′26″N 119°24′34″W
Highway 5 Bridge #2	Highway 5	Avola	51°47′10″N 119°19′09″W
Highway 5 Bridge #3	Highway 5	South of Blue River	52°01′09″N 119°20′25″W
Mud Lake FSR Bridge	Mud Lake FSR	Blue River	52°07′56″N 119°17′02″W
Railway Bridge #5	Canadian National Railway	Near the mouth of the Thunder River	52°13′23″N 119°12′36″W
Bone Creek FS Road Bridge	Bone Creek FS Road	North of the mouth of the Thunder River	52°15′58″N 119°11′16″W
Highway 5 Bridge #4	Highway 5	South of the mouth of the Albreda River	52°26′27″N 119°08′43″W
Highway 5 Bridge #5	Highway 5	South of the mouth of the Albreda River	52°27′51″N 119°07′58″W
Highway 5 Bridge #6	Highway 5	Near the mouth of the Albreda River	52°28′41″N 119°07′57″W
Logging Road Bridge		Upstream from the mouth of the Albreda River	52°28′53″N 119°12′33″W

== South Thompson River ==
This is a list of all crossings of the South Thompson River from its mouth in Kamloops to its source.

Crossing	Carries	Location	Coordinates
Railway Bridge	Connector rail between the Canadian National Railway & the Canadian Pacific Railway	Kamloops	50°40′50″N 120°20′03″W
Red Bridge	Mt Paul Way	Kamloops	50°40′49″N 120°19′29″W
Yellowhead Bridge	Highway 5	Kamloops	50°40′32″N 120°18′01″W
LaFarge Cement Plant Bridge	LaFarge Road	West of Monte Creek	50°39′27″N 120°03′42″W
Pritchard Bridge	Pinantan Road	Pritchard	50°41′19″N 119°49′22″W
Little Shuswap Lake Outlet Bridge	Pine Street	Chase	50°49′38″N 119°42′00″W

== See also ==
- List of crossings of the Fraser River
- List of crossings of the Nechako River
