= Malton Range =

Mountain range in British Columbia, Canada

- Location within British Columbia

Geography
- Country: Canada
- Region: British Columbia
- Range coordinates: 52°38′N 119°04′W
- Parent range: Monashee Mountains

The Malton Range is a mountain range in southeastern British Columbia, Canada, located southwest of the Canoe Reach of Kinbasket Lake and east of the Albreda River, north of Dominion Mountain. It has an area of 451 km^{2} and is a subrange of the Monashee Mountains which in turn form part of the Columbia Mountains.

== See also ==
- Canoe Mountain
- Mount Albreda
- List of mountain ranges
