= List of crossings of the Nechako River =

This is a list of bridges of the Nechako River in the Canadian province of British Columbia. This list is in sequence from the Nechako's mouth at the Fraser River in Prince George, and then going upstream to the Nechako Reservoir.

== Prince George ==
Crossing	Carries	Location	Coordinates
Cameron Street Bridge	Cameron Street	Prince George	53.9273°N 122.7671°W
John Hart Bridge	Hwy 97	Prince George	53.9273°N 122.7803°W
Foothills Bridge	Foothills Boulevard	Prince George	53.9463°N 122.8172°W

== Vanderhoof to Nechako Reservoir ==
Crossing	Carries	Location	Coordinates
Road Bridge	Burrard Avenue	Vanderhoof	54.0261°N 124.0092°W
Highway Bridge	Hwy 27	Near Fort St. James	54.0471°N 124.1205°W
Highway Bridge	Hwy 16	Fort Fraser	54.0611°N 124.5708°W
Rail Bridge	CN Rail	Fort Fraser	54.0560°N 124.5700°W
Dam	Kenney Dam Road	Kenney Dam	53.5792°N 124.9502°W

== See also ==
- List of crossings of the Thompson River
- List of crossings of the Fraser River
