= Albreda Lake =

Lake in Thompson-Nicola Regional District, British Columbia, Canada

- Location in British Columbia Albreda Lake (Canada)
- Location: Thompson-Nicola Regional District, British Columbia
- Coordinates: 52°37′49″N 119°09′28″W
- Part of: Pacific Ocean drainage basin
- Primary inflows: Albreda River
- Primary outflows: Albreda River
- Basin countries: Canada
- Max. length: 240 m (790 ft)
- Max. width: 100 m (330 ft)
- Surface elevation: 869 m (2,851 ft)

Albreda Lake is a lake in Thompson-Nicola Regional District in the Interior region of British Columbia, Canada. It is in the Pacific Ocean drainage basin.

The primary inflow, at the northeast, and outflow, at the southeast, is the Albreda River, which flows via the North Thompson River, the Thompson River and the Fraser River to the Pacific Ocean.

The locality of Albreda is 900 metres (3,000 ft) to the north, and both British Columbia Highway 5 and the Canadian National Railway transcontinental main line (used by freight traffic and the Via Rail Canadian train) pass by to the east of the eastern shore of the lake.

== See also ==
- List of lakes of British Columbia
