= Walhachin =

- Community
- Location of Walhachin in British Columbia
- Coordinates: 50°44′59″N 120°59′04″W
- Country: Canada
- Province: British Columbia
- Region: Thompson Country
- Regional district: Thompson-Nicola
- Time zone: UTC−07:00 (PT)
- Postal code: V0K 2P0
- Area codes: 250, 778, 236, & 672
- Highways: Highway 1
- Waterways: Thompson River

Walhachin is an unincorporated community in the Thompson Country region of south central British Columbia, Canada. The place is on a south shore bench of the Thompson River between Brassey and Jimmie creeks. The locality, off BC Highway 1, is by road about 77 kilometres (48 mi) northeast of Spences Bridge, 28 kilometres (17 mi) east of Cache Creek, and 66 kilometres (41 mi) west of Kamloops.

== Topography ==
At the end of the Last Glacial Period (LGP), a lake covered the valley. At the mouths of Deadman and Brassey creeks, large sand and gravel deltas formed. The Bonaparte River, which then drained eastward, deposited silt on the valley floor. The lowering lake reduced the deltas, revealed the terraces, and allowed the Thompson to carve a channel to flow westward. Later erosion in the drainage basins of the Brassey and Upper Ranch creeks overlaid these sand and gravel areas with fertile deposits.

The 2,000-hectare (5,000-acre) area is about 2.4 kilometres (1.5 mi) wide stretching 11 kilometres (7 mi) along the river. The plateaus set the north–south limits. A First Nations reserve to the east and then unavailable land to the west set the longitudinal limits.

== Earlier settlements ==
In 1858, the arrival of placer miners transformed the river edges and prompted the displacement of First Nations in the vicinity. Evidence of former indigenous winter quarters is visible along the terraces. In 1868, the Skeetchestn Band reserve on Deadman Creek was surveyed.

Experiencing the vegetation associated with semi-arid conditions of Western North America, the land was most suited to cattle ranching. In 1865, John Wilson pre-empted property to the west on the north shore for winter grazing. He expanded his herd to thousands of cattle, unlike the pre-emptors, who had preceded him. On the south shore central parts, J.B. Greaves abandoned his herd in 1867, returned in the spring, and settled. Adjacent to his east, he also gained title to the Tingley property in 1872. He greatly expanded his holdings eastward in 1879.

On the south shore opposite Wilson, Charles Pennie pre-empted in 1870, acquiring and leasing more property over the following years. By 1876, he remained the only permanent settler west of Greaves. Overgrazing transformed the natural bunchgrass to sagebrush and cactus. Possessing water rights on Brassey Creek and storage at Twin Lakes, Pennie developed a 0.8-hectare (2-acre) apple orchard, having potential far exceeding the general area. After Charles died in 1900, his widow was open to selling the ranch. By this time, 16 hectares (40 acres) of hay was also under irrigation.

== Railways ==
=== Canadian Pacific ===
In December 1884, the eastward advance of the Canadian Pacific Railway (CP) rail head from Port Moody passed through the locality.

Erected in 1884, the standard-design (Bohi's Type 5) single-storey station building with gable roof and dormers (identical to Keefers) was sold in 1965.

In 1901, a locomotive under tow and four freight cars toppled over an embankment. In 1908, a westbound freight train struck and killed a man near Semlin, which is named for Charles Augustus Semlin. That year, CP installed a wye. The station was at the highest point on the line west of Craigellachie. Consequently, 60-car freight trains were split into 30-car units for separate hauling up the steep grade from North Bend. In 1909, the body of a man who likely fell from a freight train was discovered to the west.

In 1910, a freighthopper died in an unspecified accident. In 1911, all the passenger cars of a train derailed on returning to the main line at Semlin, and CP built an engine house and plastered the station. On being evicted from a freight train that year, several freighthoppers hurled rocks at the train drawing a response in kind from the crew. The offenders were later arrested. In 1914, a freighthopper suffered a crushed arm and foot on being run over either when boarding or departing a CP train. Months later, an escaping jewels thief attempted to board a passing CP train but instead sustained scalp wounds and fell dazed beside the track.

In 1920, a CP train struck a man riding a horse along the track, causing severe injuries. In 1921, one defendant received three years and the other two and a half years for breaking into a CP baggage car near Walhachin. In 1927, the charge from a lightning bolt travelling along the wire to the headphones of the CP telegraph operator briefly knocked him unconscious.

In 1932, an eastbound train carrying a CP superintendent ran into a rockslide. That year, transients completely burned five boxcars at Semlin. In 1936, a fire burned the CP water tower, three telegraph poles, and some ties. The tank infrastructure was rebuilt.

In 1948, automatic block signalling (ABS) was installed.

In 1955, the partial derailment of an eastbound CP passenger train caused no injuries.

In 1976, 28 westbound CP wheat cars derailed at Semlin, with four falling about 61 metres (200 ft) into the Thompson.

In 1985, protests lodged after CP removed a private crossing over four tracks was resolved by a relocated crossing over a single track.

In 1998, the derailment of five rail cars of a CP freight train about 1 kilometre (0.6 mi) east damaged approximately 500 metres (1,640 ft) of track.

In 2010, a cultivator struck by a train at a crossing was destroyed.

The CP Walhachin passing track is 2.9 kilometres (9,460 ft).

CP Train Timetables (Regular stop or Flag stop)
	Mile	1887	1891	1898	1905	1909	1912	1916	1919	1929	1932	1935	1939	1943	1948	1954	1960	1964	1965
Basque	55.9			Regular				Flag	Flag	Flag	Flag	Flag	Flag	Flag	Flag	Flag			
Ashcroft	47.3	Regular	Regular	Regular	Regular	Regular	Regular	Regular	Regular	Regular	Regular	Regular	Regular	Regular	Regular	Both	Regular	Regular	Both
Semlin	37.3								Flag	Flag	Flag	Flag	Flag	Flag	Flag	Flag			
Pennys	32.0	Regular	Regular	Flag	Flag	Flag													
Walhachin	32.0						Both	Both	Both	Both	Regular	Regular	Regular	Regular	Regular	Regular	Both	Both	
Savona	25.2	Regular	Regular	Regular	Regular	Regular	Both	Both	Both	Both	Both	Both	Both	Both	Both	Both	Regular	Regular	Flag
Munro	19.7					Flag	Flag	Flag	Flag	Flag									
Cherry Creek	14.6	Regular	Flag	Regular	Flag	Flag	Flag	Flag	Flag	Flag	Flag	Flag	Flag	Flag	Flag	Flag			

=== Canadian National ===
In 1912 and 1913, a construction worker fell from the Canadian Northern Railway (CNoR) bridge and drowned.

In December 1914, the westward advance of the CNoR rail head from Kamloops reached Walhachin. The track follows the valley floor at a much lower elevation than the hamlet proper.

In 1915, a worker fell to his death from the CNoR bridge.

The Canadian National Railway (CN) passing track at Walhachin on the predominantly single-track subdivision was 1.1 kilometres (3,448 ft) in 1916, progressively extending to the current 2.0 kilometres (6,455 ft).

In 1922, no injuries occurred when a passenger train hit a landslide, derailing the locomotive.

In 1947, five died and a crew member was scalded, when a CN freight train derailed at Anglesey.

In 1952, a freighthopper died as a result of falling from a CN freight train.

In 1973, the CN train station (1914) burned to the ground.

CN and Official Guide Train Timetables (Regular stop or Flag stop)
	Mile	1916	1923	1927	1933	1936	1938	1943	1947	1950	1956	1960
Ashcroft	2715.8	Regular	Regular	Regular	Regular	Both	Flag	Both	Both	Both	Both	Flag
McAbee	2707.9	Regular	Regular	Regular		Flag		Flag		Flag	Flag	
Anglesey	2703.0	Regular	Regular	Regular		Flag		Flag		Flag	Flag	
Walhachin	2699.5	Regular	Regular	Regular		Flag		Flag		Flag	Flag	
Savona	2692.6		Regular	Regular		Flag		Flag		Flag	Flag	
Copper Creek	2687.7	Regular	Regular	Regular		Flag		Flag		Flag	Flag	
Frederick	2680.7		Regular	Regular		Flag		Flag		Flag	Flag	

^a. The twice weekly Kamloops–Boston Bar way-freight, introduced in 1932, is omitted from the Official Guide timetables.

== Creating the orchard subdivision ==
Few small BC communities have had as much written about them as Walhachin.

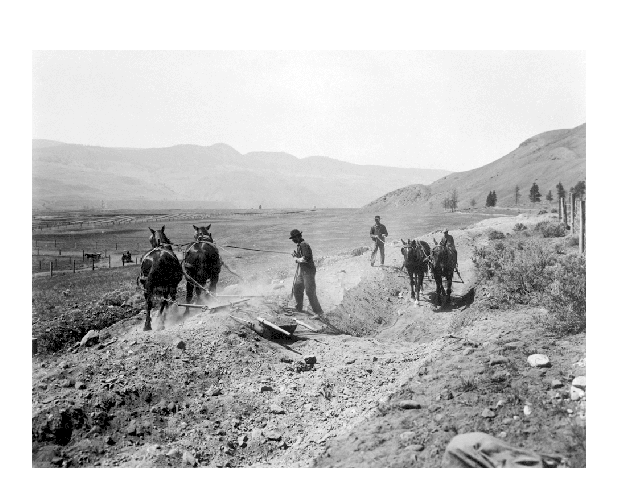
Irrigation ditch excavation, Walhachin, 1910

On the advice of C.E. Barnes, the British Columbia Development Association (BCDA) in 1908 purchased the Pennie Ranch (including the Upper Ranch) and an additional 380 hectares (930 acres) formerly owned by J.B. Greaves. The $229,400 total price included buildings and livestock, the latter being on sold to free the land for orchard development.

The BCDA immediately formed two subsidiaries, the Dry Belt Settlement Utilities (DBSU) for the townsite and the BC Horticultural Estates for the agriculture. In summer 1908, 150 town lots were surveyed, 10 hectares (25 acres) planted with grass, and work began on developing irrigation systems from the creeks.

In 1909, construction commenced on a hotel, general store, bunkhouse, and three residences. By that fall, the London promotional campaign was underway. The elaborate brochures were directed toward the upper class, and most purchases were made sight unseen. An additional incentive was that immigrants could bring in their opulent possessions duty free.

The townsite was at the Upper Ranch. Reginald Pole was the inaugural postmaster 1909–1910.

== Name origin ==
Although CP spelled the station name as Pennys from the 1880s, the Pennie Ranch settlement was generally called Pennies or sometimes Penniestown or Penniston.

The BCDA renamed its townsite of Sunnymede as Walhassen in February 1909, claiming this anglicization of a First Nations word meant "abundance of the earth". The spelling soon changed to Walhachin. An accurate translation as "land of round rocks", which better described the terraces capped with large concentrations of cobble gravel, never appeared in promotional materials.

Unlike other interior communities, Walhachin functioned as an elite English implant during its boom years, earning the unofficial name of Little England or Canada's Camelot, a second Eden in the desert.

== Expansion and climax prior to World War I ==
Years of optimism in BC, accompanied by inaccurate and/or biased promotional material, triggered immigration, which was key to Walhachin's growth. Such literature claimed that fruit farming in the valley was highly profitable and an ideal pursuit for the upper class, while glossing over the isolation and harsh environment.

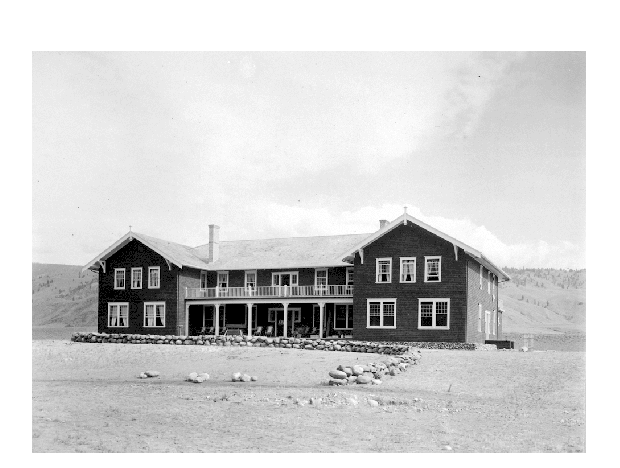
Walhachin Hotel, 1910

The British population totalled 6 in 1909, 79 in 1910, and 150 in 1914. In 1910, the general store opened, the townsite main square was laid out, 13 residences built, and the irrigation aqueduct was completed. The settlers lived at the townsite rather than at their orchard lots and fields, which were some distance away on both sides of river. That April, Prime Minister Wilfrid Laurier officially opened the hotel. The BCDA purchased an additional 1,321 hectares (3,265 acres) on the north shore from the Dominion Government for a dollar an acre. The Snohoosh Water Light and Power Co. was established mainly to supply water for this land.

In 1911, 12 residences were built and the Walhachin Chronicle published three editions. In 1912, The Walhachin Times printed a single edition. That year, a large town hall was erected. Two restaurants, a bakery, barber, butcher, dairy, livery stable, ladies store, two insurance offices, and three laundries, also existed. In May 1913, the government school opened. An unofficial school had operated since March 1911.

== Decline and abandonment ==
Promoters buying cheap land, making minimal improvements, and selling to new settlers, often did not end well for the latter. Additionally in this instance, the unpaid debenture holders forced the BCDA into bankruptcy in 1912. These lenders eventually received nine pence on the pound sterling (less than four cents on the dollar), making Walhachin also an investment failure for both stockholders and lenders.

When the Marquess of Anglesey began buying Walhachin land in 1913, the evidence suggested another bad investment. That year, he laid out the Anglesey townsite on the north shore. He introduced a degree of relaxation to the rigid class structure at Walhachin by changing the rules to permit public entry to the hotel. However, use of the swimming pool at his Anglesey residence remained restricted to the aristocracy.

One account claims about 1,800 tonnes (2,000 short tons) of potatoes were produced in 1911, whereas another states that only small volumes of vegetables were shipped out prior to 1917. That year, 15 acres of trees produced the first commercial apples. During World War I the infrastructure experienced neglect. In 1918, the Marquess gained a controlling interest in the venture.

In spring 1919, the men began returning from the war. As a remembrance, the community hall was renamed the Soldiers Memorial Hall. The provincial government and the attitude toward the English settlers had changed. Finding better prospects elsewhere, these owners advertised their properties for sale. Premier John Oliver refused the Marquess' offer of his holdings for soldier resettlement. That year, all fruit shipments ceased, because the orchards and infrastructure had badly deteriorated.

In 1920, the hotel was demolished. By 1921, with no improvements and falling fruit prices, most settlers left and the Marquess lost interest.

The DBSU entered bankruptcy in July 1922, the water system was abandoned, and by yearend, all the English gentry were gone. The CN railway point being the notable local survivor of the Anglesey family name, the Marquess returned permanently to England but revisited his ranch at least once.

After 1923, Chinese gardeners leased 5 hectares (12 acres) as orchard and also grew vegetables on the limited arable ground irrigated by the Twin Lakes Reservoir.

== Reasons for failure ==
=== Irrigation obstacles ===
The irrigation system was the dominant factor for failure. On the south shore, the creeks supplied water via 2 kilometres (1.2 mi) of wooden flume, 1.6 kilometres (1 mi) of ditch, 1.2 kilometres (0.7 mi) of wooden pipe, and 0.8 kilometres (0.5 mi) of steel pipe. On the north shore, a similar combination stretched over 34 kilometres (21 mi). An underwater pipe crossing the river to supplement the south shore irrigation was washed out two months after installation during the 1911 spring run off. The replacement was hung from a suspension bridge. When the pipe diameter was increased in 1914, not only did the weight cause sag and leakage, but also prohibited use during high water. The total length of irrigation works was 102 kilometres (63 mi), which included the connecting lines to the orchards.

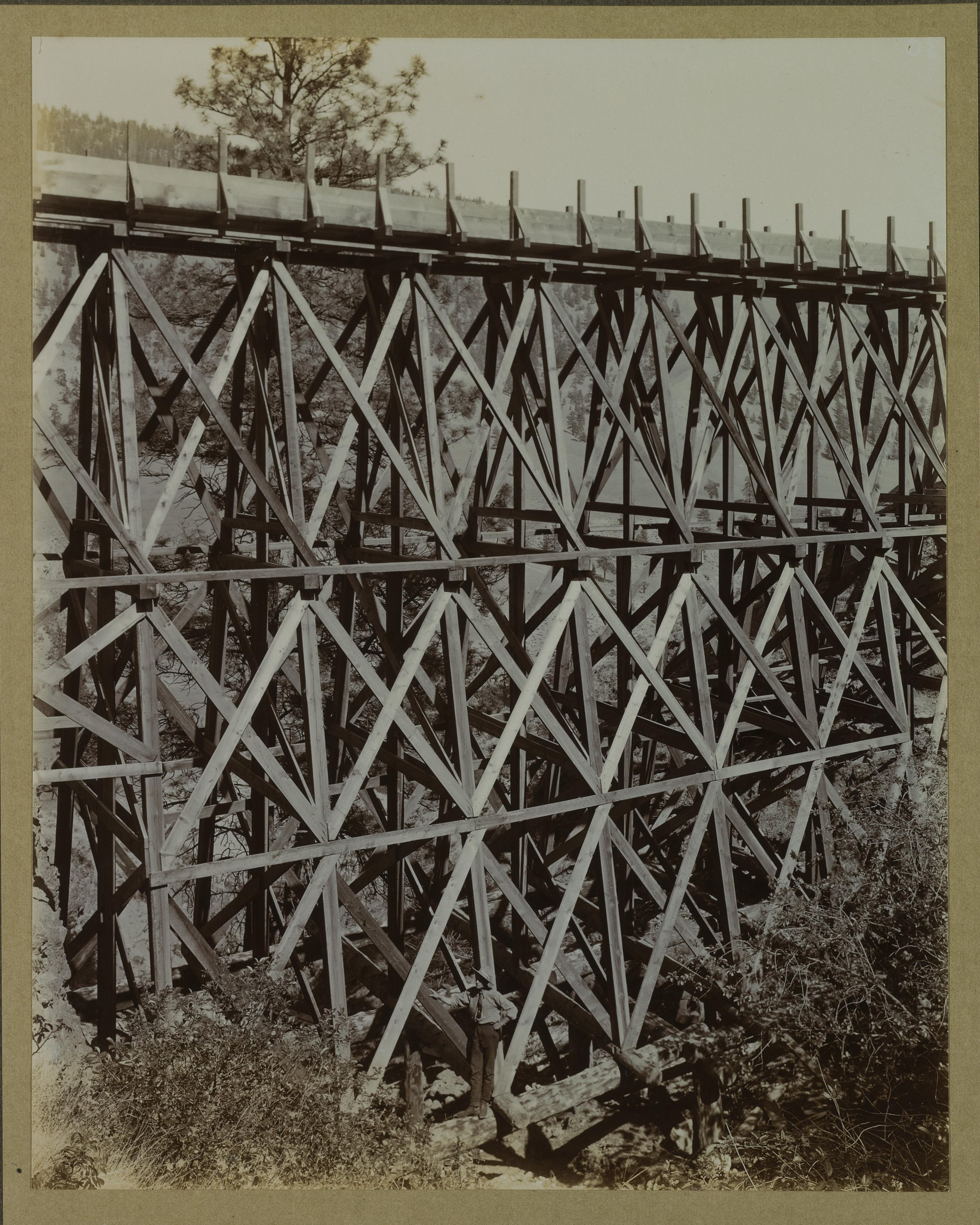
Flume trestle, Walhachin, c.1910

Opinions differ as to the quality of workmanship in building the sections of the main flume. One view regards the work as more than adequate. A contrary perspective of the whole conduit infrastructure suggests a temporariness in design to save costs, with the intention of replacement once the orchards produced income streams. From the beginning, the system proved unreliable. A 1918 summer rainstorm damaged ditches and flumes. Not repaired until the next year, a season of fruit and vegetables was lost. In general, ditches lost water to seepage and eroded. Flume supports sank as ground settled or were undermined by leakage in those places. Beavers blocked the 42 kilometres (26 mi) of creeks and the torrent from dismantling their dams damaged aqueducts.

To recover the original capital cost of the water system (estimated at $100,000 to $300,000) and ongoing maintenance made the water supply uneconomical. A 1944 study to examine the feasibility of growing alfalfa determined that water costs would make such a project unprofitable. A 1945 study to examine the feasibility of settling returned World War II soldiers reached a similar conclusion. Only a small acreage supplied by the Twin Lakes Reservoir was viable.

In the 1910s, the pumping of water up a 340-metre (1,100 ft) elevation from the river below was financially impractical. After three decades of neglect, isolated apple trees in various spots did survive. Technology advances in the 1950s offered inexpensive water for crops, where soil conditions were favourable.

=== Climate ===
The valley is one of driest parts of Canada, experiencing only light rainfall and snowfall. The frost-free period in the valley bottom is two to three times longer than at the higher elevations. The northern side is less prone to frosts but more to drought. The varying landforms create micro-climatic differences around Walhachin.

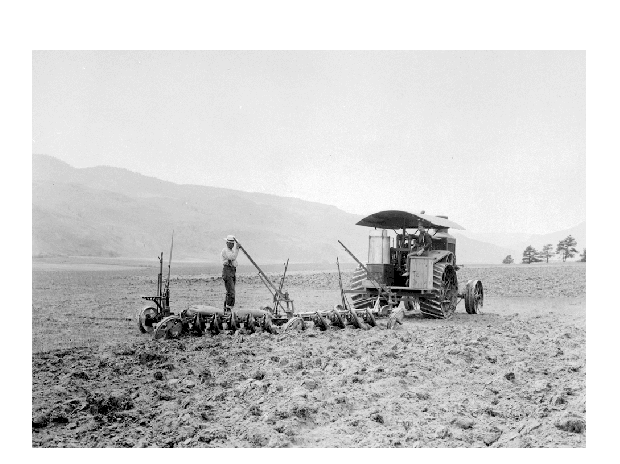
Plowing for the orchards. Walhachin, 1910

The first government experimental farm was opened in the Thompson Valley in 1934. In the absence of prior research, adapting to suit the environment required trial and error by earlier settlers. Whereas the long warm season was promoted to potential settlers, the three and half months of cold season was the real challenge. Although frosts may cost only one season for vegetable crops, the cost for fruit trees, which take five years before an appreciable harvest, was far more serious. The excessive summer temperatures caused high evaporation of scarce water resources and the sun scald of fruit. In 1917, such losses were accompanied by an outbreak of codling moth disease.

Unlike the Okanagan, where the lake moderates temperatures, Walhachin is susceptible to serious frosts, which in 1912 destroyed 20 hectares (50 acres) of peaches, indicating that the vicinity was suitable for apple crops only. Also tried but rejected were tobacco, cherries, pears, plums, and apricots.

=== Soil quality ===
Conducted in 1953, the first soil study on the various terrace levels determined 90 hectares (222 acres) too rocky for any agriculture, 29 hectares (72 acres) low yielding and expensive to irrigate, and 64 hectares (159 acres) suitable for vegetables.

A 1962 comprehensive soil study concluded the general area was only suitable for grazing livestock. Of the greater land mass, only 4 per cent (about 81 hectares (200 acres)) was suitable for vegetables and 90 per cent could grow alfalfa (subject to economical irrigation). Such an environment could not have provided a viable base for the 1910s settlement.

=== Calibre of settlers ===
The retirees from the military or public service had no knowledge of farming. Most of the young men would not have chosen to come to Walhachin. Many either possibly faced or actually experienced expulsion from school, the military, or high society, because of moral shortcomings, legal problems, or gross incompetence. Their families effectively banished them from England by sending them to manage a newly acquired overseas property. These rejects lacked a motivation to succeed, a desire to work, and useful employment skills. The elderly came to enjoy the drier climate in their retirement years.

Most settlers lived for leisure rather than to comprehend horticulture. Agricultural advice from anyone was seldom invited. The place operated like an exclusive club, ensuring minimal contact with the lower classes. Many of the affluent departed over the winter for warmer places. Unfortunately, the financial return from orchards was never going to produce the upper-class standard of living most expected. No doubt, the lower class immigrants were largely hard workers as were some of the gentry.

=== World War I ===
A questionable claim is that Walhachin had the largest per capita enlistment of men in World War I of any community in Canada. In August 1914, the Walhachin Squadron of the 31st British Columbia Horse, which comprised all the young men except one, left for training. Beyond patriotism, World War I provided the disenchanted an opportunity to escape from the isolation, where suitable marriage prospects were slender and the overall Walhachin enterprise was indicating failure. Though 40 men left immediately to serve, a considerable number of older and married men remained at least until 1916 and continued to manage the orchards, until many of the married enlisted. When the war depleted the general labour supply, Chinese and First Nations became the primary workers. The war also dried up essential funding from England, which reduced payrolls and caused the neglect of infrastructure. The increased wartime demand did provide a lucrative market for fruit crops generally.

=== Produce pricing ===
Being on both the CP and CN main lines was advantageous for distribution. During 1919 and 1920, apple prices remained high, but the dramatic increase of apple crops in BC alone led to falling prices in international markets from 1921 onward. Within this gradual decline were extreme annual fluctuations. Also, US orchardists could produce comparable fruit at significantly lower cost. Even if the Walhachin orchards had survived, they could not have been profitable in the long term.

== Ferries and bridge across the Thompson ==
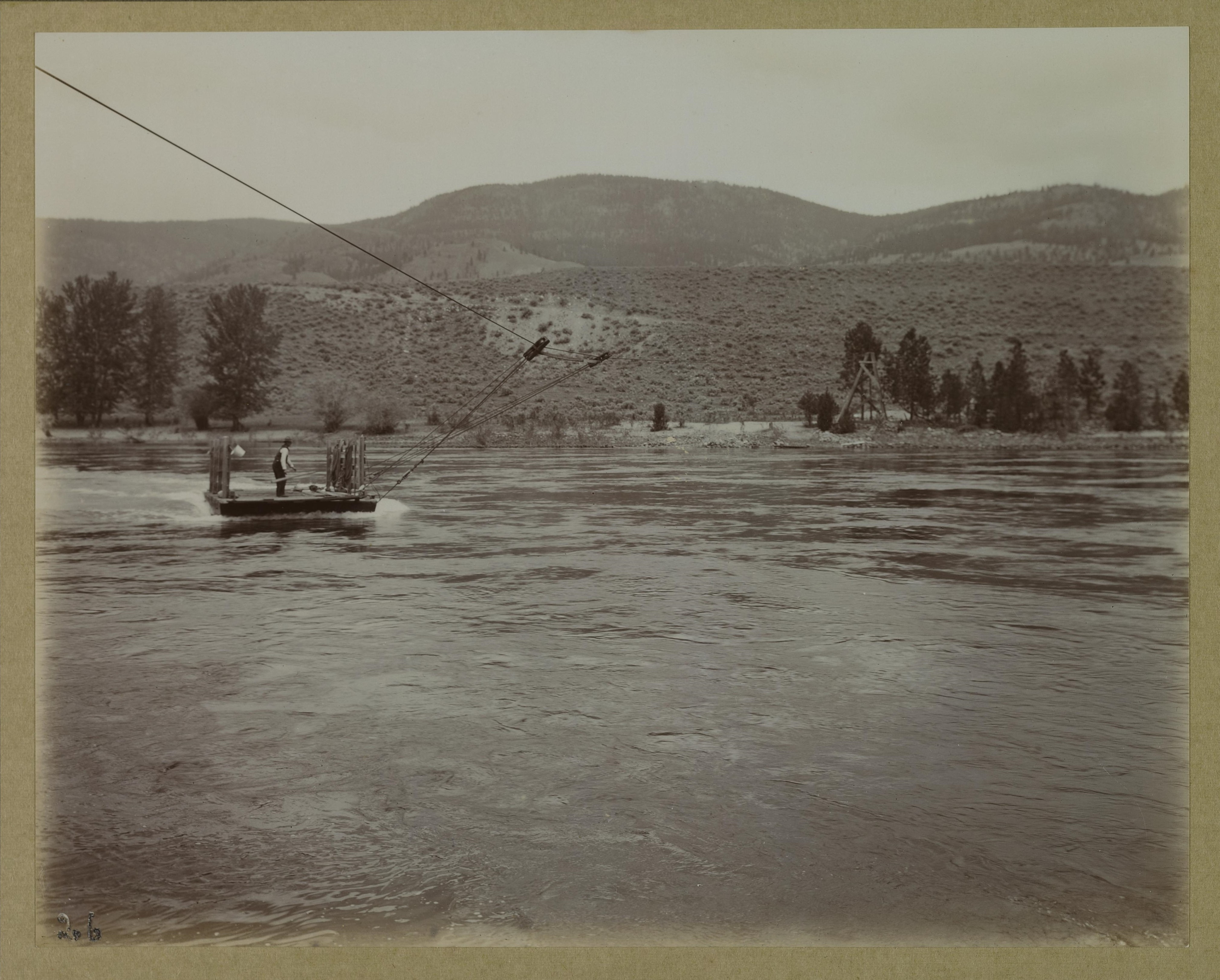
Ferry, Walhachin, c.1910

A ferry installed at the townsite in 1908 ran until 1910. That year, a ferry installed at the former Pennie Ranch site to serve the Barnes estate on the north side ran until 1912. Close to the latter in 1911, the Algoma Steel Bridge Co erected two 61-metre (200 ft) through Howe truss sections, which were 4.5 metres (14 ft 8 in) wide, and supported by abutments and a central pier. The bridge opened the following year.

The wooden deck of the single-lane steel bridge was replaced in 1977–78 and 2015.

== Intermediate community ==
Although a ghost of past glory, Walhachin was never a true ghost town. While the British left, the place never died, because many of the workers remained and the railways maintained a presence.

In the late 1920s, student numbers were sufficient to warrant two teachers at the school, but the population fell during the Great Depression. At that time, the government established a relief camp on the north shore several miles away.

The estate was largely vacant until 1940, when cattleman Harry Ferguson leased 2,000 hectares (5,000 acres) of bottom land, which he used for winter grazing. The orchards and sagebrush were cleared and grass planted. Prior to his death in 1947, the Marquess sold the property to Ferguson for a mere $40,000, which has continued in use for cattle ranching.

In 1954, BC Hydro transmission lines introduced electricity to the area. That year, the elementary school closed, since a school bus taking high school students to Ashcroft could also carry elementary students.

In the 1960s, the hall renovations included halving the stage width and converting the actors' dressing rooms into washrooms. Remaining in the hall for almost 50 years, the Weber piano, once played by Ignacy Jan Paderewski, was donated in 1961 to the University of British Columbia School of Music.

The Walhachin Quarry is south of the hamlet and the CP main line. In 1973, blasting for road gravel blew out windows in the community hall and shattered glass at residences. After a period of inactivity, operations resumed in 1984. The quarry primarily produces railway ballast.

The general store operated at least until the mid-1980s, when the Thompson River Estates subdivision was created to the northeast on the opposite shore.

== Later community ==
When the Walhachin postmaster retired in October 2004, the post office closed permanently.

In 2008, centennial celebrations were held over a weekend.

In 2011, the museum opened in the hall.

The annual Walhaschindig has been held since 2016.

In 2018, Walhachin unveiled a new cenotaph behind the hall, which commemorates the more than 100 men who took part in World War I.

The water supply system, which serves about 35 customers, was largely constructed in 1979 and upgraded in 2002 and 2012.

The population totals about 40 permanent residents. Including the hall, 14 original buildings still stand, the former store and schoolhouse converted to private residences.

To west is Juniper Beach Provincial Park and east is Walhachin Oxbows Provincial Park.

== Notable people ==
- Ralph Chetwynd (1890–1957), businessman and politician, resident.
- Arthur Chetwynd (1913–2004), documentary producer, place of birth.
- Gordon Flowerdew (1885–1918), Victoria Cross recipient, resident.
- Maurice Henry Nelson Hood (1881-1915), naval officer, resident.
- Rowland Hood, 3rd Viscount Bridport (1911–1969), naval officer and politician, place of birth.

== Filming location ==
Scenes from the following were shot in the Walhachin area:

- Firewall (2006).
- Joy Ride 2: Dead Ahead (2008).

== Maps ==
- Map of district.
- Map of pre-emptions.
- Map of townsite.
- Map of agriculture.

== See also ==
- List of crossings of the Thompson River
