= Mount Albreda =

Mountain in British Columbia, Canada

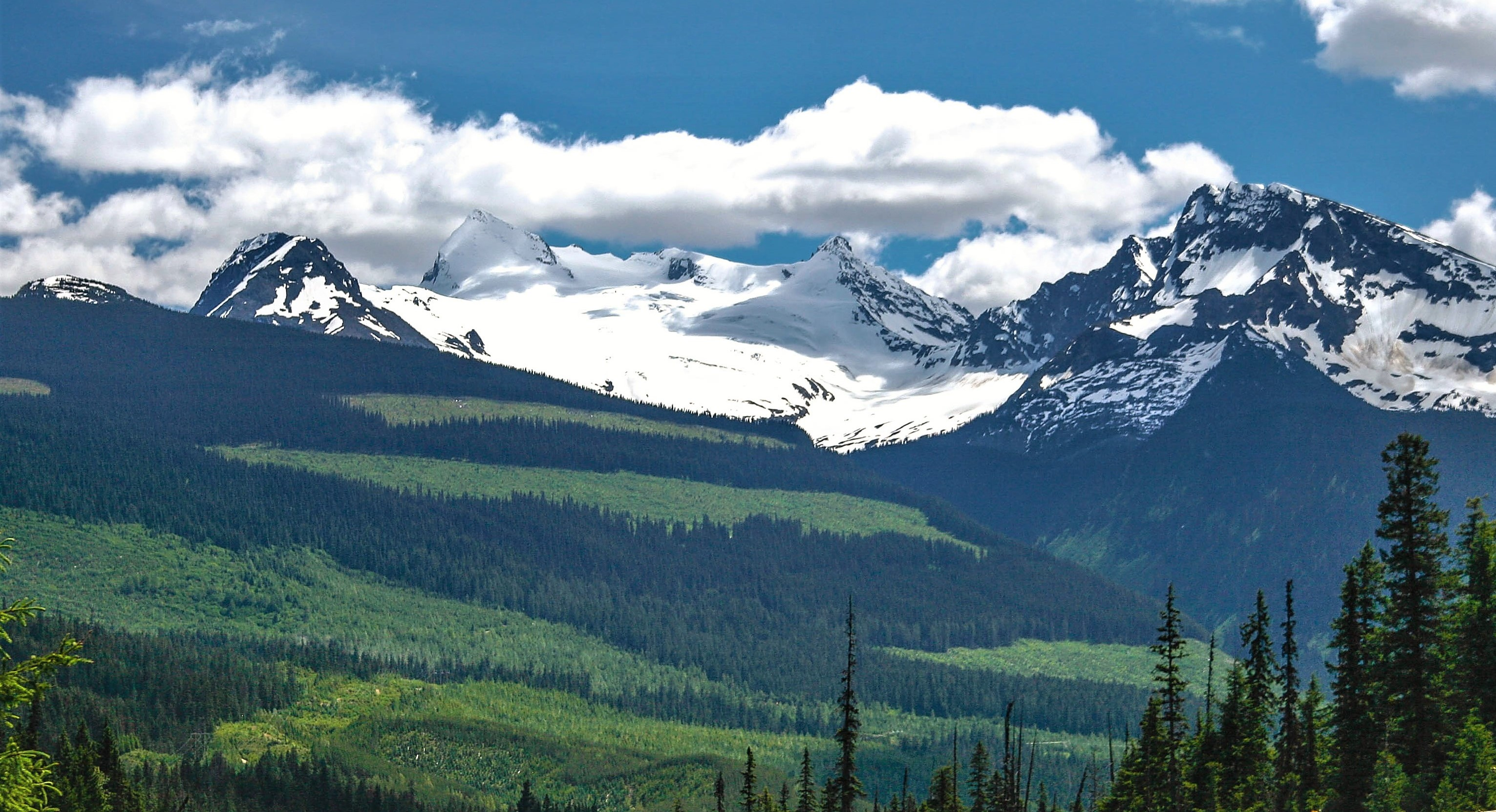
- Northwest aspect, from Highway 5

Highest point
- Elevation: 3,052 m (10,013 ft)
- Prominence: 972 m (3,189 ft)
- Parent peak: Dominion Mountain (3,131 m)
- Isolation: 8.4 km (5.2 mi)
- Listing: Mountains of British Columbia
- Coordinates: 52°30′10″N 118°59′45″W

Geography
- Location within British Columbia Location within Canada
- Interactive map of Mount Albreda
- Location: British Columbia, Canada
- District: Kamloops Division Yale Land District
- Parent range: Monashee Mountains; Malton Range
- Topo map: NTS 83D10 Ptarmigan Creek

Climbing
- First ascent: 1924

Mount Albreda is a mountain in British Columbia, Canada.

== Description ==
Mount Albreda, elevation 3,052 metres (10,013 feet), is the fifth-highest summit in the Monashee Mountains. Situated immediately east of the Albreda River, this prominent peak is visible from Highway 5. Precipitation runoff and glacier meltwater from Mount Albreda drains into tributaries of the Albreda River. Topographic relief is significant as the summit rises 1,850 metres (6,070 ft) above Dominion Creek in three kilometres (1.9 mi). The nearest higher neighbour is Dominion Mountain, 8.0 km (5.0 mi) to the south-southeast.

== History ==
Mount Albreda is named in association with Albreda River, which was named in 1863 by Dr. Walter Cheadle and Viscount Milton for Milton's aunt, Lady Albreda Elizabeth Wentworth-Fitzwilliam (1829–1891), youngest daughter of the 5th Earl Fitzwilliam. Cheadle originally named this prominent glacier-clad peak "Mount Milton" after Viscount Milton, but a mapmaking error resulted in the present circumstances. The mountain's toponym was officially adopted April 7, 1965, by the Geographical Names Board of Canada.

The first documented ascent of the summit was made July 18, 1924, by Allen Carpé and Professor Rollin Thomas Chamberlin (son of Thomas Chrowder Chamberlin) via the north glacier and east ridge. A possibility exists that employees of the Canadian Northern Railway may have preceded in reaching the summit, but details have been lost to time.

== Climate ==
Based on the Köppen climate classification, Mount Albreda is located in a subarctic climate zone with cold, snowy winters, and mild summers. Winter temperatures can drop below −20 °C with wind chill factors below −30 °C. This climate supports glaciers on the northern slopes of the mountain.

== Gallery ==
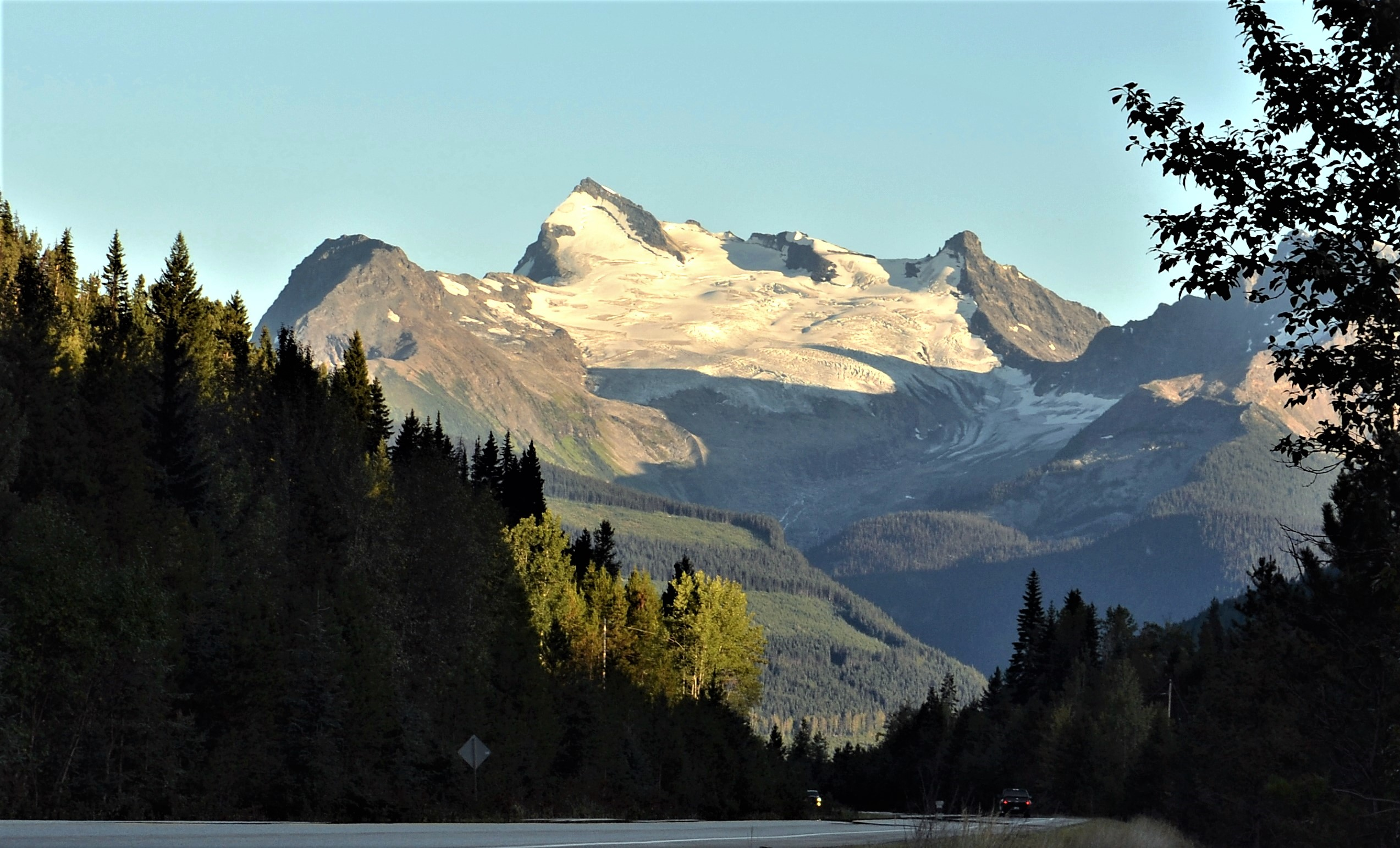
Mount Albreda

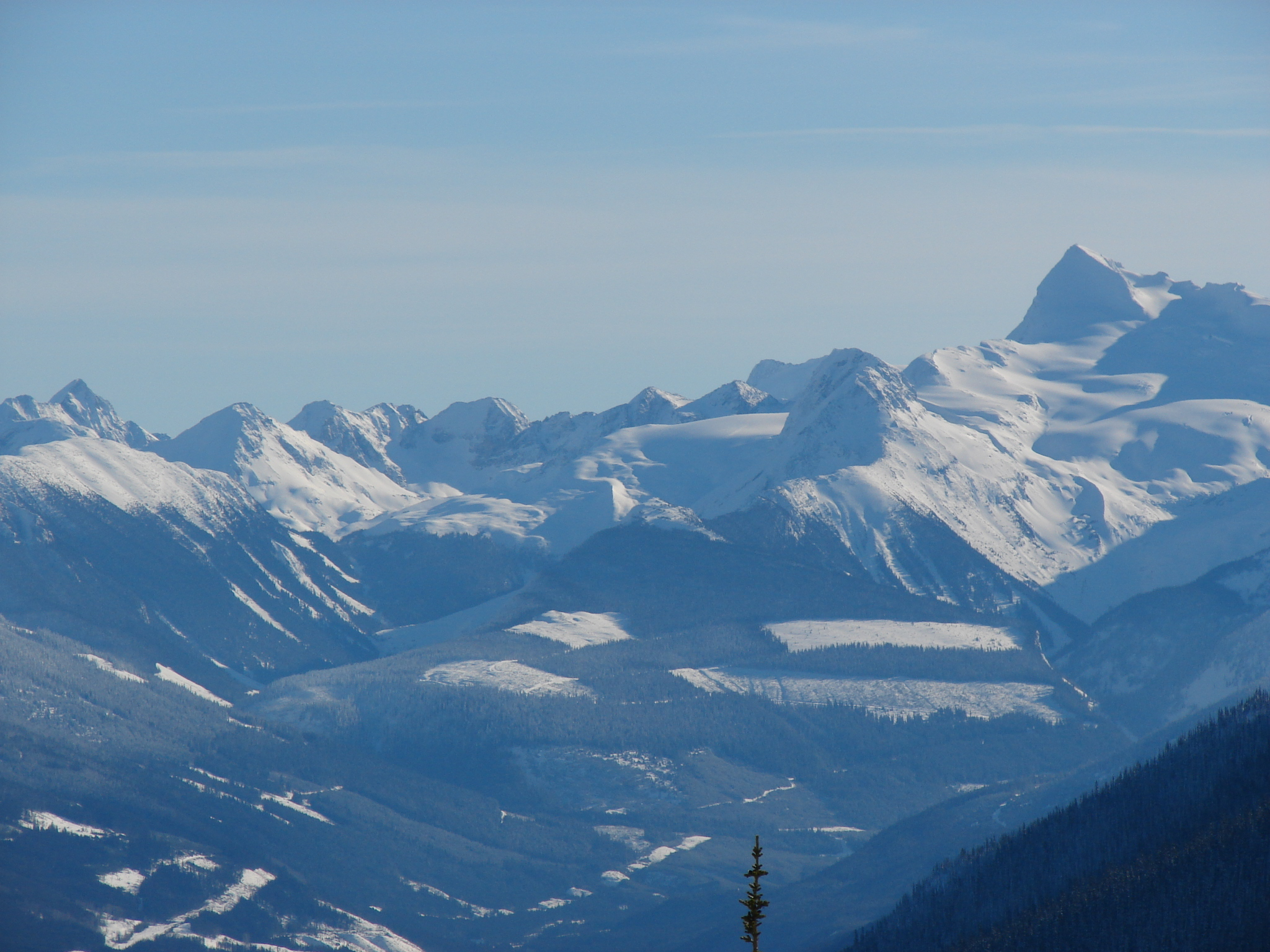
Mount Albreda (right) in winter

== See also ==
- Geography of British Columbia
