= Red Bridge (Kamloops) =

Bridge over South Thompson River in Kamloops, British Columbia

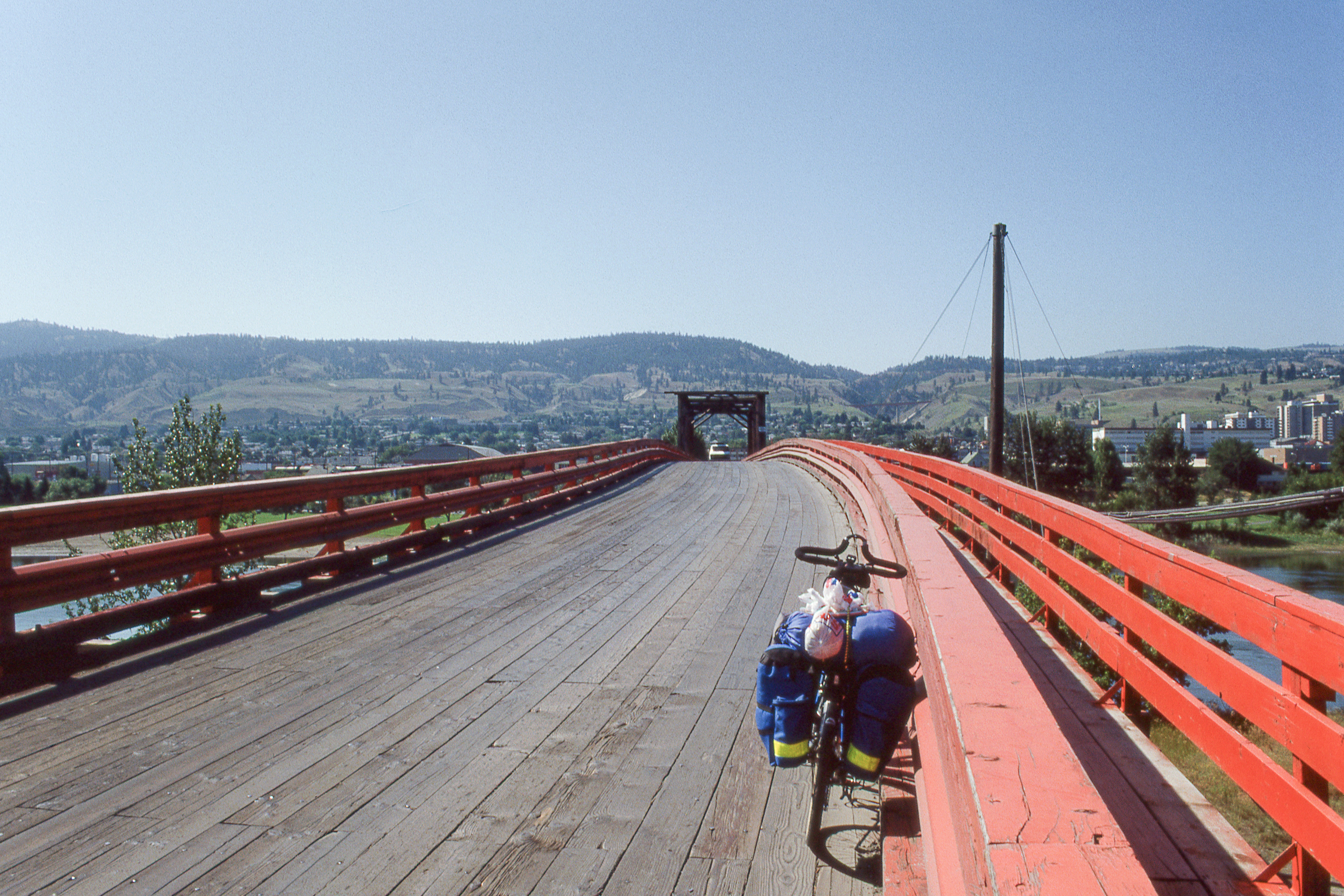
- The Red Bridge in July 1990
- Coordinates: 50°40′48.1″N 120°19′29.7″W
- Carried: Two lanes of Mt. Paul Way, pedestrians
- Crossed: South Thompson River
- Locale: Kamloops, British Columbia

Characteristics
- Design: Howe wooden truss
- Total length: 400 m

History
- Opened: 1936
- Destroyed: September 19, 2024

Location
- Interactive map of Red Bridge

The Red Bridge was a road bridge that spanned the South Thompson River in Kamloops, British Columbia. The 400-metre-long (1,300 ft) bridge carried two narrow road lanes of Mt. Paul Way between Lorne Street on the south bank of the river to the Mt. Paul industrial area on the north side. Mt. Paul Way then continued for 1.3 km (0.81 mi) through the industrial park to intersect with Highway 5. The Red Bridge was of the Howe truss design, and was one of the only remaining functioning bridges of this type in British Columbia. It was completely destroyed by fire on September 19, 2024.

The bridge got its name from the red-coloured paint applied to the bridge's piers and, more prominently, pedestrian handrails. This legacy stretches back to the first and second bridges, meaning the name was already well-established by the time the current bridge was built. The wood surrounding the piers had not been repainted in many years, so the colour was barely visible, but a recent repainting along the edges of the bridge deck and the pedestrian handrails displayed the namesake colour well.

== History ==
The 1936 bridge was the third to open in that location. The first, which replaced a ferry, officially called the Government Bridge, was constructed in 1887; it contained a swing span to accommodate river traffic. In 1909, flooding in the region damaged the wooden structure of the bridge, and it was replaced in 1912. The 1912 bridge was destroyed by a fire in 1934 ignited by a spark thrown from a passing paddle steamer. The bridge erected in 1936 was the current structure as of 2024, although it saw many modifications and heavy repair in the 88 years that it stood. On September 19, 2024, The Red Bridge was destroyed by fire and three spans collapsed into the South Thompson River.

Historically, the bridge carried Highway 5 (then known simply as the North Thompson Highway) over the South Thompson, but this changed in 1968 when the new four-lane Yellowhead Bridge opened about 2 km (1.2 mi) upstream, rerouting the highway on a new alignment through the Kamloops Indian Reserve.

Built at a time when automobiles were smaller and horse-and-buggy transport was still common (in Kamloops), the bridge was one of the narrowest two-lane roadways in the city. It had a total width over the main span of only 17 feet (5.2 m), just wide enough to accommodate two 8-foot-wide (2.4 m) semi trailers side by side, with less than a foot of total room to spare. This was a regular occurrence prior to 1968, when the bridge serviced Highway 5. The width restriction often meant impromptu traffic control had to be put in place to allow only one truck to pass over the bridge at a time, especially if it was an oversized load. At the time of destruction, the bridge had a weight restriction of 4,000 kg (630 st; 8,800 lb), and had ample signage warning drivers of this. Despite this, incidents have occurred, including a well-documented encounter in February 2020 in which a fully loaded lumber truck, most likely weighing close to 16,000 kg (2,500 st; 35,000 lb), passed over the bridge. On September 17, 2024, the Red Bridge caught fire at 6:45 AM and was closed for 24 hours. Around 3:00 AM on September 19, 2024, the Red Bridge was fully destroyed by a second fire.

== See also ==
- List of bridges in Canada
