= Canoe Mountain (British Columbia) =

Mountain in British Columbia, Canada

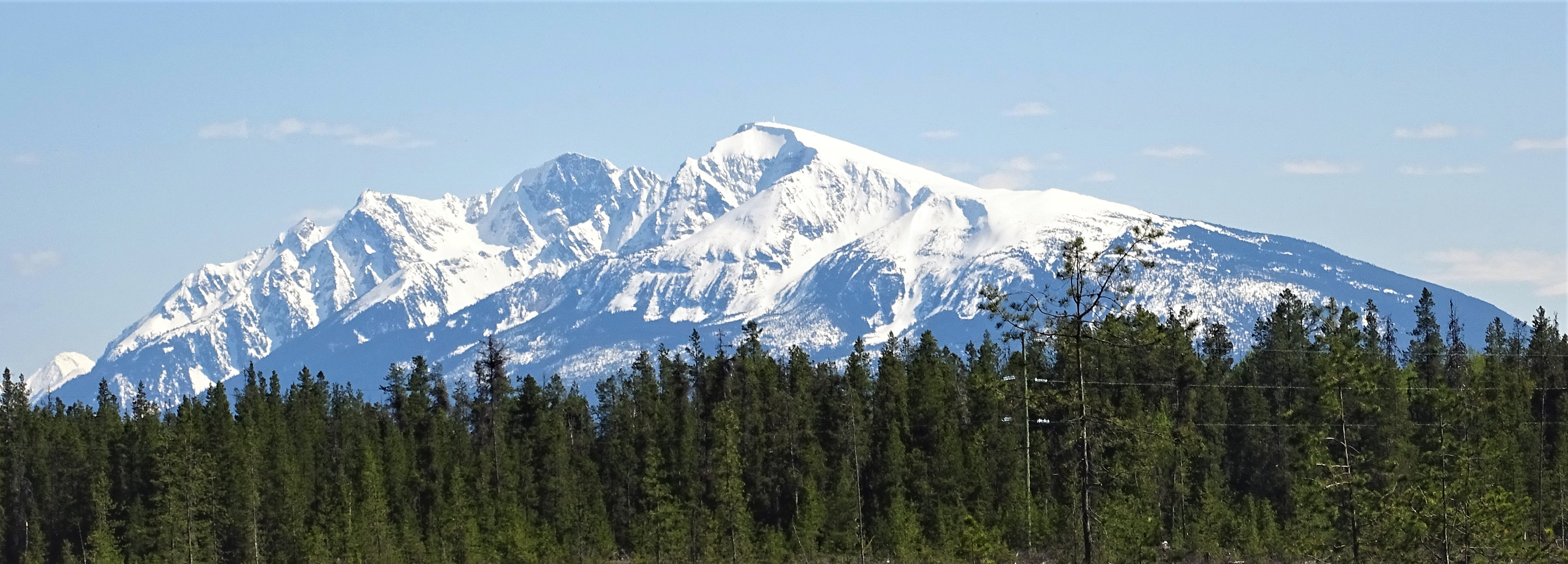
- North aspect

Highest point
- Elevation: 2,651 m (8,698 ft)
- Prominence: 166 m (545 ft)
- Isolation: 23.34 km (14.50 mi)
- Listing: Mountains of British Columbia
- Coordinates: 52°42′14″N 119°09′47″W

Geography
- Location within British Columbia Location within Canada
- Interactive map of Canoe Mountain
- Location: British Columbia, Canada
- District: Cariboo Land District
- Parent range: Monashee Mountains; Malton Range
- Topo map: NTS 83D11 Canoe Mountain

Climbing
- Easiest route: class 1 hiking

Canoe Mountain is a 2,651-metre-elevation (8,698 ft) mountain summit in British Columbia, Canada.

== Description ==
Canoe Mountain is 16 kilometres (9.9 mi) south-southeast of the community of Valemount, at the northern end of the Malton Range, which is a subset of the Monashee Mountains. The Southern Yellowhead Highway traverses the western base of the mountain. Precipitation runoff from Canoe Mountain drains west into Camp Creek which is a tributary of the Canoe River, as well as east into Kinbasket Lake. Topographic relief is significant as the summit rises 1,920 metres (6,300 ft) above the lake in 5 kilometres (3.1 mi). The steep north aspect of the mountain holds a cirque, whereas an unpaved fire service road climbs the modest west slope to a telecommunications tower at the top. The mountain's long-established local name was officially adopted 16 November 1976 by the Geographical Names Board of Canada.

== Climate ==
Based on the Köppen climate classification, Canoe Mountain is located in a subarctic climate zone with cold, snowy winters, and mild summers. Temperatures in winter can drop below −20 °C with wind chill factors below −30 °C.

== Gallery ==
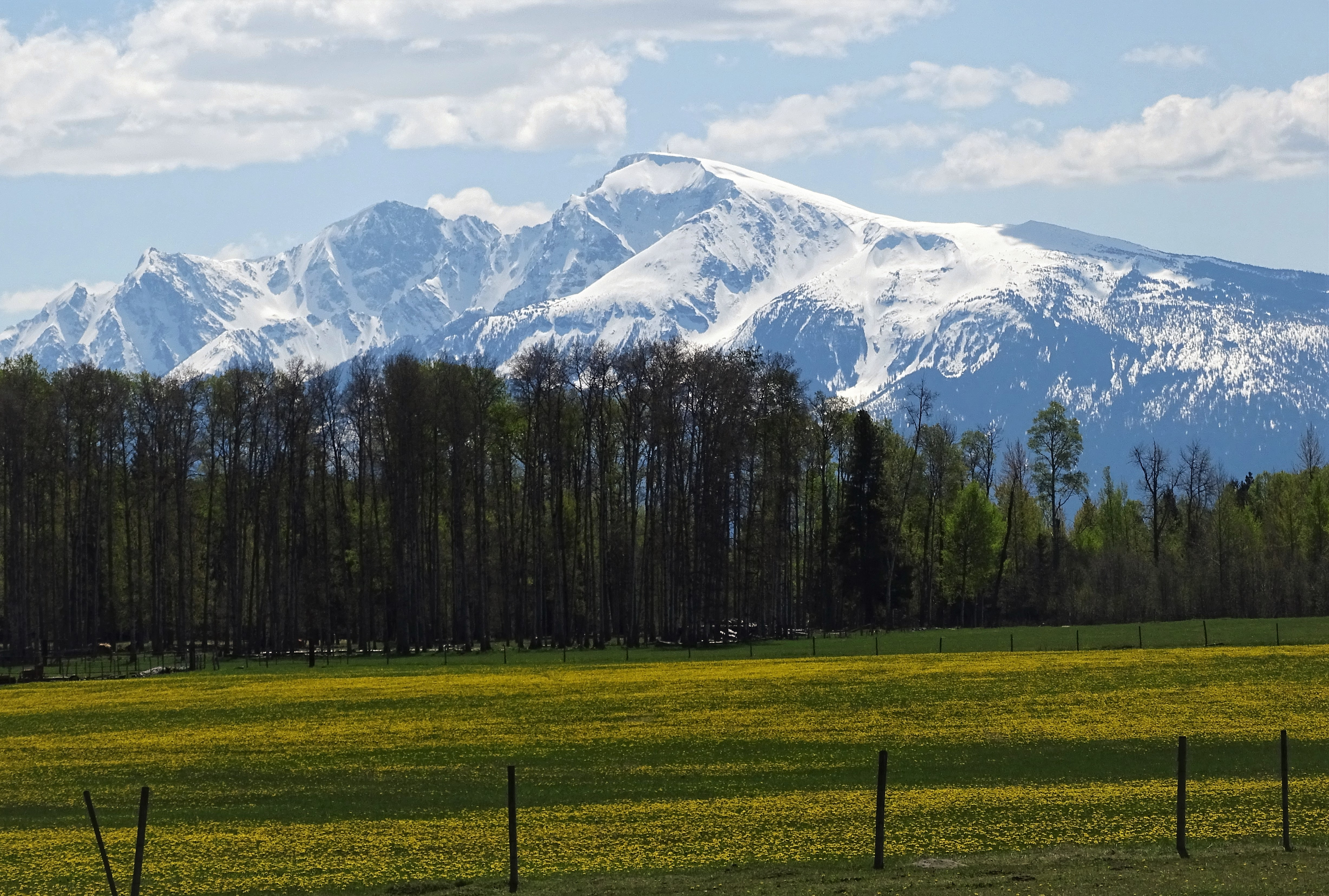
Canoe Mountain centred, Mount Thompson to left

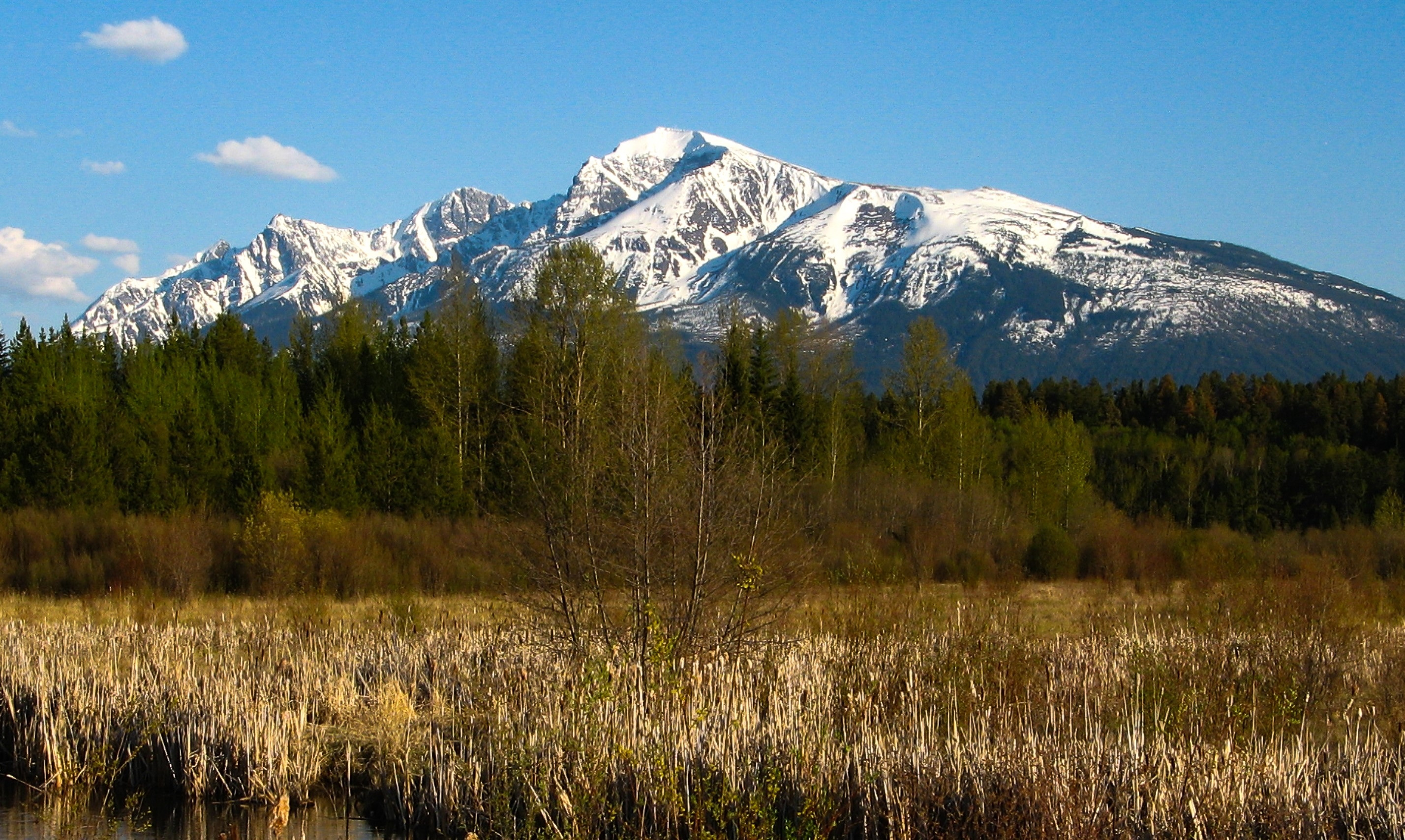
North aspect of Canoe Mountain

== See also ==
- Geography of British Columbia
