= Fraser Pass =

Mountain pass in British Columbia, Canada

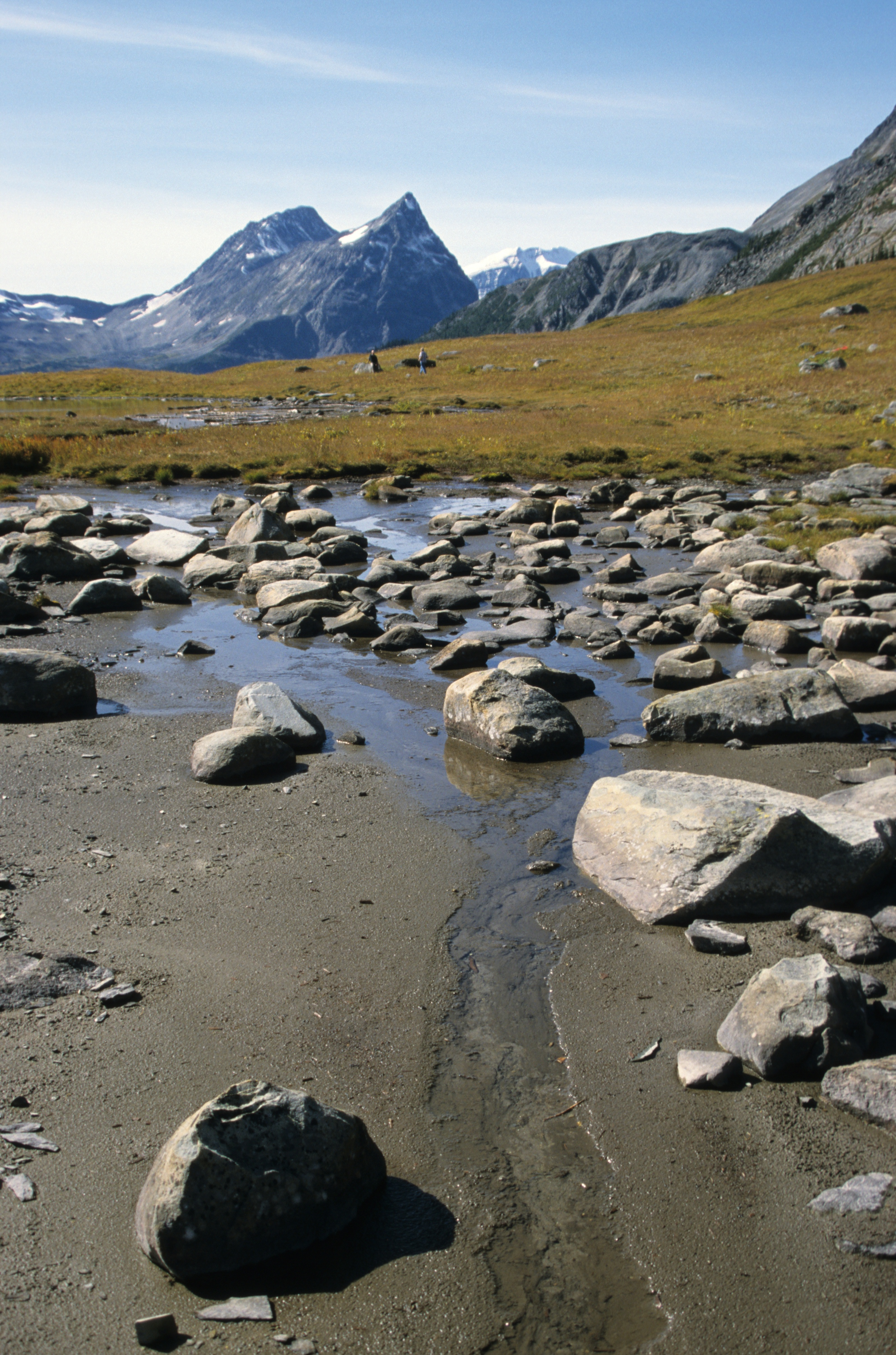
- Source of Fraser River at Fraser Pass

- Location within British Columbia
- Elevation: 2,015 m (6,611 ft)

Third Approach
- Location: British Columbia, Canada
- Range: Canadian Rockies
- Coordinates: 52°30′59″N 118°16′04″W
- Topo map: NTS 83D9 Amethyst Lakes

The Fraser Pass is a mountain pass in the British Columbian Rockies of Western Canada. Its summit is 2,015 m (6,611 ft) above sea level. Although immediately adjacent to the Continental Divide, the pass does not cross it; rather, it bridges the drainage basins of the Fraser River and Columbia River, both Pacific-draining rivers.

The pass is drained to the north by the Fraser River, with a dripping spring just west of a pond at Fraser Pass being the source of British Columbia's longest river. The south side of the pass is drained by Hugh Allan Creek, which flows into Canoe Reach, the north arm of Kinbasket Lake that is the reservoir behind Mica Dam on the Columbia River.

Fraser Pass is difficult to reach. Access by foot requires about 40 km (25 mi) of bushwhacking from the Yellowhead Highway near Lucerne Campground. The most feasible access is by a 25-minute helicopter flight from Valemount. Beautiful British Columbia Magazine first identified the source of the Fraser River during an expedition to Fraser Pass in 1985. Group tours by helicopter to the source of the Fraser are offered every few years by Wells Gray Tours.

== See also ==
- List of passes of the Rocky Mountains
