= Albreda River =

River in British Columbia, Canada

- Location of the mouth of the river in British Columbia

Location
- Country: Canada
- Province: British Columbia
- Land District: Kamloops Division Yale
- Region: British Columbia Interior
- Regional Districts: Thompson-Nicola & Fraser-Fort George

Physical characteristics
- Source: unnamed confluence
  - location: Regional District of Fraser-Fort George
  - coordinates: 52°28′43″N 119°07′51″W
  - elevation: 878 m (2,881 ft)
- Mouth: North Thompson River
  - location: Thompson-Nicola Regional District
  - coordinates: 52°28′43″N 119°07′51″W
  - elevation: 733 m (2,405 ft)

Basin features
- River system: Pacific Ocean drainage basin

The Albreda River is a river in Thompson-Nicola Regional District and the Regional District of Fraser-Fort George in the Interior region of British Columbia, Canada. It is in the Pacific Ocean drainage basin and is a left tributary of the North Thompson River. The nearest communities to the mouth of the creek on British Columbia Highway 5 are Blue River 42 kilometres (26 mi) south and Valemount 48 kilometres (30 mi) north; the mouth of the river is at a point where the North Thompson River, arriving downstream from its source, turns 90° right and heads south.

== Course ==
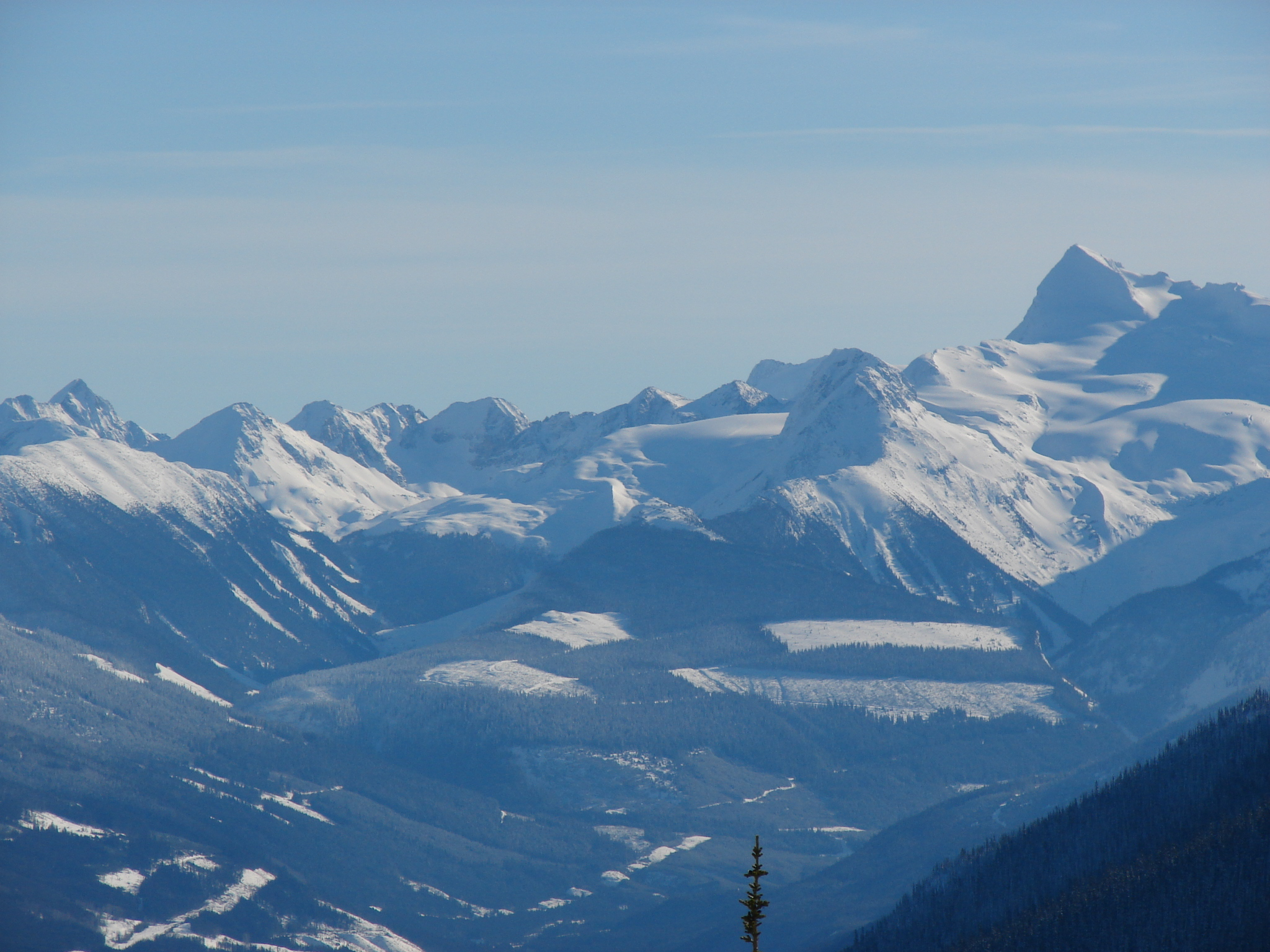
Mt. Albreda, in the Monashee Mountains and Clemina Creek, a tributary of the Albreda River

The creek begins at an unnamed confluence in the Regional District of Fraser-Fort George, heads southwest under British Columbia Highway 5 and the Canadian National Railway transcontinental main line (used by freight traffic and the Via Rail Canadian train), and turns southeast. The highway and railway line follow the Albreda River valley, crossing several times, for the balance of its course. The river passes into Thompson-Nicola Regional District at the locality of Albreda, flows through Albreda Lake, turns south, and reaches its mouth at the North Thompson River, at the railway point of Goswell, towered over by Mount Albreda, part of the Monashee Mountains and the source of the tributary Clemina Creek and Dora Creek, to the east. The North Thompson River flows via the Thompson River and the Fraser River to the Pacific Ocean.

The start of the Albreda River is at the drainage divide between the North Thompson River and Columbia River drainage basins. On the other side of the divide, Camp Creek flows via the Canoe River to Kinbasket Lake on the Columbia River.

== Tributaries ==
- Dominion Creek (left)
- Allan Creek (right)
- Dora Creek (left)
- Clemina Creek (left)
- Robina Creek (left)
- Albreda Creek (left)

== See also ==
- List of rivers of British Columbia
