= Cameron Street Bridge =

- Coordinates: 53.9273°N 122.7671°W
- Carries: 2 lanes of Cameron Street
- Crosses: Nechako River
- Locale: Prince George, British Columbia
- Maintained by: City of Prince George

Characteristics
- Design: Continuous steel girder
- Total length: 208 metres (682 ft)

History
- Opened: August 24, 2009

Location
- Interactive map of Cameron Street Bridge

The Cameron Street Bridge is a two-lane, 208 metre (682 feet) long continuous steel girder bridge in Prince George, British Columbia. It crosses the Nechako River, connecting the city's downtown on the river's southern side, to the Hart, a residential area on the north side of the river. Construction of the bridge began in May 2008, and the bridge was completed and opened to traffic on August 24, 2009.

The distinctive Howe truss design of the old bridge (since demolished) made it a city landmark.

The current bridge is actually the third bridge in the city carrying Cameron Street over the Nechako River. The original Cameron Street Bridge was built in 1916, but it was destroyed six years later due to an ice jam on the Nechako River.

The second Cameron Street Bridge, a single-lane wooden Howe truss bridge, was built in 1931. Traffic was directed over the single-lane structure by means of traffic signals located at both ends of the bridge. The second bridge was closed in September 2005 due to structural problems. Due to the bridge's unique design, various ideas about saving the structure were considered (such as conversion to a pedestrian-only bridge). Eventually, the decision was made to demolish the old bridge and replace it with the current modern structure. However, the city decided to preserve the bridge's history by building a replica Howe truss bridge (with informative signage) carrying foot traffic nearby in Cottonwood Island Park.
