= Big Shale Hill =

Hill in Alberta and British Columbia, Canada

- Location within Alberta Location within British Columbia Location within Canada

Highest point
- Elevation: 2,405 m (7,890 ft)
- Prominence: 280 m (920 ft)
- Coordinates: 53°36′04″N 119°47′27″W

Geography
- Location: Alberta; British Columbia
- Topo map: NTS 83E12 Pauline Creek

Big Shale Hill is located on the border of Alberta and British Columbia. The name is thought to come from the thick layer of shale on the mountain.

== See also ==
- List of peaks on the Alberta–British Columbia border
- Mountains of Alberta
- Mountains of British Columbia
