= Fraser River =

River in British Columbia, Canada

Fraser River Staulo, Lhtako, Tacoutche Tesse, ʔElhdaqox, Sto:lo
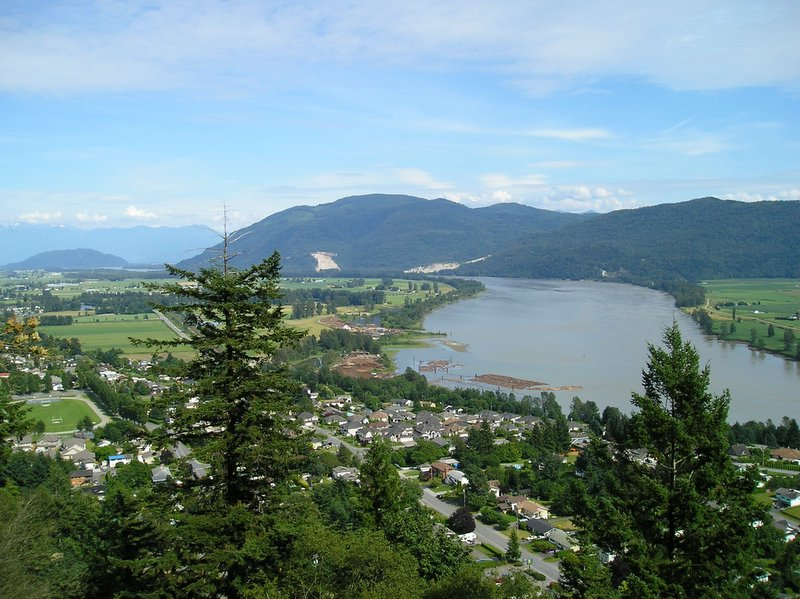
- The Fraser River, from the grounds of Westminster Abbey, above Hatzic in Mission, British Columbia, looking upstream (E)

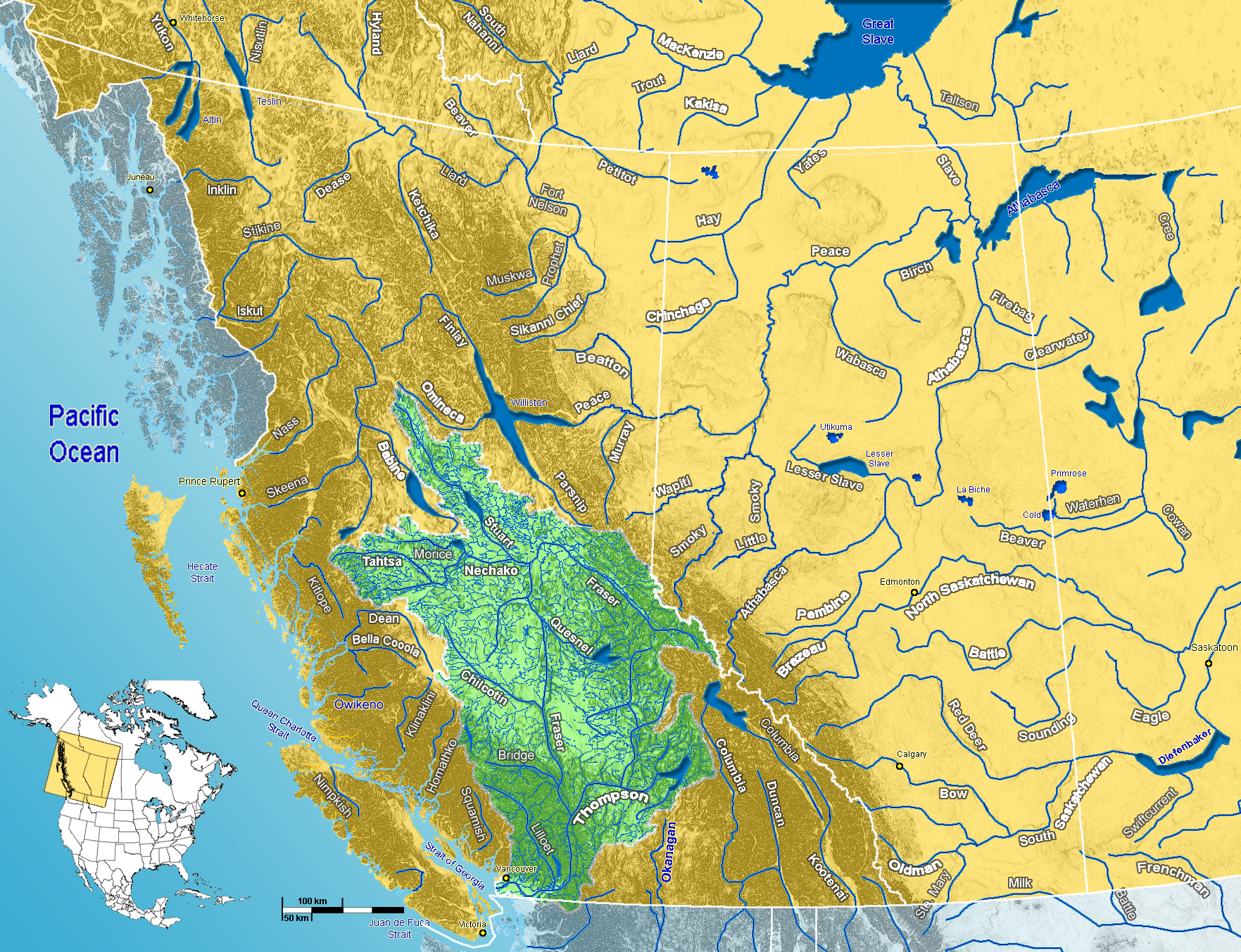
- Fraser River watershed
- The Fraser River and its source
- Etymology: Fur trader and explorer Simon Fraser

Location
- Country: Canada
- Province: British Columbia
- Regional districts: Fraser-Fort George; Cariboo; Thompson-Nicola; Squamish-Lillooet; Fraser Valley; Metro Vancouver
- Cities: Upstream; McBride; Prince George; Quesnel; Hope; Fraser Valley; Chilliwack; Abbotsford; Mission; Metro Vancouver; Maple Ridge; Township of Langley; Pitt Meadows; Surrey; Port Coquitlam; Coquitlam; New Westminster; Delta; Burnaby; Richmond; Vancouver

Physical characteristics
- Source: Fraser Pass
  - location: Mount Robson Provincial Park, Rocky Mountains, British Columbia, Canada
  - coordinates: 52°37′41″N 118°25′50″W
  - elevation: 2,145 m (7,037 ft)
- Mouth: Fraser River Delta
  - location: Strait of Georgia, Vancouver, British Columbia, Canada
  - coordinates: 49°10′40″N 123°12′45″W
  - elevation: 0 m (0 ft)
- Length: 1,375 km (854 mi)
- Basin size: 220,000 km^{2} (85,000 sq mi)
- Discharge
  - location: mouth (average and min); max at Hope
  - average: 3,475 m^{3}/s (122,700 cu ft/s)
  - minimum: 575 m^{3}/s (20,300 cu ft/s)
  - maximum: 17,000 m^{3}/s (600,000 cu ft/s)

Basin features
- Tributaries
  - left: Bowron River, Willow River, Quesnel River, Thompson River, Coquihalla River, Chilliwack River, Sumas River, Salmon River (lower mainland)
  - right: Morkill River, McGregor River, Salmon River (interior), Nechako River, West Road (Blackwater) River, Chilcotin River, Bridge River, Harrison River, Stave River, Pitt River, Coquitlam River
- Protection status

Ramsar Wetland
- Official name: Fraser River Delta
- Designated: 24 May 1982
- Reference no.: 243

The Fraser River (/ˈfreɪzər/) is the longest river within British Columbia, Canada, rising at Fraser Pass near Blackrock Mountain in the Rocky Mountains and flowing for 1,375 kilometres (854 mi), into the Strait of Georgia just south of the City of Vancouver. The river's annual discharge at its mouth is 112 cubic kilometres (27 mi^{3}) or 3,550 cubic metres per second (125,000 cu ft/s), and each year, it discharges about 20 million tons of sediment into the ocean.

== Naming ==
The river is named after Simon Fraser, who led an expedition in 1808 on behalf of the North West Company from the site of present-day Prince George almost to the mouth of the river. The river's name in the Halqemeylem (Upriver Halkomelem) language is Sto:lo, often seen archaically as Staulo, and has been adopted by the Halkomelem-speaking peoples of the Lower Mainland as their collective name, Sto:lo. The river's name in the Dakelh language is Lhtakoh. The Tsilhqot'in name for the river, not dissimilar to the Dakelh name, is ʔElhdaqox, meaning Sturgeon (ʔElhda-chugh) River (Yeqox).

== Course ==
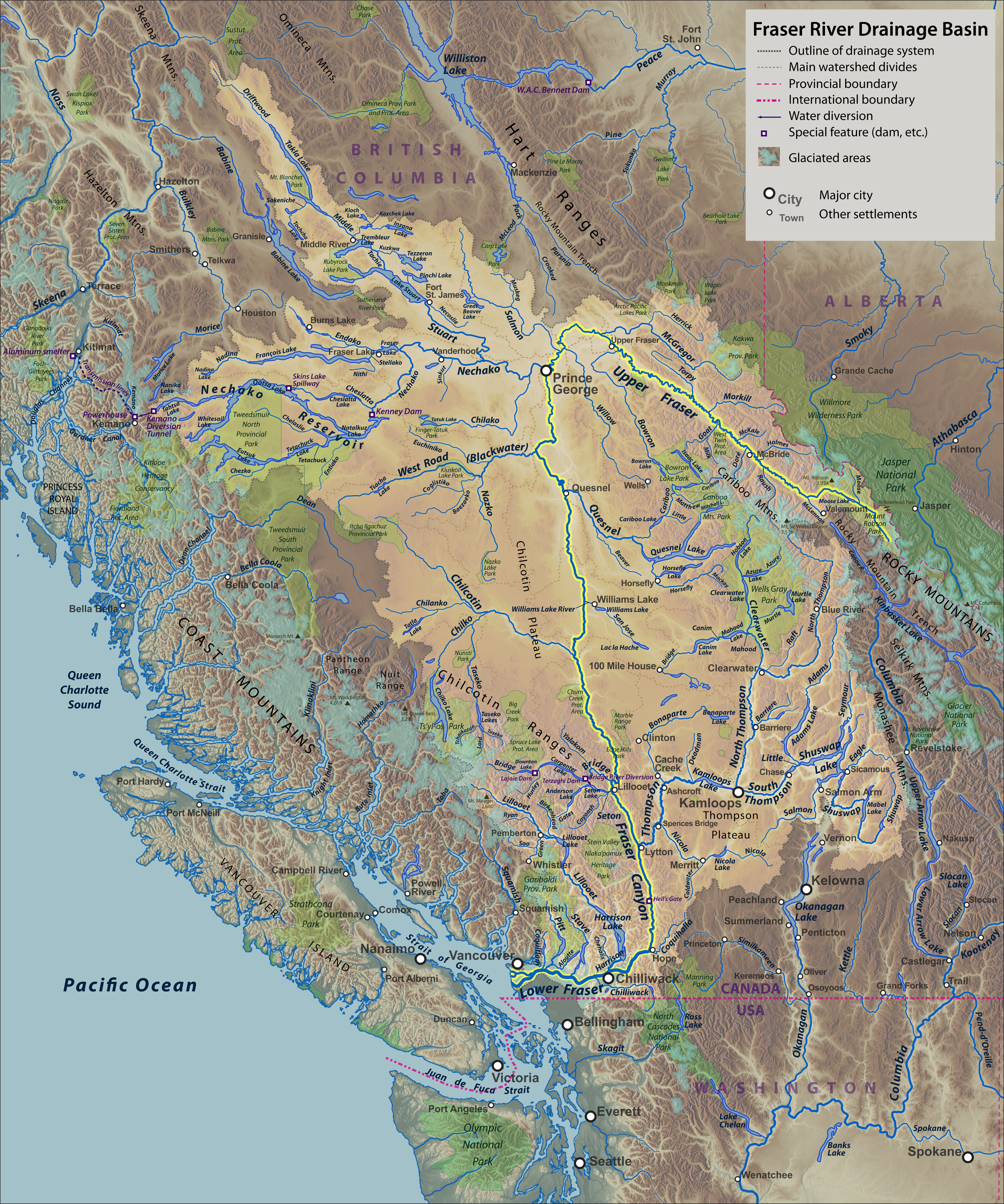
Fraser River drainage basin

The Fraser drains a 220,000-square-kilometre (85,000 mi^{2}) area. Its source is a dripping spring at Fraser Pass in the Canadian Rocky Mountains near the border with Alberta. The river then flows north to the Yellowhead Highway and west past Mount Robson to the Rocky Mountain Trench and the Robson Valley near Valemount. After running northwest past 54° north, it makes a sharp turn to the south at Giscome Portage, meeting the Nechako River at the city of Prince George, then continues south, progressively cutting deeper into the Fraser Plateau to form the Fraser Canyon from roughly the confluence of the Chilcotin River, near the city of Williams Lake, southwards. It is joined by the Bridge and Seton Rivers at the town of Lillooet, then by the Thompson River at Lytton, where it proceeds south until it is approximately 64 kilometres (40 mi) north of the 49th parallel, which is Canada's border with the United States.

From Lytton southwards it runs through a progressively deeper canyon between the Lillooet Ranges of the Coast Mountains on its west and the Cascade Range on its east. Hell's Gate, located immediately downstream of the town of Boston Bar, is a famous portion of the canyon where the walls narrow dramatically, forcing the entire volume of the river through a gap only 35 metres (115 feet) wide. An aerial tramway takes visitors out over the river. Hells Gate is visible from Trans-Canada Highway 1 about 2 kilometres (1.2 mi) south of the tramway. Simon Fraser was forced to portage the gorge on his trip through the canyon in June 1808.

At Yale, at the head of navigation on the river, the canyon opens up and the river widens, though without much adjoining lowland until Hope, where the river then turns west and southwest into the Fraser Valley, a lush lowland valley, and runs past Chilliwack and the confluence of the Harrison and Sumas Rivers, bending northwest at Abbotsford and Mission.

The Fraser then flows past Maple Ridge, Pitt Meadows, Port Coquitlam, and north Surrey. It turns southwest again just east of New Westminster, where it splits into the North Arm, which is the southern boundary of the City of Vancouver, and the South Arm, which divides the City of Richmond from the City of Delta to the south. Richmond is on the largest island in the Fraser, Lulu Island and also on Sea Island, which is the location of Vancouver International Airport, where the Middle Arm branches off to the south from the North Arm. The far eastern end of Lulu Island is named Queensborough and is part of the City of New Westminster. Also in the lowermost Fraser, among other smaller islands, is Annacis Island, an important industrial and port area, which lies to the southeast of the eastern end of Lulu Island. Other notable islands in the lower Fraser are Barnston Island, Matsqui Island, Nicomen Island and Sea Bird Island. Other islands lie on the outer side of the estuary, most notably Westham Island, a wildfowl preserve, and Iona Island, the location of the main sewage plant for the City of Vancouver.

The Fraser's delta empties into the Strait of Georgia between the mainland and Vancouver Island; the lands south of the City of Vancouver, including the cities of Richmond and Delta, sit on the flat flood plain. The islands of the delta include Iona Island, Sea Island, Lulu Island, Annacis Island, and a number of smaller islands. While the vast majority of the river's drainage basin lies within British Columbia, a small portion in the drainage basin lies across the international border in Washington in the United States, namely the upper reaches of the tributary Chilliwack and Sumas rivers. Most of lowland Whatcom County, Washington is part of the Fraser Lowland and was formed also by sediment deposited from the Fraser, though most of the county is not in the Fraser drainage basin.

Like the Columbia River Gorge east of Portland, Oregon, the Fraser exploits a topographic cleft between two mountain ranges separating a more continental climate (in this case, that of the British Columbia Interior) from a milder climate near the coast. When an Arctic high-pressure area moves into the British Columbia Interior and a relatively low-pressure area builds over the general Puget Sound and Strait of Georgia region, the cold Arctic air accelerates southwest through the Fraser Canyon. These outflow winds can gust up to 97 to 129 kilometres per hour (60 to 80 mph) and have at times exceeded 160 kilometres per hour (100 mph). Such winds frequently reach Bellingham and the San Juan Islands, gaining strength over the open water of the Strait of Juan de Fuca.

The estuary at the river's mouth is a site of hemispheric importance in the Western Hemisphere Shorebird Reserve Network.

=== Discharge ===
The Water Survey of Canada currently operates 17 gauge stations that measure discharge and water level along the majority of the mainstem from Red Pass just downstream of Moose Lake in the Mount Robson Provincial Park, to Steveston in Vancouver at the river mouth. With an average flow at the mouth of about 3,475 cubic metres per second (122,700 cu ft/s), the Fraser is the largest river by discharge flowing into the Pacific seaboard of Canada and the fifth largest in the country. The average flow is highly seasonal; summer discharge rates can be ten times larger than the flow during the winter.

The Fraser's highest recorded flow, in June 1894, is estimated to have been 17,000 cubic metres per second (600,000 cu ft/s) at Hope. It was calculated using high-water marks near the hydrometric station at Hope and various statistical methods. In 1948 the Fraser River Board adopted the estimate for the 1894 flood. It remains the value specified by regulatory agencies for all flood control work on the river. Further studies and hydraulic models have estimated the maximum discharge of the Fraser River at Hope during the 1894 flood as within a range of about 16,000 to 18,000 cubic metres per second (570,000 to 640,000 cu ft/s).

== History ==
The Maris Pacifici map published in 1589 features on the west coast of North America the first ever representation of two major coastline features: the delta of the Fraser River, labelled "Baia de las isleas", and the mouth of the Columbia River, identified as "Rio Grande". These rivers would therefore have been sighted by visitors long before official records would confirm. In spite of limited evidence of the Francis Drake expedition's whereabouts in the Pacific Northwest, BC history commentator Sam Bawlf posited that the Ortelius map was a proof that Drake sighted the mouth of the Fraser and came through the Strait of Juan de Fuca.

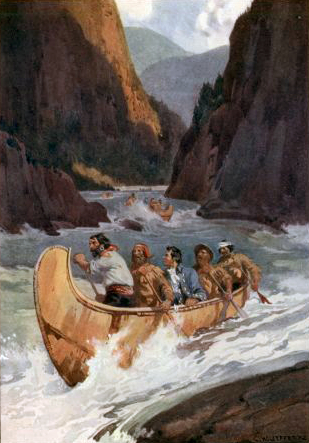
The Descent of the Fraser River, 1808, by C.W. Jefferys

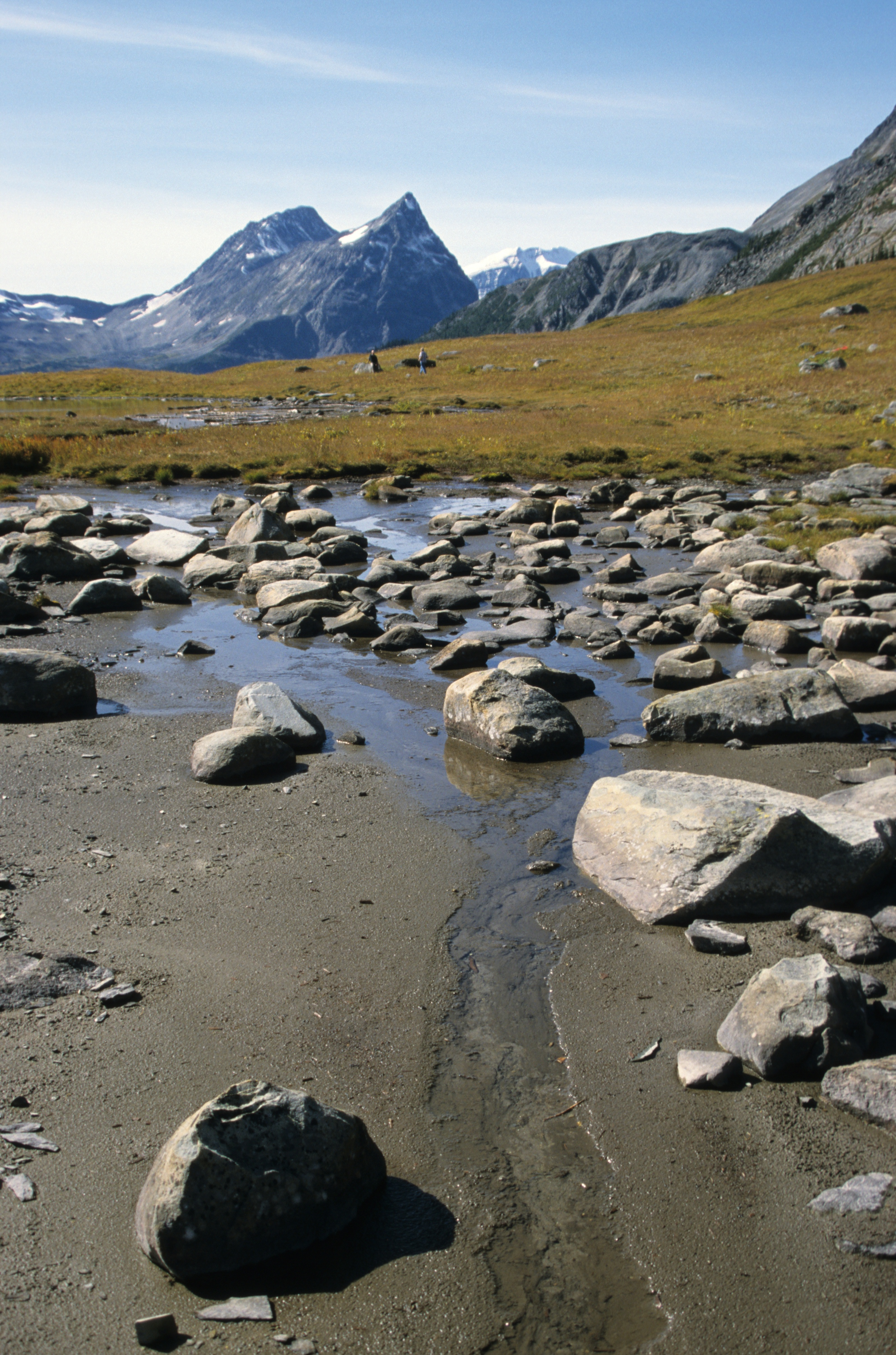
Source of Fraser River at Fraser Pass

On June 14, 1792, the Spanish explorers Dionisio Alcalá Galiano and Cayetano Valdés entered and anchored in the North Arm of the Fraser River, becoming the first Europeans to officially find and enter it. The existence of the river, but not its location, had been deduced during the 1791 voyage of José María Narváez, under Francisco de Eliza.

The upper reaches of the Fraser River were first explored by Sir Alexander Mackenzie in 1793, and fully traced by Simon Fraser in 1808, who confirmed that it was not connected with the Columbia River.

The lower Fraser was revisited in 1824 when the Hudson's Bay Company sent a crew across Puget Sound from its Fort George southern post on the Columbia River. The expedition was led by James McMillan. The Fraser was reached via the Nicomekl River and the Salmon River was reachable after a portage. McMillan's expedition reacquainted themselves with friendly tribes met earlier on by Simon Fraser's crew. A trading post with agricultural potential was to be located.

By 1827, a crew was sent back via the mouth of the Fraser to build and operate the original Fort Langley. McMillan also led the undertaking. The trading post original location would soon become the first ever mixed ancestry and agricultural settlement in southern British Columbia on the Fraser (Sto:lo) river.

In 1828, George Simpson visited the river, mainly to examine Fort Langley and determine whether it would be suitable as the Hudson's Bay Company's main Pacific depot. Simpson had believed the Fraser River might be navigable throughout its length, even though Simon Fraser had described it as non-navigable. Simpson journeyed down the river and through the Fraser Canyon and afterwards wrote "I should consider the passage down, to be certain Death, in nine attempts out of Ten. I shall therefore no longer talk about it as a navigable stream". His trip down the river convinced him that Fort Langley could not replace Fort Vancouver as the company's main depot on the Pacific coast.

Much of British Columbia's history has been bound to the Fraser, partly because it was the essential route between the Interior and the Lower Coast after the loss of the lands south of the 49th Parallel with the Oregon Treaty of 1846. It was the site of its first recorded settlements of Aboriginal people (the Musqueam, Sto:lo, St'at'imc, Secwepemc and Nlaka'pamŭ), the site of the first European-Indigenous mixed ancestry settlement in southern British-Columbia (Fort Langley), the route of multitudes of prospectors during the Fraser Canyon Gold Rush and the main vehicle of the province's early commerce and industry.

In 1998, the river was designated as a Canadian Heritage River for its natural and human heritage. It remains the longest river with that designation.

== Uses ==
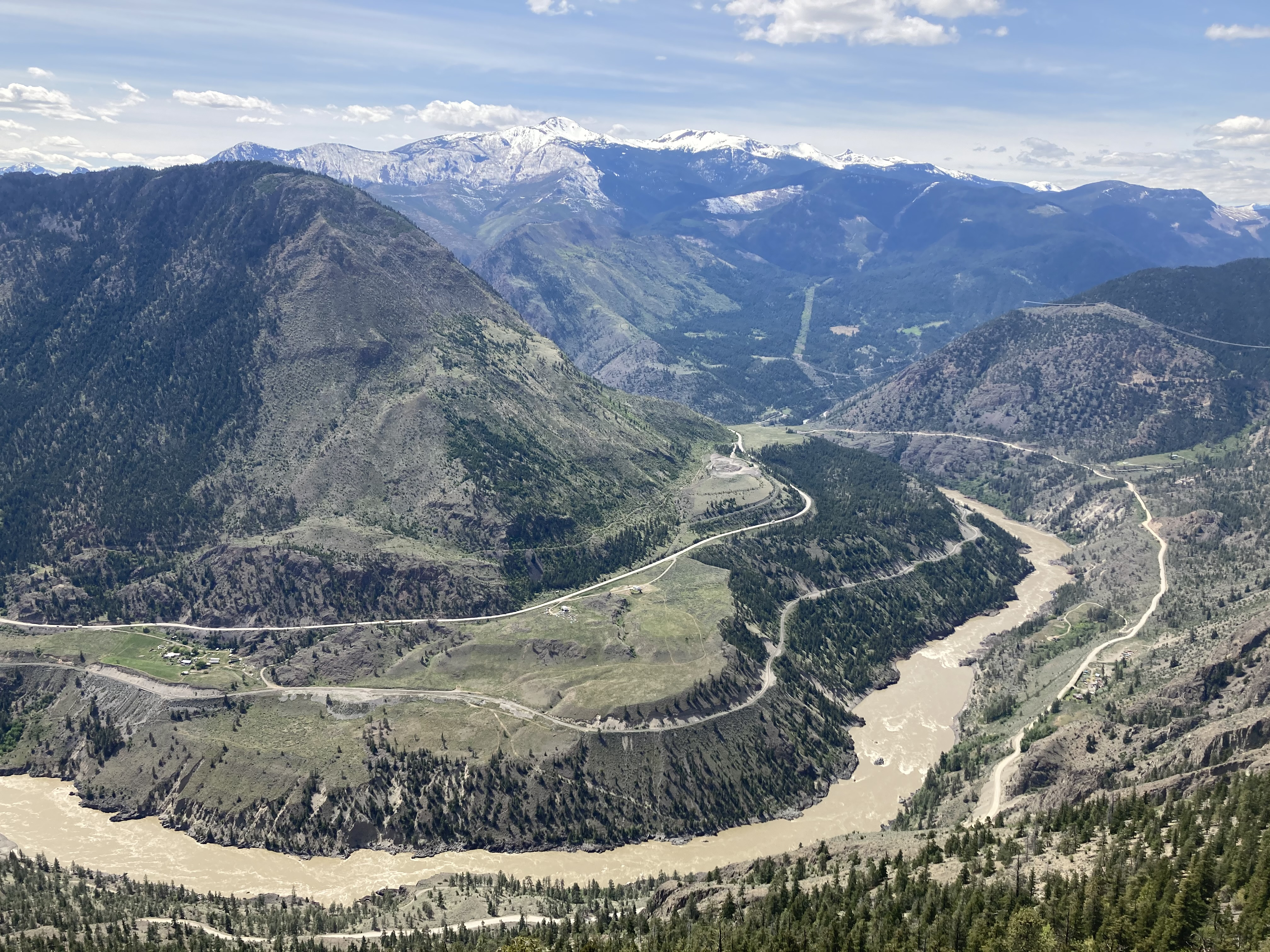
The Fraser near the community of Fountain

The Fraser is heavily exploited by human activities, especially in its lower reaches. Its banks are rich farmland, its water is used by pulp mills, and a few dams on some tributaries provide hydroelectric power. The main flow of the Fraser has never been dammed partly because its high level of sediment flows would result in a short dam lifespan, but mostly because of strong opposition from fisheries and other environmental concerns. In 1858, the Fraser River and surrounding areas were occupied when the gold rush came to the Fraser Canyon and the Fraser River. It is also a popular fishing location for residents of the Lower Mainland.

The delta of the river, especially in the Boundary Bay area, is an important stopover location for migrating shorebirds.

The Fraser Herald, a regional position within the Canadian Heraldic Authority, is named after the river.

== Fishing ==
The Fraser River is known for the fishing of white sturgeon, all five species of Pacific salmon (chinook, coho, chum, pink, sockeye), as well as steelhead trout. The Fraser River is also the largest producer of salmon in Canada. A typical white sturgeon catch can average about 500 pounds (230 kg). A white sturgeon weighing an estimated 500 kilograms (1,100 lb) and measuring 3.76 metres (12 ft 4 in) was caught and released on the Fraser River in July 2012. In 2021, a white sturgeon was caught on the river weighing 890 pounds (400 kg), with a length of 352 cm (11.55 ft). It was estimated to be over 100 years old. The fish was tagged and released.

== Flooding ==
The most significant Fraser river floods in recorded history occurred in 1894 and 1948.

=== 1894 flood ===
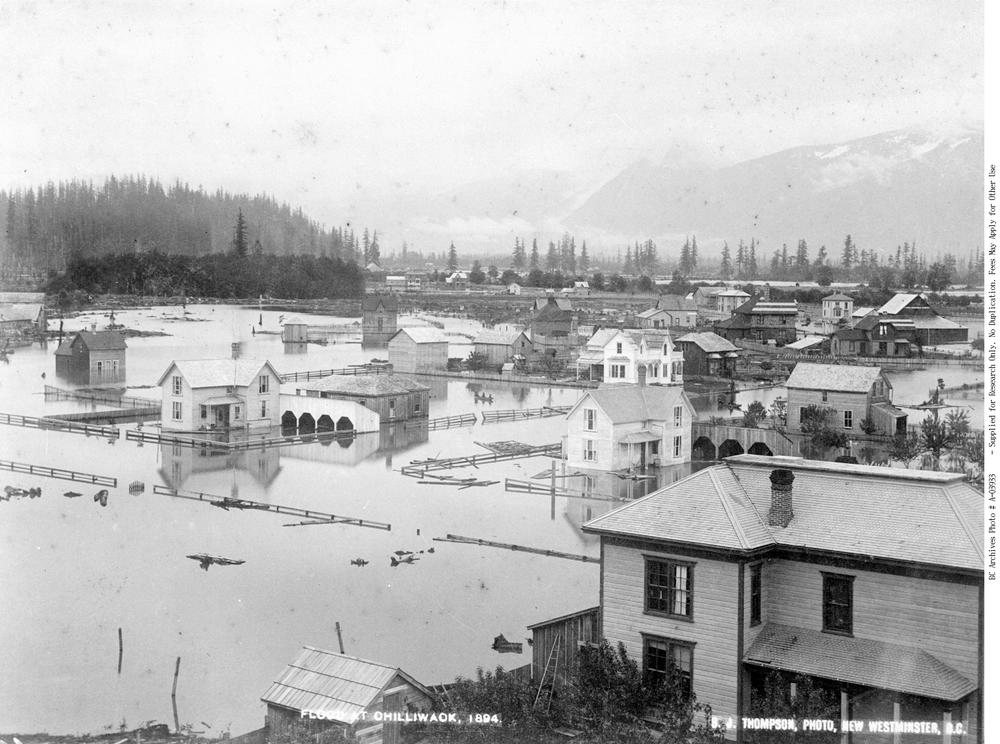
The Chilliwack flood of 1894

After European settlement, the first disastrous flood in the Lower Mainland (Fraser Valley and Metro Vancouver) occurred in 1894. With no protection against the rising waters of the Fraser River, Fraser Valley and Metro Vancouver communities from Chilliwack downstream were inundated with water. In the 1894 floods, the water mark at Mission reached 7.85 metres (25.75 ft).

After the 1894 flood, a dyking system was constructed throughout the Fraser Valley. The dyking and drainage projects greatly improved the flood problems, but over time, the dykes were allowed to fall into disrepair and became overgrown with brush and trees. With some dykes constructed of a wooden frame, they gave way in 1948 in several locations, marking the second disastrous flood. Flooding since 1948 has been minor in comparison.

=== 1948 flood ===
1948 saw massive flooding in Chilliwack and other areas along the Fraser River. The high-water mark at Mission rose to 7.5 metres (24.7 ft). The peak flow was about 15,600 cubic meters per second.

==== Timeline ====
- On May 28, 1948, the Semiault Creek Dyke broke.
- On May 29, 1948, dykes near Glendale (now Cottonwood Corners) gave way and in four days, 49 square kilometres (12,000 acres) of fertile ground were under water.
- On June 1, 1948, the Cannor Dyke (east of Vedder Canal near Trans Canada Highway) broke and released tons of Fraser River water onto the Greendale area, destroying homes and fields.
- On June 3, 1948, the steamer Gladys supplied flood-stricken Chilliwack with tents and provisions as well as moving people and stock onto high ground.

==== Causes ====
Cool temperatures in March, April, and early May had delayed the melting of the heavy snowpack that had accumulated over the winter season. Several days of hot weather and warm rains over the holiday weekend in late May hastened the thawing of the snowpack. Rivers and streams quickly swelled with spring runoff, reaching heights surpassed only in 1894. Finally, the poorly maintained dyke systems failed to contain the water.

At the height of the 1948 flood, 200 square kilometres (50,000 acres) stood under water. Dykes broke at Agassiz, Chiliwack, Nicomen Island, Glen Valley and Matsqui. When the flood waters receded a month later, 16,000 people had been evacuated, with damages totaling $20 million, about $225 million in 2020 dollars.

=== 1972 flood ===
Major flooding occurred once again in 1972 due to a significant spring freshet, primarily impacting regions around Prince George, Kamloops, Hope and Surrey.

=== 2007 flood ===
Due to record snowpacks on the mountains in the Fraser River catch basin which began melting, combined with heavy rainfall, water levels on the Fraser River rose in 2007 to a level not reached since 1972. Low-lying land in areas upriver such as Prince George suffered minor flooding. Evacuation alerts were given for the low-lying areas not protected by dikes in the Lower Mainland. However, the water levels did not breach the dikes, and major flooding was averted.

=== 2021 flood ===
Major flooding occurred in November 2021 as part of the November 2021 Pacific Northwest floods.

== Tributaries ==
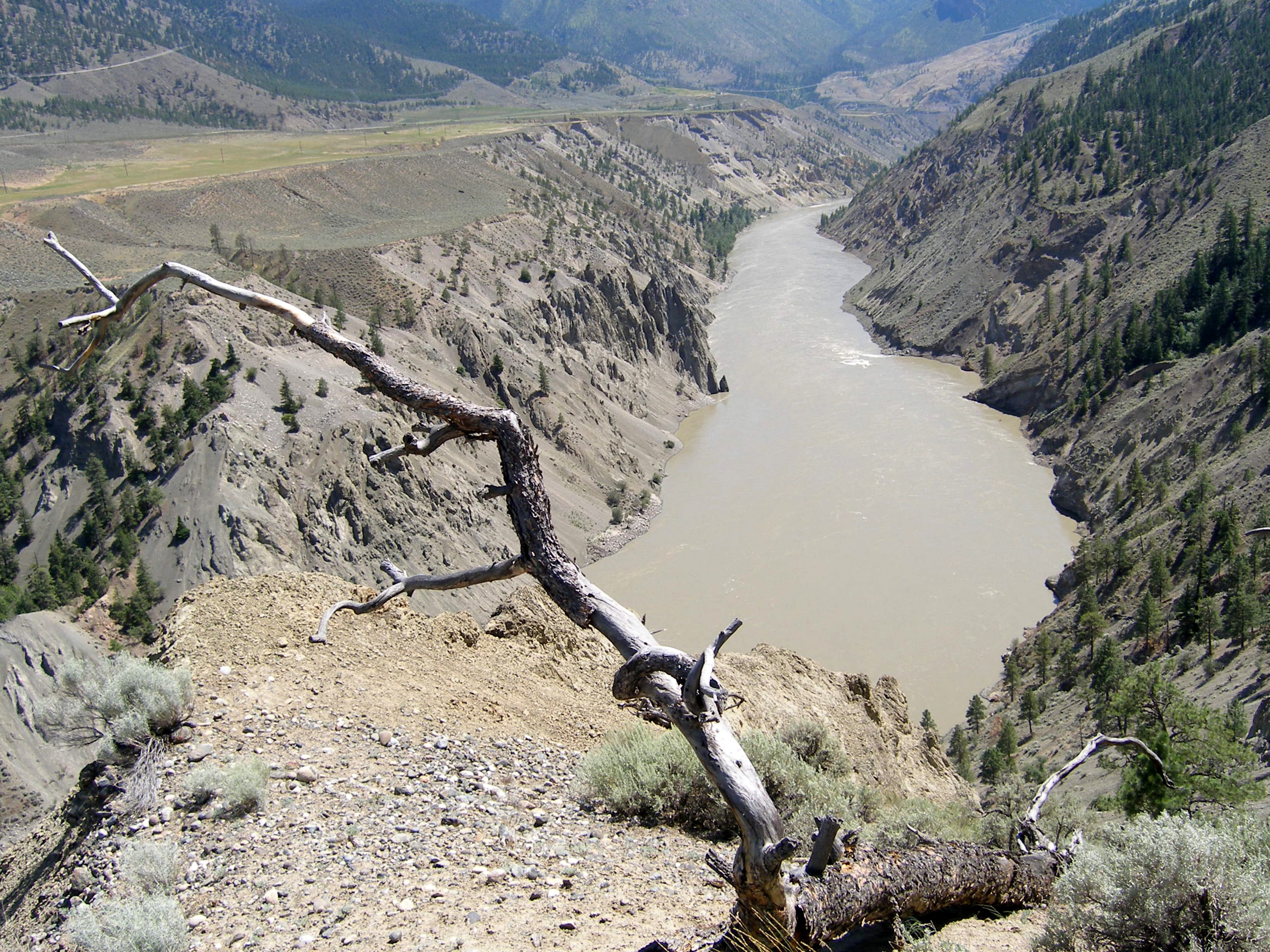
Fraser River in the Glen Fraser area, about 25 kilometres (16 mi) upstream of Lillooet

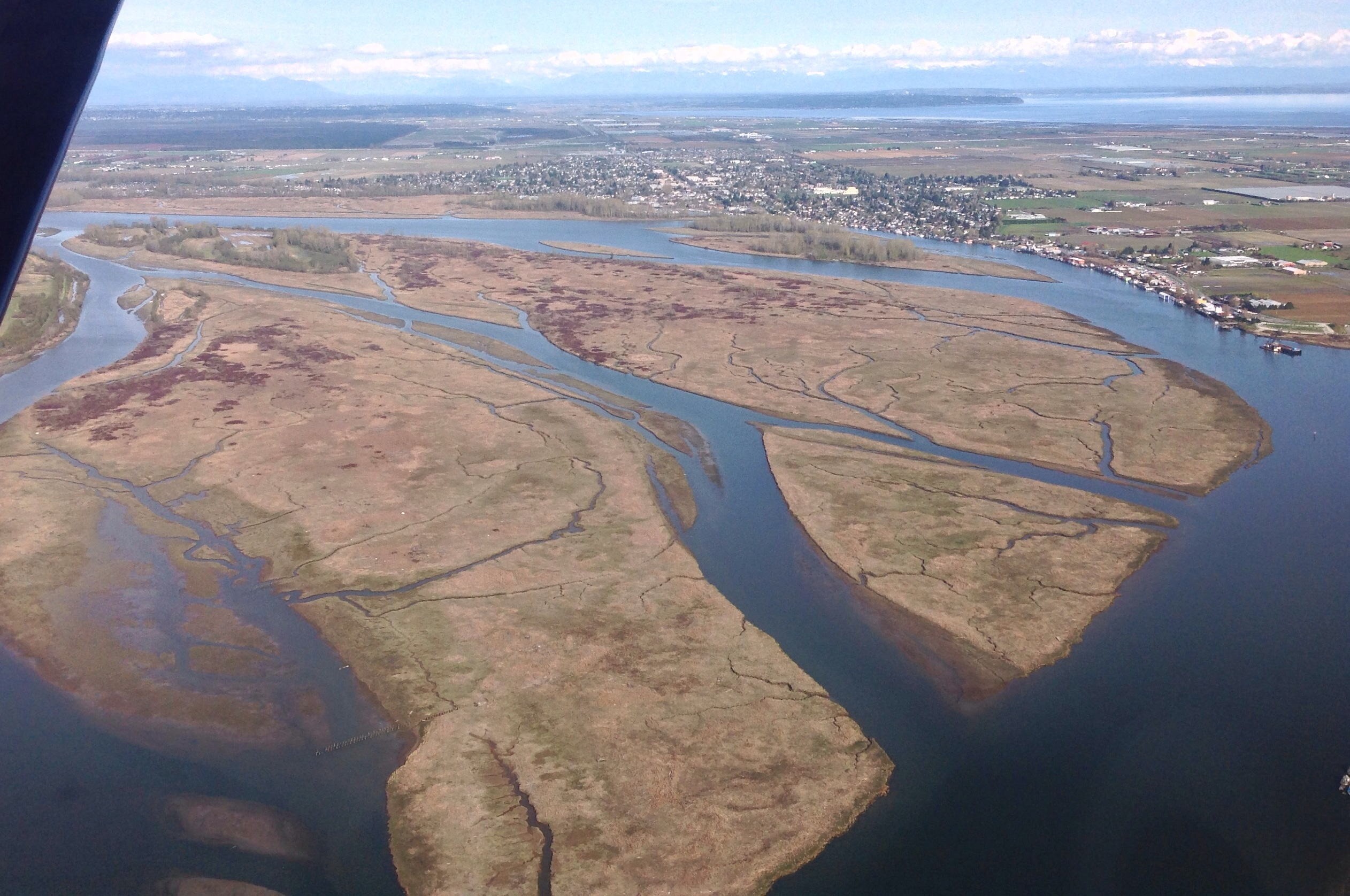
An east-facing aerial view of Ladner beyond Barber Island, Duck Island, Gunn Island and Port Guichon in the Fraser River Estuary

Tributaries are listed from the mouth of the Fraser and going up river.

- Brunette River
- Coquitlam River
- Pitt River
- Stave River
- Kanaka Creek
- D'Herbomez Creek
- Norrish Creek
- Sumas River
- Harrison River
- Ruby Creek
- Coquihalla River
- Emory Creek
- Spuzzum Creek
- Anderson River
- Nahatlatch River
- Thompson River
- Stein River
- Seton River
- Bridge River
- Churn Creek
- Chilcotin River
- Williams Lake River
- Quesnel River
- Cottonwood River
- West Road River (Blackwater River)
- Nechako River
- Salmon River
- Willow River
- McGregor River
- Bowron River
- Torpy River
- Morkill River
- Goat River
- Doré River
- Holmes River
- Castle Creek
- Raush River
- Kiwa Creek
- Tete Creek
- McLennan River
- Swiftcurrent Creek
- Robson River
- Moose River
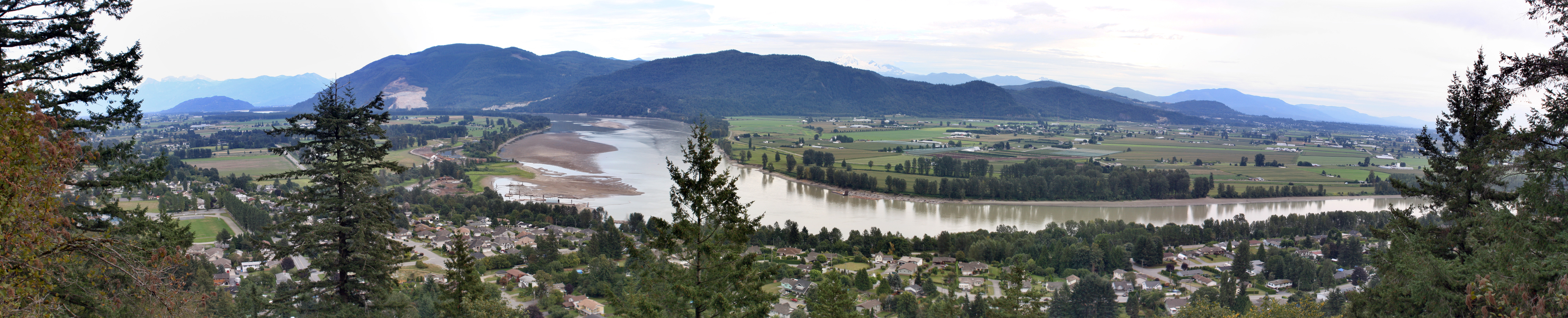
Fraser River as seen from the grounds of Westminster Abbey, above Hatzic in Mission, British Columbia. Sumas Mountain in background.

== See also ==
- List of crossings of the Fraser River
- List of crossings of the Thompson River
- List of crossings of the Nechako River
- List of longest rivers of Canada
- French Bar Canyon
- Fraser Canyon
- List of rivers of British Columbia
- Moran Dam (proposal)
- Vanport Oregon flood May 30, 1948
