= Yellowhead Bridge (Kamloops) =

Canadian bridge

Coordinates: 50.675556°N 120.300278°W

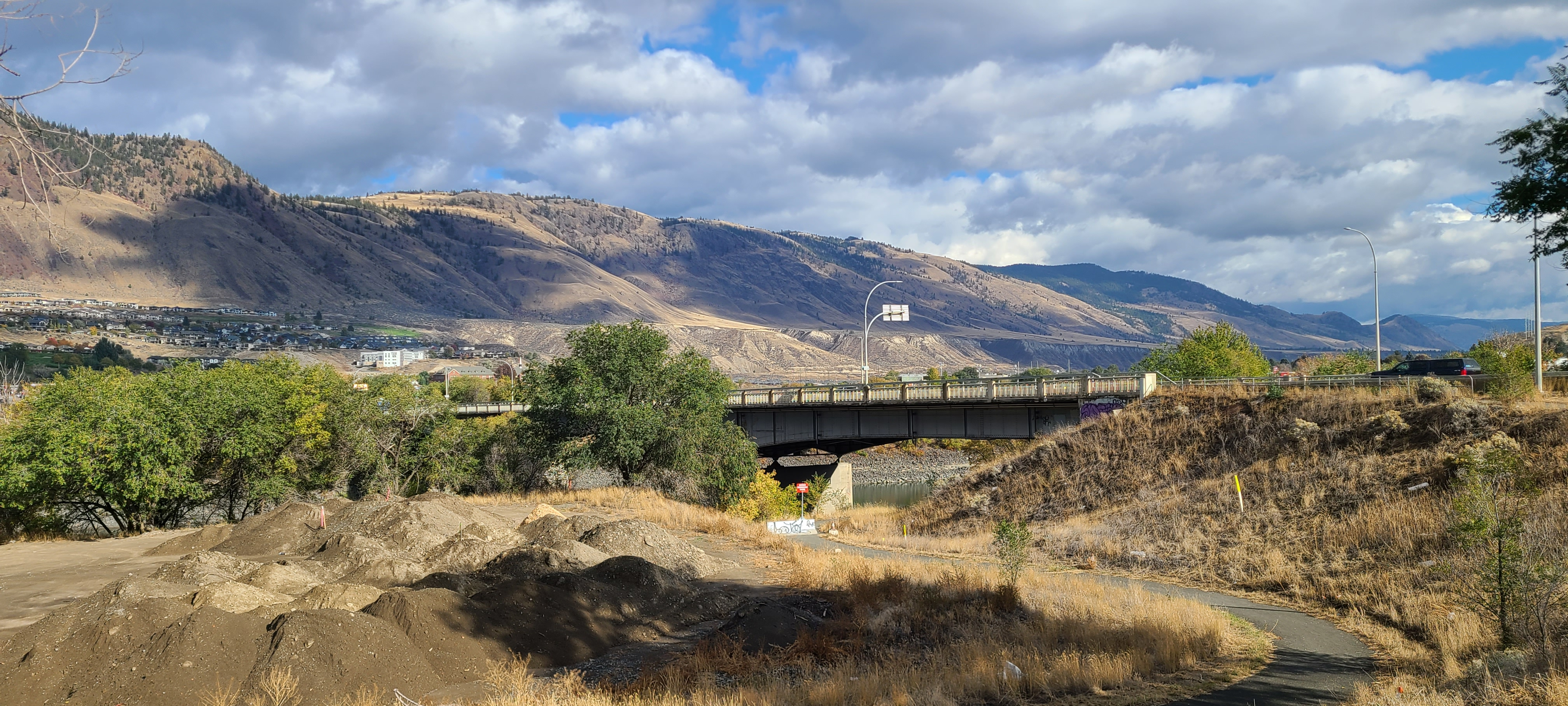
Yellowhead Bridge

The Yellowhead Bridge or the East Kamloops Bridge is a road bridge in Kamloops, British Columbia. It carries Highway 5 over the South Thompson River. It was completed in December of 1968 and has a length of 179.2 metres, not including a preceding railway overhead on the south side of the river.

== See also ==
- List of crossings of the Thompson River
- List of bridges in Canada
