= Great Divide Trail =

Long-distance hiking trail in the Canadian Rockies

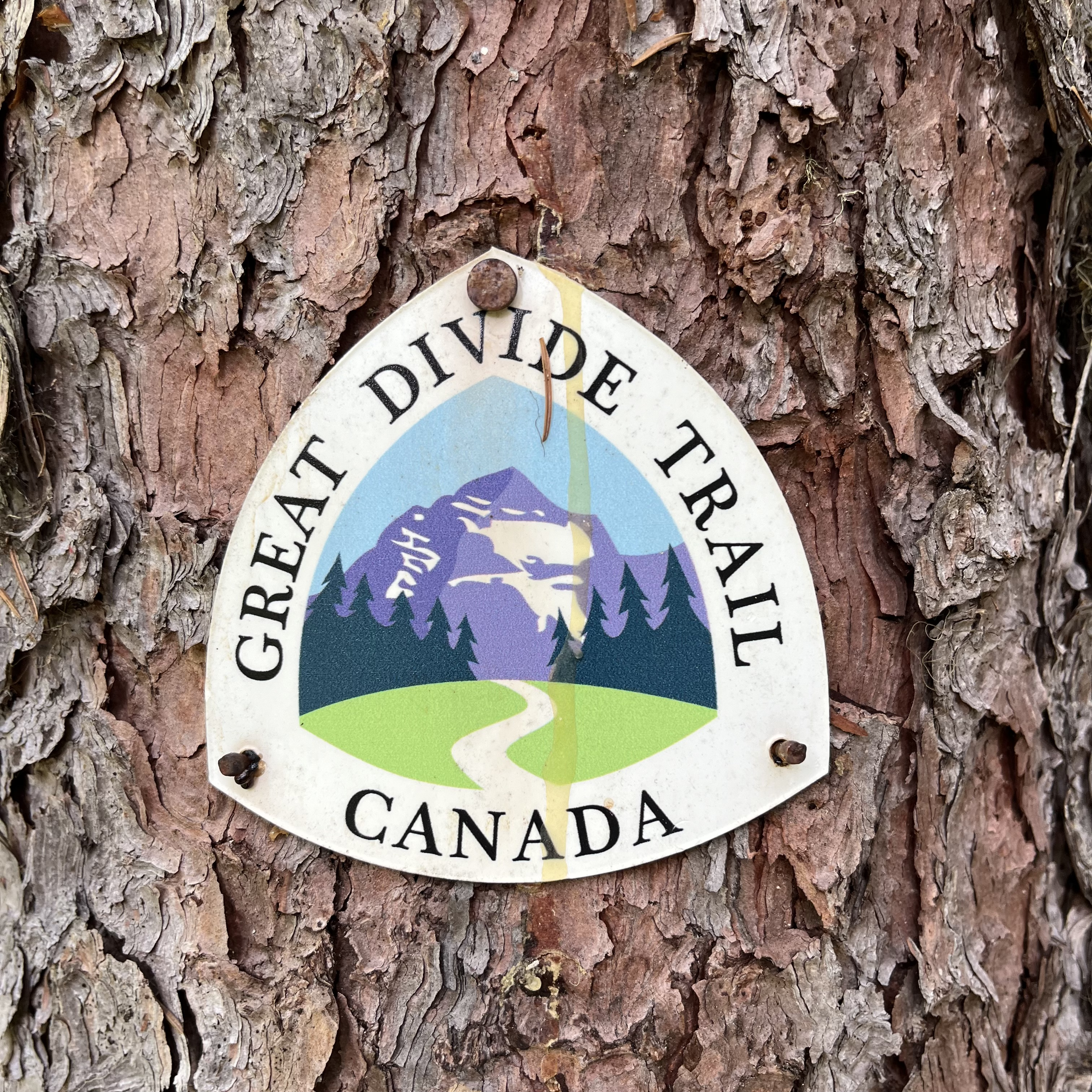
- Length: 1,095 km (680 mi)
- Location: Canadian Rockies, Alberta and British Columbia
- Trailheads: South: Canada-US border at Waterton Lake; North: Kakwa Lake in Kakwa Park
- Use: Hiking; backpacking
- Highest point: Unnamed pass, 2,590 m (8,500 ft)
- Lowest point: Old Fort Point trailhead, 1,055 m (3,461 ft)
- Difficulty: Strenuous
- Months: July–September
- Sights: Canadian Rockies; Waterton Lakes National Park; Banff National Park; Kootenay National Park; Yoho National Park; Jasper National Park; Willmore Wilderness Park; Kakwa Provincial Park and Protected Area
- Hazards: River crossings, water-borne illness, hypothermia, wildlife, avalanches, lightning
- Maintainer: Great Divide Trail Association
- Website: greatdividetrail.com

Trail map
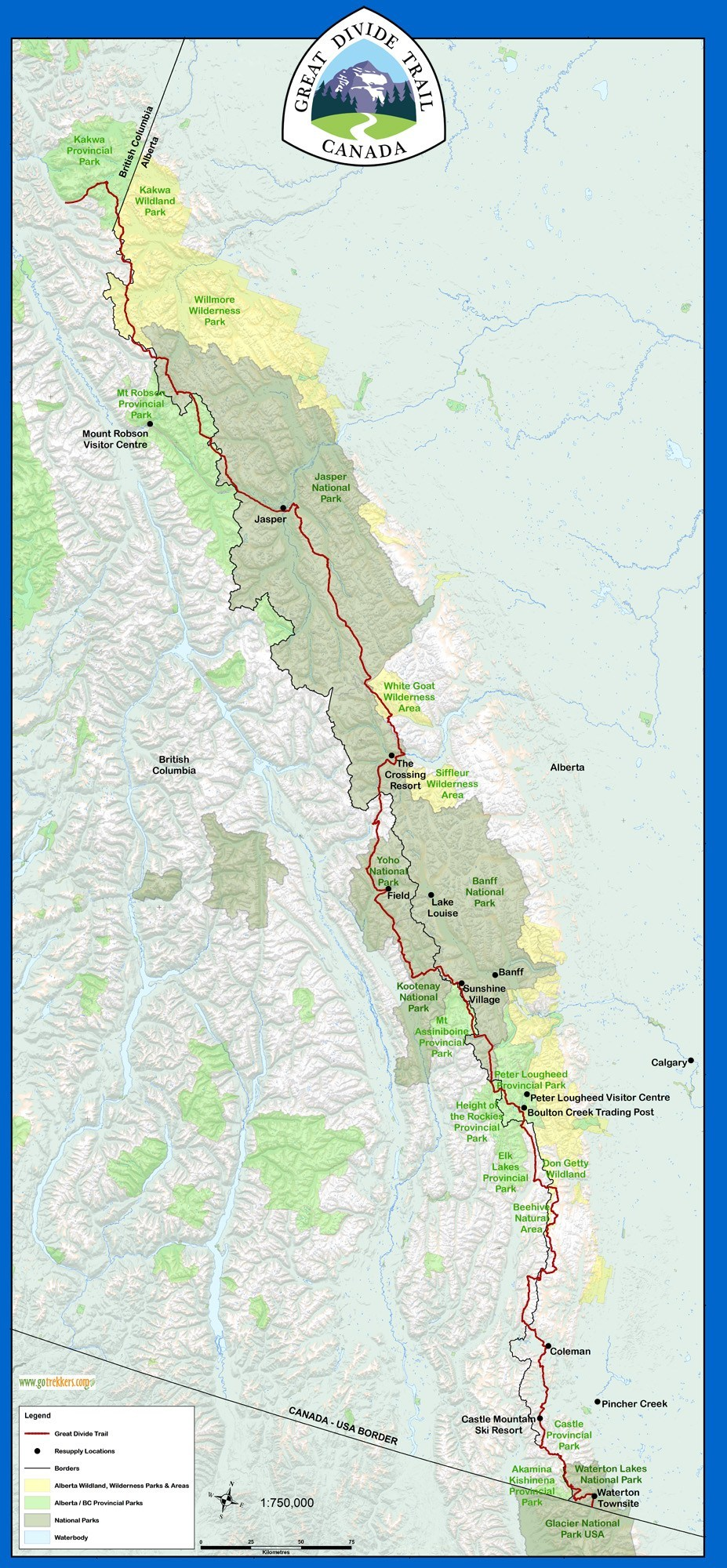

The Great Divide Trail (GDT) is a hiking trail in the Canadian Rockies, made up of several trails connected by roads and wilderness routes. It closely follows the Great Divide between Alberta and British Columbia, crossing it more than 30 times. Its southern terminus is at the Canada–US border (where it connects with the Continental Divide Trail), and its northern terminus is at Kakwa Lake, north of Jasper National Park. The official route travels 1,095 km (680 mi) through the Canadian Rockies, traversing the UNESCO World Heritage Sites of Waterton-Glacier International Peace Park, Canadian Rocky Mountain Parks, and wilderness in between.

GDT hikers will visit popular landmarks such as Mt. Assiniboine and Maligne Lake, as well as less famous areas like the Whitegoat and Willmore wildernesses. In mountain valleys, the trail is most often within dense conifer forest, but climbs frequently into alpine meadows to cross over peaks and passes. The GDT is within core habitat for threatened species such as grizzly bear and caribou. The trail is most often backpacked from early July until early September, when it is nearly free of snow. It generally takes between five and ten weeks, about seven at an average pace. Although popular sections see thousands of hikers each year, fewer than 100 people thru-hike the entire GDT annually.

The idea that kick-started work on the trail goes back to the 1960s, however the project was largely dormant between 1987 and 2005. Since the reactivation of the Great Divide Trail Association in 2013, nearly all of the trail has begun to receive maintenance and portions have been officially recognized.

== History ==
The first record of the Great Divide Trail appears in 1966, when the Girl Guides of Canada proposed the idea of a trail running the length of the BC–Alberta border through the Rocky Mountains. In 1967 and 1968, Jim Thorsell and three other employees of Parks Canada were hired to survey such a route. It received national newspaper coverage and the endorsements of the Alpine Club of Canada and the National and Provincial Parks Association of Canada, a precursor to the Canadian Parks and Wilderness Society, which published in 1970 Thorsell’s pamphlet Provisional Trail Guide and Map for the Proposed Great Divide Trail. Thorsell's route comprised roughly the middle 50% of the modern trail, from Banff's southern boundary at Palliser Pass to Berg Lake. Later that year, Minister of Indian Affairs and Northern Development Jean Chrétien expressed enthusiasm, and Parks Canada approved the project with the objective of completing the GDT in five years.

Outside of the national parks, the route south of Palliser Pass was first mapped in 1974 by six University of Calgary students with support from the Alberta Wilderness Association and the federal Opportunities for Youth Program. Mary Jane Cox, Jenny Feick, Chris Hart, Dave Higgins, Cliff White, and Dave Zevick surveyed an estimated 4,800 km (3,000 mi) of trails, roads, and seismic lines on both sides of the divide. The group founded the Great Divide Trail Association (GDTA) in April 1976 and began trail scouting and flagging that summer. The following year the GDTA became a registered charity and published a strategic plan and policies on trail standards. Despite initially low enthusiasm from Alberta and BC governments representatives, who cited a lack of interest in the trail and a priority on resource development, the Government of Alberta approved trail building permits and grant funding for the group for several years beginning in 1977.

Parks Canada continued to study the idea, but the agency was concerned about overuse and by 1980 had abandoned the idea. The section that was proposed to be built on BC public lands was blocked by the Line Creek coal mine, which began surface mining in 1981. Meanwhile, forestry and off-road vehicle use had destroyed sections of trail on the Alberta side, discouraging volunteers and hikers. By the mid-1980s, crews had built 90 km of trail from North Fork Pass to Fording River Pass. When funding from the province of Alberta ended in 1987, work ceased, and the GDTA disbanded. Corporations Canada declared the association inactive in 1988 and it lost its charitable status in 1990.

In 2000, Dustin Lynx revived interest in the GDT by releasing his guidebook Hiking Canada's Great Divide Trail. By 2004, new hikers and original members of the GDTA formed the Friends of the Great Divide Trail group and began to work on the GDT. Once again, they focused on the unprotected Crown lands between Crowsnest Pass and Banff National Park. In order to more easily get trail building permits from the province, the Friends of the Great Divide Trail re-activated the GDTA in 2013 as a nonprofit corporation headquartered in Calgary.

Since then, the association has conducted annual maintenance and trail-building throughout the length of the GDT. The new owners of the Line Creek mine, Teck Coal, out of safety and liability concerns from hikers entering their lease, had been escorting GDT hikers to the highway. In 2016, Teck donated $12,500 to the GDTA to help build a re-route on the Alberta side. This section would become the Highrock Trail in Section B, officially opened in July 2022.

Another major focus of the GDTA has been partnerships with the provincial and federal governments. The GDTA and the Jasper Trails Alliance have, for several years, done trail maintenance on the previously-decommissioned section of the GDT in the Maligne Valley. This is a rare example of an external group being allowed to build trail in a National Park. In 2022–2023, the GDTA entered into agreements with the BC government on trail management and resupply, including maintenance in Height of the Rockies Provincial Park in Section C, and a sign at the northern terminus of the trail at Kakwa Lake. Also in 2023, the Great Divide Trail was officially designated on Alberta Public Lands. The following year, the GDTA became its official trail manager under the Alberta Trails Act. As of October 2026, the GDTA reported that it had 893 active members.

== Route ==
While portions of the GDT are recognized and supported by the province of Alberta, the GDTA continues to work towards a formal designation, including by Parks Canada, for the long-term protection of the trail. According to the GDTA:

The GDT is officially signed in portions of Sections A, B, D, and G, but elsewhere the GDT is not officially signed. Much of the trail within national and provincial parks is well marked but not identified as the GDT. The route is actually made up of several separate trail systems joined together by ATV tracks, roads, and wilderness routes. The GDT varies from being a well-developed, signed trail to an unmarked, cross-country wilderness route where navigation skills are required.

Since the trail follows the Canadian Rocky Mountains, it runs generally northwest–southeast, with the northern terminus being 555 kilometres (345 mi) further north—equivalent to 5° of latitude—and 511 kilometres (318 mi) west of the southern terminus. The GDT passes through five national parks, nine provincial parks, four wilderness areas, and four forest districts. The trail is commonly broken up into seven sections, A–G, based on access and resupply.

=== Section A ===
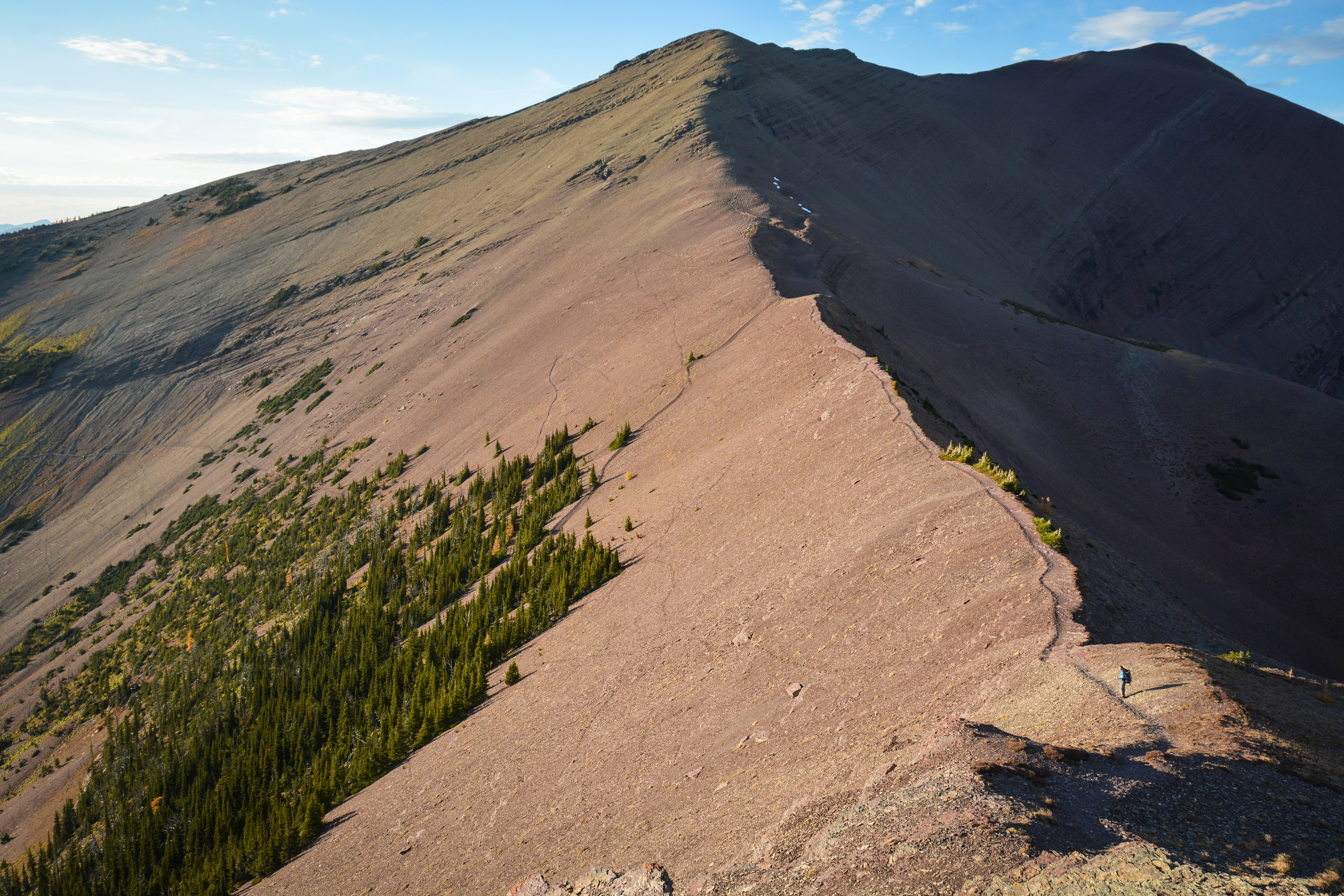
Carthew-Alderson Trail, part of the Great Divide Trail, in Waterton Lakes National Park.

Section A runs approximately 145 kilometres (90 mi) from the GDT's southern terminus at the Canada–United States border (which is also the northern terminus of the Continental Divide Trail) to the hamlet of Coleman, near Crowsnest Pass.

The southern 55 kilometres (34 mi) travel through Waterton Lakes National Park, where much of the area below the treeline burned in the 2017 Kenow Wildfire. This part of the trail visits several notable places, including the Waterton Townsite, Carthew Summit, and the second highest point on the GDT: Lineham Ridge, at 2,520 metres (8,270 ft).

The rest of the section is mostly in either Castle Wildland Provincial Park or Castle Provincial Park. The trail crosses or straddles the divide frequently, until it descends from La Coulotte Ridge. The northern 70 kilometres (43 mi) take a mix of multi-use trails and roads east of the divide.

Alternate routes in Section A include Mt. Rowe-Sage Pass and Barnaby Ridge. Both feature long ridge walks, the latter with short sections classed as scrambling.

=== Section B ===
This 195 kilometres (121 mi) section connects Crowsnest Pass in the south to Kananaskis in the north. Nearly all of it is in public lands, with no designated campgrounds and no specific permits required.

The section has undergone extensive route improvements since 2013, particularly the 50 kilometres (31 mi) High Rock Trail near the south end. The trail was built to keep the route just east of the divide, avoiding private land, including the Line Creek Mine, on the British Columbia side. It passes features such as Window Mountain Lake and Domke Ridge.

The High Rock Trail reconnects with the original GDT, built in the 1970s and 1980s, near where it re-entered Alberta at North Fork Pass. During the next 86 kilometres (53 mi) north of this junction, the route passes points of interest including Tornado Saddle and the Beehive Natural Area.

North of Fording River Pass, the trail crosses into British Columbia and soon begins the longest road walk on the GDT, at nearly 30 kilometres (19 mi); this can be largely avoided by taking the Coral Pass alternate route. The north end of the road reaches Elk Lakes Provincial Park and, after crossing West Elk Pass, ends the section at Upper and Lower Kananaskis Lakes in Peter Lougheed Provincial Park.

=== Section C ===
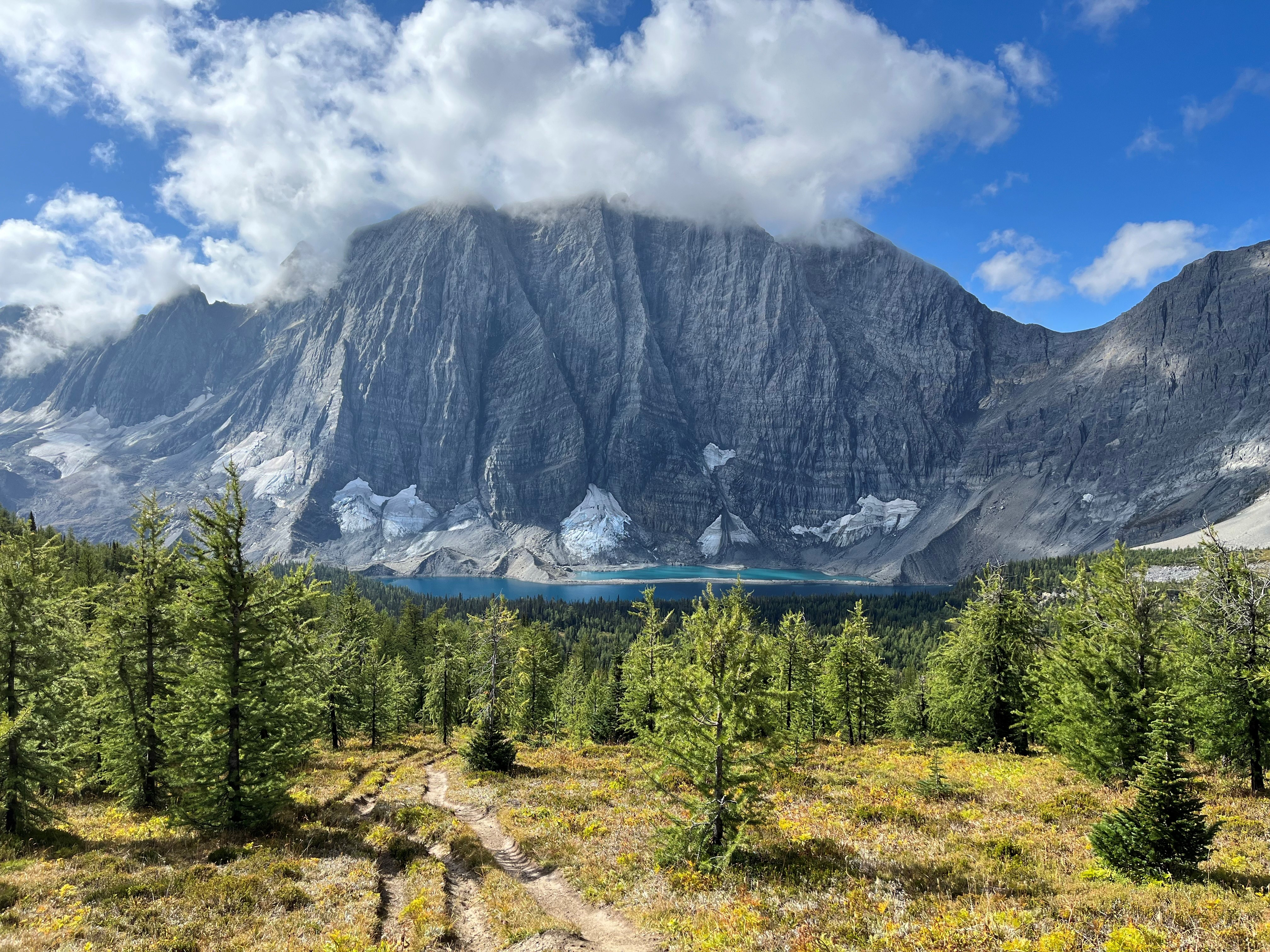
Floe Lake, Kootenay National Park, British Columbia.

In contrast to section B, the 207 kilometres (129 mi) section C is entirely within provincial and national parks, requiring camping permits nearly every night. Because the GDT in this section uses some of the most popular hiking trails in Canada, it can be competitive to obtain certain campsites.

In the south, the section starts at Kananaskis Lakes, before climbing over the divide into Height of the Rockies Provincial Park. This, the only area that does not require permits, ends in less than 10 kilometres (6.2 mi) at the Banff National Park boundary at Palliser Pass. Passing Marvel Lake, the route enters Mount Assiniboine Provincial Park at Wonder Pass, visiting Mount Assiniboine and Lake Magog before returning to Banff at Sunshine Meadows.

Over the next 30 kilometres (19 mi), the trail passes through the Egypt Lakes area until it leaves Banff and enters Kootenay National Park at Ball Pass to begin the Rockwall. After crossing Goodsir Pass and descending to the Trans-Canada Highway, section C ends in the hamlet of Field, BC. Notable alternates in this section are the Northover Ridge and South Kananaskis Pass routes.

=== Section D ===
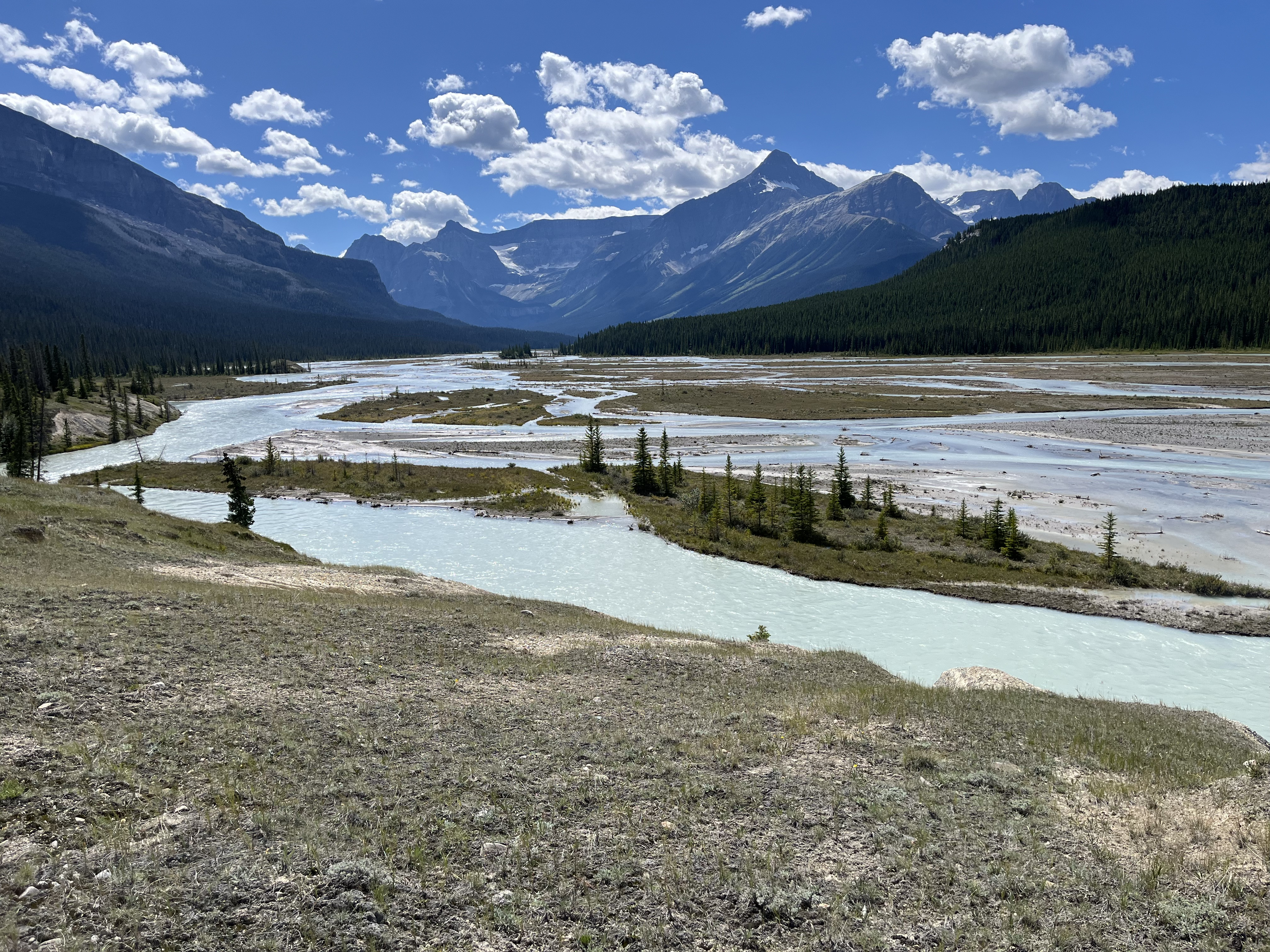
The Howse River valley in Banff National Park

This is the southernmost section of the GDT with substantial stretches of unmaintained trail. The GDTA describes Section D, at 106 kilometres (66 mi), as the shortest section. Although Section F is about 100 kilometres (62 mi), its northern end is 26 kilometres (16 mi) from a trailhead, so completing it requires a greater hiking distance.

From Field, the main route takes an overgrown road up the Amiskwi River to Amiskwi Pass and requires the first significant unbridged river crossings that a northbound hiker is likely to encounter. The popular 33 kilometres (21 mi) Kiwetinok Alternate also goes north from Field. It uses maintained trail to Burgess Pass, the Iceline Trail, and Kiwetinok Pass. An off-trail route then reconnects with the main trail at the Amiskwi River about 31 kilometres (19 mi) into the section.

From Amiskwi Pass, the main route leaves Yoho National Park and follows a gravel road down to the Blaeberry River. North of the pass, hikers use the David Thompson Heritage Trail to reach Howse Pass, where they re-enter Banff National Park. Since 2019, the GDTA has been active in maintaining the stretch of trail between those National Parks by clearing the David Thompson Heritage Trail and the Collie Creek Trail, establishing campgrounds, building bridges, and installing a cable car over the Blaeberry.

The northern 30 kilometres (19 mi) follow the Howse River out to the Icefield Parkway and Saskatchewan River Crossing.

=== Section E ===
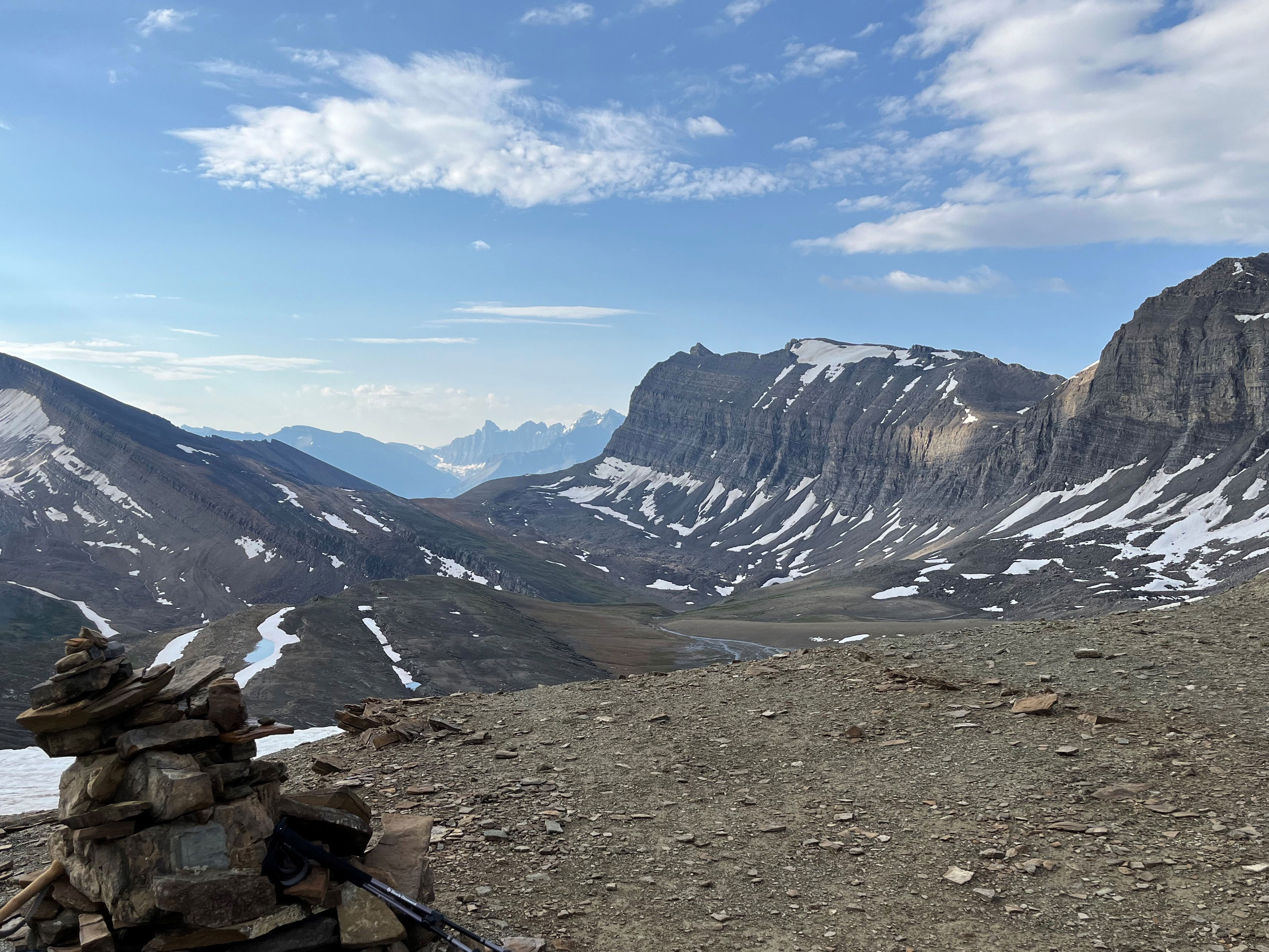
A view from the highpoint of the GDT, an unnamed pass in the Job/Cline PLUZ, looking south towards Owen Pass.

This 190 kilometres (120 mi) section between Saskatchewan Crossing and the town of Jasper has a mix of high-popularity recreation areas and remote wilderness. Section E is the only section that never crosses the Pacific-Atlantic hydrologic divide, remaining well east in Alberta. However, it does cross from the Atlantic to the Arctic drainage basin at Jonas Pass. To the south, Four-point Creek flows into the Brazeau River and then into the North Saskatchewan. To the north, Jonas Creek joins the Athabasca. Section E contains both the highest (2,590 metres (8,500 ft)) and lowest (1,055 metres (3,461 ft)) points on the GDT.

Northbound hikers leave Highway 11 at the Owen Creek trailhead and, once over Owen Pass, exit Banff National Park for the third and final time. For the next 34 kilometres (21 mi), the route uses unsigned but maintained trail in the Job/Cline Public Land Use Zone, and unmaintained trail in the White Goat Wilderness Area. Permits for specific campsites are not required. Highlights in this area include Michelle Lakes, the highpoint of the GDT at an unnamed pass, and Pinto Lake.

At Cataract Pass, the route crosses into Jasper National Park and uses the Brazeau and Poboktan trail network, crossing Jonas Shoulder and Maligne Pass. North of the pass, the 30 kilometres (19 mi) trail down the Maligne Valley to Maligne Lake had been unmaintained by Parks Canada for about a decade, leading to rougher hiking and camping conditions. In 2022, Parks Canada began once more to include the trail on official maps, renovate campgrounds, and allow the Friends of Jasper National Park and the GDTA to clear deadfall and overgrowth on the trail. This has improved trail conditions, although there are still unbridged water crossings.

At the north end of Maligne Lake, the GDT uses the popular 44 kilometres (27 mi) Skyline Trail and a short stretch of day-use trails or roads to reach the Athabasca River and Jasper.

=== Section F ===
Moose Pass, between Jasper National Park and Mount Robson Provincial Park, facing Mount Calumet.

The southern end of this 100 kilometres (62 mi) section is the townsite of Jasper, but unlike most other sections, the northern end is not near a trailhead but rather at the junction between the North Boundary Trail and Robson Pass Trail to Berg Lake, the original northern terminus of the GDT. Section F uses trails that weave along the boundary of Jasper National Park and Mount Robson Provincial Park.

Northbound, the section starts with approximately 20 kilometres (12 mi) along Highway 16 to Yellowhead Pass, returning to the divide for the first time since Howse Pass, some 270 kilometres (170 mi) to the south. After turning northwest up the Miette River, the trail criss-crosses the divide at a series of passes below the treeline—Centre Miette (1,980 metres (6,500 ft)), Grant (2,131 metres (6,991 ft)), and Colonel (1,849 metres (6,066 ft))—to get to the Moose River valley. Although Jasper National Park classifies this area as a wildland, equestrian users continue to maintain the trail and campgrounds in both the Jasper and Mount Robson parks, and the GDTA helps clear the Robson side.

If hikers are able to make a challenging ford of the Moose River, they can return to Highway 16 using an access route down the west side. While the GDT initially stays on the east bank, it must still ford the Moose River and some of its major tributaries several times on the way up to Moose Pass. Once over the pass, the trail drops down to the Smoky River, a powerful waterway that also must be forded, whether hikers are continuing on Section G or hiking back to Highway 16 through Robson Pass and the Berg Lake Trail.

=== Section G ===
The most northerly and remote section of the GDT, Section G includes infrequently maintained trails, many challenging river crossings, and navigation without defined trail. It also offers lengthy alpine travel, close-up glacier views, and a deep wilderness experience, leading several hikers to refer to it as the heart, or the epitome, of the GDT. Section G is 154 kilometres (96 mi) long, but this does not include getting to and from the section, neither end of which is near a vehicle-accessible trailhead.

From the northern end of Section F, the route continues northwest on the North Boundary Trail, classified as low-priority for maintenance by Jasper National Park. Although horse parties occasionally clear deadfall from the trail, washed-out bridges have not been replaced, necessitating significant fords of Gendarme, Carcajou, and Chown Creeks.

Crossing Bess Pass leaves the Smoky River watershed and Jasper National Park for Jackpine Pass and Blueberry Lake. The Blueberry Creek access trail drops steeply down from Blueberry Lake to the Holmes River FSR, where the GDTA and Robson Backcountry Adventures operate a resupply service. Hikers not needing to resupply cross into the Willmore Wilderness Park and the Jackpine River valley.

The main route descends to follow the river downstream, while the Perseverance and Loren Lake High Routes remain largely above treeline and rejoin after approximately 44 kilometres (27 mi). Shortly after this junction, the GDT leaves the Jackpine to ascend Big Shale Hill and follow the divide through passes below Mount Talbot, Mount Forget, Mount Morkill, Mount Fetherstonhaugh, and Casket Mountain. A junction with the 66 kilometres (41 mi) Sheep Creek trail to Grande Cache, Alberta provides an alternate route to pavement.

Near Surprise Pass, the trail leaves the Willmore and enters Kakwa Park in BC. The main route descends to Cecilia Lake; the Surprise Pass alternate remains in the alpine and rejoins near Providence Pass, where another alternate branches off shortly. Kakwa Pass is the final pass for northbound hikers. The trail descends to Kakwa Lake, which has a free, first-come first-served public cabin maintained by volunteer hosts.

From Kakwa Lake, there are two options for exiting the GDT by ground. The most common choice starts with a 30 kilometres (19 mi) hike to the nearest vehicle-accessible road at Bastille Creek, and another 76 kilometres (47 mi) on the Walker Forest Service Road to reach pavement at Highway 16. Alternatively, hikers can take a mix of trails 48 kilometres (30 mi) east to the Lick Creek trailhead in Alberta.

=== Great Divide Route ===
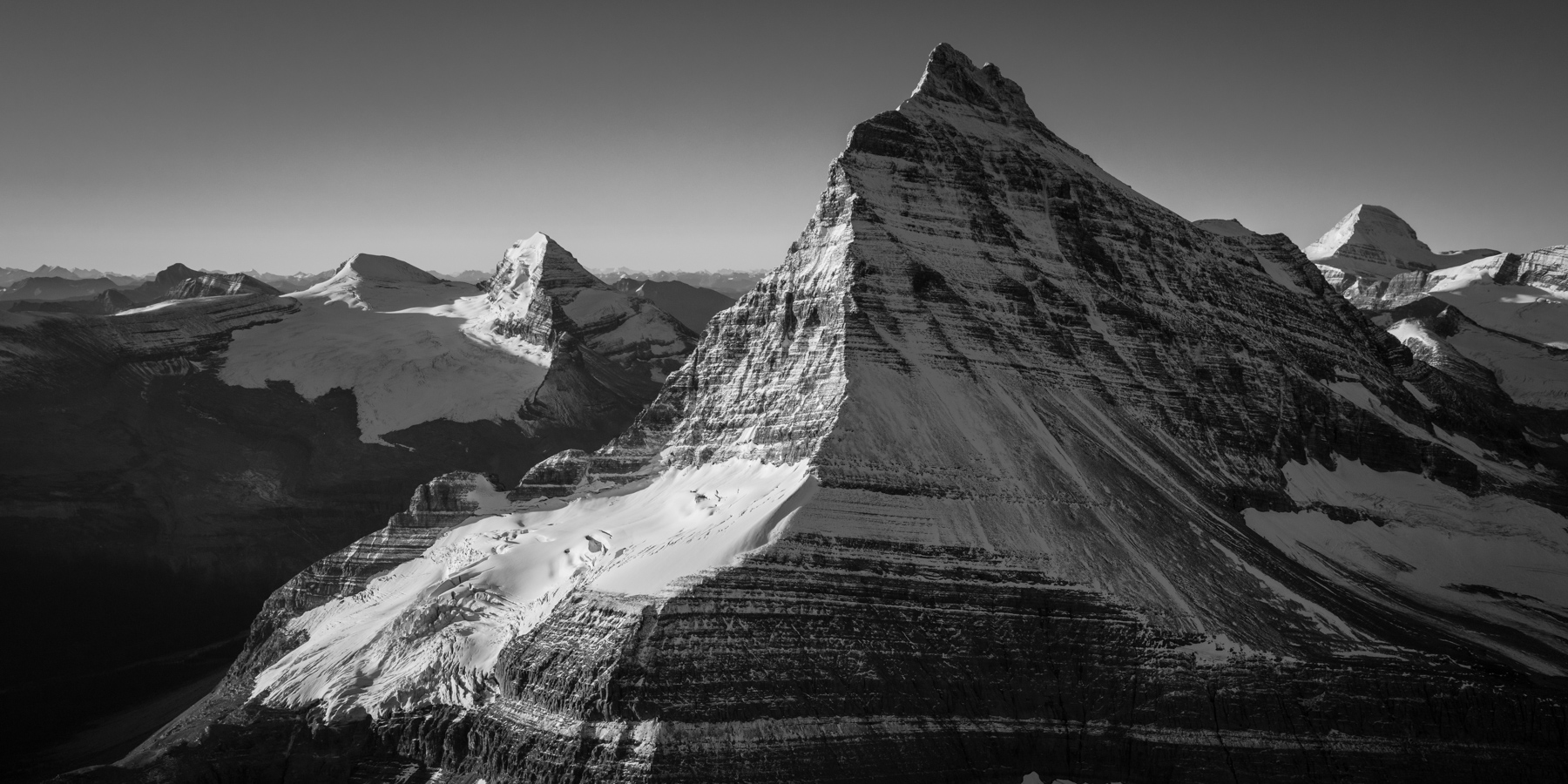
Mount Ida, near the southern end of the Great Divide Route, above Jarvis Creek.

The continental divide continues to follow the spine of the Rocky Mountains beyond the northern terminus of the GDT to Monkman Provincial Park. The Great Divide Route is an unofficial extension of the GDT for hikers wishing to reach the geological point where the divide leaves the Rockies. The GDTA is studying whether to make this route an official part of the GDT. Aside from short sections at the start and end, there are no trails, bridges, or campgrounds, and therefore many possible routes. The GDTA suggests that it is more than 200 kilometres (120 mi), has an undefined amount of elevation gain, and takes one to two weeks. It is much more difficult than any section of the GDT.

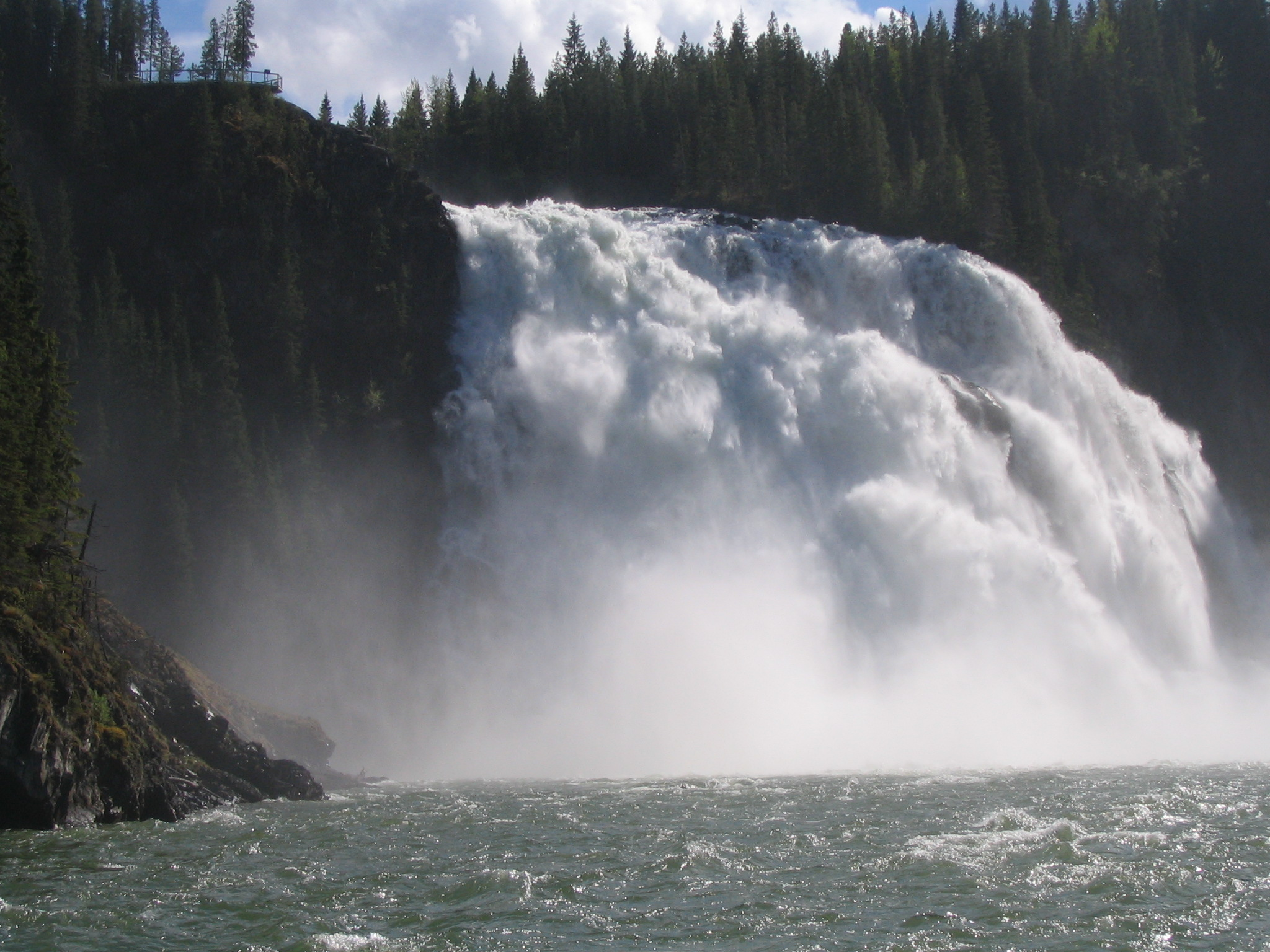
Kinuseo Falls, near the northern end of the Great Divide Route, in Monkman Provincial Park.

The management plans approved by BC Parks seek to limit development in areas where the route passes through provincial parks. The 2006 Kakwa Provincial Park and Protected Area management plan allows maintenance of the GDT and the southernmost stretch of the Great Divide Route from Kakwa Lake to Jarvis Lake. However, all areas beyond that are to be maintained "as an undeveloped wild area, with an emphasis on preserving undisturbed wildlife habitat." The 1994 Monkman Provincial Park Master Plan, covering the northern portion of the route, allows for a 12 kilometres (7.5 mi) trail from the access road to Monkman Lake. The rest of the route is zoned as a Wilderness Conservation Zone, where backcountry use is minimized and not encouraged. To protect grizzly bears and sensitive fish populations, no recreational facilities, including the construction of rock cairns, is allowed. Between Kakwa and Monkman parks, the route roughly follows the border between the Peace River Regional District and the Regional District of Fraser–Fort George, managed by Recreation Sites and Trails BC. There are no trails or facilities near the Great Divide Route, and authorization would be required to build or maintain any.

== Travelling the trail ==
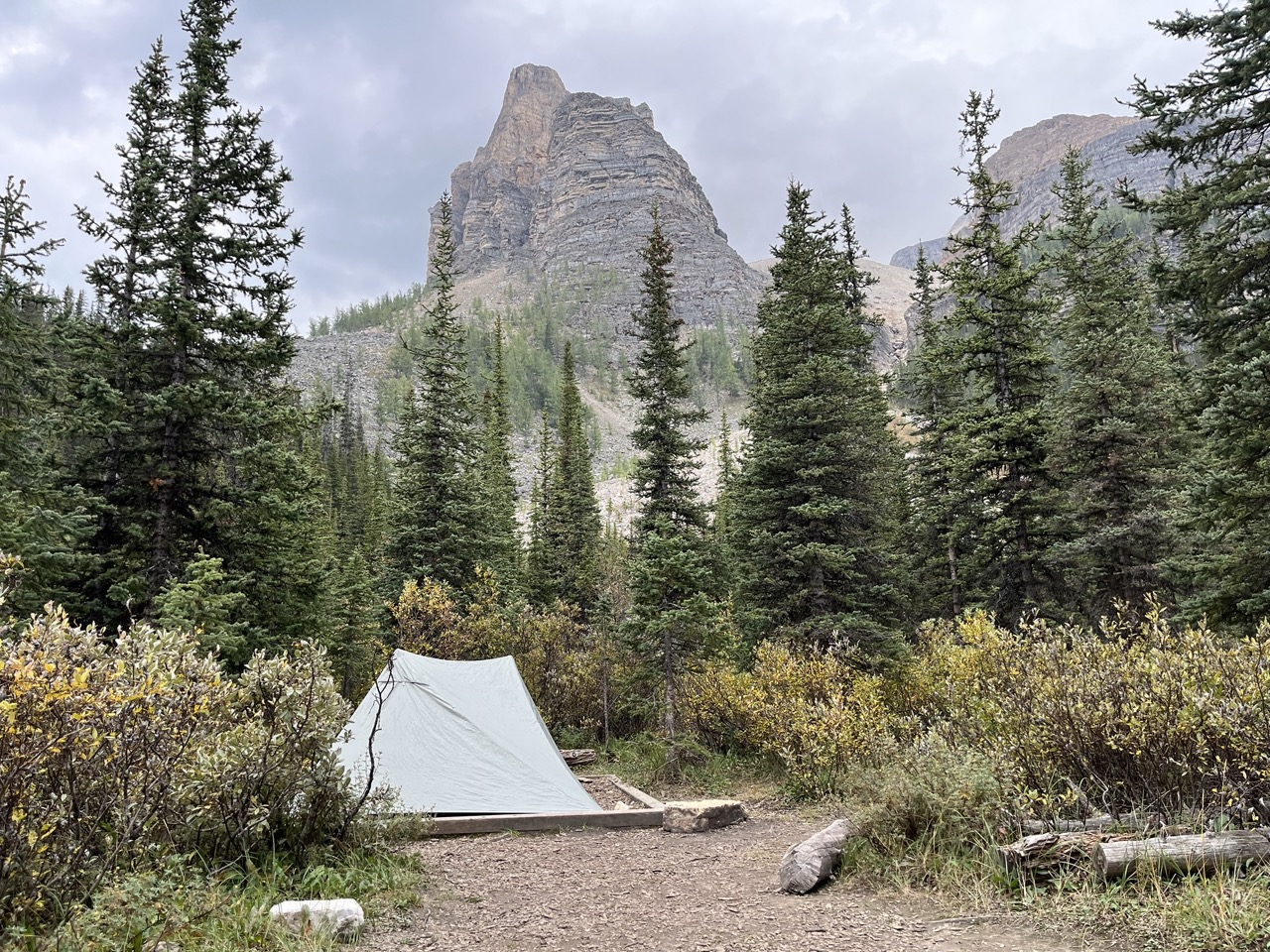
Ball Pass Junction Campground in Banff National Park in Section C.

The trail may be hiked in many short sections as day hikes or backpacking trips, or thru-hiked in a single season. A typical time to thru-hike the entire trail between the Canada-US border and Kakwa Lake is about seven weeks from early July until late August. Before July, lingering snow and swollen rivers substantially increase hazards, and by September, there is an increasing likelihood of snow and freezing temperatures.

Backcountry camping makes up most nights for thru-hikers of the GDT. There are also a handful of backcountry lodges and ACC huts near the trail. For the majority of the trail, hikers must stay in designated campsites, with a valid permit.

=== Resupply ===
In general, thru-hikers can resupply at the transitions between sections A through G, which range in length from about 100 kilometres (62 mi) to 200 kilometres (120 mi). Some resupply points are towns with full services, while others are just locations near the trail where food can be safely cached ahead of time. Some possible resupply locations, such as Banff and Golden, are further off-route.

=== Hazards ===
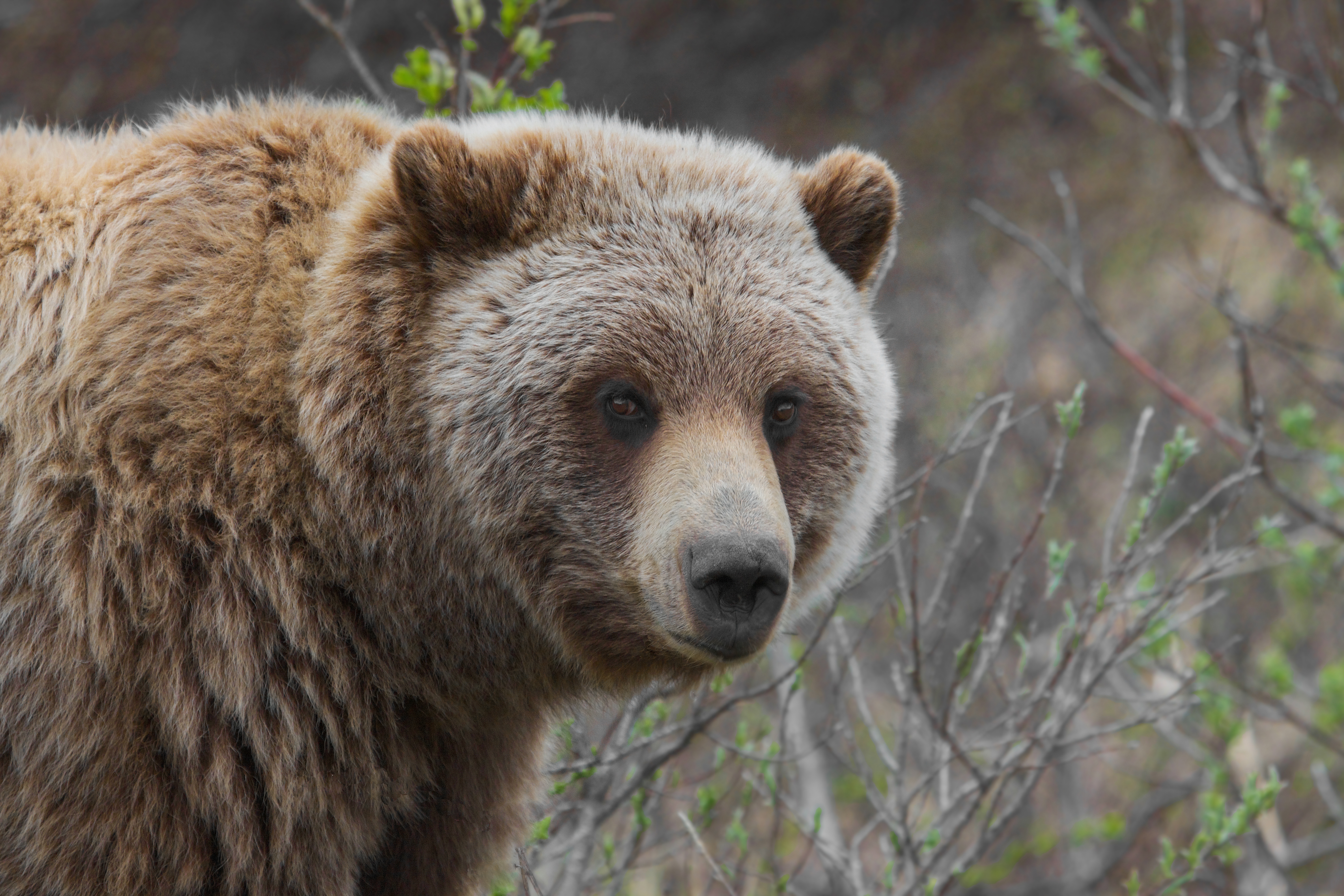
Bear-safe practices are necessary on the Great Divide Trail, as it is entirely within grizzly habitat.

The vast majority of the trail is outside cell reception, so contacting emergency services requires a satellite communicator. Beyond the common risks of recreating outdoors, the GDT is notable for being entirely in core grizzly bear habitat. Although bear attacks are very rare, these and animals such as black bears, cougars, moose, and elk can be dangerous. Hikers can reduce this risk by safely storing their food, carrying bear spray, being alert, and making noise while hiking.

The Great Divide Trail has many unbridged river crossings that can be hazardous when water levels are high. This typically occurs after rain events, in early summer from snowmelt above the trail and late on warm days due to high glacial melt. GDT hikers will have to navigate many types of watercourses, such as large braided rivers and fast-flowing cobble streams. Because rivers on the GDT are glacially fed, glacial silt can obscure the stream bed except in still, shallow areas.

Hikers attempting the GDT early in the season may encounter significant lingering snowpack in certain areas such as the leeward and north-facing slopes near high passes. The terrain can cause cornices to form and pose high avalanche hazard. Travel in deep snow without equipment such as snowshoes is also slow and exhausting.

The highly variable mountain weather can be dangerous for unprepared hikers. Snow, especially at higher elevations, is possible even in the summer, and prolonged periods of cool, wet weather increase the chances of hypothermia. During heat waves, temperatures on the trail have reached at least 39 °C (102 °F), which can contribute to heat exhaustion or heat stroke. Given the exposed position of many parts along the GDT, thunderstorms are also a hazard. Hikers should watch for signs of thunderheads before committing to long stretches above the treeline.

=== Notable thru-hikes ===
In 1988, Chris Townsend hiked the entire length of the Canadian Rockies, including the original GDT route proposed by Jim Thorsell, and visited what would become the northern terminus at Kakwa Lake. He wrote about it in his 1989 book High Summer.

Dustin Lynx's 1996 hike of the GDT is credited with reviving interest in the trail when, in 2000, he published his research in the guidebook Hiking the Great Divide Trail.

Andrew Cotterell set the fastest known time for a supported thru-hike of the GDT at just over 20 days in July 2021.

Ellaine Bissonho holds the fastest known time for a "yo-yo" (hiking the trail in one direction, then reversing it) of the GDT at 52 days, in 2019.

A small number of people have successfully linked the Continental Divide Trail and the Great Divide Trail in one continuous thru hike, including Andrew "Peanut" Glenn in 2019 and Jessica "Stitches" Guo in 2025.

=== Non-hiking ===
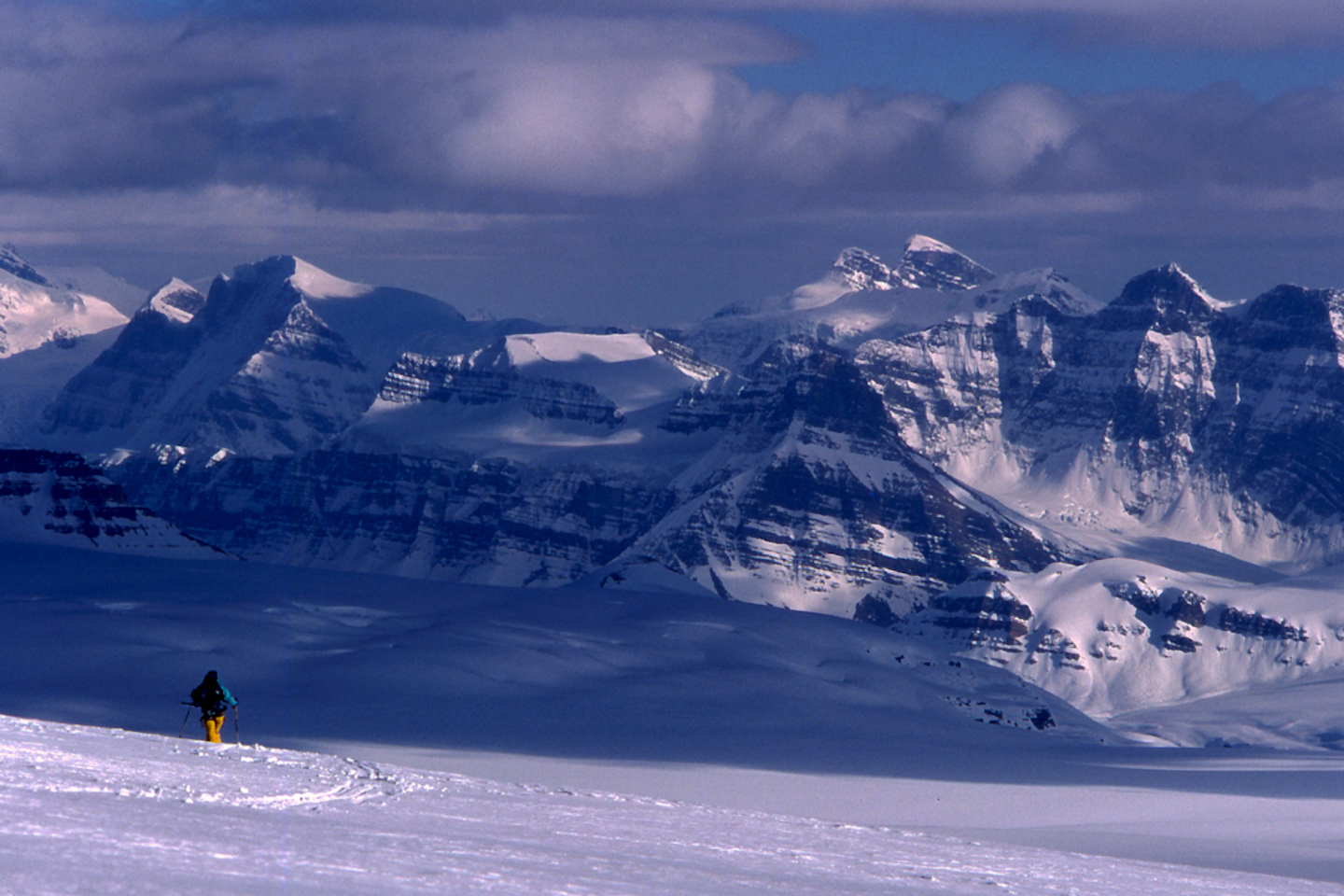
Skiers can stay much closer to the continental divide through the Columbia Icefield.

Although primarily a hiking route, many portions of the GDT are accessible to equestrians where not precluded by unsuitable terrain or regulations. The Great Divide Trail Association is working on alternate routes for horse travel. The Great Divide Traverse is a ski route between Jasper and Lake Louise and has been extended further south. The ski traverse stays much closer to the divide than the hiking trail, which avoids the technical glacier travel required around the ice fields.

== Geology ==
The Great Divide Trail is entirely within the Continental Ranges of the Canadian Rocky Mountains and traverses all but their southernmost extent, which stretches well into Montana. These ranges are bounded on the east by the Interior Plains and on the west by the Rocky Mountain Trench. North of Jarvis Creek, just 10 kilometres (6.2 mi) beyond the GDT's northern terminus, the Continental Ranges end and the Hart Ranges begin.

The GDT passes through mountains that are largely composed of sedimentary rock. Limestone, shale, and quartzite are very common along the trail and date from the late Neoproterozoic to the Cretaceous, far younger than the granite and gneiss commonly found in the American Rockies. The exception is in Waterton Lakes National Park, which has some of the oldest rock in the Canadian Rockies, from the Purcell Supergroup.

The Canadian Rockies did not experience additional volcanic uplift, and so the GDT travels through generally lower-elevation valleys and passes than the CDT in the American Rockies. However, the deeper valleys and steep mountain walls caused by heavy glaciation give the Canadian Rockies, particularly the large mountains along the divide, comparable or even greater prominence than the highest American peaks.

=== Points of interest ===
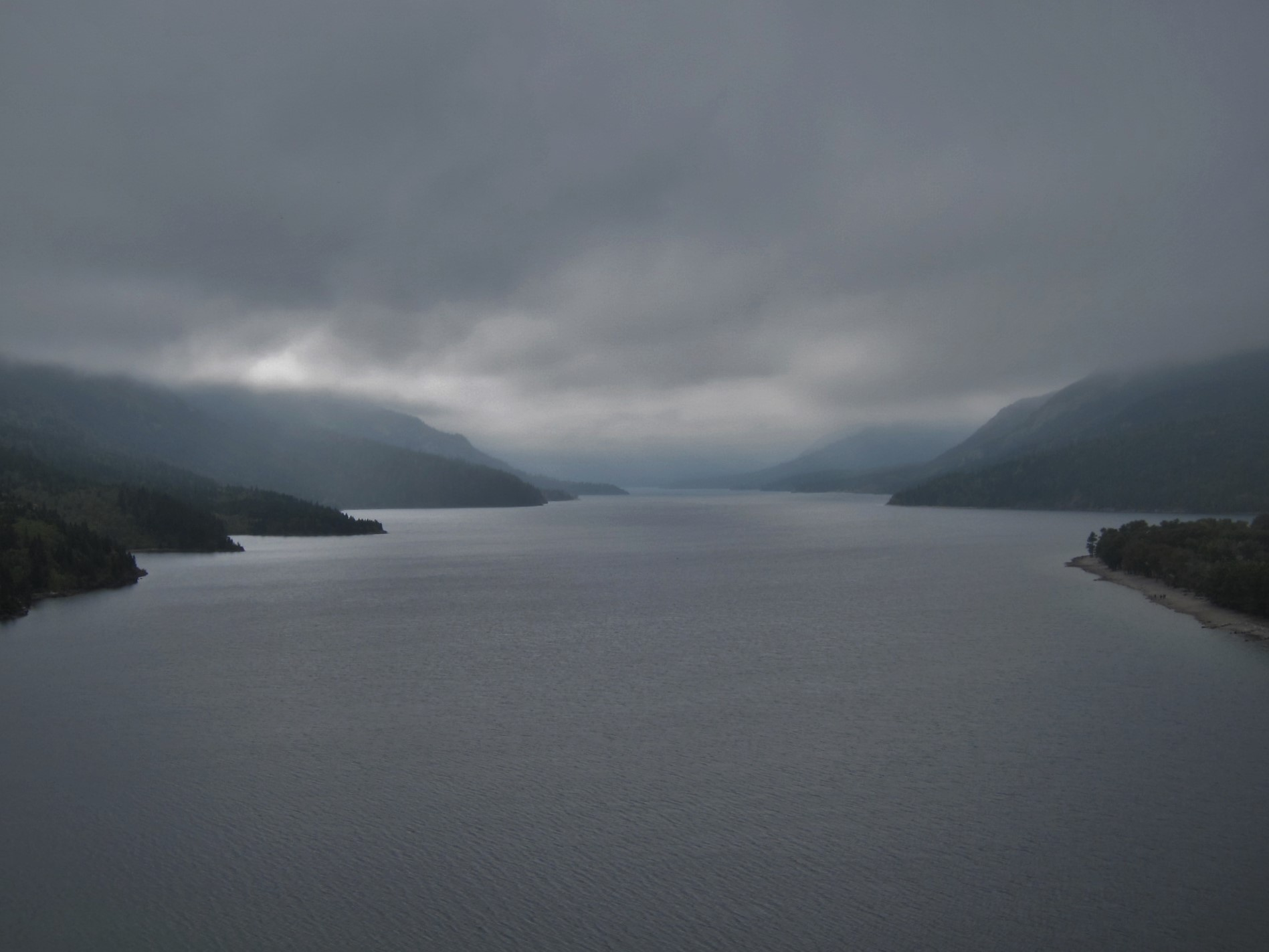
Upper Waterton Lake is an example of a finger lake.

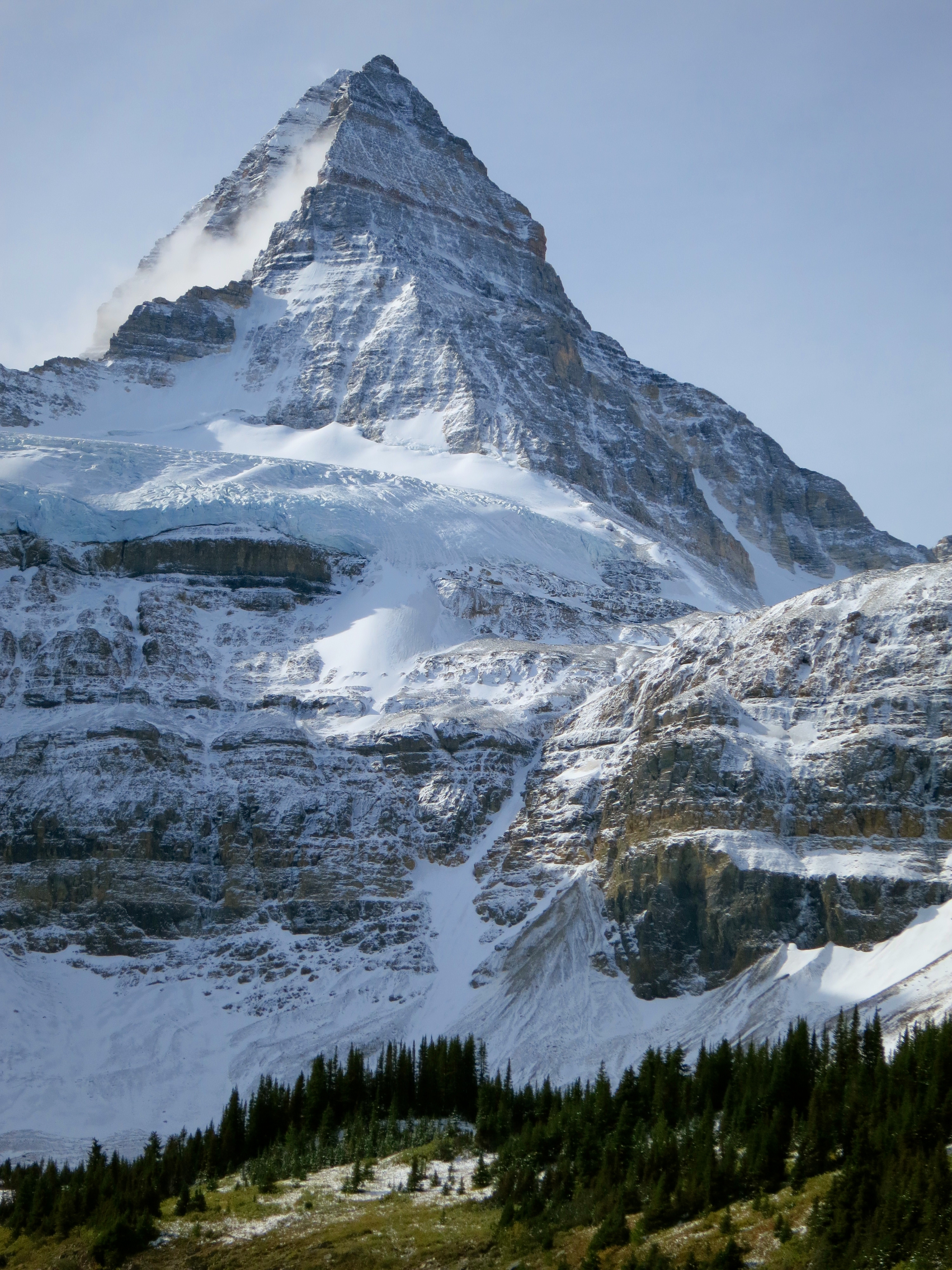
Mount Assiniboine is a glacial horn, or pyramidal peak.

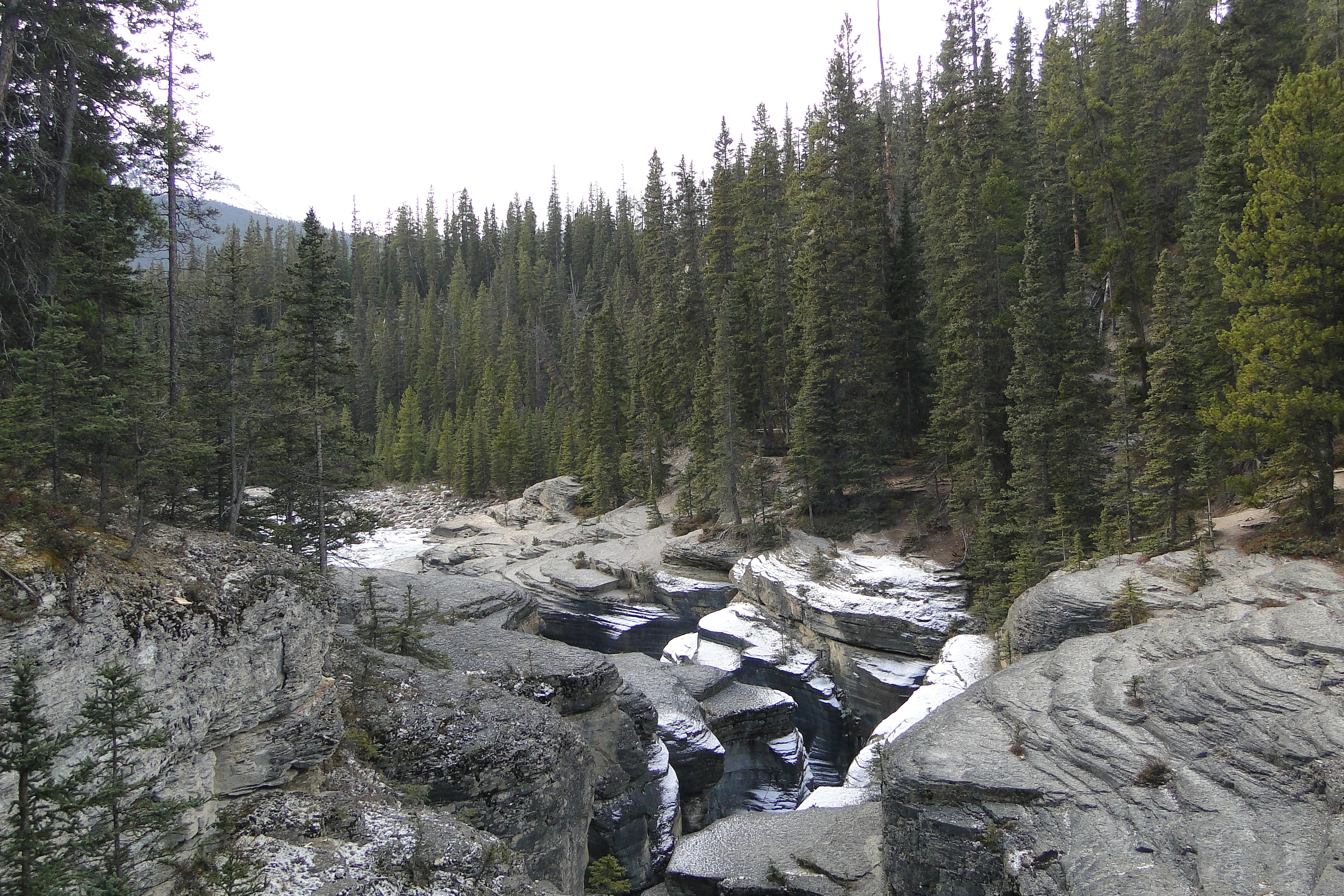
Mistaya Canyon in Banff National Park is an example of a slot canyon.

There are unique rocks visible from or near the GDT in Waterton Lakes National Park in the Clark Range (Section A). Among the typical layers of limestone and dolomite, there are red and green siltstones called argillite, black bands of igneous Purcell Sill, and stromatolites: fossils of cyanobacteria colonies.

Upper Waterton Lake, at the southern terminus (Section A), is the deepest lake in the Canadian Rockies at 148 metres (486 ft). It is a finger lake; glaciers carved its present deep, steep-sided shape out of an ancestral river valley, deposited a dam of debris at the northern end of the valley while retreating, and filled the valley with meltwater.

Mount Assiniboine (Section C) on the divide between Banff National Park and Mount Assiniboine Park is an example of a glacial horn, or pyramidal peak. It was shaped by cirque glaciers that eroded its flat, steep sides, and is frequently referred to as the "Matterhorn of the Rockies". With an elevation of 3,618 metres (11,870 ft), it is one of the ten tallest peaks in the Canadian Rockies.

The Burgess Shale of the Waputik Mountains in Yoho National Park (the Kiwetinok alternate of Section D) is a formation containing large numbers of exceptionally well-preserved fossils dating to over 500 mya. From his discovery of the fossils in 1909 until 1924, Charles Walcott collected 65,000 specimens. The vast diversity of soft-bodied organisms preserved in the formation has been highly informative to paleontology and paleoclimatology.

There are extensive karst systems on or just off the GDT through the Palliser Formation, in and around southern Jasper National Park (Section E). Caves, sinkholes, and slot canyons are formed by slightly acidic surface water dissolving passages in the limestone layers. Examples include caves at the head of Cataract Valley and at the outlet of Medicine Lake, down the Watchtower Access Trail. During most years, the entire flow of the Maligne River drains through underground passages from the lake and emerges in Maligne Canyon, 15 kilometres (9.3 mi) away.

Maligne Canyon itself is an accessible example of a karst slot canyon just off the GDT, at the north end of Section E. It is up to 55 metres (180 ft) deep and just 2 metres (6.6 ft) across at some points. Other examples directly on the GDT include Turbine Canyon in Peter Lougheed Provincial Park, near the south end of Section C; Mistaya Canyon, cut into the Eldon Formation at the north end of Section D; and just north of the Owen Creek trailhead in section E.

Maligne Lake (Section E) is the longest natural lake in the Canadian Rockies, at 22.3 kilometres (13.9 mi). It was formed after the Last Glacial Maximum, c. 13,000 mya, when the glaciers (diminished but still present at the south end of the lake) rapidly receded, then briefly re-advanced to deposit a large terminal moraine, before retreating to the large mountains beyond Coronet Creek. That moraine now forms the north shore of Maligne Lake.

Mount Robson is the highest peak in the Canadian Rockies (elevation 3,954 metres (12,972 ft)) and the most prominent anywhere in the Rocky Mountains (3,128 metres (10,262 ft) from base to peak). Its height is due to its location at the base of a syncline. While nearby mountains are tilted by tectonic forces deforming the rocks, Robson's layers remained relatively horizontal and thus more stable and resistant to erosion. While the highest mountains are usually directly on the continental divide, Mount Robson is several kilometres southwest of the divide, completely within British Columbia. The junction between the North Boundary Trail and the Berg Lake Trail (the transition between Sections F and G) is at the northern base of the Robson Massif.

== Climate ==
The Continental Ranges of the Canadian Rockies that the GDT passes through have a continental climate, with a wide range of temperatures between seasons and moderate precipitation; there is generally more precipitation on the west side of the divide. The trail is mostly covered in snow until June, which can linger well into July, particularly on the northeast sides of passes, due to less direct sunlight and deeper snow drifts caused by the prevailing westerly winds. Of the months that the GDT is typically hiked, June is the wettest, with average precipitation decreasing through the summer and fall. July is the warmest month, with typical daily highs between 20 °C (68 °F) and 30 °C (86 °F). By September, precipitation often falls as snow at higher elevations, and overnight lows in the valleys are near freezing.

Mountain weather is highly variable, and the GDT is no exception, as the trail goes up and down in elevation, from one valley to another, and from one hour to the next. The lapse rate is a drop in air temperature of at least 0.7 °C for every 100 metres (330 ft) increase in elevation. Because the prevailing winds are perpendicular to the mountain ranges, winds below treeline are often lighter and shifting. However, the valleys that are aligned southwest-northeast tend to have strong, steady winds. In the afternoons of hot July and August days, there is a greater chance of sudden thunderstorms that may be accompanied by hail.

== Ecology ==
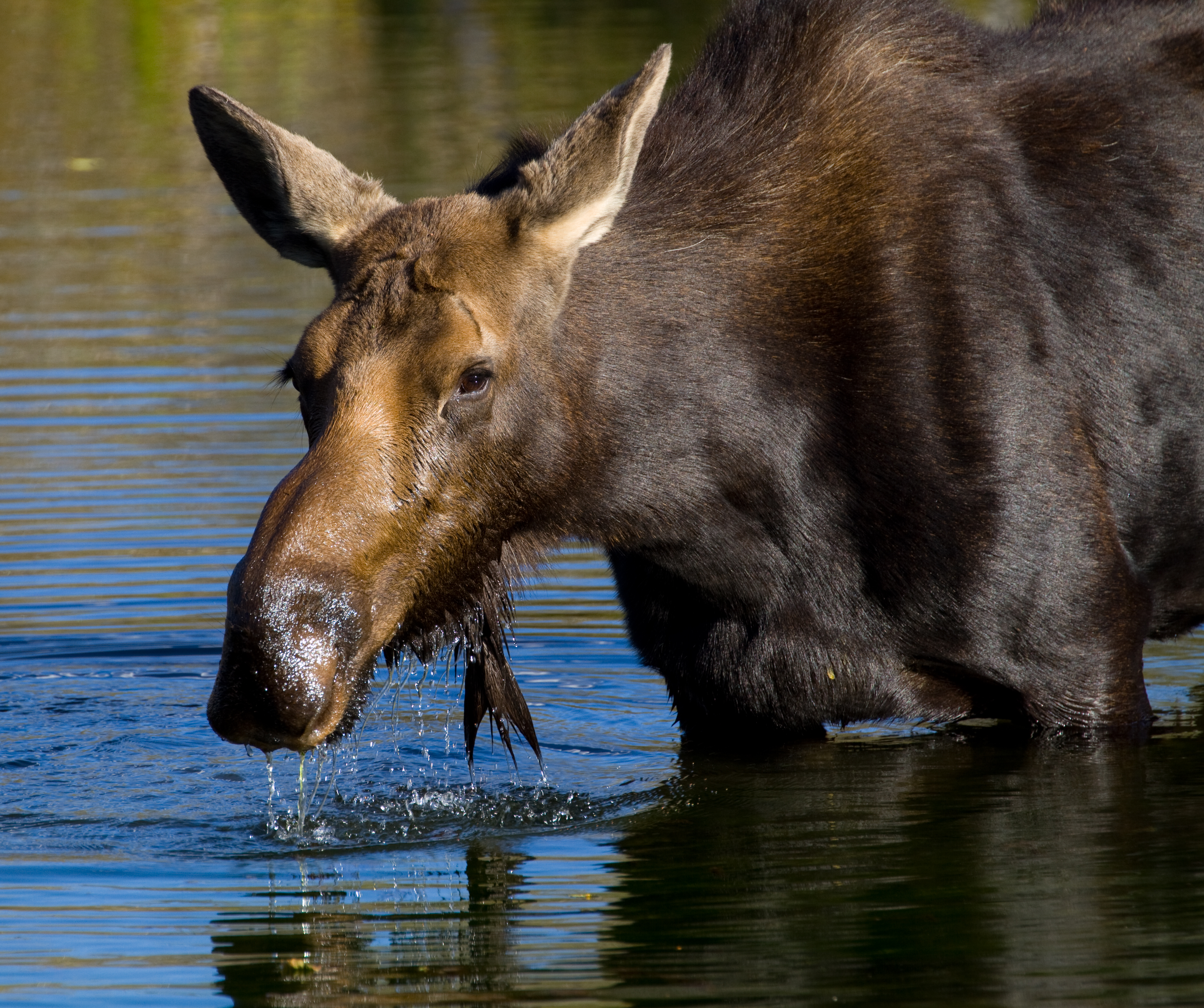
Moose are a temperature-limited species and spend a lot of their summer in wetlands to browse abundant vegetation and stay cool.

The ecosystems that hikers pass through on the Great Divide Trail change drastically as the trail climbs and descends, and only very gradually as hikers progress from one terminus to the other. Elevation largely dictates an area's climate and soil, which directly controls which plants are able to grow, and the total productivity of the area. Although there is a very rough rule of thumb that says the treeline will be about 100 metres (330 ft) lower for every 100 kilometres (62 mi) north, the trend is not strong over the five degrees of latitude that the GDT traverses, and local factors affecting a location's growing conditions are often more important.

The plants, which serve as both the base of the biological community's food web and are themselves habitats, have a strong effect on local animal populations. The animals, in turn, affect the distribution of plants, limiting some through herbivory and spreading others through pollination and seed dispersal. Important pollinators include insects like drone flies, bumble bees, yellow velvet beetles, and butterflies. Animals like red squirrels hide the seeds from cones, some of which end up growing; other species such as grizzly bears eat enormous amounts of berries and pass the seeds in their scat.

Most animals are more active – and therefore most likely to encounter hikers – at dawn and dusk. However some species such as ground squirrels are active during the day, while others including porcupines and bats are largely nocturnal. The largest animals that GDT hikers may see (or see signs of) are moose, especially in wetlands; grizzly and black bears, potentially anywhere but particularly near streams, berry patches, and forest edges; elk, mule deer, cougars, and wolves at lower elevations; and bighorn sheep on or near escape terrain such as vertical cliffs.

Hikers also have a chance to sight members of the À la Pêche and Redrock-Prairie Creek caribou herds in Sections F and G. While these threatened herds try to avoid human activity, they do migrate into the main ranges near the Continental Divide during summer. In previous decades there were three additional herds that the GDT passed near in Sections C and E, but they were extirpated: Banff in 2009, Maligne in 2020, and Brazeau in 2025.

There are hundreds of bird species that reside in or migrate through the Canadian Rockies, however by the time most hikers start, the bright colours and gregarious songs of courtship will have faded. The most common forest birds like chickadees and warblers are small and difficult to spot in dense underbrush or in the tops of conifers, however ponds and streams may offer unobstructed views of waterfowl or osprey and eagles circling for fish. Open slopes at lower elevations also offer chances to watch raptors hunting for rodents and other small prey. Golden eagles patrol the alpine, and may attack animals as large as bighorn lambs.

=== Montane ===
The mountain valleys and lower slopes have montane ecosystems, which have a relatively hospitable climate that allows for the greatest diversity of plants and animals in the mountains. This habitat supports populations of herbivores and their predators year-round. Some species, like caribou and mountain goats that in warmer seasons use high elevations as refuges from the predators in the valleys, still need to overwinter in the montane zone.

Lodgepole pine forests are very common in every section of the GDT (and dominate the Canadian Rockies in general). This species is fire-dependent, having serotinous cones that release large numbers of seeds when heated, allowing them to take advantage of rich post-fire soil and reduced competition. In the first decades after a fire, this leads to extremely dense "dog hair" stands of young pine that thin as the trees grow and shade out their neighbours. The GDT passes through several burned areas, allowing hikers to see the different stages of regeneration.

Stages of natural regeneration after wildfire along the GDT.

Regeneration in the first year after the 2024 Jasper wildfire, near the north end of Section E.

Very dense regenerating lodgepole pine at Akamina Campground in section A, seven years after the Kenow Wildfire.

Regeneration twenty years after the Tokumm-Verendrye fire in northern Kootenay National Park in section C.

Depending on site conditions, lodgepole pine can grow to over 30 metres (98 ft) in under a century, but seldom live to two centuries at the GDT's latitudes. As the stand gets taller, slower growing pine die off and the survivors drop their lower branches, so the stand becomes increasingly open, windy, and therefore dryer. This creates conditions for a dense understory of grasses like Hair Wild Rye; herbs like wild strawberry, yarrow, arnica, and paintbrush; and larger shrubs such as buffalo berry, juniper, wild rose, and bearberry.

In areas that have not had recent wildfire, the lodgepole pine overstory is often succeeded by slower growing white spruce. These generally create more dense, cool, and damp stands that favour a shade-tolerant understory of feather mosses, lichens, bunchberry, wintergreen, horsetail, Labrador tea, and bog cranberry. In a few low-elevation places such as in the Crowsnest Pass and around the town of Jasper, Douglas fir is another tree that can outlast and replace lodgepole pine. Formerly there were Douglas fir stands throughout Section A, but despite having fire-resistant bark, the Kenow wildfire burned so intensely that the soil and roots were destroyed.

Deciduous-dominant areas are less common, but at frequently disturbed sites, GDT hikers will pass through sunny aspen forests with a lush understory of red osier dogwood, cow parsnip, geraniums, violets, and peavines. Along floodplains and poorly drained wetlands, the GDT passes through dense willow fields such as the Maligne (section E) and Jackpine valleys (section G). These areas also commonly have sedges, rushes, horsetail, and bog birch.

=== Subalpine ===
Yellow glacier lilies can cover the ground in sub-alpine meadows and are an important food source for many animals.

The subalpine transition zone is characterized by slower-growing trees adapted to a shorter growing season and high precipitation – especially snow. Along the GDT, the most common tree above montane forests is subalpine fir, followed by Engelmann spruce. Sections A–C also has stands of subalpine larch, which is a conifer species that entirely sheds its needles each fall, generally in late September. These stands of trees are extremely dense, which delays snowmelt in the spring.

More rarely, hikers may find the endangered whitebark pine, quickly distinguishable from lodgepole pine by its groups of five needles. The longest-lived tree in the Canadian Rockies, it grows slowly on high, windy ridges, where Clark's nutcracker buries and forgets about its seeds. Whitebark pine has no other means of natural reproduction, and have been decimated by the European invasive white pine blister rust and mountain pine beetle. In recent years, Parks Canada has been planting whitebark pine seedlings from rust-resistant stock, and using pheremone packets to deter mountain pine beetle.

The understory is also made up of moisture-loving plants. Shrubs, such as grouseberry, squashberry, buffaloberry, shrubby cinquefoil, bearberry, and Labrador tea; and a huge number of wildflowers both in the shelter of trees and on sunny slopes, such as yellow glacier-lily, yellow columbine, heathers, cut-leaved anemone, subalpine fleabane, and tall Jacob's ladder. Those hiking the GDT during the usual summer time frame will pass through wildflower displays on most days.

At treeline, the upper limit at which trees can grow, many species grow in a bonsai-like fashion called krummholz. These low, twisted forms are an adaptation to survive the intense, bitter winds on exposed mountain slopes.

=== Alpine ===
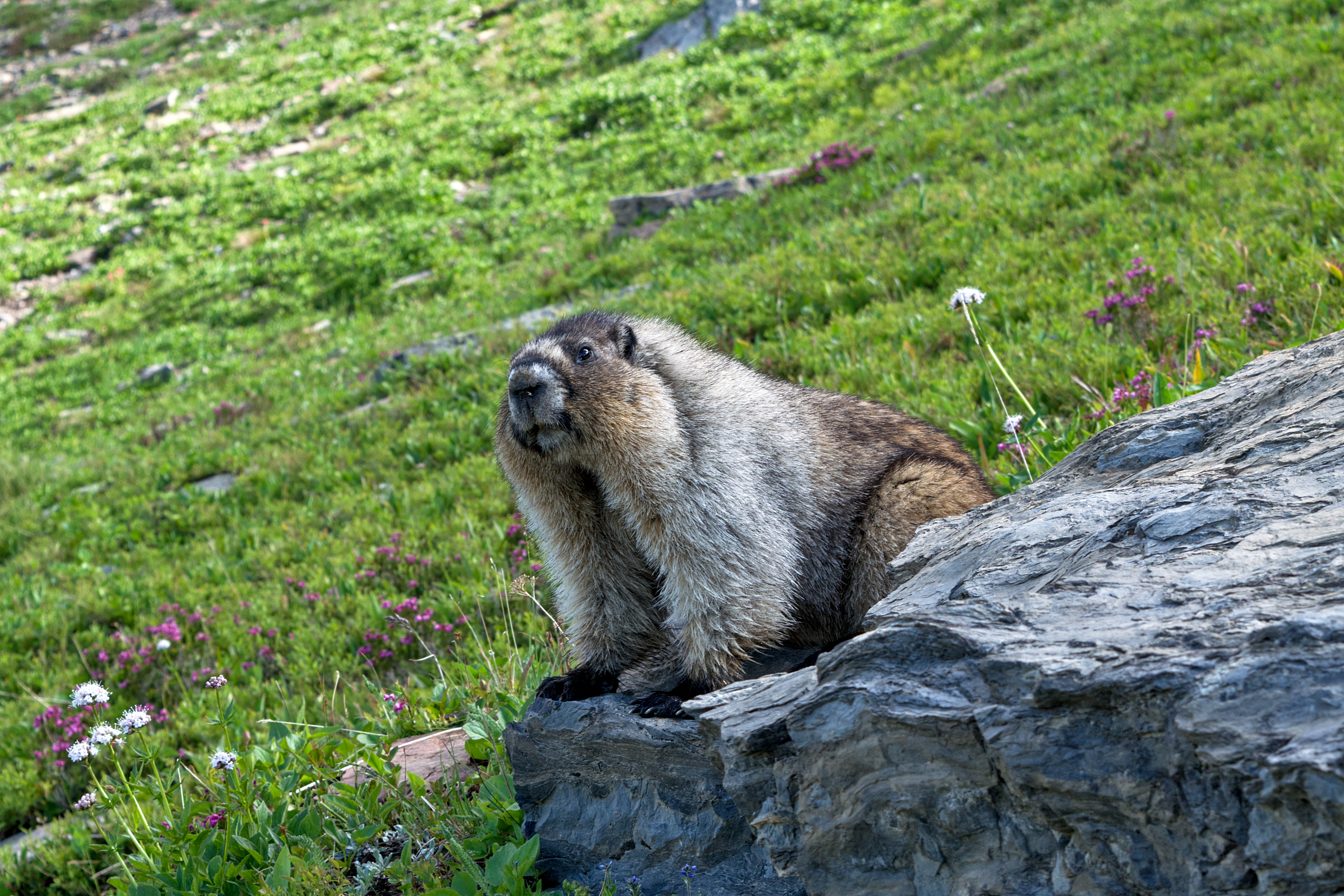
The hoary marmot hibernates in the winter, when deep snow makes it too hard to find food in the alpine.

Above the treeline, alpine ecosystems have even harsher conditions that limit productivity. Soils are rocky and poor, winds stronger, and temperatures generally much lower (although not during inversions). Alpine plants are adapted to the wind, cold, and ultraviolet radiation. These adaptations include low profiles, parabolic flowers to gather sun, and quick bursts of growth during the extremely short growing season. Because there is so little time to flower and pollinate, many reproduce vegetatively, such as through runners.

Alpine meadows can provide lush grazing in the summers for southern mountain caribou herds in sections F and G. There are grasses, sedges, herbs, mosses, and lichens, as well as many small wildflowers such as paintbrush, arctic lupine, anemones, alpine bluebells, arctic harebell, and forget-me-nots. Dryer slopes might have moss campion (not related to mosses), mountain avens, cinquefoil that grow in dense cushions to reduce the loss of heat and moisture. Less dense matts include alpine pussytoes, cut-leaved fleabane, sweet-vetch, and saxifrage.

Although some montane animals may visit and use the alpine, relatively few species are adapted to live year round in this environment. Two commonly-heard animal are the marmot and pika, both of which live in colonies in alpine meadows. When hikers or other animals are detected, sentries whistle or squeak to alert others to hide in their burrows. Their strategies to survive alpine winters differ, however: marmots hibernate while pikas collect and dry a wide variety of alpine vegetation each fall
