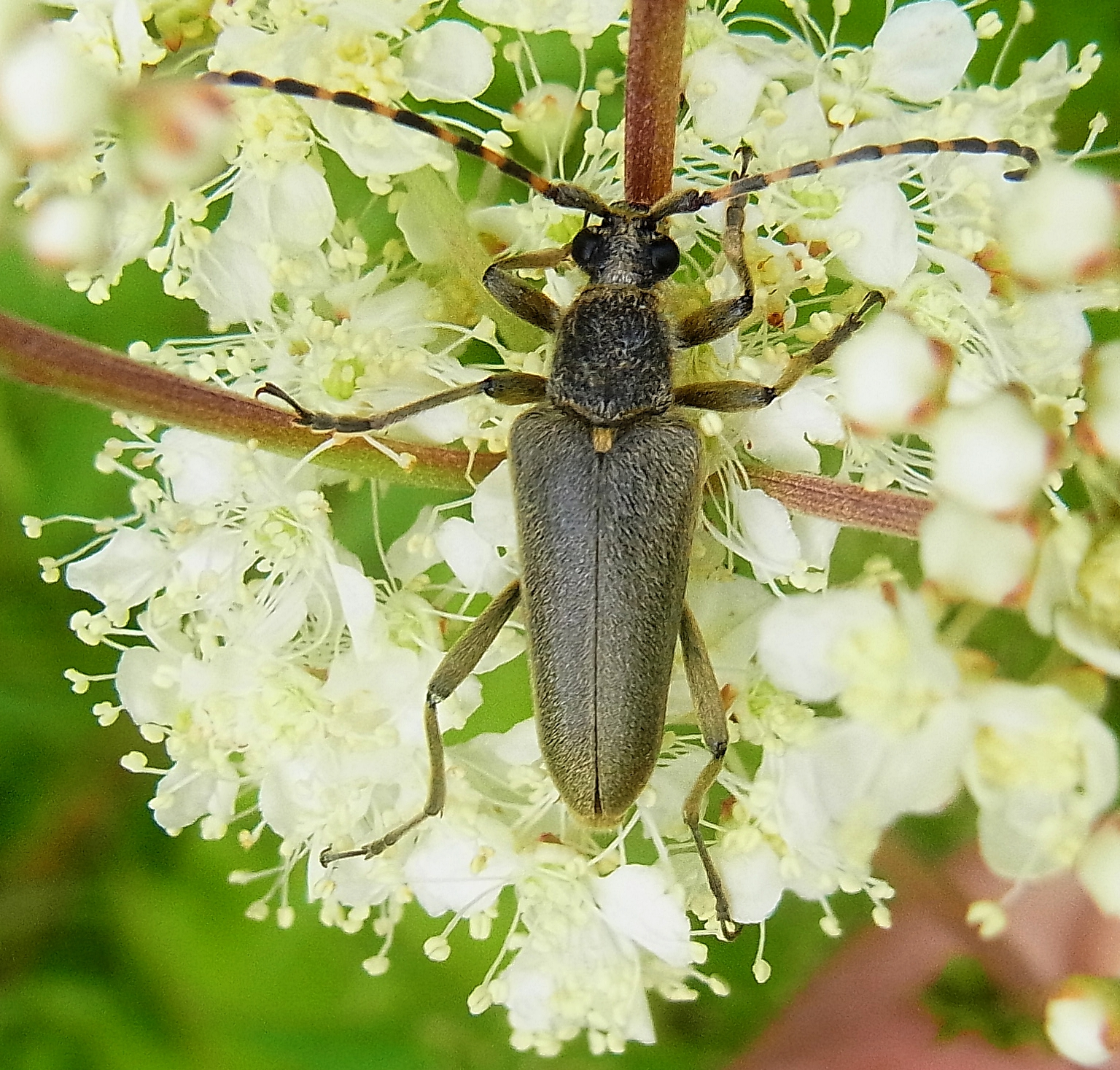
- Lepturobosca virens

Scientific classification
- Kingdom: Animalia
- Phylum: Arthropoda
- Class: Insecta
- Order: Coleoptera
- Suborder: Polyphaga
- Infraorder: Cucujiformia
- Family: Cerambycidae
- Subfamily: Lepturinae
- Tribe: Lepturini
- Genus: Lepturobosca; Reitter 1912

Synonyms
- Cosmosalia Casey, 1913

= Lepturobosca =

Genus of beetles

Lepturobosca is a genus of longhorned beetles in the family Cerambycidae.

== Species ==
These three species are members of the genus Lepturobosca:

- Lepturobosca chrysocoma (Kirby in Richardson, 1837)
- Lepturobosca nigrolineata (Bland, 1865)
- Lepturobosca virens (Linnaeus, 1758)
