= Lepturobosca nigrolineata =

Scientific classification
- Kingdom: Animalia
- Phylum: Arthropoda
- Clade: Pancrustacea
- Class: Insecta
- Order: Coleoptera
- Suborder: Polyphaga
- Infraorder: Cucujiformia
- Family: Cerambycidae
- Genus: Lepturobosca
- Species: L. nigrolineata

Binomial name
- Lepturobosca nigrolineata (Bland, 1865)

Synonyms
- Anoplodera nigrolineata; Cosmosalia nigrolineata; Cosmosalia nigrolineata nigrolineata; Leptura (Cosmosalia) nigrolineata; Leptura (Leptura) nigrolineata; Leptura nigro-lineata Bland, 1865; Leptura nigrolineata; Leptura nigrolineata truxali Papp, 1955

Species of beetle

Lepturobosca nigrolineata is a species of beetle in the family Cerambycidae. It was described by Bland in 1865.
