= La Coulotte Peak =

Mountain in the Canadian Rockies

- Location within Alberta Location within British Columbia Location within Canada

Highest point
- Elevation: 2,438 m (7,999 ft)
- Prominence: 285 m (935 ft)
- Parent peak: Scarpe Mountain (2613 m)
- Listing: Mountains of Alberta; Mountains of British Columbia
- Coordinates: 49°11′59″N 114°19′05″W

Geography
- Country: Canada
- Provinces: Alberta and British Columbia
- Parent range: Flathead Range
- Topo map: NTS 82G1 Sage Creek

La Coulotte Peak is located SE of Fernie and straddles the Continental Divide marking the Alberta-British Columbia border. It was named after La Coulotte near Lens, France where Canadian troops fought the German army at the Battle of Vimy Ridge in World War I.

== See also ==
- List of peaks on the Alberta–British Columbia border
- La Coulotte Ridge
