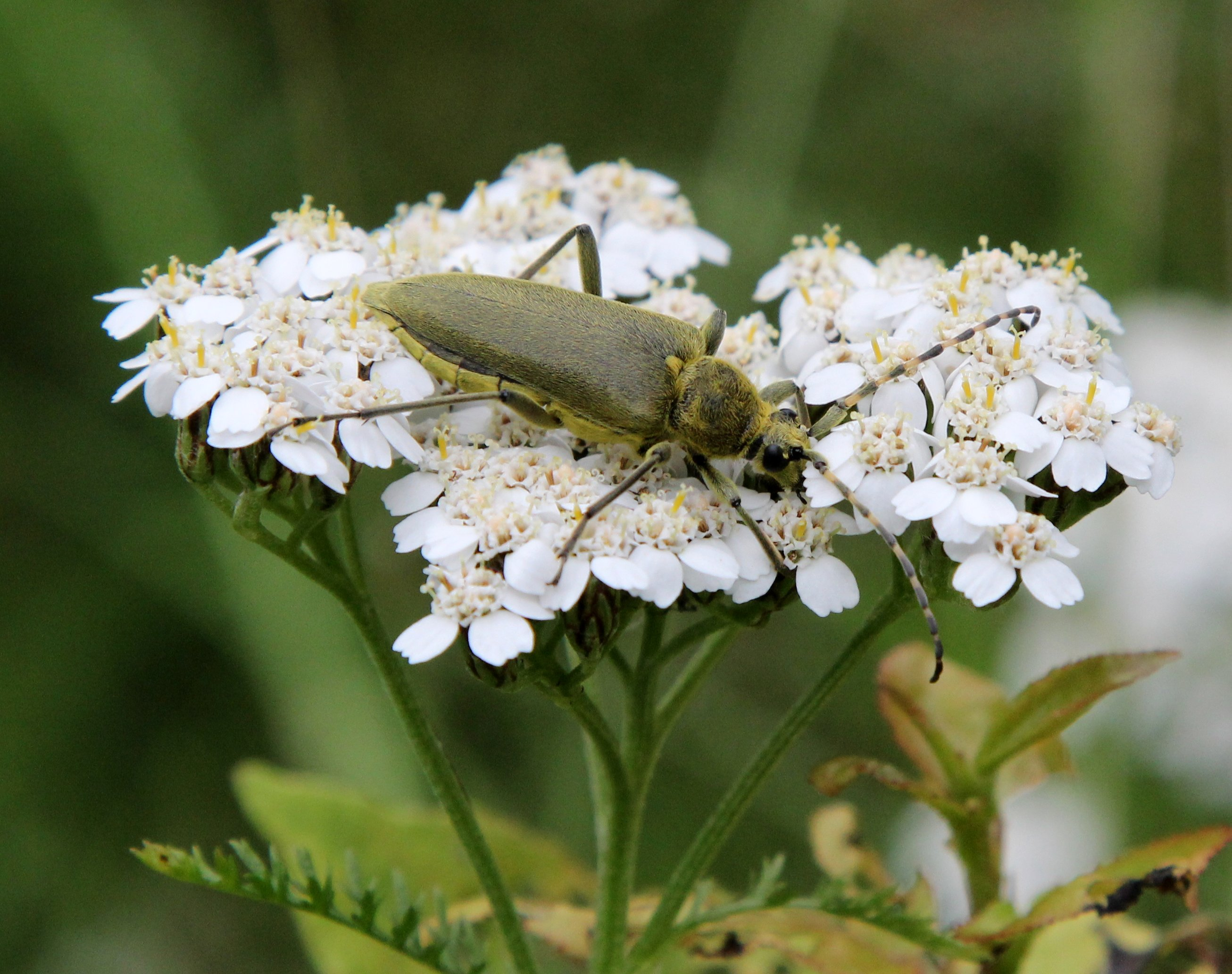

Scientific classification
- Kingdom: Animalia
- Phylum: Arthropoda
- Clade: Pancrustacea
- Class: Insecta
- Order: Coleoptera
- Suborder: Polyphaga
- Infraorder: Cucujiformia
- Family: Cerambycidae
- Genus: Lepturobosca
- Species: L. virens

Binomial name
- Lepturobosca virens (Linnaeus, 1758)

Synonyms
- Lepturobosca Anoplodera virens (Linnaeus) Gressitt, 1947; Lepturobosca Leptura kenteiensis Pic, 1900; Lepturobosca Leptura virens Linnaeus, 1758; Lepturobosca Leptura viridis Voet, 1804

= Lepturobosca virens =

Species of beetle

Lepturobosca virens, commonly known as the green longhorn beetle, is a species of beetles in the longhorn beetle family, that can be found in Europe and Russia.

== Description ==
Both sexes are of the same colour, but the size may vary. Females are slightly larger than males (14–22 mm). The species colour is dark green, with striped antennae. The body is hairy.

== Habitat ==
The host plants are coniferous and deciduous trees.
