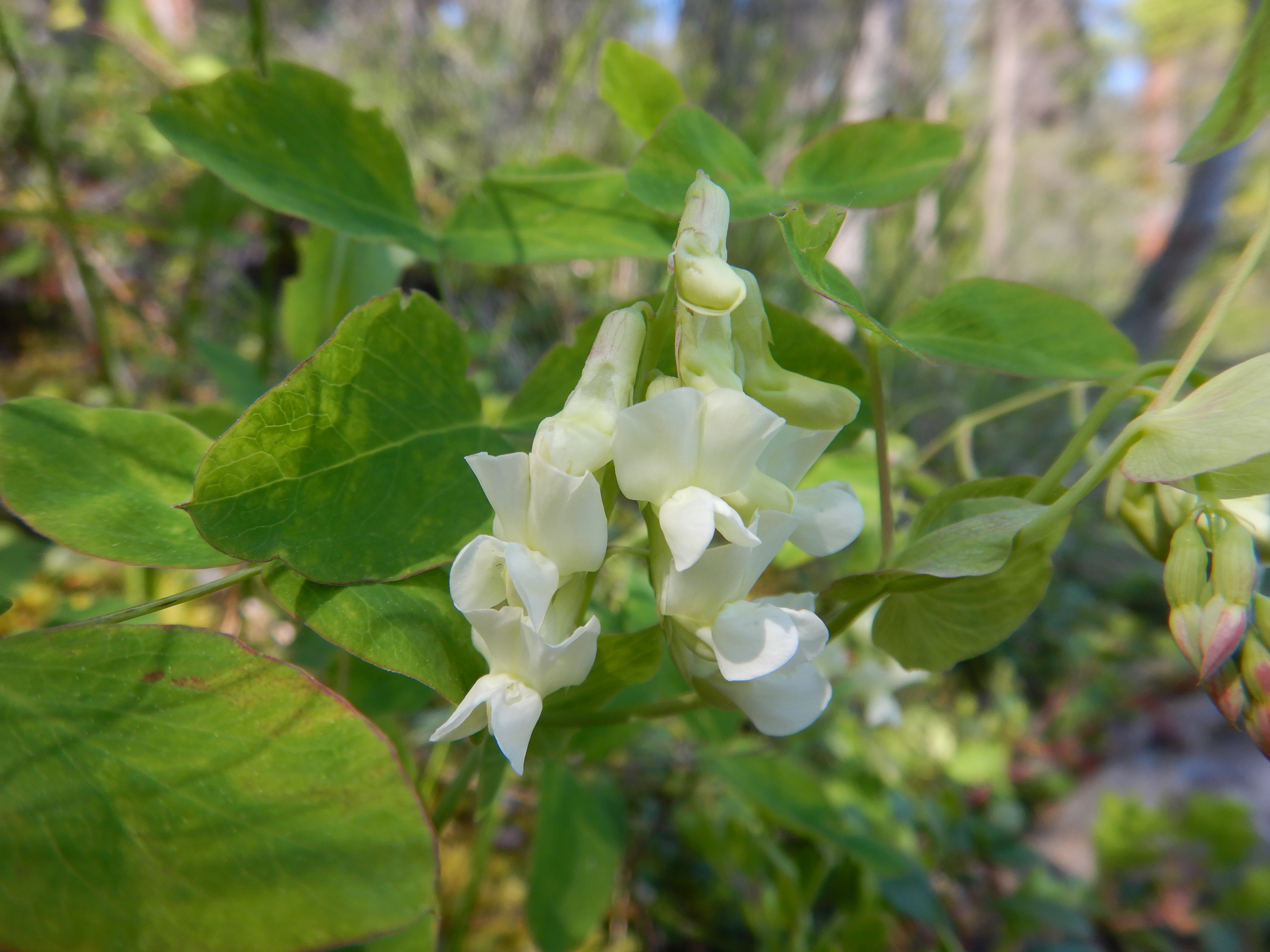

Conservation status
- Secure (NatureServe)

Scientific classification
- Kingdom: Plantae
- Clade: Tracheophytes
- Clade: Angiosperms
- Clade: Eudicots
- Clade: Rosids
- Order: Fabales
- Family: Fabaceae
- Subfamily: Faboideae
- Genus: Lathyrus
- Species: L. ochroleucus

Binomial name
- Lathyrus ochroleucus Hook.

Synonyms
- Ervum ochroleucum (Hook.) Alef.; Lathyrus albidus Aikin ex Eaton; Lathyrus glaucifolius L.C.Beck; Orobus ochroleucus (Hook.) A.Braun

= Lathyrus ochroleucus =

Plant species in the pea family

Lathyrus ochroleucus, the cream pea, is a species of wild pea in the family Fabaceae. It is native to the northern United States and Canada. The species has cream-colored flowers with a variation of off-white with cream yellow to a white with a light white blue.

== Taxonomy ==
Lathyrus ochroleucus was scientifically described and named by William Jackson Hooker in 1831. It was proposed by Friedrich Alefeld that it should be moved to the Ervum genus, but the classification in Lathyrus continues to be accepted. Alongside the rest of the genus it is part of the Fabaceae family. The species has no varieties, but does have four botanical synonyms.

== Range ==
The cream pea is native to North America from Alaska and Nunavut southwards to Idaho and West Virginia. In Canada it grows in every province and territory as far east as Quebec, but not in the Atlantic provinces.
