= Casket Mountain =

Summit in Alberta, Canada

Coordinates: 53.81°N 119.95°W

Casket Mountain is a summit in Alberta, Canada.

Casket Mountain was so named on account of a casket-shaped rock outcropping.
