= Palliser Pass =

Mountain pass in the Canadian Rockies

- Location within Alberta Location within British Columbia Location within Canada
- Elevation: 2,084 m (6,837 ft)

Location
- Location: Alberta and British Columbia, Canada
- Range: Canadian Rockies
- Coordinates: 50°42′29″N 115°23′15″W
- Topo map: NTS 82J11 Kananaskis Lakes

Palliser Pass, 2,084 m (6,837 ft), is a mountain pass in the Canadian Rockies, located on the British Columbia / Alberta boundary at the south end of Banff National Park and at the north end of Height of the Rockies Provincial Park in British Columbia. The pass is located north of the headwaters of the Palliser River.

== Name origin ==
See Palliser Expedition.
