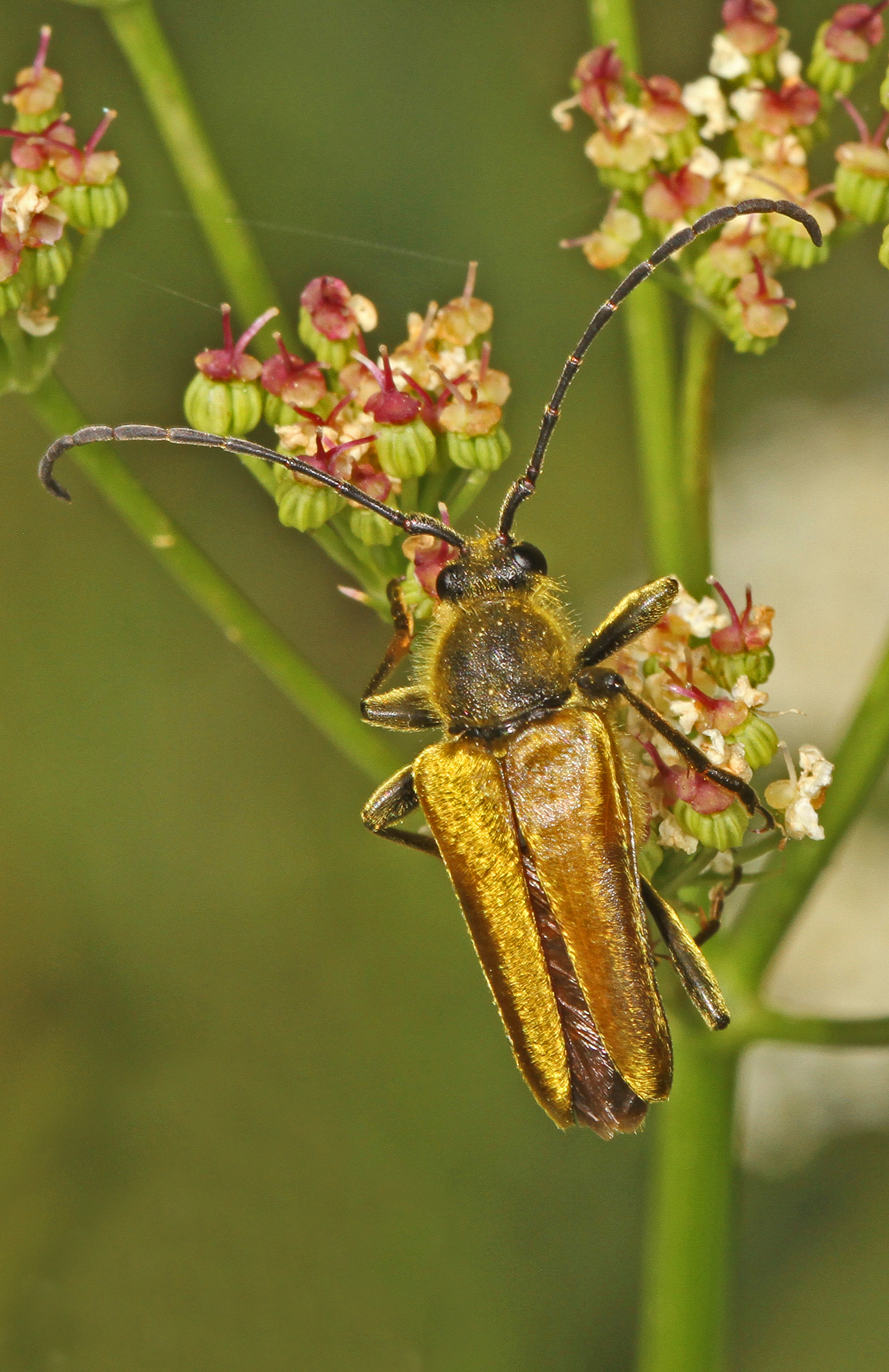

Scientific classification
- Kingdom: Animalia
- Phylum: Arthropoda
- Clade: Pancrustacea
- Class: Insecta
- Order: Coleoptera
- Suborder: Polyphaga
- Infraorder: Cucujiformia
- Family: Cerambycidae
- Genus: Lepturobosca
- Species: L. chrysocoma

Binomial name
- Lepturobosca chrysocoma Kirby

Synonyms
- Cosmosalia chrysocoma

= Lepturobosca chrysocoma =

Species of beetle

Lepturobosca chrysocoma is a species of beetle in the family Cerambycidae. It was described as Cosmosalia chrysocoma by William Kirby in 1837. In 1998, comparison of Cosmalia chrysocoma with Lepturobosca virens by the Russian entomologist Alexander Ivanovich Miroshnikov resulted in Cosmalia and Lepturobosca grouped together under the name Lepturobosca. Common names used for this beetle include Yellow velvet beetle, Golden flower longhorn beetle and Golden-haired flower longhorn.

This beetle is known to occur in Canada in British Columbia, Alberta, Saskatchewan, Manitoba, Ontario, Quebec, New Brunswick, Nova Scotia, Newfoundland, Prince Edward Island, Northwest Territories and Yukon Territory. It has been found in the United States in Montana and Wyoming.

The beetles are 10–20 millimetres (0.39–0.79 in) long and are covered by a dense coat of golden hairs. Adult beetles are frequently seen feeding on flowers in the summer. Their hairy coats pick up pollen, which is transferred to other flowers as they feed, allowing pollination.

Larvae feed on decaying wood of trees, including Picea mariana and Populus.

This species is a known host for Coleocentrus quebecensis, a parasitic wasp in the subfamily Acaenitinae.
