= La Coulotte Ridge =

Ridge in Alberta and British Columbia, Canada

- Location within Alberta Location within British Columbia Location within Canada

Highest point
- Elevation: 2,438 m (7,999 ft)
- Prominence: 325 m (1,066 ft)
- Listing: Mountains of Alberta; Mountains of British Columbia
- Coordinates: 49°11′13″N 114°17′31″W

Geography
- Country: Canada
- Provinces: Alberta and British Columbia
- District: Kootenay Land District
- Parent range: Flathead Range
- Topo map: NTS 82G1 Sage Creek

La Coulotte Ridge is a mountain ridge which straddles the Continental Divide marking the Alberta-British Columbia border. It was named after La Coulotte in France.

== See also ==
- List of peaks on the Alberta–British Columbia border
- La Coulotte Peak
