= 2026 Tumbler Ridge shooting =

Mass shooting in British Columbia, Canada

- Location: 55.1326°N 121.0018°W (Fellers Avenue); 55.1238°N 121.0016°W (Tumbler Ridge Secondary School); Tumbler Ridge, British Columbia, Canada
- Date: February 10, 2026 c. 2:20 p.m. (MST; UTC-7)
- Attack type: School shooting; mass shooting; mass murder; murder–suicide; familicide
- Weapons: School shooting: Long gun; Modified rifle (Note: According to the FBI, the shooter was in possession of an SKS rifle modified with a 3D-printed grip and Hell-fire trigger that she intended to use in the shooting. It was used in the shooting according to Bryant.); Improvised explosive device; Shooting in perpetrator's home: Shotgun
- Deaths: 9 (2 at the perpetrator's home; 7 at the school, including the perpetrator)
- Injuries: 27
- Perpetrator: Jesse Van Rootselaar
- Motive: Under investigation
- Accused: James Cody Bryant
- Charges: Conspiracy to murder persons in a foreign country

On February 10, 2026, a mass shooting occurred in Tumbler Ridge, British Columbia, Canada. On that afternoon, Jesse Van Rootselaar killed her mother and half-brother at their home before going to Tumbler Ridge Secondary School, where she killed six people and injured 27 others before killing herself. Van Rootselaar was a former student of the school.

An investigation found that Van Rootselaar had a ChatGPT account that was banned in June 2025 for making violent queries and discussing gun violence, but OpenAI, the company that owns ChatGPT, declined to contact law enforcement. Victims' families and the province of British Columbia subsequently filed more than thirty lawsuits against OpenAI, alleging that the shooting could have been prevented. In October, a 30-year-old US citizen was arrested in Washington state for aiding Van Rootselaar in planning the shooting.

The incident was the deadliest mass shooting in Canada since the Nova Scotia attacks in 2020 and the deadliest school shooting in Canada since the École Polytechnique massacre in 1989.

== Background ==
Tumbler Ridge is a small mining town with a population of 2,399, according to the 2021 census. Tumbler Ridge Secondary School is a public secondary school operated by School District 59 Peace River South, and it is the designated secondary school for the town's primary school. For the 2025–26 school year, the school had 191 students from grades 7 to 12.

Gun control legislation in Canada was greatly reinforced with the passage of the Firearms Act in 1995, following the 1989 École Polytechnique massacre in Montreal. After the 2020 Nova Scotia attacks, such restrictions were further strengthened, with the sale, transport, importation or use of certain models of "assault-style" firearms banned via an Order in Council, with the deadline for firearm disposal set at October 30, 2026. The Canadian Firearms Program of the Royal Canadian Mounted Police (RCMP) is tasked with enforcing the act.

== Attacks ==
=== Shooting of family members ===
The attacker's mother and 11-year-old half brother were shot and killed with a shotgun at their home at Fellers Avenue in Tumbler Ridge. Police had already been called to the school when a surviving resident of the home and neighbours alerted them to this attack; the Vancouver Sun reported that the surviving resident was the 8-year-old half-brother of the shooter.

According to the US criminal complaint unveiled on October 6, 2026, co-conspirator James Cody Bryant was in contact with Van Rootselaar in the minutes immediately after the home shooting, explaining to Van Rootselaar, "who didn’t know how to drive," how to start the family's car in order to proceed to the high school to kill the other victims. A neighbour observed Van Rootselaar driving into a snowbank. Van Rootselaar started a 20 second long livestream on Twitch which showed her sitting in her car with a rifle and another long gun in her lap.

=== School shooting ===
Van Rootselaar arrived at the school in her family’s vehicle and initially tried to enter through a locked door. After failing to gain access, she proceeded along the side of the building, entered through an unlocked second entrance, and opened fire on students and staff with a rifle, first killing a victim in a stairwell. She killed five others in the school's library. The attacker ignited an explosive device and threw it in to the school’s computer room and library, causing visible blast damage. At approximately 2:20 p.m. MST, RCMP received a report of an active shooter at the school, which is approximately 1.5 kilometres (0.93 mi) from the family home. An alarm in the school instructed students to close the doors for a lockdown. Students then barricaded the doors with tables. A 17-year-old student in the school gym reported hearing "12 shots ring out in quick succession". An Alert Ready emergency alert was released in the region by the RCMP at around 3:15 p.m. MST, asking residents to shelter in place due to the active shooter situation. Other schools in the area were also placed on lockdown. The police emergency alert was cancelled at 6:45 p.m. MST. Premier of British Columbia David Eby said the police had reached the school within two minutes of the initial reports. The attacker shot at the four responding RCMP officers before she retreated into an empty room, where she shot and killed herself. Police recovered a long gun, said to have been the weapon mainly used in the shooting, and a modified rifle, initially reported to be a handgun, at the scene.

Later on the day of the shooting, School District 59 announced that both schools in Tumbler Ridge would remain closed for the rest of the week.

== Victims ==
Six people were found dead inside the school; a seventh was mistakenly reported as deceased en route to the hospital but survived. The dead at the school were identified as a 39-year-old education assistant Shannda Aviugana-Durand, three female students all aged 12, and two male students aged 12 and 13. Two people were found dead at a residence in Tumbler Ridge. RCMP confirmed that they were the perpetrator's mother, Jennifer Strang, (Note: RCMP identified her by her legal name, Jennifer Jacobs.) and the perpetrator's 11-year-old half brother. Both had been shot before the perpetrator attacked the school.

Twenty-seven other people were treated for injuries, including two with serious injuries. A Shock Trauma Air Rescue Service aircraft was dispatched from Grande Prairie, Alberta. In a press conference, the British Columbia RCMP confirmed that two injured people were airlifted to Vancouver hospitals. One, a 19-year-old woman, was released from the hospital on February 16, while a 12-year-old girl with multiple gunshot wounds to the head and neck was airlifted to British Columbia Children's Hospital in Vancouver, and required several surgeries. She sustained a catastrophic brain injury that left her with permanent cognitive and physical disabilities. She was released from the intensive care unit in April 2026 after her condition stabilized. She was subsequently released from the hospital in October.

== Perpetrator ==
Undated photograph of Van Rootselaar

Jesse Van Rootselaar (August 4, 2007 – February 10, 2026), also known as Jesse Strang, was identified as the suspected shooter by RCMP deputy commissioner Dwayne McDonald, after initially being described by the RCMP as "a female in a dress with brown hair".

McDonald stated that Van Rootselaar was a trans woman who had dropped out of school at age 14, about four years prior to the shooting. Under the law, education is compulsory until age 16, but "it appears that no one intervened to keep her in school." According to McDonald, there was no information to suggest that Van Rootselaar had been bullied at school.

=== Family ===
Jesse Van Rootselaar was born to Justin Van Rootselaar and Jennifer Strang. Jesse Van Rootselaar was estranged from her father, which he blamed on choices made by her mother. Her father also said that she never used his last name, Van Rootselaar. Instead, she used her mother's last name, Strang.

Van Rootselaar and her siblings had been the subject of custody disputes between their parents, and they had moved between Newfoundland and Labrador, including the town of Lawn where Jennifer Strang grew up, and parts of Western Canada, including Grande Cache, Alberta and Powell River, British Columbia, multiple times between 2010 and 2015. Jennifer Strang was in the process of divorcing her husband, who was the father of three of her children (including the 11-year-old son killed alongside her) and who resided in Alberta at the time of the attack.

=== Interest in guns and violence ===
Van Rootselaar's YouTube profile picture featured an anime-style mascot and a rifle set against a pink-and-white-striped background. A TikTok account, which used the same profile image under the username "jessestrangg", featured multiple reposted videos of the transgender mass shooter who killed six people at a Christian school in Nashville in 2023. In a social media post in c. 2022, Van Rootselaar's mother "promoted the teenager's YouTube channel ... noting that her child 'posts about hunting, self-reliance, guns'". The Daily Telegraph reported that videos on the YouTube channel show Van Rootselaar "firing a high-powered Desert Eagle handgun at a shooting range ... carrying out target practice with a tactical 12-gauge shotgun and firing a semi-automatic carbine at targets". A Reddit account linked to the shooter posted a video in 2023 at a firing range.

About five months before the shooting, she created an account on WatchPeopleDie.tv, a web forum dedicated to gore videos and violence that has been frequented by multiple other mass shooters, including Natalie Rupnow, whose profile was visited by Van Rootselaar. Van Rootselaar's posts on the website included multiple photos of firearms, including an SKS rifle and a KRISS Vector gun, and videos of her firing them. Van Rootselaar created a mall shooting simulator game on Roblox, according to the platform's administrators.

Van Rootselaar had previously held a valid minor's licence (12–17), which only allows for temporarily borrowing a non-restricted (ordinary rifle or shotgun) firearm for approved purposes; it had expired in 2024. She was not the owner of any firearms because acquiring and possessing firearms is not allowed with a minor's licence. According to McDonald, Jennifer Strang "had a valid firearms licence but did not have any restricted firearms that would require registration". (Note: Under the Firearms Act, a holder of a firearms possession and acquisition licence is permitted to acquire and possess non-restricted firearms (ordinary rifles and shotguns) without registering them. Registration is only required if the firearm is classified as restricted.) RCMP confirmed that in a previous police visit in the past two years, "firearms were seized under the Criminal Code", but that "the lawful owner of those firearms petitioned for them to be returned, and they were". A relative told The Globe and Mail that the seized guns had been returned "roughly a month" prior to the shooting.

In June 2025, OpenAI had banned a ChatGPT account belonging to Van Rootselaar due to violent queries. However, administrators had opted not to report the account to authorities at the time. The Wall Street Journal reported that Van Rootselaar's conversations with the chatbot "described scenarios involving gun violence over the course of several days", and that these messages were "flagged by an automated review system". At that time, about a dozen OpenAI employees debated turning the chatlogs over to law enforcement. A spokeswoman for OpenAI confirmed that the company had banned Van Rootselaar's account. However, the official stated that it determined that her activity did not meet the criteria for reporting to law enforcement.

=== Drug use and mental health ===
Van Rootselaar wrote on social media that she "regularly took DMT" and tried to "burn [her] house down after using psychedelic mushrooms". The mother of one of the victims, who was also friends with the shooter's family, confirmed that Van Rootselaar had "tried to light a mattress on fire 'and burn the house down'". After using psilocybin mushrooms in October 2023, Van Rootselaar wrote: "I had a complete break from reality and did a lot of irrational things, I felt like I was dreaming. Many consequences ensued." She claimed in 2023 to be treating ADHD and OCD with antidepressant and antipsychotic drugs.

Van Rootselaar had a history of poor mental health. Police had responded to mental health-related calls several times previously, including multiple cases of hospitalization under the province's Mental Health Act. In 2023, Van Rootselaar "spent weeks receiving treatment in Prince George". The police had last visited the home in spring 2025 regarding mental health issues, including self-harm.

== Investigation ==
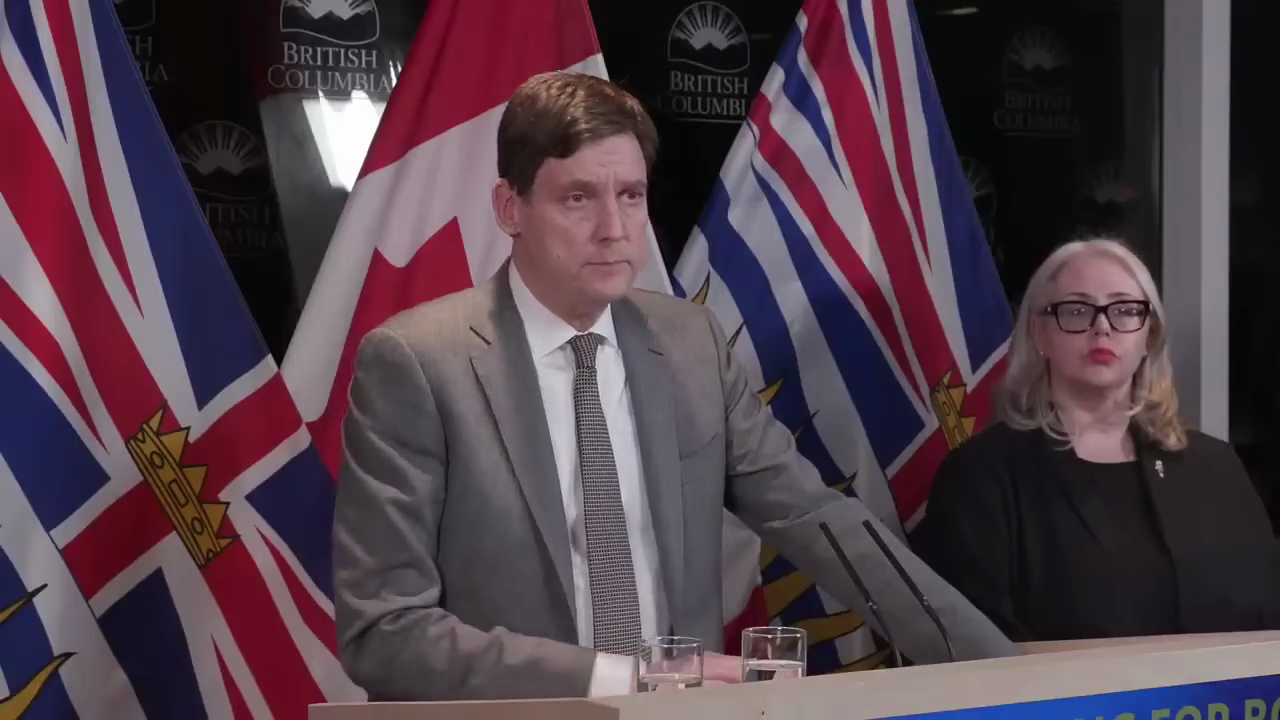
Premier David Eby and Minister of Public Safety and Solicitor General Nina Krieger at a press conference the day of the shooting

RCMP superintendent Ken Floyd stated at a press conference the day of the shooting that they were investigating how the shooter was connected to the victims. McDonald said in a February 11 press conference that police believed that Van Rootselaar had acted alone, and that they had not found a note or other communication from the shooter. Police recovered a long gun and a modified rifle from the school. The RCMP expected to have completed their investigation at the residence on the weekend of February 14, but noted that the forensic investigation at the secondary school will take "much longer".

On February 13, McDonald said that two firearms were recovered at the school. The "main firearm believed to be the one that caused the most damage" at the school is of an unknown origin, having never been seized by the RCMP, as is the shotgun found at the residence. He also stated that "there was no specific targeting of ... any individuals" at the school, but that the perpetrator was "for lack of a better term, hunting ... engaging anybody and everybody they could come in contact with".

On April 29, families of the victims filed a lawsuit against OpenAI. On September 2, thirty more lawsuits were filed on behalf of the victims.

In September 2026, the province of British Columbia sued OpenAI and its CEO, Sam Altman, in the U.S. District Court for the Northern District of California, alleging that the Tumbler Ridge school shooting could have been prevented. The lawsuit stated that the shooter had used ChatGPT to plan the attack and that OpenAI's safety team had flagged her conversations in June 2025 and recommended contacting law enforcement, but company leadership, including Altman, overruled the recommendation.

=== Arrest of co-conspirator ===
On the morning of October 6, 2026, the acting U.S. Attorney in Seattle announced that a 30-year-old man from Bellingham, Washington named James Cody Bryant had been arrested "on a charge of conspiracy to murder in the Tumbler Ridge mass shooting," and that the defendant would make an initial appearance in court that day. Prosecutors allege that he "aided and encouraged Jesse Van Rootselaar by providing advice, money and agreeing to broadcast the attack."

According to the US criminal complaint, Jesse Van Rootselaar and Bryant met on the random-pairing video chat app Omegle in 2023, and "discussed preparation and co-ordination relating to the [Tumbler Ridge] shooting in Discord direct messages from November 2025 to Feb. 10, 2026." Bryant allegedly "tried to talk Van Rootselaar out of doing the attack. But ultimately, Bryant did not contact law enforcement and agreed to handle the livestreaming just minutes before the attack."

On October 13, 2026, Bryant was denied bail by a judge in Seattle. In her ruling, Magistrate Judge Mary Alice Theiler "described Bryant as having "serious mental health concerns" and substance abuse problems. In court filings, prosecutors alleged that Bryant had sent a PayPal payment to Van Rootselaar "to purchase a lighter to ignite an explosive device constructed for use in the attack." They also alleged that one day before the attack, Van Rootselaar told Bryant that "she didn't want to carry out the shooting if she didn't 'know for certain' someone would livestream it."

== Reactions ==
Several Canadian politicians released statements offering their condolences to those affected by the shootings, including Prime Minister Mark Carney, Governor General Mary Simon, BC premier David Eby, Prince George—Peace River—Northern Rockies MP Bob Zimmer, and Peace River South MLA Larry Neufeld. Carney cancelled his imminent trip to the 62nd Munich Security Conference in Europe, and announced that flags would be flown at half-mast on federal buildings and Parliament Hill for seven days. King Charles III of Canada and the Canadian Olympic Committee also expressed their condolences. At the time of the shooting, the Canadian team was competing in the 2026 Winter Olympics. Immediately following the shootings, BC Minister of Public Safety and Solicitor General Nina Krieger declared that her office would "deploy every resource" to support the investigation.

After the shooting, Tumbler Ridge councillor Chris Norbury described Tumbler Ridge as "an incredibly safe community", stating that "we don't have to worry about crime here." Tumbler Ridge mayor Darryl Krakowka said: "I will know every victim. I've been here 19 years, and we're a small community." On February 12, two days after the shootings, the Prime Minister's Office stated that Carney intended to visit Tumbler Ridge in the coming days, and that an appropriate schedule was being arranged with local officials. Carney extended invitations to other federal party leaders to travel with him to the community on February 13. Conservative Party leader Pierre Poilievre, Bloc Québécois leader Yves-François Blanchet, interim NDP leader Don Davies, and Green Party leader Elizabeth May confirmed that they would travel with the prime minister to attend.

On February 13 while at a vigil, Eby promised families that students would not be forced to return to the high school. The Canadian Press reported that the superintendent of the Peace River South school district said that the "expectation is that students will not be returning" to the secondary school. On February 16, the school announced that students would be returning to school in "portable facilities" and will have trauma experts on site.

United Nations secretary-general António Guterres expressed his deepest sympathies to those affected and his solidarity with the government and people of Canada.

=== Misinformation ===
Both before and after the perpetrator was revealed to be transgender, unsubstantiated claims and misinformation about violence by transgender people were shared online. Additionally, numerous social media posts and news sources showed photos of a trans woman in Ontario who had the same last name as Van Rootselaar but had no involvement in the shooting. The Ontarian stated that her photos were incorrectly used as photos of the shooter. Her mother said she became "afraid to go outside".

== See also ==
- List of mass shootings in Canada
- List of school shootings in Canada
