= Pouce Coupe (disambiguation) =

Pouce Coupe (French: "cut- thumb") may refer to a number of places named for a Beaver Indian Chief called Pouscapee:

- Pouce Coupe, a village in British Columbia, Canada
- Pouce Coupe River, a river in Alberta and British Columbia, Canada
- Pouce Coupe Prairie, the southern part of Peace River Country in Alberta and British Columbia, Canada
