= McLeod Elementary School =

McLeod Elementary School may refer to:

- McLeod Elementary School, located in Groundbirch, British Columbia, Canada, part of School District 59 Peace River South
- McLeod Elementary School, located in Jackson, Mississippi, United States, part of the Jackson Public School District
