= Pouce Coupe =

- Village
- The Corporation of the Village of Pouce Coupe
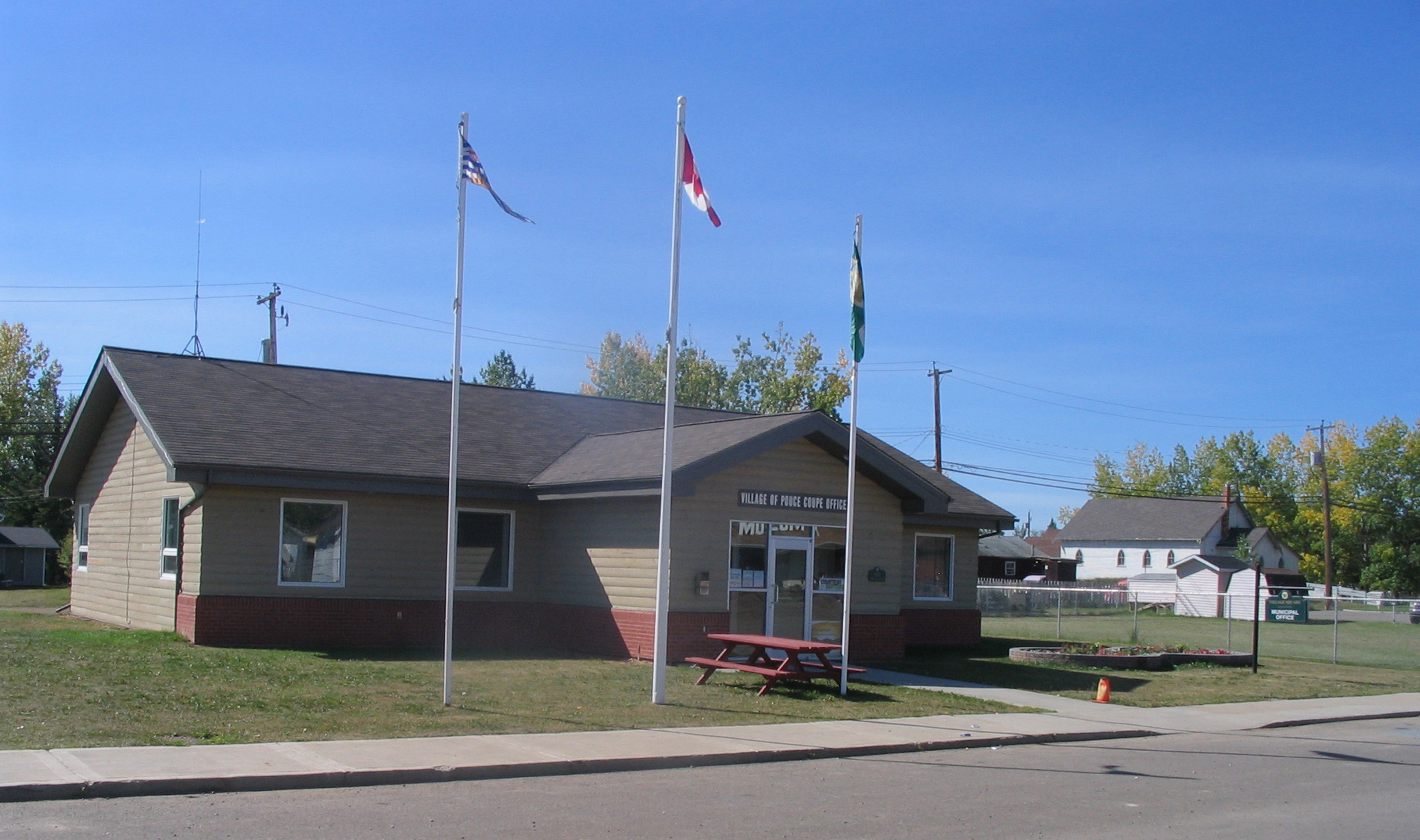
- Pouce Coupe town hall

- Coat of arms

- Location within British Columbia
- Coordinates: 55°42′57″N 120°08′2″W
- Country: Canada
- Province: British Columbia
- Regional District: Peace River
- Incorporated: 5 January 1932 (village)

Government
  - Mayor: Danielle Veach
  - Governing Body: Pouce Coupe Village Council
  - MP: Bob Zimmer
  - MLA: Larry Neufeld

Area
  - Total: 2.06 km^{2} (0.80 sq mi)
- Elevation: 650 m (2,130 ft)

Population (2016)
  - Total: 792
  - Density: 384/km^{2} (996/sq mi)
- Time zone: UTC−7 (Mountain standard)
- Postal code span: V0C 2C0
- Area code: +1-250
- Website: www.poucecoupe.ca

The Village of Pouce Coupe (/ˌpuːs ˈkuːpi/; French for "cut thumb") is a small town in northeastern British Columbia, Canada, and a member municipality of the Peace River Regional District. It was originally named 'Pouskapie's Prairie', after the name of the local native band chief. The 2.06-square-kilometre (0.80 sq mi) municipality is home to 792 residents.

The community was settled by European immigrant Hector Tremblay in 1898. Tremblay, a French speaker, rendered 'Pouskapie's Prairie' into the nearest French words of similar sound. Pouce Coupe is approximately 10 km (6.2 mi) southeast of Dawson Creek along Highway 2. It is approximately 29 km (18 mi) northwest of the Alberta border along Highway 2. The village is at an elevation of 655 metres (2,149 ft) in the Peace River Country.

Pouce Coupe's main industries today are petroleum, agriculture, and tourism. Popular recreational activities in the area include cross-country skiing, snowmobiling, fishing, hiking, and hunting. The village claims to be "the pioneer capital of the Peace Region".

== History ==
While there is debate regarding the origin of the name 'Pouce Coupe', the first known reference to it was in McLeod's Fort Dunvegan Journal, 19806 which identified a Beaver Indian Chief named 'Pooscapee'. The unusual name of 'Cut Thumb' comes from a Sekani trapper named 'Pouce Coupe' because he lost his thumb in an accident with his gun. The region became known as the Pouce Coupe Prairie, from which the river and village took their names. Permanent settlement began after the French-Canadian voyageurs Hector Tremblay and Joe Bissette left their group of prospectors from Kamloops during the Klondike Gold Rush and became the first settlers in the Pouce Coupe Prairie. In 1898 Bissette built his cabin in the present day Pouce Coupe Regional Park at the confluence of Bissette Creek and Pouce Coupé River, but soon moved on to Dunvegan, Alberta. Tremblay, joined by his wife and children in 1908, built his cabin at the confluence of Dawson Creek and Pouce Coupé River. Tremblay used his cabin as a trading post for local aboriginal tribe and resting place for the trickle of travellers that passed through. He also tried ranching cattle and helped cut trails south to Grande Prairie and north to Fort St. John. When the Dominion Government opened the Peace River Block for homesteading, the trails created an influx of settlers between 1912 and 1914. A community began to emerge around Tremblay's cabin as he ran a small store and post office. This also aided inexperienced settlers. This community center moved in 1916 when the post office moved to Frank Haskin's general store and a bank opened nearby.

After World War I homestead grants to returning soldiers created another wave of settlers and the community center moved to its present location in the early 1920s when the post office and other businesses moved to a newly subdivided townsite on Charlie LeRoy's homestead. Until 1932 Pouce Coupe would be the service center for the region. The federal government established an office in the emerging village in 1915 and provincial government followed in 1921. The first school opened in 1917, the Alberta Red Cross opened a hospital in 1921, and the Pouce Coupe Light and Power Co. was established in 1931.

As Northern Alberta Railways was extending their rail lines westward, to Wembley, Alberta in 1924 and to Hythe, Alberta in 1928, it was expected that Pouce Coupe would be next in line. However, as land prices rose and speculation increased, the company made a deal to build the next station near the smaller community of Dawson Creek. The first train went through Pouce Coupe and arrived in Dawson Creek on January 15, 1931. Despite the Great Depression and Dawson Creek's increasing dominance over the region as the westernmost rail connection, Pouce Coupe continued to grow, and incorporated as a village, as westward migration into the Peace River Country continued.

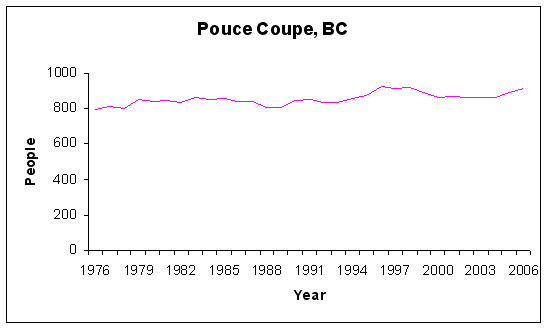
Population trend 1976–2006, BC Stats

The 1941 census recorded 251 people living in the village. In 1942 the population swelled, as the US Army unloaded thousands of men and construction material in nearby Dawson Creek to build the Alaska Highway. The highway was built and the US Army gone within a year but by 1951 the population that remained numbered 459 residents. The village was connected to drinking water and sewage system in 1950, and a natural gas in 1954. In large part because of the Women's Institute a library opened in 1951 and a new hospital in 1954. In the following decades the village would remain in the shadow of Dawson Creek as the provincial and federal government offices moved there in the 1970s. The population level fluctuated between 800 and 930 people since then with the peak occurring in 1996 at 928 people. In 2007, a large boundary extension northward over agricultural land neary doubled the area of the village and brought its borders within metres of the City of Dawson Creek's.

== Demographics ==
Canada 2001 Census
	Pouce Coupe	British Columbia
Median age	39.6 years	38.4 years
Under 15 years old	20%	18%
Between 25 and 44 years old	26%	30%
Over 65 years old	23%	14%
Visible minority	2.8%	21%
Protestant	31%	31%
No religious affiliation	41%	37%

In the 2021 Census of Population conducted by Statistics Canada, Pouce Coupe had a population of 762 living in 317 of its 345 total private dwellings, a change of −3.8% from its 2016 population of 792. With a land area of 2.06 km^{2} (0.80 sq mi), it had a population density of 369.9/km^{2} (958.0/sq mi) in 2021.

According to the 2001 Canadian census, 31% of Pouce Coupe's population were married couples with children, 20% were married couples without children, and 29% were one-person households. Of 190 reported families, 63% were married couples (average 3.2 persons per family) and 21% were lone parents (3.0 persons per family). Residents of the village were slightly older than the provincial average, but with a federally subsidized 60-bed care home located in the village a much greater proportion of residents were seniors. Widows comprised 16% of residents over 20 years old, higher than the provincial average of 6%. With 10% of Pouce Coupe residents being foreign-born, and 94% with an English-only mother tongue, the village has few visible minorities. While not counted as visible minorities during the census, 145 people considered themselves to have an Aboriginal identity, five times the provincial 4% average. The census found that over 85% of the housing stock was owned, while only 15% was rented, while provincially 67% was owned and 33% rented.

Historical populations
Year	Pop.	±%
2001	833	—
2006	739	−11.3%
2011	738	−0.1%
2016	792	+7.3%

== Infrastructure ==
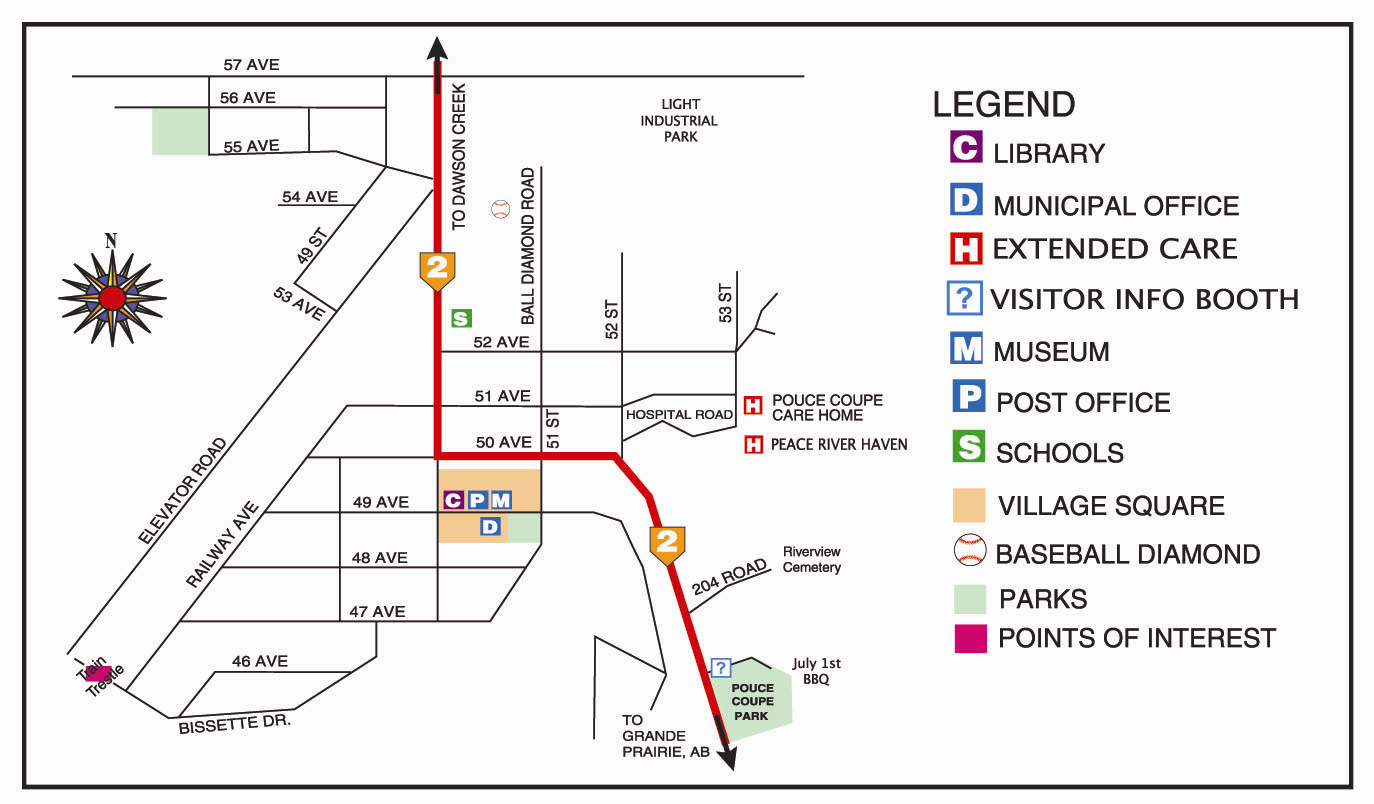
Map of the village

Highway 2 runs north–south through Pouce Coupe, connecting the town to Dawson Creek (10 km (6.2 mi) northwest) and Alberta (29 km (18 mi) southeast). Pouce Coupe's internal street network has 14 km (8.7 mi) of paved and 5 km (3.1 mi) of unpaved road. The village's commercial activities are centered on the bend in highway. The residential areas are located mostly south of the highway with a gridiron layout. Industry is located north of the highway and agriculture to the west.

Pouce Coupe does not have rail, air, and bus services within its borders but uses those services as they are available in Dawson Creek. The rail line actually goes through Pouce Coupe, through the north beside by the highway and southwestern corner, but does not stop. The next place the train stops, after leaving Dawson Creek and going south through Pouce Coupe, is in Hythe, Alberta. Pouce Coupe is serviced by the Dawson Creek Airport which is located in the southeastern corner of the Dawson Creek municipal borders. The airport was built in 1963 and had its 1,524 m (5,000 ft) runway paved in 1966. Regional bus service, as offered by Greyhound Bus Lines, is accessed through Dawson Creek.

The Village's drinking water is supplied by the City of Dawson Creek. The water is drawn from the Kiskatinaw River 16 km west of the city and pumped through a booster pump station, a settling pond, a storage pond and a water treatment plant where it is chlorinated. The Village's sewage is collected by 7 kilometres (4.3 mi) of sanitary sewers and processed through a two-cell lagoon system. Electricity is provided by BC Hydro and natural gas by Pacific Northern Gas.

== Geography and climate ==
Weather
Time	Temperature	Precipitation
January	−14 °C (7 °F)	3.0 cm (1.2 in)
July	14 °C (57 °F)	5.6 cm (2.2 in)
Average annual precipitation : 45.5 cm (17.9 in)
Source: Weatherbase

Pouce Coupe is located in the western portion of the Peace River Country amidst the Pouce Coupe Prairie. It is in the B.C. Peace Lowland ecosection of the Canadian Boreal Plains ecozone. The village slopes southeastwards towards the confluence of Bissette Creek, which flows along its southern border, and Pouce Coupe River which flows northward along its eastern border. Deer, elk, moose are common. The general area, located in the Cordillera Climatic Region, has a subhumid low boreal ecoclimate and experiences a cool continental climate, with an average annual temperature of 1.4 °C (34.5 °F) and snowfall of 170.7 cm (67.2 in). The summers are warm and dry resulting from Pacific air masses that lose much of their moisture going through a number of mountain ranges. The winters are frigid from exposure to the Arctic air masses, however, the village experiences heavy winds year round. Because it experiences long daylight hours in summer and short daylight hours in winter, the village uses Mountain Standard Time year-round.

== Economy and education ==
Economy
Rate	Village	Province
Unemployment rate	15.0%	8.5%
Participation rate	56.6%	65.2%
Poverty rate	20.8%	17.8%
Average male income	$50,721	$50,191
Average female income	$24,181	$35,895
Source: Canada 2001 Census

The 2001 Canadian census recorded 315 income-earners over the age of 15 residing in Pouce Coupe; of these, 110 worked full-time throughout the year. The village has both higher unemployment and poverty rates and lower participation rate than the provincial averages. The low participation rate reflects the relatively old population which consists of retired rural farmers and residents. Being a retirement destination, the two largest employers in Pouce Coupe in 2005 were two healthcare homes. Industrial business is concentrated in the highway and oil & gas field construction and servicing. Being only about 10 km from Dawson Creek's downtown and industrial park, residents commute to the larger city for employment, shopping and services. The 2001 Census estimated that only 3% of people in Pouce Coupe between 20 and 64 years old graduated from a university, a fraction of the 24% provincial average and 40% did not graduate from secondary school, double the provincial average.

The only school in the village is the Pouce Coupe Elementary School. It has the capacity for 450 students but the enrollment has decreased from 148 to 99 students between 2001 and 2006. A study by the Fraser Institute found that the elementary school had one of the worst academic performances in the province in 2004. The village elects one school board trustee, for representation on School District 59. Pouce Coupe students commute to South Peace Secondary School in Dawson Creek for high school education. Northern Lights College, also in Dawson Creek, is the closest post-secondary school.

== Culture, recreation and media ==
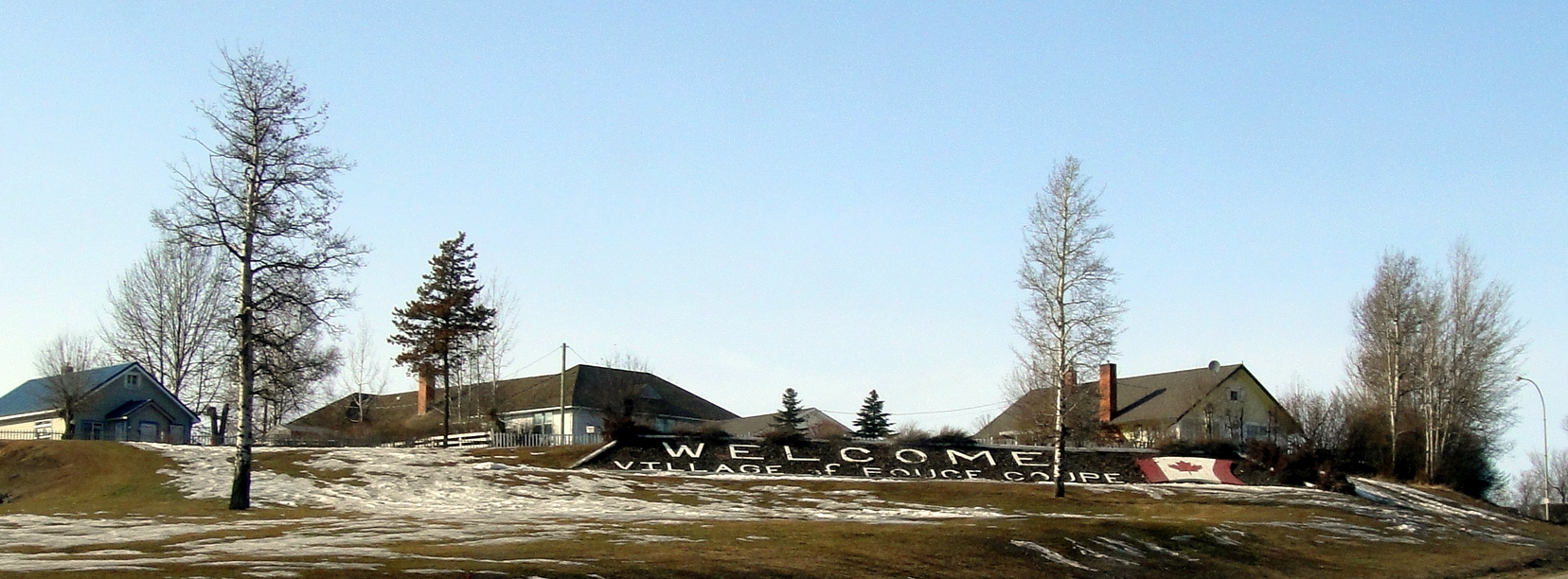
Welcome sign

Other than an annual Canada Day parade and festival, there are few cultural or recreational events within the village. No newspapers or television/radio stations operate within the village but the Peace River Block Daily News and CJDC-TV include Pouce Coupe in their coverage. The municipality operates the Pouce Coupe Municipal Library and two parks: Village Square and Harden Park. The South Peace Community Multiplex, located between the city and the village and partly funded by the village, was scheduled to open in 2007 and contain an aquatic centre with an Olympic-sized swimming pool, an indoor equestrian centre, and an indoor running track. The Peace River Regional District manages the Pouce Coupe Regional Park, on the southern border of the municipality, which has an amphitheatre and camping spots. Nearby provincial parks include the Sudeten Provincial Park, Swan Lake Provincial Park, and One Island Lake Provincial Park all to the south. Bear Mountain, to the west, has a downhill ski complex and an extensive trail system used for motorized and non-motorized recreation. With Dawson Creek so close, many Pouce Coupe residents use cultural and recreational facilities there.

== Government and politics ==
The Village of Pouce Coupe's council-manager form of municipal government is headed by a mayor (who also represents Pouce Coupe on the Peace River Regional District's governing board) and a four-member council; these positions are subject to at-large elections every three years. The mayor's chair is currently vacant due to the resignation in September 2013 of Larry Fynn for health reasons. Fynn was elected in November 2011, defeating incumbent mayor Lyman Clark, who in turn defeated incumbent mayor Barb Smith in 2008. Smith had defeated Sandy Hull, who was acting-mayor since the death of mayor Doyle McNabb in April 2005. The village funds and administers a sewerage system, a volunteer fire department, a library, parks, a cemetery, street lights, and roads except the highway.

Pouce Coupe is part of the Peace River South provincial electoral district, represented by Blair Lekstrom in the Legislative Assembly of British Columbia. In the 2001 provincial election, he was elected as the district's Member of the Legislative Assembly with 57% support from the city's polls and re-elected in 2005 with 50% support. Before Lekstrom, Peace River South was represented by Jack Weisgerber. Weisgerber represented the riding between 1986 and 2001 as a member of the Social Credit Party of British Columbia, which made him Minister of Energy, Mines and Petroleum Resources and Minister of Native Affairs before becoming party leader between 1992 and 1993. In 1996 as leader of the Reform Party of British Columbia, Weisgerber won re-election even though Pouce Coupe polls put him in third place behind the losing BC Liberal Party and New Democratic Party candidates.

Federally, Pouce Coupe is located in the Prince George—Peace River riding, represented in the House of Commons of Canada by Conservative Party Member of Parliament Bob Zimmer. Prior to Zimmer, the village was represented by Conservative Party member Jay Hill, who was first elected in 1993. Before Hill, the riding was represented by former Chetwynd mayor Frank Oberle of the Progressive Conservative Party who served as Minister of Science and Technology and later as Minister of Forestry.

Canadian federal election 2011: Pouce Coupe polls in Prince George—Peace River
Party	Candidate	Votes	city %	riding %
Conservative	Bob Zimmer	372	71%	62%
New Democratic	Lois Boone	99	19%	26%
Green	Hilary Crowley	31	5.9%	6.0%
Liberal	Ben Levine	16	3.1%	5.2%
Pirate	Jeremy Cote	5	1.0%	1.1%
Turnout		524	53%	54%

2009 British Columbia general election Pouce Coupe polls in Peace River South
Party	Candidate	Votes	town %	riding %
Liberal	Blair Lekstrom	135	57%	63%
NDP	Pat Shaw	66	28%	27%
Green	Grant Fraser	20	8.4%	6.7%
Independent	Donna Young	16	6.7%	2.9%
Turnout		237	43%	44%
