= List of school shootings in Canada =

This chronological list of school shootings in Canada includes any school shootings in Canada that occurred at primary and secondary public or private schools, as well as colleges and universities, and on school buses. A "school shooting" is defined by this list as any discharge of a firearm on school grounds while students and staff are present for educational activities. Excluded from this list are the following:

1. Incidents that occurred during wars
2. Incidents that occurred as a result of police actions
3. Suicides or suicide attempts involving only one person

Shootings by school staff are covered. This list does not include other types of attacks, such as stabbings or bombings.

== 19th century ==
Date	Location	Region	Dead	Injured	Total	Description
August 25, 1884	Markdale	Ontario	1 (Note: Including the perpetrator or suspect)	1	2	28-year-old school director William Norris wounded a teacher before killing himself.

== 20th century ==
Date	Location	Region	Dead	Injured	Total	Description
April 28, 1902	Frontenac County	Ontario	1	0	1	14-year-old Eric Sharp shot and killed 14-year-old Beatrice Holland at a school. He was charged with manslaughter.
October 9, 1902	Altona	Manitoba	2	5	7	A teacher opened fire on his students at a Mennonite school, killing two and wounding five before fatally shooting himself.
October 11, 1939	Proton Township	Ontario	0	0	0	A 25-year-old man fired a rifle into the door of a school.
January 28, 1944	near Moose Jaw	Saskatchewan	0	0	0	Someone fired a rifle into the Newberry school as a dance occurred.
October 27, 1944	Hamilton	Ontario	0	0	0	A 12-year-old student at Memorial School accidentally fired a gun in a classroom.
September 15, 1947	Longueuil	Quebec	0	1	1	9-year-old Robert Robinson was shot in the thigh by a caretaker at St. Joseph's School.
February 1954	Toronto	Ontario	0	2	2	Two students were wounded when a revolver was fired in a classroom at Central Technical School.
March 16, 1959	Edmonton	Alberta	1	5	6	A 19-year-old former student opened fire in a hallway at Ross Sheppard High School, killing a student and wounding five others.
September 28, 1960	Tilbury	Ontario	0	1	1	A teacher was shot and beaten over the head by an attacker with a rifle while grading papers in a rural schoolhouse. A farmer was arrested the following month and charged with wounding with intent to do grave body harm.
August 20, 1968	Calgary	Alberta	1	0	1	17-year-old Jonathon Charles Wilson killed janitor Robert Sawyer with a rifle at William Aberhart High School.
November 21, 1972	Boucherville	Quebec	1	2	3	15-year-old Lionel Barbeau shot and wounded a teacher in the parking lot of École Polyvalente de Mortagne, then injured a classmate in a nearby wooded area before killing himself.
May 28, 1975	Brampton	Ontario	3	13	16	Brampton Centennial Secondary School shooting: 16-year-old Michael Slobodian killed a teacher and student at Brampton Centennial Secondary School and wounded thirteen other people before killing himself.
June 27, 1975	Dauphin	Manitoba	0	0	0	A 14-year-old student fired a shotgun inside a restroom at McKenzie Junior High School.
October 1, 1975	Montreal	Quebec	2	0	2	A bank robber commandeered a school bus and shot and killed a 6-year-old student before being killed by police as he exited the bus.
October 27, 1975	Ottawa	Ontario	3	5	8	St. Pius X High School shooting: After stabbing a neighbour to death at his home, 18-year-old Robert Poulin shot six other students of St. Pius X High School, killing one, before killing himself.
December 7, 1977	Hudson Bay	Saskatchewan	0	6	6	A 15-year-old fired a rifle at a passing school bus, wounding the driver and injuring five students with metal fragments.
October 19, 1978	Winnipeg	Manitoba	1	0	1	A student shot and killed another student, Ken Maitland, at Sturgeon Creek Collegiate.
October 15, 1982	Vaughan	Ontario	0	2	2	An 18-year-old student shouted at two schoolmates outside Woodbridge High School, then wounded them both with a shotgun. The shooting was motivated by a love triangle.
December 21, 1982	Cedar	British Columbia	0	0	0	Multiple shots were fired into Woodbank Elementary School as the school custodian was inside.
March 25, 1986	Etobicoke	Ontario	0	1	1	55-year-old Frank Kieczor, a Richview Collegiate Institute teacher, was shot by a 16-year-old student in a classroom.
January 29, 1987	Metcalfe	Ontario	0	0	0	A 15-year-old student at Osgoode Township High School fired a revolver several times in an area reserved for smoking outside the school.
November 16, 1987	Estevan	Saskatchewan	0	0	0	A student opened fire with a rifle at Estevan Junior High School before surrendering to police. No one was shot.
December 7, 1987	Oakville	Ontario	0	0	0	A .22-calibre bullet struck a window at White Oaks Secondary School, nearly hitting a teacher. An 18-year-old suspect was arrested.
March 8, 1989	Lévis	Quebec	0	0	0	Two rifle rounds struck a school bus carrying 50 students.
October 10, 1989	Toronto	Ontario	0	1	1	A 29-year-old adult education student was shot in the shoulder and wounded in a restroom at Downsview Secondary School. A 27-year-old man was arrested.
October 31, 1989	Toronto	Ontario	0	0	0	A gunman fired a shot at Weston Collegiate Institute principal Larry Rogers as Rogers chased him and his accomplices off school property.
December 6, 1989	Montreal	Quebec	15	14	29	École Polytechnique massacre: 25-year-old Marc Lépine targeted female students as he opened fire at École Polytechnique de Montréal, killing fourteen students and wounding fourteen other people before killing himself.
February 26, 1990	Burlington	Ontario	0	4	4	A 17-year-old student opened fire inside a hallway at General Brock High School, wounding his ex-girlfriend, her new boyfriend, and a bystander. A teacher was grazed. The shooter fled, but was arrested soon after.
January 15, 1991	Trochu	Alberta	0	0	0	A 14-year-old fired a handgun in the hallways and gymnasium of Trochu Valley School before being arrested. No one was shot.
January 15, 1991	Churchill	Manitoba	0	0	0	A 15-year-old fired a shotgun in a school hallway, hitting no one.
April 8, 1991	Toronto	Ontario	0	0	0	A teenager fired a shot into a door at C. W. Jefferys Collegiate Institute.
June 20, 1991	Richmond	British Columbia	1	1	2	40-year-old Roland Paquette was killed and another man was wounded when gang-related assailants fired shots at workers constructing an addition to James Thompson Elementary School as the school was in session.
September 16, 1991	Toronto	Ontario	0	0	0	A teenager fired multiple shots outside Harbord Collegiate Institute during a fight.
October 8, 1991	Nanaimo	British Columbia	0	0	0	A teenager fired a gun in the parking lot of Woodlands Secondary School, hitting no one. The shooter was arrested at another school.
August 24, 1992	Montreal	Quebec	4	1	5	Concordia University massacre: Professor Valery Fabrikant killed four colleagues and wounded another at Concordia University.
April 2, 1993	Scarborough	Ontario	0	0	0	A gunman fired a handgun twice in the foyer of W. A. Porter Collegiate Institute.
June 3, 1993	Vancouver	British Columbia	0	1	1	A shooter fired from a car at students outside Gladstone Secondary School, wounding a male student.
September 3, 1993	Calgary	Alberta	0	0	0	A shot was fired at Forest Lawn High School during an altercation.
October 20, 1994	Toronto	Ontario	0	2	2	27-year-old student Ta Phu Cuong opened fire with a rifle at Brockton High School, wounding two faculty members. He was arrested nearby.
January 24, 1997	Langley	British Columbia	0	2	2	Two Langley Secondary School students were wounded in the back of the building in a drive-by shooting.
March 13, 1997	Calgary	Alberta	0	0	0	An 18-year-old man fired a gun twice inside Viscount Bennett High School.
May 8, 1998	Toronto	Ontario	0	2	2	A man fired shots outside Thorncliffe Park Elementary School, wounding two people.
February 8, 1999	Montreal	Quebec	0	0	0	A handgun was fired into a school door at Woodland Elementary School in Verdun.
April 28, 1999	Taber	Alberta	1	1	2	W. R. Myers High School shooting: A 14-year-old former student shot and killed a 17-year-old student and wounded another person at W. R. Myers High School.
February 10, 2000	Toronto	Ontario	0	3	3	Three Emery Collegiate Institute students were shot in the school's parking lot at dismissal.

== 21st century ==
Date	Location	Region	Dead	Injured	Total	Description
January 2002	Ajax	Ontario	0	0	0	A 16-year-old fired a shot in the lobby of Pickering High School.
March 18, 2002	North West River	Newfoundland and Labrador	0	0	0	A student fired a rifle in a classroom at Lake Melville School during show-and-tell, hitting no one.
April 22, 2003	Florenceville-Bristol	New Brunswick	0	0	0	A student was arrested after he fired multiple shots in the schoolyard of Carleton North High School.
December 10, 2004	Brampton	Ontario	1	0	1	62-year-old Erhun Candir killed his wife, 47-year-old teacher Aysegul Candir, in the parking lot of Bramalea Secondary School.
February 25, 2005	Salluit	Quebec	1	1	2	An 18-year-old man shot and wounded a teacher at an adult education centre before killing himself.
November 9, 2005	Brampton	Ontario	0	1	1	An 18-year-old man was shot in his car in the parking lot of Chinguacousy Secondary School.
June 5, 2006	Williams Lake	British Columbia	0	0	0	A student fired a gun on a school bus as he was being driven to school. The student and his friends convinced other occupants the gunshot was harmless and went to school still possessing the firearm. The school's vice-principal subdued the teenager at school and confiscated the firearm.
September 13, 2006	Montreal	Quebec	2	19	21	2006 Dawson College shooting: A non-student parked his car outside Dawson College and opened fire outside and inside the school, killing a woman and wounding nineteen other people. The shooter committed suicide after being shot by a police officer.
October 4, 2006	Toronto	Ontario	0	2	2	Two men were wounded in the parking lot of Burnhamthorpe Collegiate Institute.
April 5, 2007	Toronto	Ontario	1	0	1	An 18-year-old man was shot and killed in the driveway of Burnhamthorpe Collegiate Institute.
May 23, 2007	Toronto	Ontario	1	0	1	15-year-old Jordan Manners was shot and killed by two 17-year-olds at C. W. Jefferys Collegiate Institute.
June 11, 2007	Vaughan	Ontario	0	0	0	A jewellery store robber exchanged gunfire with police in a schoolyard seconds after a class ran inside Leo Baeck Day School. The shooter was eventually apprehended, with no casualties sustained.
September 16, 2008	Toronto	Ontario	0	1	1	A 16-year-old was shot during a drug deal gone wrong outside Bendale Business and Technical Institute.
March 24, 2011	Toronto	Ontario	0	1	1	A person was wounded during an altercation when a teenager shot into a car outside Winston Churchill Collegiate Institute.
June 15, 2012	Edmonton	Alberta	3	1	4	University of Alberta shooting: Security guard Travis Baumgartner shot four other employees in a robbery on the University of Alberta campus, killing three of them. He was arrested while attempting to escape to the U.S.
April 5, 2013	Gatineau	Quebec	2	0	2	Robert Charron entered the daycare of the Les Racines de vie Montessori and shot and killed worker Neil Gaillou before killing himself.
January 22, 2016	La Loche	Saskatchewan	5	6	11	La Loche shootings: 17-year-old Randan Fontaine shot and killed two of his cousins at a home before going to La Loche Community School and killing three people and wounding six others.
September 12, 2018	Toronto	Ontario	0	1	1	During a fight at the Scarborough Centre, a school for adult learners, a man pulled out a gun and shot at another man, grazing him, before fleeing.
February 5, 2020	Toronto	Ontario	0	0	0	A gunman fired into an occupied vehicle in the parking lot of Cedarbrae Collegiate Institute, striking nobody.
February 14, 2022	Toronto	Ontario	1	0	1	18-year-old Jahiem Robinson was shot and killed and another 18-year-old was assaulted at David and Mary Thomson College Institute. A 14-year-old was arrested.
May 12, 2022	Toronto	Ontario	0	1	1	A Grade 11 student was shot in the south parking lot of Victoria Park Collegiate Institute.
October 31, 2022	Toronto	Ontario	1	1	2	18-year-old Jefferson Peter Shardeley Guerrier was killed and a 15-year-old wounded in a shooting outside Woburn Collegiate Institute.
February 16, 2023	Toronto	Ontario	0	1	1	A 15-year-old boy was critically wounded by gunfire in the parking lot of Weston Collegiate Institute. Two 17-year-olds were arrested.
June 2, 2024	Toronto	Ontario	2	3	5	Two gunmen exited a truck and shot into a group of people outside North Albion Collegiate Institute, killing two men and wounding three other people.
September 9, 2024	Toronto	Ontario	0	1	1	A 16-year-old boy was grazed by gunfire in the parking lot of Agincourt Collegiate Institute.
December 10, 2024	Toronto	Ontario	0	0	0	A gun was discharged in a stairwell at Silverthorn Collegiate Institute.
December 23, 2025	Toronto	Ontario	1	0	1	20-year-old Shivank Avasthi was shot and killed on a campus trail at the University of Toronto Scarborough. Police believe it was a random attack.
February 10, 2026	Tumbler Ridge	British Columbia	9	27	36	2026 Tumbler Ridge shooting: A shooting occurred at Tumbler Ridge Secondary School. A former student killed eight people and wounded 27 others before killing herself. Two of the dead were killed in a private home.
April 10, 2026	Sarnia	Ontario	1	2	3	20-year-old Dane Nisbet was killed and two other men were injured in a shooting in the patio area of Lambton College's campus bar. No suspects were arrested.

== See also ==
- List of mass shootings in Canada
- Lists of school-related attacks
