= Chetwynd Secondary School =

Location
- 5000 46th St. Chetwynd, British Columbia, V0C 1J0; Canada
- 55°41′46.45″N 121°36′50.15″W

Information
- School type: Public, high school
- School board: School District 59 Peace River South
- Principal: Chris Mason
- Staff: 28
- Grades: 8-12
- Enrollment: 300 (approx.) (January 16, 2006)
- Colours: Blue, Black, White
- Mascot: Cavalier
- Website: css.sd59.bc.ca

Chetwynd Secondary School (or CSS) is a public high school in Chetwynd, British Columbia, Canada. CSS is operated by School District 59 Peace River South and is the designated secondary school for the three local primary schools in Chetwynd. The school building is attached to Windrem Elementary School and shares French Immersion teachers with that school. Dual credit courses are offered in partnership with Northern Lights College.

In addition to core academic subjects, CSS offers courses in (partial list only):

- Automotive
- First Nations studies
- Business studies
- Business computer applications
- Cafeteria training
- Carpentry & cabinet making
- Digital media
- Drama
- Food studies
- Journalism
- Law
- Mechanics
- Theatre performance
- Woodwork

Athletic programs include a Hockey Academy and Junior Rodeo.

CSS is a participant in the school district's International Student Study Program.

CSS was the subject of a study by the University of Lethbridge, "Grief and loss lives in schools: Chetwynd Secondary School : a case study."
