= Pouce Coupe River =

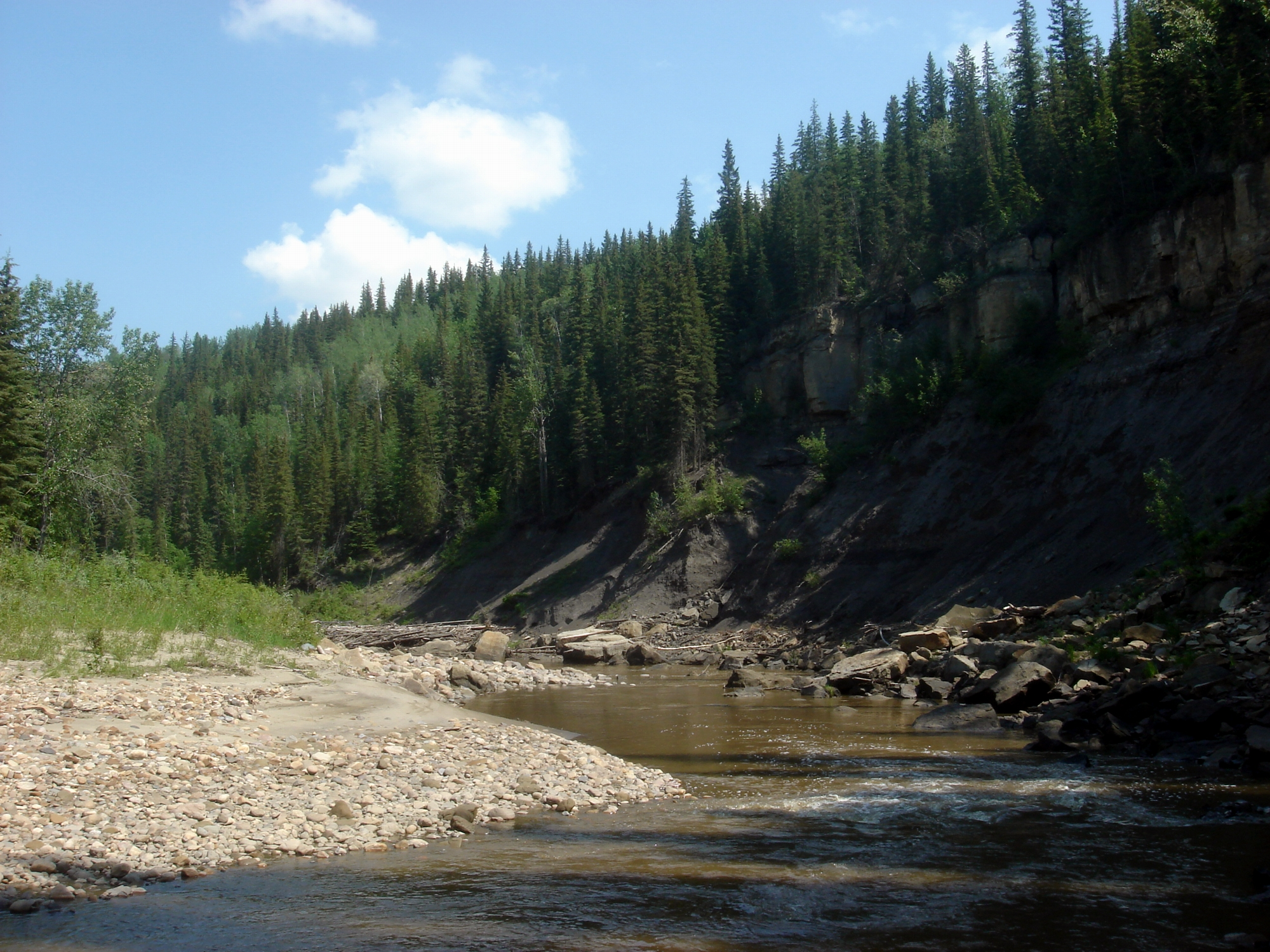
- Pouce Coupe River canyon after the confluence with Saskatoon Creek

Location
- Country: Canada

Physical characteristics
- Source
  - location: Saddle Hills County, Alberta
  - elevation: 860 m (2,820 ft)
- Mouth
  - location: Peace River
  - coordinates: 56.13158°N 119.91116°W
  - elevation: 380 m (1,250 ft)

The Pouce Coupe River is a major tributary of the Peace River in Alberta and British Columbia, Canada. Its name is officially spelled Pouce Coupé River, but it is commonly written without the acute accent.

Originating in Alberta's Saddle Hills County, it flows into British Columbia's Peace River Regional District, then returns in Alberta in Saddle Hill County, where it empties into the Peace River.

The region of Pouce Coupe Prairie, from which the river and village of Pouce Coupe take their names, was called that for a Beaver Indian Chief named 'Pouscapee'. The first European settler in the region was Hector Tremblay, who built a cabin there in 1898. Tremblay, of French origin, translated 'Pouskapee's Prairie' into the nearest French words of similar sound (pouce coupé, meaning "cut thumb" or "cut-off thumb").

== Course ==
The Pouce Coupe originates in a small lake in northern Alberta, at an elevation of 860 metres (2,820 ft), in the Pouce Coupe Prairie of the southern Peace River Country, west of Spirit River and Woking, between Saddle Hills and Blueberry Hill. It flows west and receives the waters of Boone Creek before reaching the British Columbia–Alberta border.

The river then turns northwest to the village of Pouce Coupe. The Pouce Coupe Regional Park is established on the banks of the river east of the village and Highway2, at the confluence with Bissette Creek.

It receives the waters of Dawson Creek east of the city of Dawson Creek, then turns northeast, entering once again the province of Alberta, north of Highway 49. The course runs through a canyon that reaches depths of 220 metres (720 ft) in this section. Ammonite fossils harvested from the geological formations opened in the canyon can be found in the Dawson Creek Northern Alberta Railways Park museum. The river continues north and empties into the Peace River, south of Highway 64, at an elevation of 380 metres (1,250 ft).

== Tributaries and crossings ==
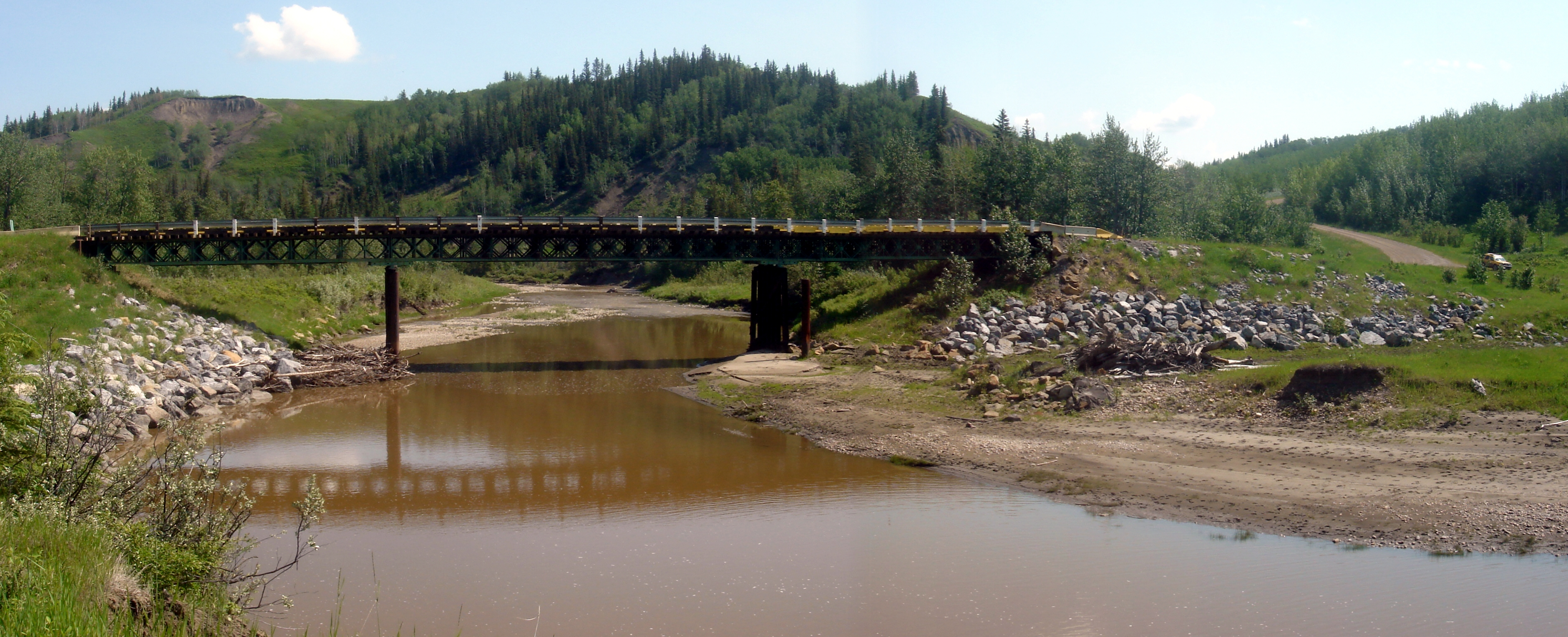
Landry road bridge

From its origin to its mouth, Pouce Coupe River encounters the following tributaries and crossings:

Tributary/crossings	Location	Remarks
Unnamed Lake	55.67064°N 119.34843°W	Origin
Forestry Road	55.67594°N 119.68626°W	Bridge
Boone Creek	55.66680°N 119.88655°W	From South, left tributary
Tupper River	55.66897°N 120.03426°W	From South, left tributary
British Columbia border	55.66334°N 120.00092°W	
Bissette Creek	55.71124°N 120.12232°W	From West, left tributary
Pouce Coupe Regional Park	55.71168°N 120.12303°W	Camping
Briar Ridge Road	55.71318°N 120.12156°W	Bridge
Dawson Creek	55.74090°N 120.11801°W	From West, left tributary
Highway 49	55.75138°N 120.10638°W	Bridge
Henderson Creek	55.84762°N 120.01283°W	From East, right tributary
Landry Road	55.86501°N 120.03057°W	Bridge
Saskatoon Creek	55.86964°N 120.03057°W	From West, left tributary
Alberta border	55.88106°N 120.00027°W	
Doe Creek	55.99577°N 119.89380°W	From West, left tributary
Broche Creek	55.99808°N 119.88461°W	From East, right tributary
Peace River	56.13158°N 119.91116°W	Mouth

== See also ==
- List of rivers of British Columbia
- List of rivers of Alberta
