= Dawson Creek =

- City
- City of Dawson Creek
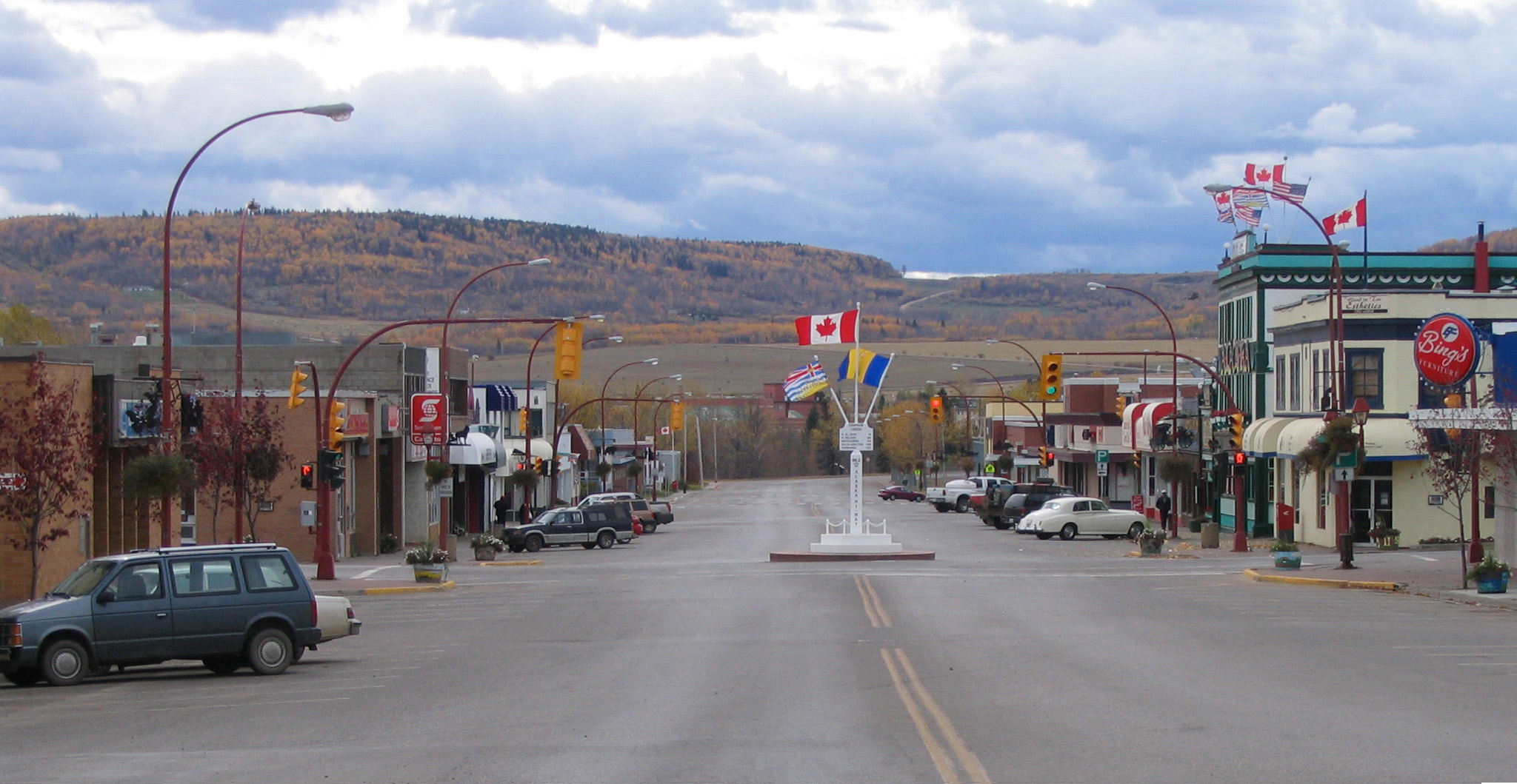
- Looking south into downtown Dawson Creek, with the Mile "0" post

- Flag

- Location of Dawson Creek Dawson Creek (Canada) Dawson Creek (North America)
- Coordinates (City Hall): 55°45′38″N 120°14′08″W
- Country: Canada
- Province: British Columbia
- Regional district: Peace River
- Incorporated: May 26, 1936 (village); January 6, 1958 (city)

Government
  - Type: City
  - Mayor: Darcy Dober
  - MP: Bob Zimmer (Conservative)
  - MLA: Larry Neufeld (Conservative)

Area
  - Total: 26.72 km^{2} (10.32 sq mi)
- Elevation: 665 m (2,182 ft)

Population (2021)
  - Total: 12,323
  - Density: 461.2/km^{2} (1,194/sq mi)
- Time zone: UTC−07:00 (MST)
- Forward sortation area: V1G
- Area codes: 250, 778, 236, 672
- Highways: Highway 2; Highway 49; Highway 97
- Website: www.dawsoncreek.ca

Dawson Creek is a city in northeastern British Columbia, Canada. The municipality of 24.37 square kilometres (9.41 sq mi) had a population of 12,978 in 2016. Dawson Creek derives its name from the creek of the same name that runs through the community. The creek was named after George Mercer Dawson by a member of his land survey team when they passed through the area in August 1879. Once a small farming community, Dawson Creek became a regional centre after the western terminus of the Northern Alberta Railways was extended there in 1932. The community grew rapidly in 1942 as the US Army used the rail terminus as a transshipment point during construction of the Alaska Highway. In the 1950s, the city was connected to the interior of British Columbia via a highway and a railway through the Rocky Mountains. Since the 1960s, growth has slowed, but the area population has increased.

Dawson Creek is located in the dry and windy prairie land of the Peace River Country. As the seat of the Peace River Regional District and a service centre for the rural areas south of the Peace River, the city has been called the "Capital of the Peace". It is also known as the "Mile 0 City", referring to its location at the southern end of the Alaska Highway. It also has a heritage interpretation village, an art gallery, and a museum. Annual events include a fall fair and rodeo.

== History ==
Dawson Creek is named after the watercourse of the same name, itself named after George Mercer Dawson who led a surveying team through the area in August 1879; a member of the team labelled the creek with Dawson's name. The community that formed by the creek was one of many farming communities established by European-Canadian settlers moving west through the Peace River Country. When the Canadian government began issuing homestead grants to settlers under the Dominion Lands Act in 1912, the pace of migration increased. With the opening of a few stores and hotels in 1919 and the incorporation of the Dawson Creek Co-operative Union on May 28, 1921, Dawson Creek became a dominant business centre in the area. After much speculation by land owners and investors, the Northern Alberta Railways built its western terminus 3 km (2 mi) from Dawson Creek. The golden spike was driven on December 29, 1930, and the first passenger train arrived on January 15, 1931. The arrival of the railway and the construction of grain elevators attracted more settlers and business to the settlement. The need to provide services for the rapidly growing community led Dawson Creek to incorporate as a village in May 1936. A small wave of refugees from the Sudetenland settled in the area in 1939 as World War II was beginning. The community exceeded 500 people in 1941.

Upon entering the war, the United States decided to build a transportation corridor to connect the US mainland to Alaska. In 1942, thousands of US Army personnel, engineers, and contractors poured into the city – the terminal of rail transport – to construct the Alaska Highway. The highway was completed in less than a year; even after the workers involved in its construction departed, population and economic growth continued. In February 1943, a major fire and explosion in a livery barn, packed with road-building supplies including dynamite, caused serious damage to the centre of town; five people were killed and 150 injured. Dawson Creek became a RCAF station during WWII, in September 1944. The station disbanded in March 1946.

The former Dawson Creek city logo, retired in 2002

By 1951, Dawson Creek had more than 3,500 residents. In 1952, the John Hart Highway linked the town to the rest of the British Columbia Interior and Lower Mainland through the Rocky Mountains; a new southbound route, known locally as Tupper Highway, made the town a crossroads with neighbouring Alberta. The next year, western Canada's largest propane gas plant was built and federal government offices were established in town. In 1958, the extension of the Pacific Great Eastern Railway to the Peace from Prince George was completed, and the village was re-incorporated as a city. Between 1951 and 1961, the population of Dawson Creek more than tripled. The RCAF centre re-emerged on October 1, 1956, and was declared functional in 1958. It was disbanded a final time in March 1964.

Growth slowed in the 1960s, with the population reaching its all-time high in 1966, but area population increased. In the 1970s, the provincial government moved its regional offices from Pouce Coupe to the city, Northern Lights College opened a Dawson Creek campus, and the Dawson Creek Mall was constructed. Several modern grain elevators were built, and the town's five wooden grain elevators, nicknamed "Elevator Row", were taken out of service. Only one of the historic elevators remains, converted to an art gallery. Since the 1970s, with the nearby town of Fort St. John attracting much of the area's industrial development and Grande Prairie becoming a commercial hub, the town's population and economy have not significantly increased.

Since 1992, the city has undergone several boundary expansions. One expansion incorporated undeveloped land in the southeast for an industrial park and a Louisiana-Pacific Canada veneer factory. The city extended sewer and water lines to the location; however, the area was not developed and with the factory only half-built, L-P Canada abandoned its plans. A business making manufactured homes bought the factory and completed its development in 2005. Another expansion incorporated the existing oriented strand board factory in the northwest corner of the city, while further incorporations have included undeveloped land to the south and north.

== Demographics ==
Historical population
Year	Pop.	±%
1941	518	—
1951	3,589	+592.9%
1961	10,946	+205.0%
1981	11,373	+3.9%
1991	10,981	−3.4%
1996	11,125	+1.3%
2001	10,754	−3.3%
2006	10,994	+2.2%
2011	11,583	+5.4%
2016	12,178	+5.1%

Canada 2016 Census
	Dawson Creek	British Columbia
Median age	34 years	43 years
Under 15 years old	19%	15%
Over 65 years old	13%	18%
Visible minority	10%	30%

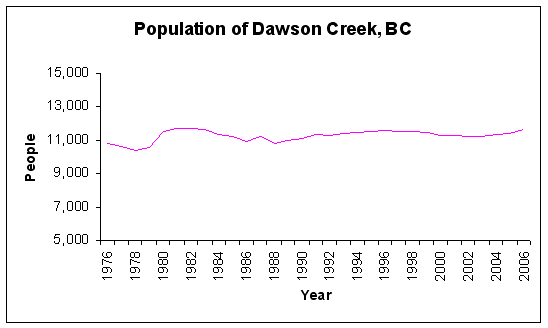
Population, 1976–2006

In the 2021 Census of Population conducted by Statistics Canada, Dawson Creek had a population of 12,323 living in 5,405 of its 6,189 total private dwellings, a change of 1.2% from its 2016 population of 12,178. With a land area of 26.72 km^{2} (10.32 sq mi) it had a population density of 461.2/km^{2} (1,194.5/sq mi) in 2021.

The 1941 census, the first to include Dawson Creek as a defined subdivision, counted 518 residents. Its growth spurred by the construction of the Alaska Highway, the town recorded a sevenfold increase to 3,589 residents in the 1951 census. Within five years, the population more than doubled to 7,531. New transport links with southern British Columbia and Alberta spurred continued growth into the next decade.

The population peaked in 1966 at 12,392, then declined throughout the 1970s, rising again briefly during the construction of the nearby town of Tumbler Ridge in the early 1980s. Dawson Creek's population has remained relatively stable since then. Between 2005 and 2009, the population rose from 10,869 to 11,514, per provincial estimates.

According to the 2016 Canadian census, there was an average household size of 2.3 persons, similar to the provincial average of 2.4 persons. One-person households made up 32% of total households, slightly above the 29% average provincewide, leaving the average family size to be 2.9 persons.

The median age decreased from 38.8 years in 2001 to 34.4 in 2016 with 53% of those over 15 years of age being married (or common law), lower than the 58% provincial average. Only 46% of residents over 15 years old had a post-secondary certificate (including degree, diploma and trades certificate), compared to the provincewide rate of 55%. Among those aged 25–64, 17% did not have a high school certificate or equivalent, higher than the 10% provincewide rate.

=== Ethnicity ===
As of the 2016 Canadian census, nearly 16% of the city's population belong to an Aboriginal group (Métis or First Nations) with an additional 10% belonging to a Visible minority group (primarily Filipino and South Asian).

Panethnic groups in the City of Dawson Creek (1996−2021)
Panethnic group	2021		2016		2011		2006		2001		1996	
Panethnic group	Pop.	%	Pop.	%	Pop.	%	Pop.	%	Pop.	%	Pop.	%
European (Note: Statistic includes all persons that did not make up part of a visible minority or an indigenous identity.)	8,605	71.29%	8,705	73.87%	8,995	79.99%	9,175	83.94%	8,965	83.9%	9,745	88.07%
Indigenous	1,835	15.2%	1,925	16.33%	1,645	14.63%	1,470	13.45%	1,425	13.34%	1,040	9.4%
Southeast Asian (Note: Statistic includes total responses of "Filipino" and "Southeast Asian" under visible minority section on census.)	840	6.96%	505	4.29%	135	1.2%	100	0.91%	120	1.12%	105	0.95%
South Asian	450	3.73%	340	2.89%	320	2.85%	55	0.5%	30	0.28%	35	0.32%
African	125	1.04%	150	1.27%	30	0.27%	25	0.23%	65	0.61%	30	0.27%
East Asian (Note: Statistic includes total responses of "Chinese", "Korean", and "Japanese" under visible minority section on census.)	125	1.04%	60	0.51%	80	0.71%	70	0.64%	40	0.37%	55	0.5%
Latin American	40	0.33%	40	0.34%	35	0.31%	10	0.09%	25	0.23%	45	0.41%
Middle Eastern (Note: Statistic includes total responses of "West Asian" and "Arab" under visible minority section on census.)	25	0.21%	45	0.38%	0	0%	10	0.09%	0	0%	10	0.09%
Other/multiracial (Note: Statistic includes total responses of "Visible minority, n.i.e." and "Multiple visible minorities" under visible minority section on census.)	35	0.29%	25	0.21%	0	0%	20	0.18%	20	0.19%	20	0.18%
Total responses	12,070	97.95%	11,785	96.77%	11,245	97.08%	10,930	99.42%	10,685	99.36%	11,065	99.46%
Total population	12,323	100%	12,178	100%	11,583	100%	10,994	100%	10,754	100%	11,125	100%
Note: Totals greater than 100% due to multiple origin responses.

=== Religion ===
According to the 2021 census, religious groups in Dawson Creek included:

- Irreligion (7,170 persons or 59.4%)
- Christianity (4,385 persons or 36.3%)
- Sikhism (205 persons or 1.7%)
- Hinduism (80 persons or 0.7%)
- Buddhism (45 persons or 0.4%)
- Islam (40 persons or 0.3%)
- Judaism (10 persons or 0.1%)
- Indigenous Spirituality (10 persons or 0.1%)

== Geography ==
At the foot of Bear Mountain ridge, the city developed around the Dawson Creek watercourse which flows eastward into the Pouce Coupe River. The city is located on the Pouce Coupe Prairie in the southwestern part of the Peace River Country, 72 km (44.7 mi) southeast of Fort St. John, and 134 km (83.3 mi) northwest of Grande Prairie, Alberta. According to the Canada Land Inventory, the city is on soil that has moderate limitations, due to an adverse climate, that restrict the range of crops or require moderate conservation practices. The land is flat, but slopes upwards in the northeastern corner elevating a residential area over the rest of the city.

The city is in the British Columbia Peace Lowland ecosection of the Canadian Boreal Plains ecozone on the continental Interior Platform. Located in the Cordillera Climatic Region, it lies at the southern end of a subarctic climate (Köppen Dfc). In the summer, the city is often dusty and arid; temperatures during the day are warm, but cool at night, typically falling below 10 °C (50 °F). Highs reaching 30 °C (86 °F) occur only twice per year on average. Heavy rain showers are sporadic, lasting only a few minutes. In the winter, the city can get bitterly cold and dry, with 17 to 18 days of −30 °C (−22 °F) lows per year. It is subject to very strong winds year round. Unlike most of the province, the city and its region use Mountain Standard Time (UTC−07:00) all year round, since the area already has long daylight hours in the summer and short daylight hours in the winter. In other words, residents of the region never change their clocks – Pacific Daylight Time is used during the spring, summer and early fall, and Mountain Standard Time during the late fall and winter.

=== Climate ===
Dawson Creek has a subarctic climate (Köppen Dfc), bordering on a warm-summer humid continental climate (Köppen Dfb) due to its short summers. Summers are generally warm and rainy with cool nights and low humidity. Winters are very cold, some of the coldest in British Columbia with moderate snowfall. Winter is the longest season, lasting from the end of October to the beginning of April. Summer is typically two to three months, from June through August. Spring and Autumn are usually short seasons, lasting one to two months in length. A freeze has been recorded for every month of the year including all the summer months. Precipitation peaks during July, likely due to thunderstorm activity.

The hottest recorded temperature, 38.9 °C (102.0 °F), was set on June 29, 2021. The record high daily minimum was 18.9 °C (66.0 °F) recorded June 29, 2021. The record highest dew point was 22.4 °C (72.3 °F) recorded June 30, 2021. The most humid month was August 1989 with an average dew point of 11.4 °C (52.5 °F). The warmest month was August 1981 with an average monthly mean temperature of 20.1 °C (68.2 °F). August 2022 set the record for the month with the highest average monthly daily maximum of 26.6 °C (79.9 °F), and July 2024 for the highest average monthly daily minimum of 11.2 °C (52.2 °F). August 1998 set a record of no maximum temperature below 19.2 °C (66.6 °F) for the entire month; July 2020 with no temperature below C and no dew point below 5.2 °C (41.4 °F).

The lowest yearly maximum dew point is 14.0 °C (57.2 °F) recorded in 2003. The lowest yearly maximum daily minimum temperature is 12.2 °C (54.0 °F) recorded in 1974. The lowest yearly maximum temperature is 25.6 °C (78.1 °F) recorded in 1976.

The average yearly maximum dew point is 17.1 °C (62.8 °F) and the average yearly maximum daily minimum temperature is 15.3 °C (59.5 °F).

Dawson Creek

Climate chart (precipitation, max. and min. temperature)
J	F	M	A	M	J	J	A	S	O	N	D
28 −8 −19	19 −4 −16	22 0 −11	19 10 −3	32 17 2	57 20 7	80 23 9	49 22 7	38 17 4	27 9 −2	29 0 −11	22 −5 −16
- █ Average max. and min. temperatures in °C
- █ Precipitation totals in mm
- Source: Environment Canada
Imperial conversion
J	F	M	A	M	J	J	A	S	O	N	D
1.1 18 −3	0.8 26 4	0.9 33 11	0.8 49 26	1.3 62 36	2.2 69 45	3.1 73 49	1.9 71 45	1.5 62 38	1.1 49 28	1.1 31 12	0.9 23 3
- █ Average max. and min. temperatures in °F
- █ Precipitation totals in inches

Climate data for Dawson Creek Airport
Month	Jan	Feb	Mar	Apr	May	Jun	Jul	Aug	Sep	Oct	Nov	Dec	Year
Record high humidex	16.3	14.7	18.1	28.9	31.6	33.8	39.2	36.3	33.8	27.4	19.7	12.9	39.2
Record high °C (°F)	16.6 (61.9)	15.5 (59.9)	20.9 (69.6)	29.5 (85.1)	32.2 (90.0)	38.9 (102.0)	36.2 (97.2)	34.5 (94.1)	32.0 (89.6)	27.7 (81.9)	18.9 (66.0)	13.8 (56.8)	38.9 (102.0)
Mean maximum °C (°F)	8.8 (47.8)	8.5 (47.3)	11.5 (52.7)	19.6 (67.3)	26.1 (79.0)	27.3 (81.1)	29.7 (85.5)	29.2 (84.6)	26.2 (79.2)	20.3 (68.5)	10.4 (50.7)	7.6 (45.7)	31.1 (88.0)
Mean daily maximum °C (°F)	−7.6 (18.3)	−3.6 (25.5)	0.3 (32.5)	9.6 (49.3)	16.6 (61.9)	20.3 (68.5)	22.5 (72.5)	21.7 (71.1)	16.7 (62.1)	9.2 (48.6)	−0.4 (31.3)	−5.2 (22.6)	8.3 (46.9)
Daily mean °C (°F)	−13.5 (7.7)	−9.7 (14.5)	−5.6 (21.9)	3.2 (37.8)	9.4 (48.9)	13.8 (56.8)	15.9 (60.6)	14.5 (58.1)	10.1 (50.2)	3.5 (38.3)	−5.8 (21.6)	−10.8 (12.6)	2.1 (35.8)
Mean daily minimum °C (°F)	−19.4 (−2.9)	−15.8 (3.6)	−11.4 (11.5)	−3.2 (26.2)	2.2 (36.0)	7.2 (45.0)	9.2 (48.6)	7.3 (45.1)	3.6 (38.5)	−2.2 (28.0)	−11.2 (11.8)	−16.3 (2.7)	−4.2 (24.4)
Mean minimum °C (°F)	−36.9 (−34.4)	−31.4 (−24.5)	−29.3 (−20.7)	−15.0 (5.0)	−6.7 (19.9)	0.3 (32.5)	3.2 (37.8)	0.4 (32.7)	−5.1 (22.8)	−13.8 (7.2)	−26.5 (−15.7)	−32.4 (−26.3)	−40.7 (−41.3)
Record low °C (°F)	−48.3 (−54.9)	−45.0 (−49.0)	−44.4 (−47.9)	−31.4 (−24.5)	−13.8 (7.2)	−5.0 (23.0)	−1.7 (28.9)	−7.1 (19.2)	−16.7 (1.9)	−30.9 (−23.6)	−39.8 (−39.6)	−49.2 (−56.6)	−49.2 (−56.6)
Record low wind chill	−57.5	−53.2	−51.1	−33.5	−16.6	−7.4	0.0	−5.4	−15.3	−37.6	−55.4	−54.5	−57.5
Average precipitation mm (inches)	27.7 (1.09)	19.4 (0.76)	21.6 (0.85)	19.3 (0.76)	32.2 (1.27)	57.0 (2.24)	79.6 (3.13)	49.3 (1.94)	38.3 (1.51)	26.8 (1.06)	28.6 (1.13)	21.6 (0.85)	421.3 (16.59)
Average rainfall mm (inches)	1.1 (0.04)	0.6 (0.02)	0.9 (0.04)	7.9 (0.31)	28.2 (1.11)	60.7 (2.39)	84.1 (3.31)	51.3 (2.02)	35.8 (1.41)	12.6 (0.50)	5.0 (0.20)	0.6 (0.02)	288.6 (11.36)
Average snowfall cm (inches)	33.8 (13.3)	23.4 (9.2)	28.0 (11.0)	13.2 (5.2)	4.4 (1.7)	0.0 (0.0)	0.0 (0.0)	0.0 (0.0)	3.2 (1.3)	14.5 (5.7)	29.4 (11.6)	26.8 (10.6)	176.7 (69.6)
Average precipitation days (≥ 0.2 mm)	10.8	8.4	8.3	7.0	9.5	11.2	14.6	12.0	10.6	9.9	9.9	8.5	120.6
Average rainy days (≥ 0.2 mm)	1.0	0.53	0.88	4.1	9.5	11.4	14.9	12.3	10.4	6.3	2.6	0.44	74.2
Average snowy days (≥ 0.2 cm)	11.1	8.8	8.4	4.1	1.6	0.0	0.06	0.0	1.0	4.3	8.7	8.7	56.7
Average relative humidity (%) (at 3pm)	66.3	61.3	54.7	42.4	39.0	44.3	47.6	47.2	48.8	53.3	66.5	68.7	53.3
Average dew point °C (°F)	−16.7 (1.9)	−14.1 (6.6)	−10.8 (12.6)	−4.7 (23.5)	0.1 (32.2)	5.8 (42.4)	8.6 (47.5)	7.9 (46.2)	3.5 (38.3)	−2.4 (27.7)	−9.9 (14.2)	−15.0 (5.0)	−4.0 (24.8)
Source 1: Environment Canada
Source 2: weatherstats.ca (for dewpoint and monthly&yearly average absolute maximum&minimum temperature)

== Economy ==
Economy (2001)
Rate	City	Province
Unemployment rate	10.3%	8.5%
Participation rate	69.5%	65.2%
Poverty rate	16.5%	17.8%
Average male income	$49,551	$50,191
Average female income	$30,846	$35,895

The economy of Dawson Creek is based on four major industries: agriculture, retail, tourism, and oil and gas. Agriculture has historically been the most important industry to Dawson Creek, as the city is the regional transshipment point for agricultural commodities. The city is surrounded by the Agricultural Land Reserve, where the soil can support livestock and produces consistently good yields of quality grain and grass crops, such as canola, hay, oats, alfalfa, wheat, and sweet clover. The service and retail sector caters to the city's inhabitants, smaller nearby towns, and rural communities. However, there is significant retail leakage to Grande Prairie, the closest major Alberta city, where there is no provincial tax on retail purchases, while British Columbia charges 7%. In 2006, the BC government rejected a proposal to lower the sales tax in the province's border communities to 4%. The problem of leakage has been exacerbated in recent years by the introduction of large-format retail stores into the small city. Residents still cross the border for high-priced items but now also purchase medium- and low-priced items from foreign-owned large-format chain stores.

Dawson Creek has a large tourism industry as Mile "0" of the Alaska Highway. Thousands of people drive on the highway every year, starting in Dawson Creek and ending in Fairbanks, Alaska. The trek is often made with recreational vehicles, sometimes in convoys which gather in the city. In the winter, the hospitality industry caters to workers from the oil patches. Discoveries south of Dawson Creek and higher energy prices have spurred oil and gas activities, which have in turn driven the nearby Fort St. John economy to spill over to the Dawson Creek economy. British Columbia's first wind farm, Bear Mountain Wind Park, was constructed southwest of the city in 2009.

== Transportation and infrastructure ==
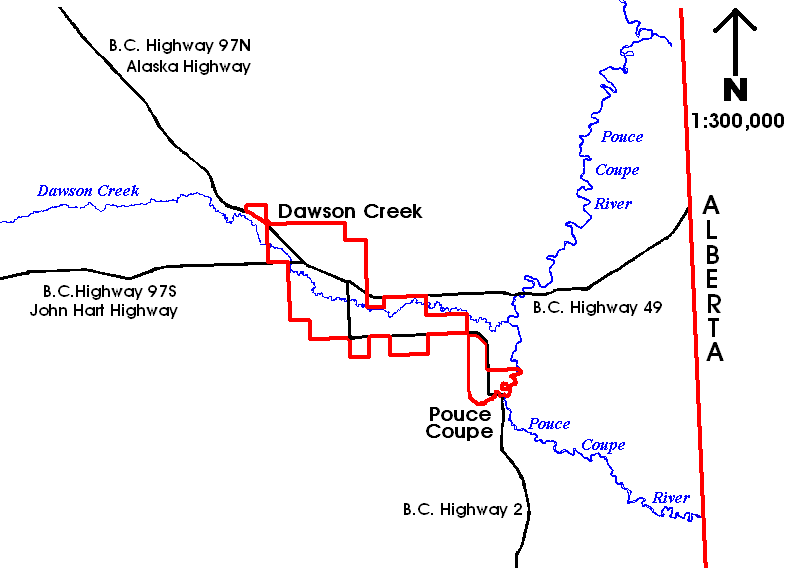
The City of Dawson Creek in relation to the highways and the Dawson Creek watercourse

Dawson Creek's road network was laid out in the mid-20th century as the town rapidly expanded. The city maintains 88 km (55 mi) of paved and 11 km (7 mi) of unpaved roads. The primary roads generally follow a grid pattern around large blocks of land. Because the grid contains many internal intersections with stop signs, traffic is forced onto two arterial roads: 8 Street going north–south and Alaska Avenue going southeast–northwest. These two roads meet at a traffic circle where a metal statue marks the beginning of the Alaska Highway, and the Mile Zero Post is now located. Officially designated British Columbia Highway 97, it runs north from Dawson Creek to Fort St. John and the Yukon – where it becomes Highway 1 – before reaching Alaska. The other highways emanating from Dawson Creek are the John Hart Highway, also 97 (southwest to Chetwynd and Prince George), Highway 2 (south to Grande Prairie and southern Alberta), and Highway 49 (east to Peace River and northern Alberta). A road with few intersections along the southern and western borders of the city, incorporating a stretch of Highway 2, is designated as a "dangerous goods route" for heavy trucks so that they can avoid traveling through the city. However, Highway 49 has no direct access to such a ring road, so many trucks bound to or from the east use the city arterials, slowing traffic and damaging roads.

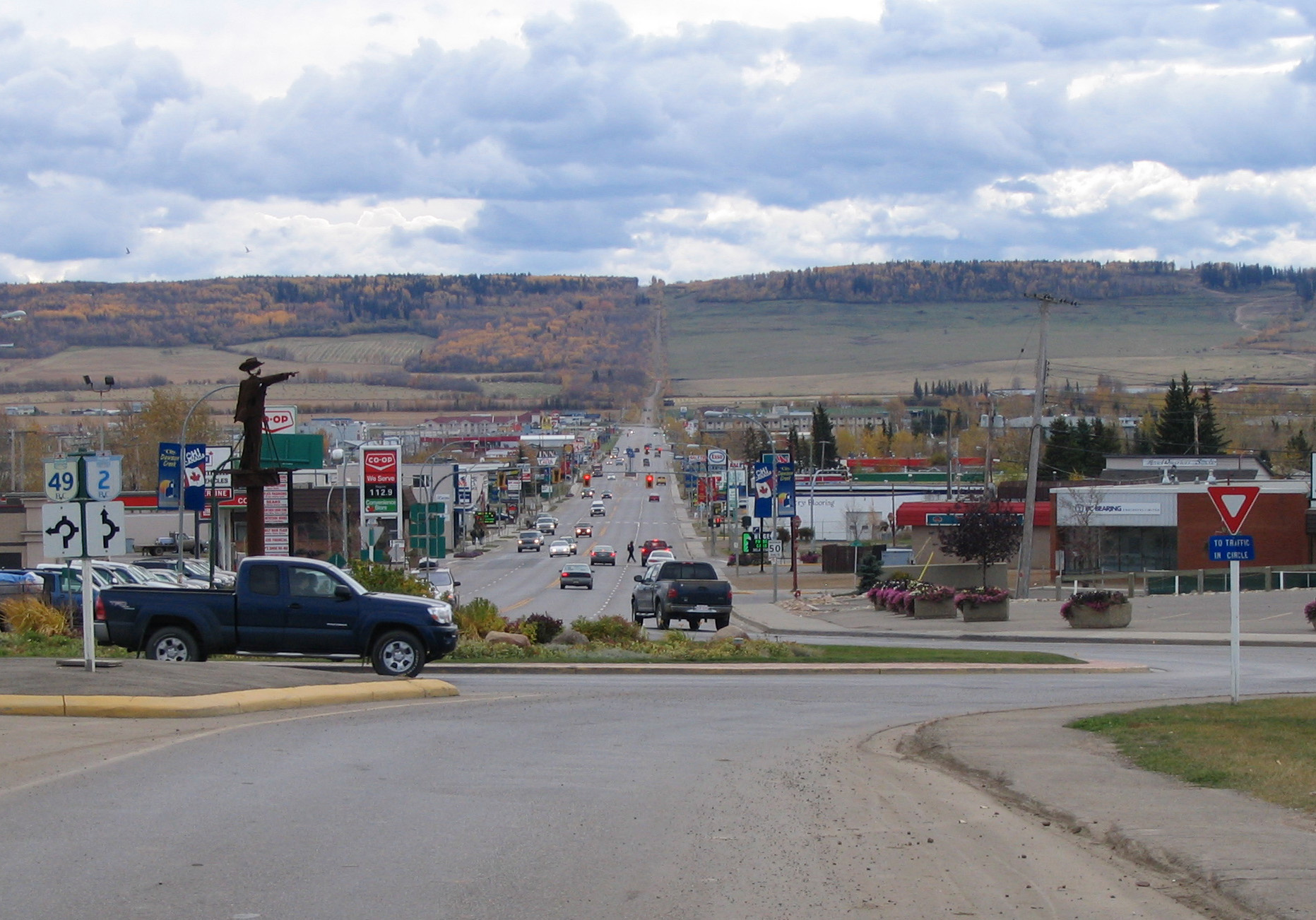
Looking south past traffic circle down 8 Street, with the metal statue pointing the way northwest to Alaska

The Dawson Creek Airport, was built in 1963; its 1,524 m (5,000 ft) runway was paved in 1966. Scheduled services were provided by various airlines over the years, the most recent being WestJet, but as of 2026 there are no commercial flights to the airport. There are larger airports in Fort St. John and Grande Prairie with existing scheduled services.

Passenger rail service was available in Dawson Creek between 1931 and 1974. Service began when the Northern Alberta Railways (NAR) built its northwest terminus in the town and was extended in 1958 to Vancouver with a rail line through the Rocky Mountains. Passenger rail service ended as commodity shipments of grains, oil and gas by-products, and forestry products became more important in the resource-based economy.

The city draws its water supply from the Kiskatinaw River, 18 km (11 mi) west of town. Before reaching the city, the water is pumped through a settling pond, two storage ponds, and a treatment plant where it is flocculated, filtered, and chlorinated. The city also provides drinking water for Pouce Coupe and rural residents. Sewage is processed by a lagoon system east of town and released into the Pouce Coupe River.

== Education ==
Dawson Creek is located in School District 59 Peace River South which maintains four elementary schools (Tremblay, Frank Ross, Crescent Park, and Canalta elementary schools), and one high school (Dawson Creek Secondary School).

Mountain Christian School is two-campus K-12 private school, which moved from its first location nestled in classrooms of a local church after purchasing the former Parkhill Elementary School in 2012 from School District 59. In 2022, MCS acquired the former Ron Pettigrew School (Omega Campus) which now serves as the High School Campus, while the Parkhill school (Alpha Campus) serves as the elementary and junior high campus.

Notre Dame School is the lone Catholic school and serves students from K-7.

Established in 1975, Northern Lights College has a campus in Dawson Creek that houses its Regional Administration and two Centres of Excellence. At Northern Lights College, students can earn a one-year certificate, a two-year diploma or associate degree, or complete upgrading courses to get their high school diploma.

In 2019, the Ron Pettigrew Christian School, a K-12 Christian school affiliated with the Association of Christian Schools International, closed permanently.

== Culture and recreation ==
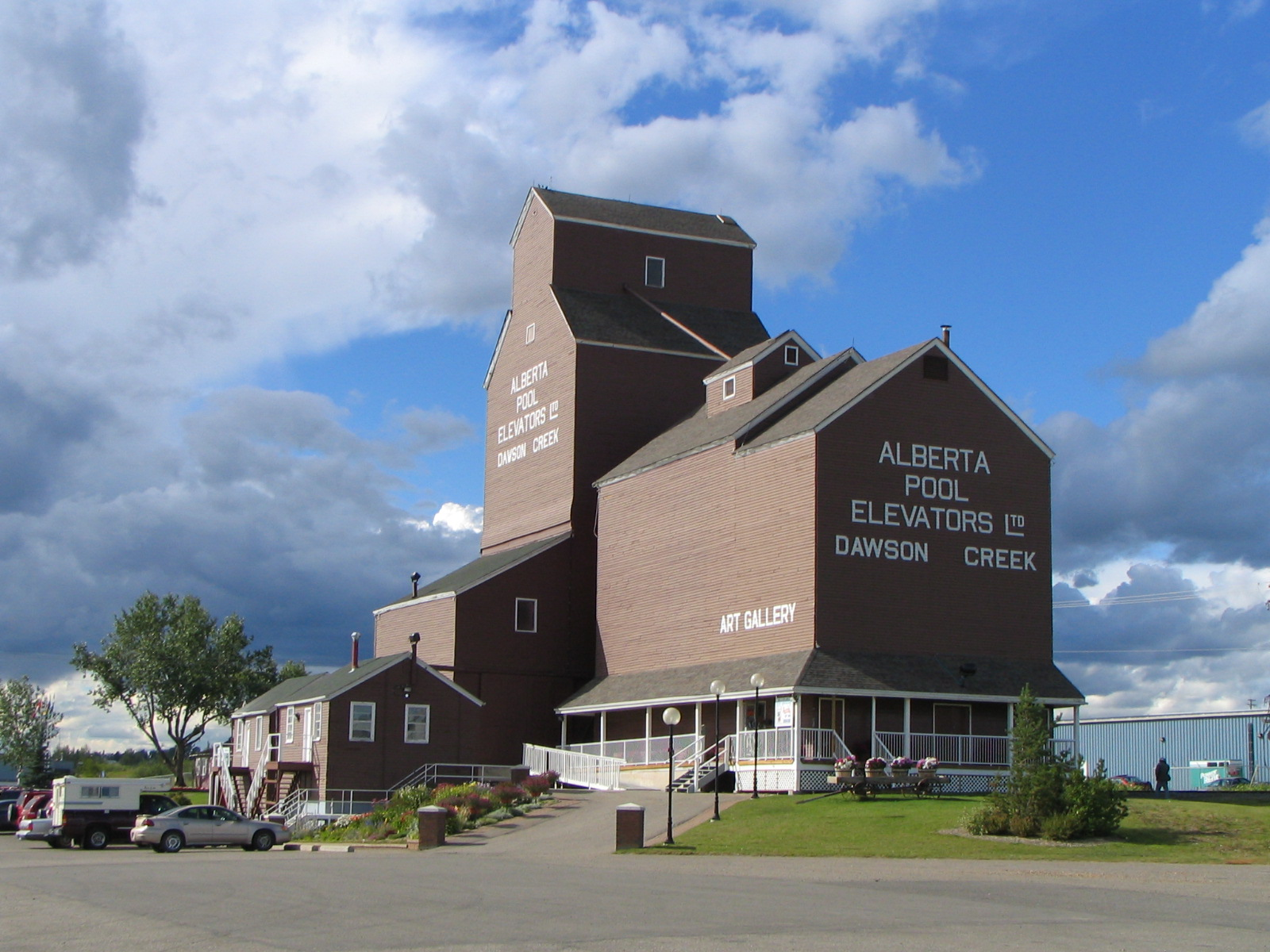
Dawson Creek Art Gallery in NAR Park

The cultural identity of Dawson Creek rests on its designation as Mile "0" of the Alaska Highway. The Mile "0" post, depicted in the city flag, was located at the traffic circle a few blocks to the northeast, but has been relocated to the historic downtown area, one block south of the Northern Alberta Railways Park. The four-acre (1.6 ha), mostly paved NAR Park is the gathering point for travelers. The park includes the Dawson Creek Art Gallery, which exhibits work by local artists and craftsmen. The Station Museum, connected to the art gallery, displays artifacts and exhibits associated with the construction of the NAR railway and the Alaska Highway. Other parks in Dawson Creek include the Mile Zero Rotary Park and the Walter Wright Pioneer Village. Annual events in the city include the Dawson Creek Art Gallery auction, the Dawson Creek Music Festival, Mile Zero Cruisers Show N' Shine classic car show, a stop on the Western Canada RibFest Tour since 2023, and the Peace Country Blue Grass Festival. The largest event, held annually since 1953, is the Dawson Creek Fall Fair & Exhibition — a five-day professional rodeo, with a parade, fairgrounds, and exhibitions.

City recreation facilities include two ice hockey arenas, a curling rink, an indoor swimming pool, an outdoor ice rink, and a speed skating oval (which is now operated by members of the Dawson Creek Speed Skating Club) . The South Peace Community Multiplex, a new facility completed in 2010, boasts a pool, indoor rodeo grounds and ice rink. Voters approved building the Multiplex in a 2004 referendum which projected its cost at C$21.6 million. The project became controversial when construction began and the cost projection was raised to $35 million. The facility is located close to the city's exhibition grounds, away from residential uses. It features an indoor rodeo arena and a 4,000-seat convention centre/ice arena with skyboxes. Nearby Bear Mountain, located south of the city, provides over 20 km (12 mi) of snowshoeing and cross-country skiing trails, as well as areas for downhill skiing and about 500 km (300 mi) of trails for snowmobiles, mountain bikes, and all-terrain vehicles. The city was once home to a North American Hockey League team, the Dawson Creek Rage, beginning in the 2010–11 season until it ceased operations in 2012 due to financial difficulties.

== Media ==
Dawson Creek was served by several regional newspapers. The Dawson Creek Daily News (formerly Peace River Block Daily News) and Fort St. John's Alaska Highway News, both part of the Glacier Ventures chain of local papers, are daily available in the city. The Vault Magazine is a free alternative newspaper available in the city bi-weekly. The Northeast News, a free weekly published in Fort St. John, has a sub-office in Dawson Creek. The Dawson Creek Mirror and The Alaska Highway News both ceased operations in October 2023, since then a small local newsletter is produced weekly named This Week in Dawson Creek

The only radio station broadcasting from the city is 890 CJDC AM, which first went on air in 1947. Originating in Chetwynd, 94.5 Peace FM (CHET) is rebroadcast in Dawson Creek on CHAD-FM 104.1. The Fort St. John stations 95.1 Energy FM (CHRX), 101.5 The Bear FM (CKNL), and 101.1 The Moose FM (CKFU) also reach the city. Also available locally is CBKQ-FM 89.7, repeating CBC Radio One station CBYG-FM from Prince George; and CBUF-FM-7 93.7 FM, repeating Première Chaîne station CBUF-FM from Vancouver.

CJDC-TV, a long-time affiliate of CBC Television before moving to a CTV 2 affiliation in 2016, has been broadcasting from Dawson Creek since 1959. A local community group, the Cable 10 Society, operates a community television station. Dawson Creek is also served by local repeater CFSN-TV channel 8, owned locally by Dawson Creek Hypervista Communications and repeating CTV station CFRN-DT Edmonton in analogue. As of 2016, CBC Television service in the area is maintained only through pay television means.

== Government and politics ==
The City of Dawson Creek has a council-manager form of municipal government. A six-member council, along with one mayor, is elected at-large every four years. Current mayor Darcy Dober assumed the position following an election win over Council member Shaely Wilber in October 2022. Previous mayors of the city have included Dale Bumstead (2013–2023), Mike Bernier (2008–2013), Calvin Kruk (2005–08), Wayne Dahlen (2001–05), Blair Lekstrom (1997–2001), Bill Kusk (1994–96) and Robert Trail (1967–75, 1982–93). The city government administers infrastructure and services such as the provision of drinking water, sewage and garbage collection, fire protection, recreational facilities (including parks, trails and arenas), roadway maintenance, snow removal, library services, street lighting, public transportation, and the airport. The city also partially funds a 22-officer Royal Canadian Mounted Police municipal detachment. For creating its Community Energy Plan, which involved the installation of low-voltage street lights and solar-powered hot water heaters, the city was awarded the Federation of Canadian Municipalities' 2007 Sustainable Community Award. City council appoints one person, usually the mayor, to serve as a board director with the Peace River Regional District. Concurrent with municipal elections, residents also elect two school board trustees to School District 59 which consists of seven trustees.

For representation in the Legislative Assembly of British Columbia, Dawson Creek is situated in the Peace River South provincial electoral district and is represented by Larry Neufeld of the BC Conservative Party. Mike Bernier has served as the Member of the Legislative Assembly since 2013 provincial election until 2024, and prior to that served as mayor of Dawson Creek between 2008 and 2013. His predecessor, Blair Lekstrom, also served as mayor of Dawson Creek between 1996 and 2001 before being elected as the MLA. Before Bernier and Lekstrom, Peace River South was represented by Dawson Creek resident Jack Weisgerber. Weisgerber was first elected in 1986 as a member of the Social Credit Party and served as the province's Minister of Native Affairs for three years. While the Social Credit Party lost power in 1991, Weisgerber was re-elected and served as interim party leader. He joined the Reform Party of British Columbia in 1994 and won re-election in 1996 as party leader, even though Dawson Creek polls put him in third place behind the BC Liberal Party and New Democratic Party candidates.

Federally, Dawson Creek is in the Prince George—Peace River—Northern Rockies riding, represented in the House of Commons of Canada by Conservative Party Member of Parliament Bob Zimmer. Before Zimmer, who was elected in May 2011, the riding was represented by Jay Hill since 1993. The riding was represented by Frank Oberle of the Progressive Conservative Party from 1972 to 1993. Oberle served as Canada's Minister of Science and Technology in 1985 and Minister of Forestry in 1989.

== Notable people ==
- Dan Brennan, ice hockey player
- Donna Feore, choreographer and musical theatre director
- Roy Forbes, singer-songwriter
- Ben Heppner, opera singer / tenor
- Cayden Lindstrom (born 2006), ice hockey player, picked 4th overall in 2024 NHL draft by Columbus Blue Jackets
- Phil Sykes, ice hockey player
- Gary Vandermeulen, international swimmer

== See also ==
- List of cities in British Columbia
