= Ron Pettigrew Christian School =

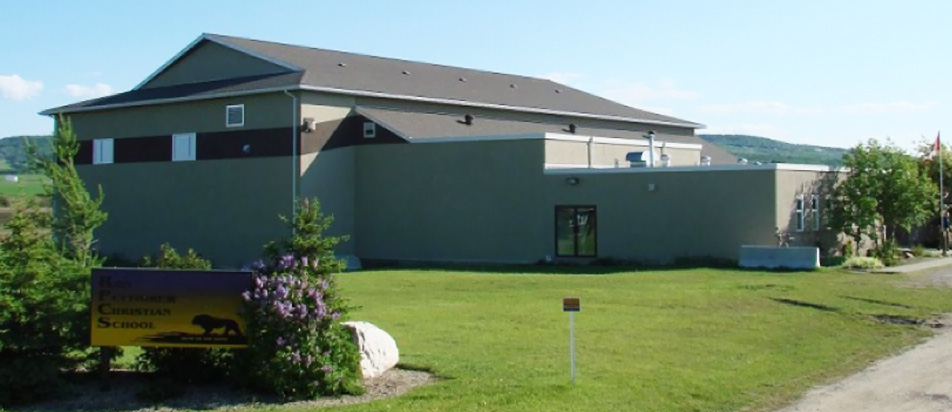

Location
- 1761 110th Avenue; Dawson Creek, British Columbia, V1G 4X4; Canada; 55.7494°N 120.2532°W

Information
- School type: Christian School
- Founded: 1989
- Superintendent: Dianne Tower
- Grades: Kindergarten - Grade 12
- Enrollment: 50 (2018 - 2019)
- Language: English
- Colours: Purple, Gold, and Black
- Team name: Lions
- Website: www.rpschool.ca

Ron Pettigrew Christian School (RPCS) was an accredited, K-12 Christian school in Dawson Creek, British Columbia. RPCS was affiliated with the ACSI, and uses BC curriculum. It was governed by a board elected by the Dawson Creek Community Christian Education Society. In 2019, the school closed permanently and ceased operations. In 2022, Mountain Christian School expanded moved their high school to the former RPCS building.

== History ==
The school was started in 1989 by a group of parents who wanted a school that was interdenominational. The parents chose the name, Ron Pettigrew, a coach/teacher/principal at Bethel Christian School(now named Mountain Christian School). Ron Pettigrew was killed in a car accident in 1988, along with five members of the senior boys basketball team. Before the accident, the school was known as Bethel Christian School, but in 1989 RPCS moved to its own building. In 1992, it built the facility it currently uses. In 2013-2014 a new playground was added. The updated structure replaced the wooden jungle gym, creating a fun, safe area. In 2019, the school closed permanently and ceased operations. In 2022, Mountain Christian School expanded moved their high school to the former RPCS building.

== Sports ==
In the school's inaugural year (1989-1990), despite not having a gymnasium (a gym was added in 2008), the high-school girls basketball team won the BC provincial championship. They would repeat that victory in 1991 with a record of 31–3. The same girls won the provincial title as Bethel Christian School in 1989. The team played all over Western Canada and made headlines as they "Turned Tragedy Into Inspirational Fire." The members of the team were: Jeanette Bailey, Heather Bailey, Susan Stanley, Allison Casseleman, Christy Wiebe, Danette Blouin, Diane Henderson, Paige Huzel, and Jody Eldridge. The team was coached by John Bailey and Joanne Haukenfrers.

The high school boys basketball team placed second in provincials in 1992, followed by 3rd and 5th-place finishes in the following years. In 2016, the Senior Boys basketball team won BC 1A provincials.
