= British Columbia Highway 49 =

Provincial highway in Peace River Regional District, British Columbia, Canada

Highway 49
- Spirit River Highway; Northern Woods and Water Route
- Highway 49 highlighted in red

Route information
- Maintained by the Ministry of Transportation and Infrastructure
- Length: 15.39 km (9.56 mi)
- Existed: 1975–present

Major junctions
- West end: Highway 2 in Dawson Creek
- East end: Highway 49 (Alberta border)

Location
- Country: Canada
- Province: British Columbia

Highway system
- British Columbia provincial highways
← Highway 43	→ Highway 52

Highway 49, known locally as the Spirit River Highway, is one of the two short connections from Dawson Creek to the border between B.C. and Alberta. Established in 1975, Highway 49 travels due east for 16 km (10 mi) from Dawson Creek to its connection with Alberta Highway 49, which the highway derives its number from, at the provincial border. This highway is the initial westernmost highway of the Northern Woods and Water Route.

== Major intersections ==
From south to north. The entire route is in Peace River Regional District.

Location	km	mi	Destinations	Notes
Dawson Creek	−2.08	−1.29	Highway 97 – Chetwynd, Prince George, Fort St. John, Whitehorse	Highway 97 north is the Alaska Highway; Highway 97 south is the John Hart Highway
Dawson Creek	0.00	0.00	Highway 2 (8th Street) – Grande Prairie, Edmonton	Roundabout; Highway 49 western terminus
	5.11	3.18	Rolla Road (Highway 908:1106) – Rolla, Clayhurst, Pouce Coupe	Highway 943:1196 is unsigned
	15.39	9.56	Highway 49 east (Northern Woods and Water Route) – Spirit River	Continuation into Alberta
1.000 mi = 1.609 km; 1.000 km = 0.621 mi: Closed/former
