= Leakage effect =

Loss of tourist revenue from a country

In the study of tourism, the leakage is the way in which revenue generated by tourism is lost to other countries' economies. Leakage may be so significant in some developing countries that it partially neutralizes the money generated by tourism.

== Methods ==
Leakage occurs through seven different mechanisms. It is an intrinsic component of international tourism and thus is present in every country, to widely varying degrees.

=== Goods and services ===
Many countries must purchase goods and services to satisfy their visitors. This includes the cost of raw materials used to make tourism-related goods, such as souvenirs. For starting tourism industries, this is a significant problem, as some countries must import as much as 50% of tourism-related products.

=== Infrastructure ===
Some less economically developed countries do not have the domestic ability to build tourism-related infrastructure (hotels, airports, etc.). The cost of such infrastructure is then leaked out of the country.

=== Foreign factors of production ===
Smaller countries often require foreign investment to start their tourism industry. Thus, profits from tourism may be lost to foreign investors. In addition, travel agents outside of the destination country remove money from that market as well.

=== Promotional expenditures ===
Many countries spend considerable sums of money for advertisements and publicity. Maintaining a presence abroad may increase the volume of tourists to a country but also represent a considerable loss of money to foreign markets.

=== Transfer pricing ===
Many foreign companies manipulate their pricing to reduce taxes and other duties. In smaller or less developed countries, where many tourism-related companies may be foreign owned, this can represent a substantial loss of income.

=== Tax exemptions ===
Countries with a small tourism industry may have to give tax exemptions or other offers to increase foreign investment. While this may enlarge the tourism industry there, it must be taken into account as an instrument of income loss. This will lead to lost in income to the host nation as various tax exemptions are provided.

=== Foreign workers ===
Often foreign workers are employed in tourism and especially on a temporary base. These workers typically stay a couple of months in the country, they live on the premises and take almost all of the salary home when they return home after their assignment. Depending the portion of this type of foreign workers it can represent a substantial loss of income.

== Application ==
A study of tourism 'leakage' in Thailand estimated that 70% of all money spent by tourists ended up leaving Thailand (via foreign-owned tour operators, airlines, hotels, imported drinks and food, etc.). Estimates for other Third World countries range from 80% in the Caribbean to 40% in India.

Leakage is not restricted to less-developed countries. Australia experiences a significant leakage effect from Japanese tourists. Though they spend the most per capita of all tourists to Australia, much of what they spend is through Japanese travel companies, Japanese hotels, and other foreign-owned businesses. There is thus significant leakage to Japan's economy.

Leakage not only varies from country to country, but also from industry to industry. High-income tourism may well significantly increase leakage, as that industry likely involves importing more goods and services than usual. Ecological or adventure tourism may exhibit a very small degree of leakage, however, as they place value solely on what the host country has to offer.

== Effect ==
As a result of the leakage effect, tourism industries in developed countries often are much more profitable per dollar received than tourism in smaller countries. Islands, in particular, suffer from significant leakage. In countries such as Turkey and the United Kingdom, the benefit to the economy from tourism is twice the dollar amount spent by tourists. In smaller places, such as Micronesia and Polynesia, that benefit is half the dollar amount spent. Some locations have managed to nullify the leakage effect almost entirely - New York City claims to generate seven dollars for the local economy per dollar spent by tourists. Some estimates of the degree of leakage claim only 5% of money spent on tourism remains in a developing country's economy.

== Reducing leakage ==
For many countries, some sources of leakage are unavoidable. Foreign-owned hotels and airlines are necessary for all but the most established of tourism industries. However, encouragement of domestic involvement in a country's tourism industry may reduce leakage in the long run. Currently, the most popular measure is restrictions on spending. Countries may limit the use of foreign currency within their borders, reducing the effect of transfer pricing (see above). Many countries require visitors to have a certain amount of money before entering, as well.

== See also ==
- Demonstration effect
