= Dawson Creek Secondary School =

Coordinates: 55.750545°N 120.243151°W

Dawson Creek Secondary

Location
- 10808 15 St; Dawson Creek, British Columbia, V1G 3Z3; Canada

Information
- School type: Public, high school
- School board: School District 59 Peace River South
- School number: 5959008
- Principal: Josh Kurjata
- Staff: 110
- Grades: 8-12
- Enrollment: 782 (January 16, 2019)
- Colours: Red, black, and white.
- Mascot: Coyote
- Website: dcss.sd59.bc.ca

Dawson Creek Secondary (or DCSS) is a public high school in Dawson Creek, British Columbia, Canada. DCSS is operated by School District 59 Peace River South and is the designated secondary school for the city. The school was formed through the 2010-2011 amalgamation of South Peace Secondary School, Central Middle School, and South Peace Distributed Learning School. The amalgamated school operates on two campuses: The South Peace Campus and Central Campus in the same facilities as the previous SPSS and SCMS.

The South Peace facility is a two-story building plus basement. A large majority of the classes are held on the ground floor. Generally shaped like a square with two "wings", one wing contains the gymnasium, cafeteria and the auditorium and is named Unchagah Hall. The auditorium is a full-sized theater accommodating community and school endeavours, however the main aim is the highly acclaimed Music Theater course where selected DCSS students enjoy an introduction to professional aspects of performance, technical`and business applications. Singing, acting, and dancing are the core disciplines, however alumni are well versed in the running of theater as a technical business trade. The other wing of the school contains the industrial shop classes (metalworks, woodworks, electrical and automotive). The library, the office, and "North Court" are located in the centre of the squared school.

In addition to traditional academic and athletic programs, the school operates a Hockey Academy in conjunction with the Pacific Rim Hockey Academy. DCSS is a participant in the school district's International Student Study Program.
