= Bob Zimmer =

Canadian politician

Bob Zimmer MP
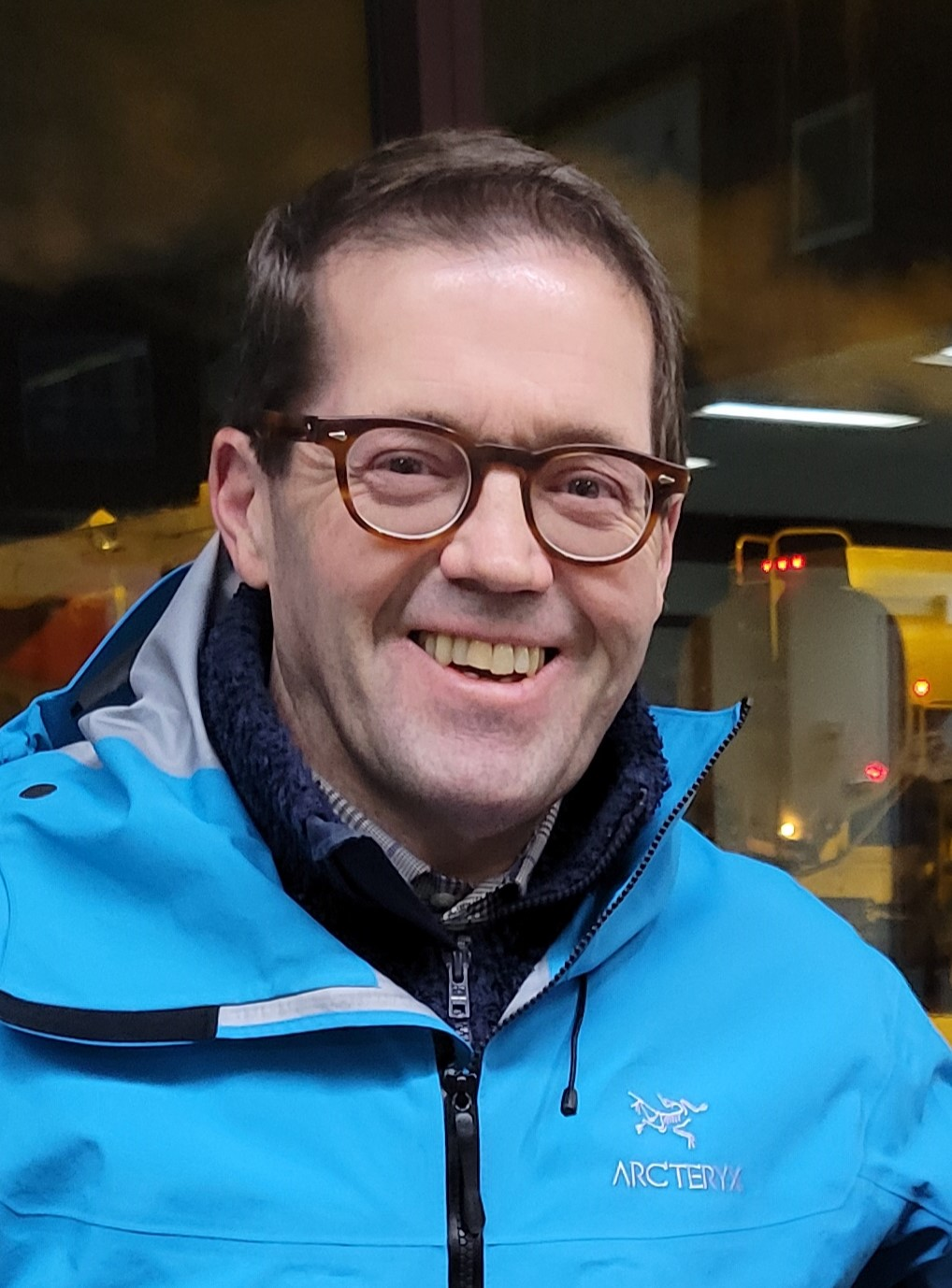
- Zimmer in 2024

Member of Parliament for Prince George—Peace River—Northern Rockies Prince George—Peace River (2011–2015)
- Incumbent
- Assumed office May 2, 2011
- Preceded by: Jay Hill

Personal details
- Born: October 20, 1968 (age 57) Dawson Creek, British Columbia, Canada
- Party: Conservative
- Other political affiliations: Reform
- Spouse: Val Zimmer
- Children: 4
- Education: Northern Lights College; Trinity Western University (BSc); University of British Columbia (BEd)
- Profession: Politician; teacher

Bob Zimmer MP (born October 20, 1968) is a Canadian politician who has been the member of Parliament (MP) for the British Columbia riding of Prince George—Peace River—Northern Rockies since May 2, 2011, as a member of the Conservative Party.

== Background ==
Zimmer was born in Dawson Creek, British Columbia, and grew up in nearby Fort St. John. After graduating from North Peace Secondary School in 1986, he worked as a welder's assistant in the oil industry. Through the Northern Lights College he became a journeyman carpenter and operated a small construction business between 1995 and 1998. In the 1990s, he moved to the Fraser Valley to play in the British Columbia Rugby Union. Between 1999 and 2003 he attended Trinity Western University, where he coached varsity rugby and graduated with a bachelor's degree in Human Kinetics. He completed a 12-month teaching degree at the University of British Columbia and moved back to Fort St. John where he accepted a teaching job at the North Peace Secondary School.

== Political career ==
Zimmer joined the Reform Party of Canada in 1988. He has cited Ralph Klein, the former premier of Alberta, and Preston Manning, the leader of Reform, as his political role models. While living in Abbotsford, British Columbia, he campaigned for Randy White, who was elected as a Reform Party member of parliament. After he returned to Fort St. John, he joined the Conservative Party's Prince George—Peace River Electoral District Association and served as its president until 2009 when he became its secretary and CEO. After long-time Member of Parliament Jay Hill announced he would not seek re-election, the riding's Electoral District Association held an election for the riding's Conservative Party nomination. In August 2010, Zimmer resigned from his duties in the Electoral District Association and announced he would stand in the nomination election. Five other people stood in the election, including fellow Fort St. John teacher Dan Davies and the former mayor of Prince George Colin Kinsley. With 1,350 votes cast in the March 2011 preferential vote, Zimmer won the nomination in the sixth round.

=== Member of Parliament ===
The next federal election was held in May 2011, when Zimmer faced former provincial politician Lois Boone for the New Democratic Party, Prince George lawyer Ben Levine for the Liberal Party of Canada, and physiotherapist Hilary Crowley for the Green Party of Canada. During the campaign Zimmer said he would advocate for reduced spending until the federal budget was balanced but also lobby to direct federal funds to widen Highways 2 and the Alaska Highway to four lanes between the Alberta border and Fort St. John. He noted that he believed pensions for former politicians were too high and that he would seek pension reform. Zimmer won the election with 62.12 per cent of the vote.

During the 2015 federal election, Zimmer opposed another study into murdered and missing Aboriginal women during a heated local candidates debate, saying 42 previous studies had already been done and that a primary problem, as stated in the Royal Canadian Mounted Police report, was economic status or lack of a job. After the debate, the Union of British Columbia Indian Chiefs called for Zimmer to step down as a candidate. Zimmer had stated that, "One of the major drivers of missing and murdered aboriginal women is the lack of economic activity, or simply put, the lack of a job. … Ultimately, when people have a job, they're not in despair. They can stay on reserve, and that's where we want them to be, we want them to be happy where they live." Grand Chief Stewart Philip, the president of the Union of BC Indian Chiefs, characterized Zimmer's remarks as "simplistic" and "unacceptable". Zimmer later clarified his comments, stating that he was referencing the RCMP's report on Missing and Murdered Aboriginal Women which lists employment status as one of the risk factors of murdered Aboriginal women. Zimmer went on to say that, "I absolutely care about missing and murdered Aboriginal women and want to see it stopped. I have a wife and a daughter and a mother and it is a tragedy that we need to fix."

Zimmer was re-elected with over 50% of the vote, and his Conservative Party formed the Official Opposition for the 42nd Canadian Parliament. After outgoing Prime Minister Stephen Harper resigned as leader of the Conservative Party, Rona Ambrose took over as acting leader; she appointed Zimmer to be the deputy critic of Families, Children and Social Development (to Karen Vecchio). In May 2016, Zimmer sponsored and brought forward in the House of Commons a petition with 25,000 signatures advocating for the de-restriction of the AR-15 semi-automatic modern sporting rifle. A month later, when that weapon was used in the Orlando nightclub shooting, the petition and Zimmer's advocacy were criticized.

In the May 2017 Conservative Party leadership election, Zimmer endorsed Andrew Scheer. Following Scheer's victory, he reassigned Zimmer to be deputy critic of the Treasury Board. On April 6, 2017, Zimmer introduced his first private member's bill, Bill C-346 An Act to amend the Firearms Act (licences) which would eliminate the expiry of firearms licences, with a mandatory provision that the licence holder update his or her relevant information every 10 years. The bill was debated but defeated at the second reading stage in November 2017, with only the Conservative Party voting in favour.

In October 2019 he was re-elected again, this time with just shy of 70% of the vote. On November 29, 2019, Andrew Scheer named him to the Shadow Cabinet as Shadow Minister for Northern Affairs and Northern Economic Development Agency.

==== Conversion therapy controversy ====
On October 28, 2020, Zimmer was one of seven Members of Parliament who voted against a bill (C-6) to add the following offences to the Criminal Code:

(a) causing a person to undergo conversion therapy against the person's will;

(b) causing a child to undergo conversion therapy;

(c) doing anything for the purpose of removing a child from Canada with the intention that the child undergo conversion therapy outside Canada;

(d) advertising an offer to provide conversion therapy; and

(e) receiving a financial or other material benefit from the provision of conversion therapy.

Zimmer faced backlash from constituents on social media and subsequently blocked those who publicly criticized him, reinvigorating the use of the #BlockedByBob hashtag created when Zimmer blocked constituents who criticized him previously over his actions on Twitter. Numerous studies show that conversion therapy leads to consequences including depression and suicidal thoughts. Zimmer has defended his vote against Bill C-6 because he said it "leaves open the possibility that voluntary conversations between individuals and their parents, family members, pastors, teachers, or their counsellors may be criminalized." However, Bill C-6 does not criminalize voluntary conversations about sexuality and sexual orientation.

== Electoral results ==
2025 Canadian federal election: Prince George—Peace River—Northern Rockies
Party	Candidate	Votes	%	±%	Expenditures
Conservative	Bob Zimmer	41,956	71.12	+11.79	$56,979.76
Liberal	Peter Njenga	11,545	19.57	+10.32	$2,674.46
New Democratic	Cory Grizz Longley	3,542	6.00	–8.37	$523.74
Green	Mary Forbes	1,259	2.13	–1.35	none listed
People's	David Watson	690	1.17	–9.23	$3,646.25
Total valid votes/expense limit		58,992	99.38	–	$168,296.23
Total rejected ballots		366	0.62	–0.25	
Turnout		59,358	66.68	+5.21	
Eligible voters		89,016			
Conservative notional hold		Swing		+0.65	
Source: Elections Canada

2021 Canadian federal election: Prince George—Peace River—Northern Rockies
Party	Candidate	Votes	%	±%	Expenditures
Conservative	Bob Zimmer	29,882	60.74	–9.05	$67,179.76
New Democratic	Cory Grizz Longley	6,647	13.51	+4.32	$6,918.81
People's	Ryan Dyck	5,138	10.44	+7.27	$25,911.91
Liberal	Amir Alavi	4,236	8.61	–2.98	$2,023.58
Green	Catharine Kendall	1,661	3.38	–2.88	$7,821.16
Maverick	David Jeffers	1,580	3.21	–	$9,943.33
Canada's Fourth Front	Phil Hewkin	53	0.11	–	none listed
Total valid votes/expense limit		49,197	99.13	–	$138,271.14
Total rejected ballots		430	0.87	+0.36	
Turnout		49,627	61.48	–6.85	
Eligible voters		80,724			
Conservative hold		Swing		–6.69	
Source: Elections Canada

2019 Canadian federal election: Prince George—Peace River—Northern Rockies
Party	Candidate	Votes	%	±%	Expenditures
Conservative	Bob Zimmer	38,473	69.79	+17.27	$77,720.06
Liberal	Mavis Erickson	6,391	11.59	–13.31	$15,885.38
New Democratic	Marcia Luccock	5,069	9.19	–6.26	none listed
Green	Catharine Kendall	3,448	6.25	+1.10	$3,346.08
People's	Ron Vaillant	1,748	3.17	–	$5,312.80
Total valid votes/expense limit		55,129	99.49	–	$133,865.40
Total rejected ballots		283	0.51	+0.13	
Turnout		55,412	68.33	+1.81	
Eligible voters		81,094			
Conservative hold		Swing		+15.29	
Source: Elections Canada

2015 Canadian federal election: Prince George—Peace River—Northern Rockies
Party	Candidate	Votes	%	±%	Expenditures
Conservative	Bob Zimmer	27,237	52.52	–9.33	$94,031.80
Liberal	Matt Shaw	12,913	24.90	+19.74	$4,485.98
New Democratic	Kathi Dickie	8,014	15.45	–10.40	$3,712.11
Green	Elizabeth Biggar	2,672	5.15	–0.91	$2,593.07
Libertarian	W. Todd Keller	559	1.08	–	none listed
Progressive Canadian	Barry Blackman	464	0.89	–	none listed
Total valid votes/expense limit		51,859	99.62	–	$260,780.28
Total rejected ballots		197	0.38	–	
Turnout		52,056	66.53	–	
Eligible voters		78,250			
Conservative hold		Swing		–14.53	
Source: Elections Canada

2011 Canadian federal election: Prince George—Peace River
Party	Candidate	Votes	%	±%	Expenditures
Conservative	Bob Zimmer	23,946	62.12	–1.47	$81,343.89
New Democratic	Lois Boone	9,876	25.62	+8.05	$36,073.10
Green	Hilary Crowley	2,301	5.97	–4.44	$11,717.50
Liberal	Ben Levine	2,008	5.21	–3.21	$9,196.83
Pirate	Jeremy Coté	415	1.08	–	none listed
Total valid votes/expense limit		38,546	99.68	–	$105,432.86
Total rejected ballots		125	0.32	–0.03	
Turnout		38,671	53.28	+4.39	
Eligible voters		72,580			
Conservative hold		Swing		–4.76	
Source: Elections Canada
