= Tumbler Ridge Secondary School =

Secondary school in British Columbia

Location
- 180 Southgate; Tumbler Ridge, British Columbia, V0C 2W0; Canada; 55.1238°N 121.0016°W

Information
- School type: Public, secondary school
- Founded: 1982; 44 years ago
- Closed: 2026; 0 years ago
- School board: School District 59 Peace River South
- Principal: Stacie Deeley
- Staff: 20
- Grades: 7–12
- Enrollment: 191 (2025–26)
- Colours: Navy and White
- Sports: Basketball, Volleyball, Track and Field
- Mascot: Kodiak
- Team name: Kodiaks
- Website: trss.sd59.bc.ca

Tumbler Ridge Secondary School (TRSS) was a public secondary school in Tumbler Ridge, British Columbia, Canada. TRSS was operated by School District 59 Peace River South and was the designated secondary school for the town's primary school. TRSS was a participant in the school district's International Student Study Program. For the 2025–26 school year, the school had an enrollment of 191 students from grades 7 to 12.

On February 10, 2026, a former student opened fire at the school with a modified handgun and a long gun after killing her mother and step-brother at their home in Tumbler Ridge. The shooting resulted in the deaths of five students and an education assistant at the school and injuries to 27 other people, before the shooter died from a self-inflicted gunshot wound. On February 16, the school announced that students would be returning to school in "portable facilities" and would have trauma experts on site.

On May 7, 2026, the provincial government of British Columbia announced that Tumbler Ridge Secondary School would be demolished and rebuilt. As of August 2026, the demolition is currently underway, and the building has been flattened.
