= British Columbia Highway 2 =

Provincial highway in Peace River Regional District, British Columbia, Canada

Highway 2
- Dawson Creek–Tupper Highway
- Hwy 2 highlighted in red

Route information
- Maintained by Ministry of Transportation
- Length: 42 km (26 mi)
- Existed: 1941–present

Major junctions
- West end: Highway 97 in Dawson Creek
- Highway 49 in Dawson Creek; Highway 52 near Tupper
- East end: Highway 43 near Tupper

Location
- Country: Canada
- Province: British Columbia
- Major cities: Dawson Creek
- Villages: Pouce Coupe

Highway system
- British Columbia provincial highways
| ← Highway 1A | → Highway 3 |

Highway 2, known locally as the Tupper Highway, is one of the two short connections from Dawson Creek to the border between British Columbia and Alberta.

== Route description ==
Highway 2 of the present day is 42 km (26 mi) long. It starts in Dawson Creek at its junction with Highway 97, and proceeds southeast for 39 km (24 mi) past the small settlement of Pouce Coupe, to its junction with Highway 52 near Tupper. Highway 2 connects with Alberta Highway 43 at the provincial border, 3 km (2 mi) southeast of Tupper.

== History ==
The actual Highway 2 designation has a more complex history than that of the highway that carries it today. When Highway 2 was first designated in 1941, it followed the present-day route of the Cariboo Highway between Cache Creek and Prince George. In 1952, Highway 2 was extended along the John Hart Highway all the way through Dawson Creek to the border between B.C. and Alberta at Tupper. In 1953, the section of Highway 2 between Cache Creek and Dawson Creek renumbered Highway 97, and the designations co-existed until 1962, when the Highway 2 designation was removed from the Cariboo and John Hart Highways.

== Major intersections ==
The entire route is in Peace River Regional District.

| Location | km | mi | Destinations | Notes |
|---|---|---|---|---|
| Dawson Creek | 0.00 | 0.00 | Highway 97 – Chetwynd, Prince George, Fort St. John, Whitehorse | Highway 97 north is the Alaska Highway; Highway 97 south is the John Hart Highway |
| Dawson Creek | 1.81 | 1.12 | 10th Street | To Alaska Highway Mile zero monument |
| Dawson Creek | 2.08 | 1.29 | Highway 49 east / 8th Street – Spirit River | Roundabout |
| Dawson Creek | 4.50 | 2.80 | Dangerous Goods Route / 7th Street | Dawson Creek truck bypass |
| | 9.20 | 5.72 | Rolla Road (Highway 908:1106 north) – Rolla, Spirit River | |
| Pouce Coupe | 12.17 | 7.56 | 50th Avenue / 50th Street | |
| | 39.55 | 24.58 | Highway 52 west – Tumbler Ridge | |
| | 41.62 | 25.86 | Highway 43 east – Grande Prairie, Edmonton | Continues into Alberta |
1.000 mi = 1.609 km; 1.000 km = 0.621 mi: Route transition
