= School District 59 Peace River South =

School district in British Columbia, Canada

Location
- Dawson Creek Dawson Creek, Chetwynd, Tumbler Ridge in Northeast Canada

District information
- Superintendent: Ms. Christy Fennell
- Schools: 23
- Budget: CA$38.8 million

Students and staff
- Students: 4507

Other information
- Website: www.sd59.bc.ca

School District 59 Peace River South is a school district in northeastern British Columbia near the Alberta border. Centered in Dawson Creek, it includes the communities of Chetwynd, Tumbler Ridge, and Pouce Coupe.

== Schools ==
School	Location	Grades
Canalta Elementary School	Dawson Creek	K-7
Chetwynd Secondary School	Chetwynd	8-12
Crescent Park Elementary School	Dawson Creek	K-7
Dawson Creek Secondary School (formerly South Peace SS and Central MS)	Dawson Creek	8-12
Devereaux Elementary School	Dawson Creek	K-7
Don Titus Elementary School	Chetwynd	K-7
Ecole Frank Ross Elementary School	Dawson Creek	K-7
Little Prairie Elementary School	Chetwynd	K-7
McLeod Elementary School	Groundbirch	K-7
Moberly Lake Elementary School	Moberly Lake	1-7
Parkland Elementary School	Farmington	K-7
Peace View School	Tower Lake	K-12
Pouce Coupe Elementary School	Pouce Coupe	K-7
SD 59 Electronic Education	Dawson Creek	1-12
Tremblay Elementary School	Dawson Creek	K-7
Tumbler Ridge Elementary School	Tumbler Ridge	K-6
Tumbler Ridge Secondary School	Tumbler Ridge	7-12
Ecole Windrem Elementary School	Chetwynd	K-7

== See also ==
- List of school districts in British Columbia
