= Northern Lights College =

College in British Columbia, Canada

- Former name: BC Vocational School Dawson Creek
- Type: Public
- Established: 1975
- Academic affiliations: CICan, BCC, UBC
- Endowment: $22,960,967
- Chair: Lorraine Audrey Archibald
- President: Todd Bondaroff
- Students: 691 (2024-25 FTE)
- Location: Dawson Creek, British Columbia, Fort St. John, British Columbia, Fort Nelson, British Columbia, Chetwynd, British Columbia
- Campus: Multiple sites, Rural
- Colours: Blue & green ;
- Website: www.nlc.bc.ca

Northern Lights College (NLC) is a public college in Northern British Columbia, Canada. It currently has campuses and access centers in eight communities across the northern third of British Columbia, with Regional Administration located at the Dawson Creek campus. As of 2021, international students comprised 25% of NLC's total student population and 20% identified as Indigenous.

== History ==
Jim Kassen began his 25-year career as the college president in 1980 and retired in 2005 seeing the college expand beyond the Dawson Creek campus to five campuses and three access centres. Dr M. Bryn Kulmatycki served as president from 2015 until February 2022, two months before his passing. Todd Bondaroff was selected as the new president in June of 2022. In 2025 Northern Lights College saw a downturn in enrolment of international students.

== List of campuses ==
- Dawson Creek
- Fort St. John
- Fort Nelson
- Tumbler Ridge
- Chetwynd

== List of Access Centres ==
- Atlin
- Dease Lake
- Hudson's Hope

== Programs ==
Northern Lights College offers programs in the following areas:

- Trades and Apprenticeships/Auto/Heavy Mechanical/Plumbing/Carpentry/Cook/Power Engineering/Wind Turbine/Electrical/Millwright/Welding/Aircraft Maintenance Technician
- University Arts and Sciences/ Academic
- Business Management/Applied Business Technology
- Career and College Preparation/ Upgrading
- Workforce Training/Continuing Education
- Oil & Gas Technologies
- Clean Energy Technologies
- Early Childhood Education and Care/ Education Assistant
- Teacher Training
- Practical Nursing/Health Care Assistant
- Aircraft Maintenance Technician, Canadian Armed Forces Accredited, Transport Canada Approved/Accredited.

== Athletics ==
Northern Lights College is the only Canadian College that fields a rodeo team. The team is based at the Dawson Creek campus and competes in the Canadian College Rodeo Association (CCRA).

== Aboriginal services ==
Northern Lights College has Aboriginal Gathering Spaces located at the following campuses: Dawson Creek, Fort St. John, Chetwynd and Fort Nelson. The Fort Nelson Gathering Space opened in 2009, while the remaining Gathering Spaces opened in 2011.

The opening of the Chetwynd Gathering Space was highlighted by the attendance of then Lieutenant Governor of British Columbia, Steven L. Point.

In 2021 Northern Lights College received $70,000 to support two Indigenous education endowment and project funds.

== Scholarships and bursaries ==
The Northern Lights College Foundation is the recipient of funds held in trust for various awards for education. Formed in 1981, the Foundation's objectives are:

1. to foster community interest in promoting higher education and training
2. to act as a recipient of trust funds in the form of monies or other properties
3. to assist in community projects and promotion of higher education and to grant monies to Northern Lights College for the designated use of scholarships and bursaries to be awarded to students.

The Government of Canada sponsors an Aboriginal Bursaries Search Tool that lists over 680 scholarships, bursaries, and other incentives offered by governments, universities, and industry to support Aboriginal post-secondary participation. Northern Lights College scholarships for Aboriginal, First Nations and Métis students include Awards for Aboriginal Women

== Notable Faculty and Alumni ==
Bob Zimmer, Canadian politician and a Member of Parliament in the House of Commons of Canada.

== See also ==
- List of institutes and colleges in British Columbia
- List of universities in British Columbia
- Higher education in British Columbia
- Education in Canada
