= Peace (disambiguation) =

Peace is a state of tranquility or harmony.

Peace may also refer to:

- Peace (law), various legal protections offered to people in a specific area, by a court, head of state or legislature
- World peace
- Inner peace

== Arts and entertainment ==
=== Music ===
- Peace (band), an English rock band
- Peace (rapper), Mtulazaji Davis, American rapper

==== Albums ====
- Peace (Anything Box album), 1990
- Peace (Bethel Music album) or the title song, 2020
- Archie Shepp – Bill Dixon Quartet, 1963 album re-released as Peace in 1970 with a different track order
- Peace (Chet Baker album), 1982
- Peace (The Cult album), 2000
- Peace (Dayna Stephens album) or the title song, 2014
- Peace (Demon Hunter album) or the title song, 2019
- Peace (Eurythmics album), 1999
- Peace (Graveyard album), 2018
- Peace (Ira Sullivan album), 1979
- Peace (Jim Brickman album) or the title song, 2003
- Peace (Levellers album), 2020
- Peace (Libera album), 2010
- Peace (Vista Chino album), 2013
- Peace (Walt Dickerson album), 1976
- Peace (York album) or the title song, 2006
- Peace, Vol. II by Bethel Music, 2021
- P.E.A.C.E. (album) (International P.E.A.C.E. Benefit Compilation), 1984
- Peace, by Kids in Glass Houses, 2013

==== Songs ====
- "Peace" (Depeche Mode song), 2009
- "Peace" (Horace Silver song), 1959
- "Peace" (Sabrina Johnston song), 1991
- "Peace" (Taylor Swift song), 2020
- "Peace", by Ab-Soul from Soul Burger, 2024
- "Peace", by Alison Wonderland, 2019
- "Peace", by Aṣa from Aṣa, 2007
- "Peace", by Hillsong Young & Free from III, 2018
- "Peace", by Katey Sagal from Well..., 1994
- "Peace", by Ornette Coleman from The Shape of Jazz to Come, 1959
- "Peace", by the Outfield from Any Time Now, 2006
- "Peace", by Vixen from Tangerine, 1998
- "Peace", by Weezer from Make Believe, 2005

=== Other media ===
- Peace (1949 film), a Spanish drama film
- Peace (2022 film), an Indian Malayalam film
- Peace (novel), a 1975 novel by Gene Wolfe
- Peace (play), by Aristophanes
- Peace (Saville), a 1922 sculpture by Bruce Wilder Saville
- Peace Magazine, a Canadian pacifist periodical

== Mythology and religion ==
- Eirene (goddess), a goddess in Greek mythology known as Peace
- Pax (goddess), a goddess in Roman mythology known as Peace
- P.E.A.C.E. Plan, an initiative begun by Saddleback Church in Lake Forest, California, US

== People ==
- Peace (surname), a list of people with the name
- Peace Adzo Medie, Liberian-born Ghanaian academic and writer
- Peace Anyiam-Osigwe, Nigerian filmmaker
- Peace Butera, Ugandan culinary artist
- Peace Efih (born 2000), Nigerian footballer
- Peace Hyde, British Ghanaian education activist and media personality
- Peace Kusasira (born 1962), Ugandan politician and social worker
- Peace Mabe (born 1976), South African politician
- Peace Mutuuzo (born 1975), Ugandan politician
- Peace Uzoamaka Nnaji (born 1952), Nigerian politician
- Peace Proscovia (born 1989), Ugandan netball player
- Peace Uko (born 1995), Nigerian sprinter
- Peace Uwase (born 1978), Rwandan accountant and bank executive

== Other uses ==
- Peace (cigarette), a Japanese brand
- Peace (rose) or Rosa Peace, a garden rose
- Peace, an iOS content blocker application by Marco Arment
- Peace Coffee, an American coffee company based in Minneapolis, Minnesota
- Peace Iced Tea, a Coca-Cola Company brand
- Peace College, Raleigh, North Carolina, US
- PEACE method of interrogation

== See also ==
- List of periods of regional peace
- Municipal District of Peace No. 135, Alberta, Canada
- Peace River (disambiguation)
- Peace Bridge (disambiguation)
- Peace Township, Kanabec County, Minnesota
- Peace process (disambiguation)
- Peace symbol
- Peace treaty
- Pax (disambiguation)
- Peace Fund, a charitable organization
- United States Department of Peace
- Pea (disambiguation), including peas
- Pease (disambiguation)
- Piece (disambiguation)
- The Peace (disambiguation)
