= Integrated Cadastral Information Society =

- ICIS logo
- Company type: Not for profit society
- Industry: Geographic Information Systems
- Founded: May 2001; 25 years ago
- Headquarters: Victoria, British Columbia, Canada
- Products: Spatial Data, Web Mapping, Municipal Grants
- Number of employees: 6
- Website: www.icisociety.ca

The Integrated Cadastral Information Society (ICI Society) is a not-for-profit organization, created as a partnership between local government, provincial government, and major utility companies in British Columbia, Canada to share and integrate spatial data.

Incorporated in May 2001, ICI Society held its first annual general meeting in June 2002 where a board of directors was elected. The board is made up of 15 directors representing each of the founding membership groups: 5 from local government, 5 from the Provincial government and 5 from the major utility companies.

== Membership ==
ICI Society members include:

- Provincial Government of British Columbia Agencies & Ministries
- Local Governments across British Columbia, including Municipalities and Regional Districts
- First Nations governments, communities, and organizations in British Columbia
- Utility companies operating in British Columbia
- Federal Government of Canada
- School Districts in British Columbia
- Improvement Districts in British Columbia

== Shared data ==
Shared member data includes:

- ParcelMap BC: Maintained and contributed by Land Title and Survey Authority of British Columbia, ParcelMap BC represents the single, complete, trusted and sustainable spatial representation of cadastre in BC.
- ICI Cadastre: ICI Cadastre is a Society aggregated fabric of cadastral data maintained and provided by Local Government, as well as GeoBC’s Integrated Cadastral Fabric and ParcelMap BC where in use by Local Government.
- Address: Address data maintained and provided by Local Government and First Nations is aggregated by the Society to populate AddressBC; a central and authoritative civic address registry for BC.
- Assessment: Assessment data maintained and contributed by BC Assessment is a geospatial representation of the assessment roll that utilizes ParcelMap BC spatial alignment.
- Infrastructure: Infrastructure data maintained and contributed by major Utility organizations operating in BC.

== See also ==
- BC Assessment Authority
- Land Title and Survey Authority
- The Association of British Columbia Land Surveyors
- Association of Canada Lands Surveyors
