= Gargoyle Mountain =

Mountain in Alberta, Canada

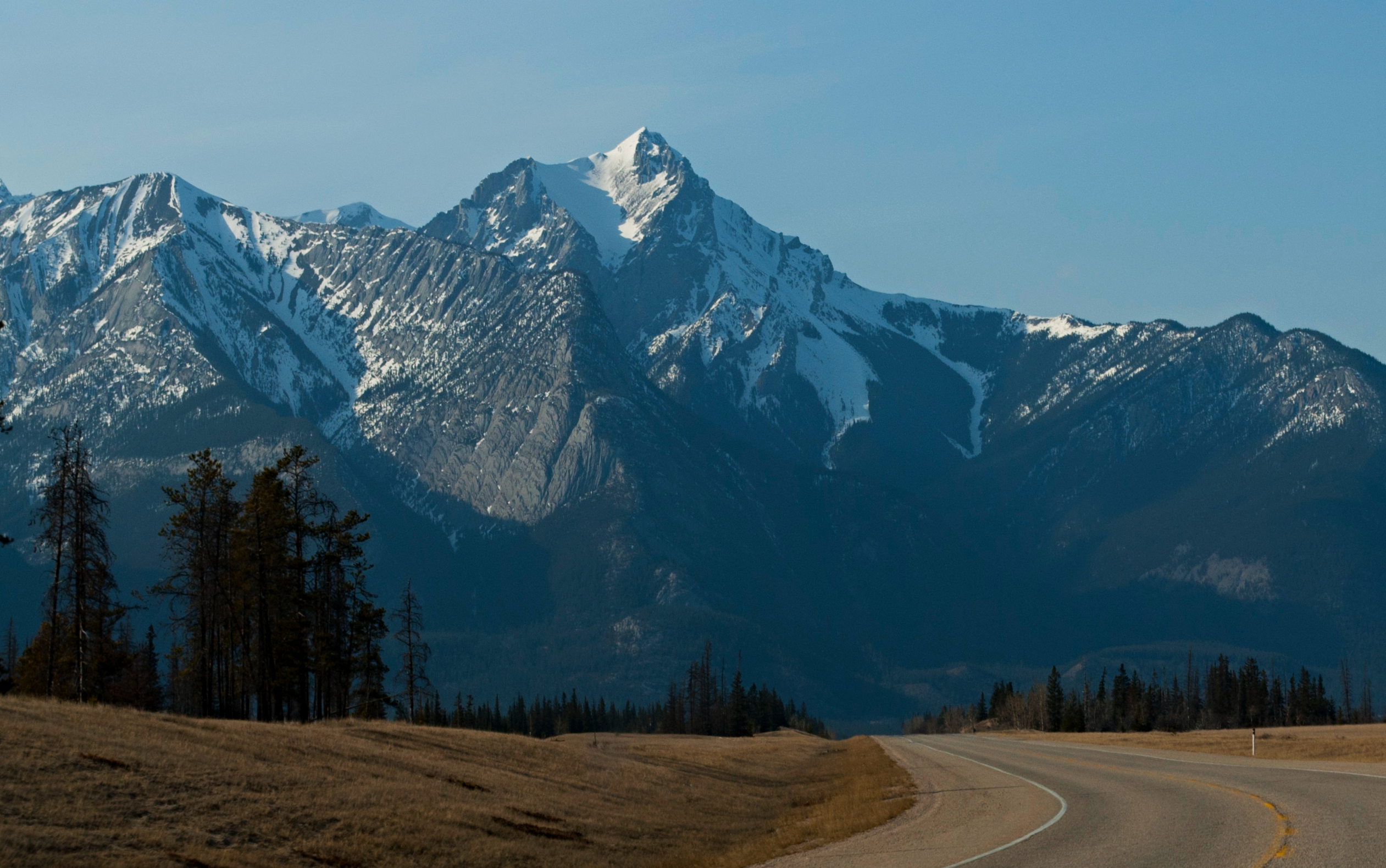
- Gargoyle Mountain seen from Highway 16

Highest point
- Elevation: 2,693 m (8,835 ft)
- Prominence: 361 m (1,184 ft)
- Parent peak: Cliff Mountain (2763 m)
- Listing: Mountains of Alberta
- Coordinates: 53°06′06″N 118°09′25″W

Geography
- Location within Alberta Location within Canada
- Interactive map of Gargoyle Mountain
- Country: Canada
- Province: Alberta
- Protected area: Jasper National Park
- Parent range: Front Ranges
- Topo map: NTS 83E1 Snaring River

Geology
- Rock type: sedimentary rock

Gargoyle Mountain is a 2,693-metre (8,835-foot) mountain summit located in Jasper National Park, in the Canadian Rockies of Alberta, Canada. The peak is situated 23 kilometres north of the municipality of Jasper, and is a prominent landmark in the Athabasca Valley visible from Highway 16 and The Canadian. Its nearest higher peak is Cliff Mountain, 5.5 km (3.4 mi) to the west. Gargoyle Mountain was named in 1916 by Morrison P. Bridgland for the fact a stream heads at the mountain, like a gargoyle or spout. Bridgland (1878-1948) was a Dominion Land Surveyor who named many peaks in Jasper Park and the Canadian Rockies. The mountain's name was officially adopted in 1956 by the Geographical Names Board of Canada.

== Climate ==
Based on the Köppen climate classification, Gargoyle Mountain is located in a subarctic climate with cold, snowy winters, and mild summers. Temperatures can drop below -20 °C with wind chill factors below -30 °C. In terms of favorable weather, June through September are the best months to climb. Precipitation runoff from Gargoyle Mountain flows into the Athabasca River.

== See also ==
- Geography of Alberta

== Gallery ==
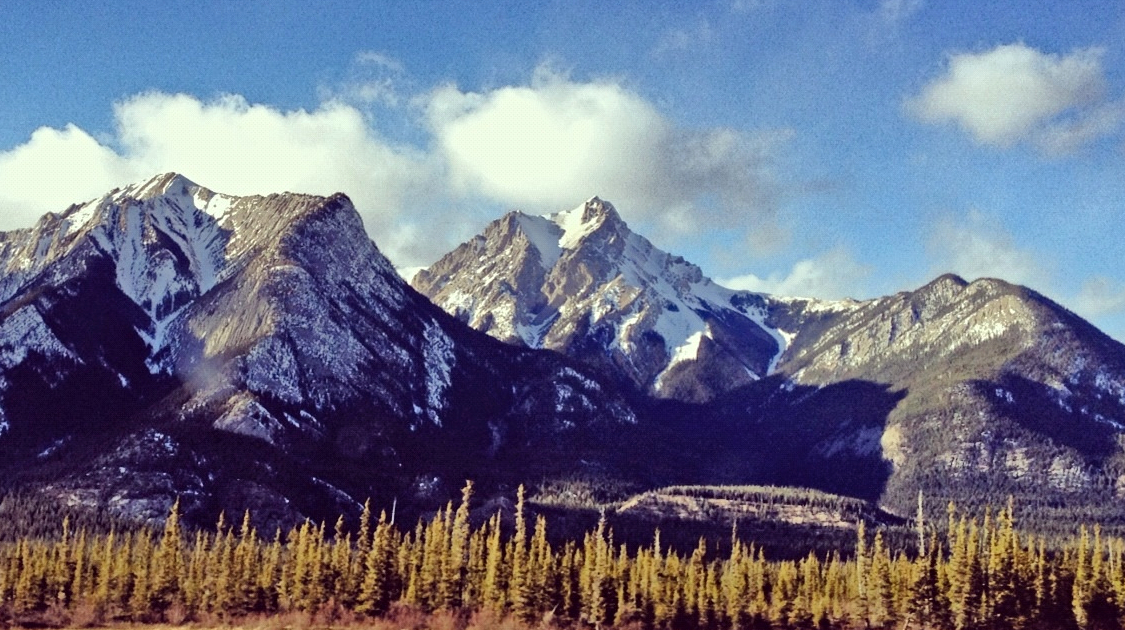
Esplanade Mountain (left) and Gargoyle Mountain (center)

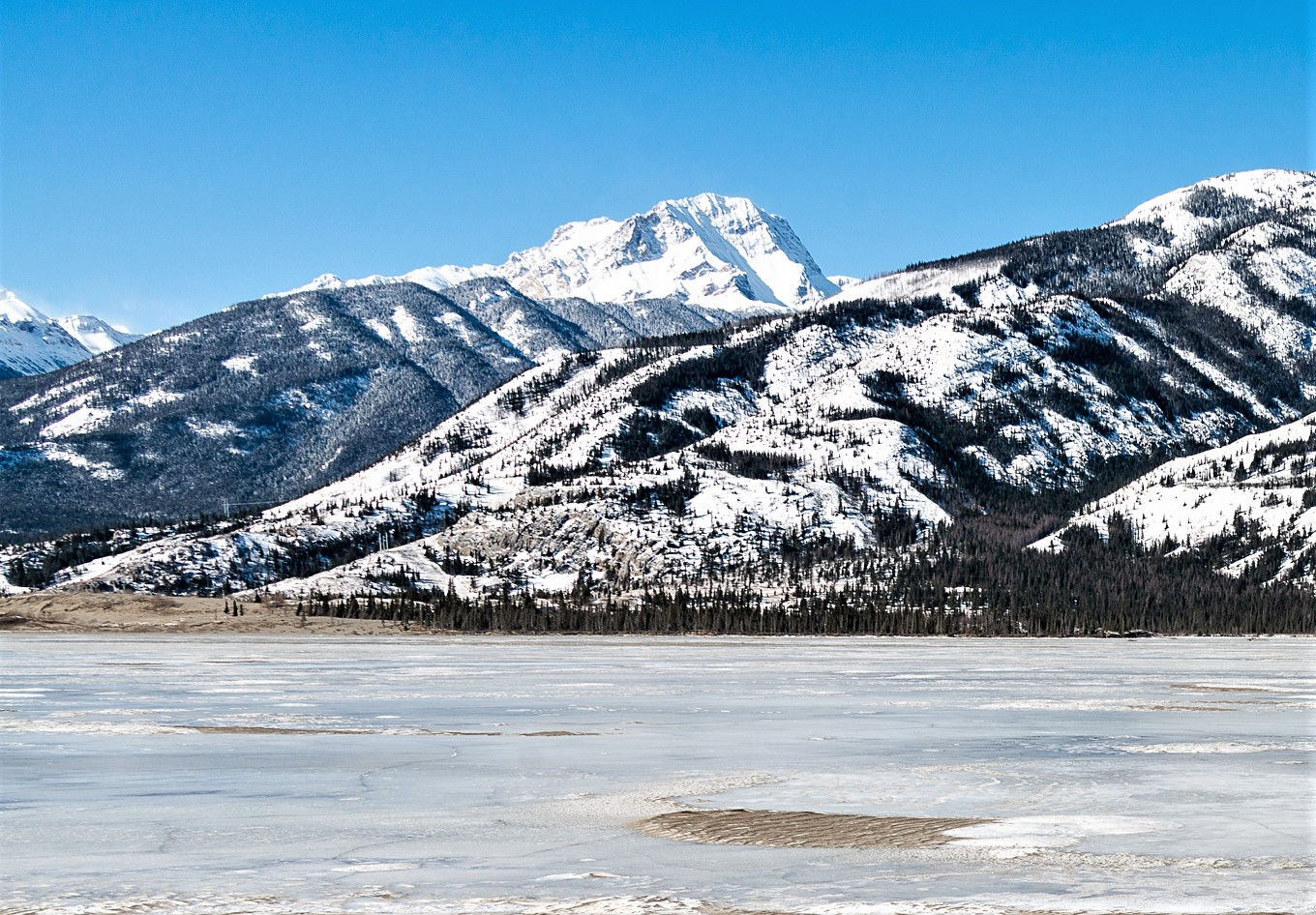
Winter scene of Gargoyle Mountain

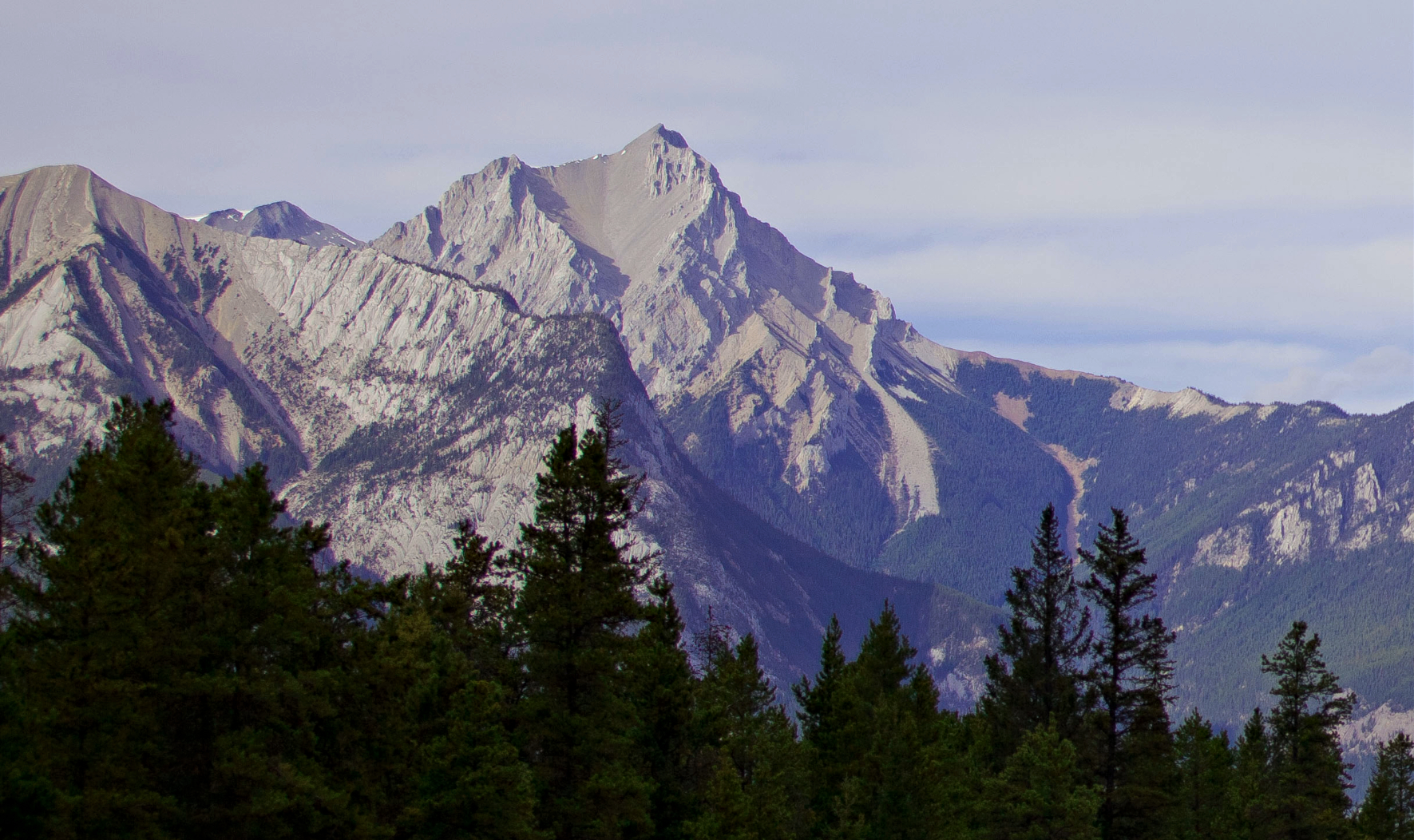
Gargoyle Mountain from Highway 16

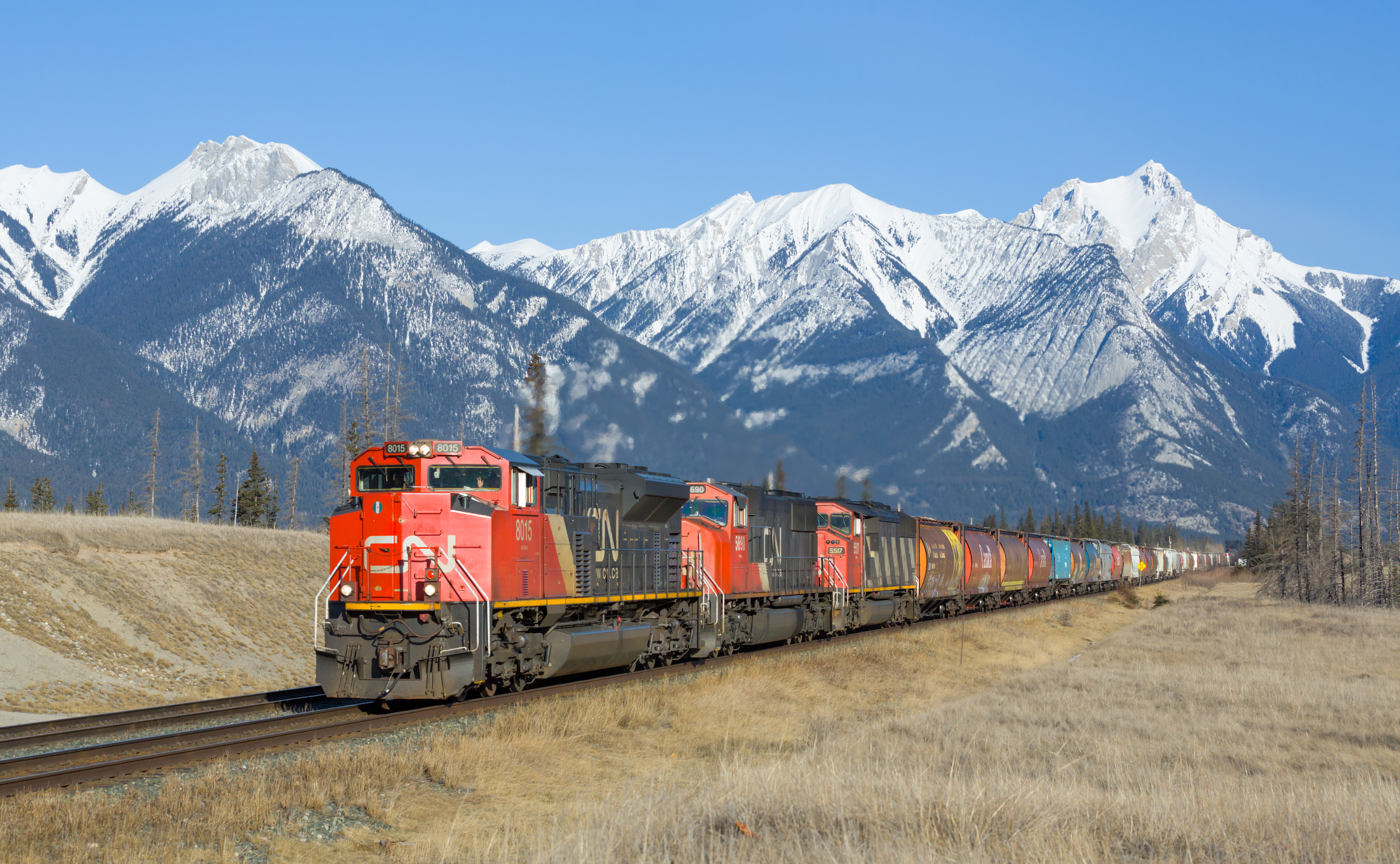
Gargoyle Mountain to right

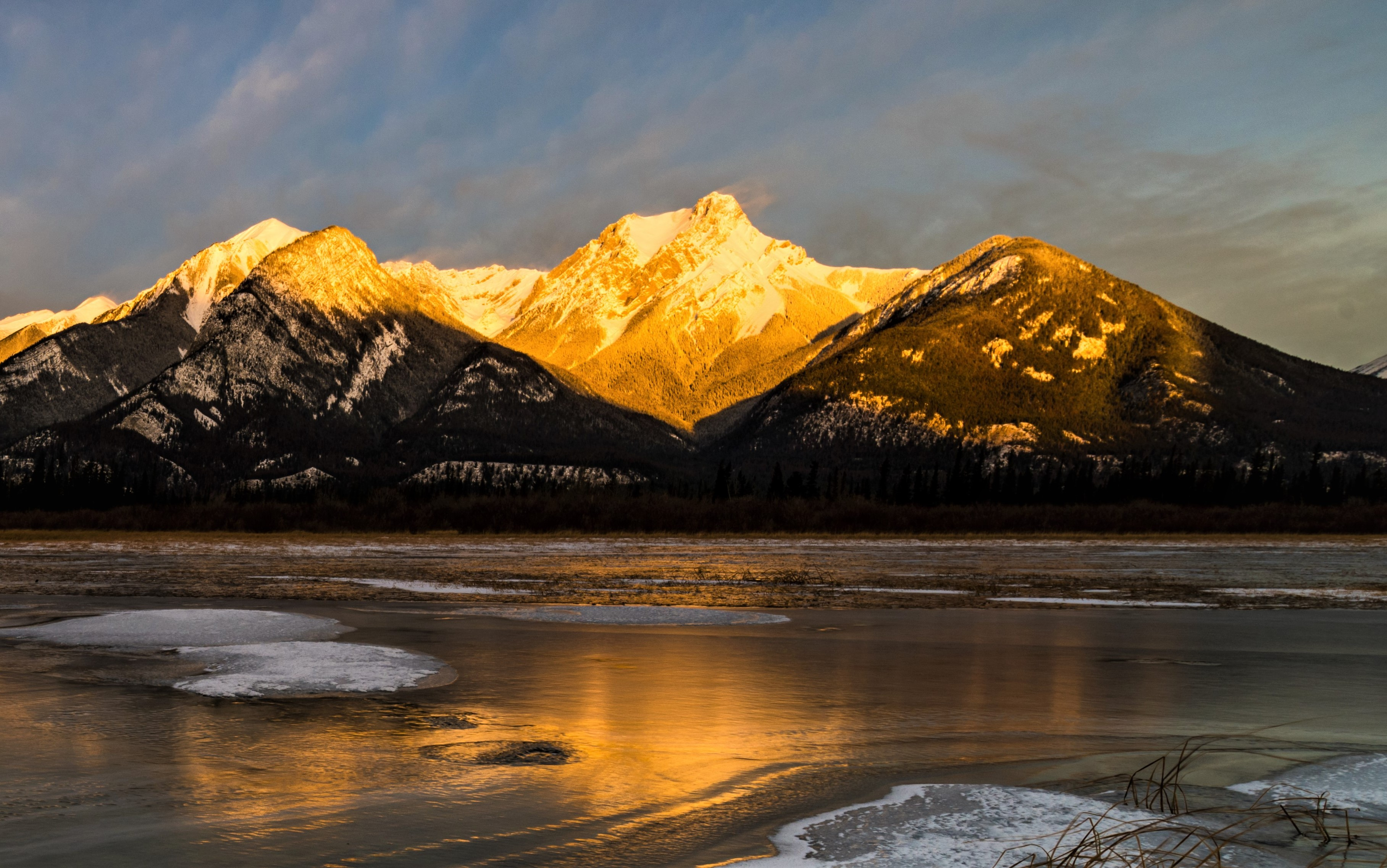
Southeast aspect

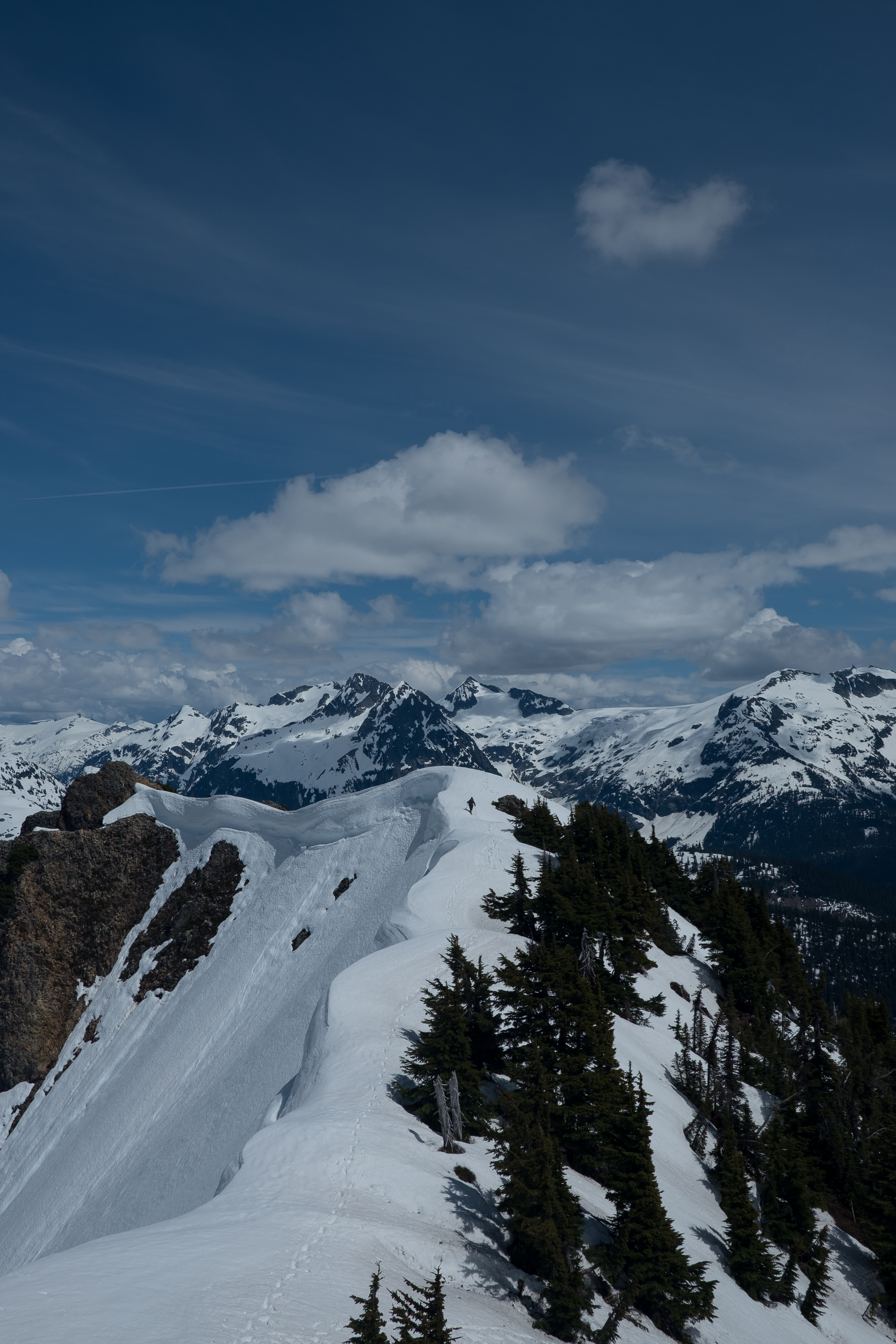
Snowy slopes of Gargoyle Mountain

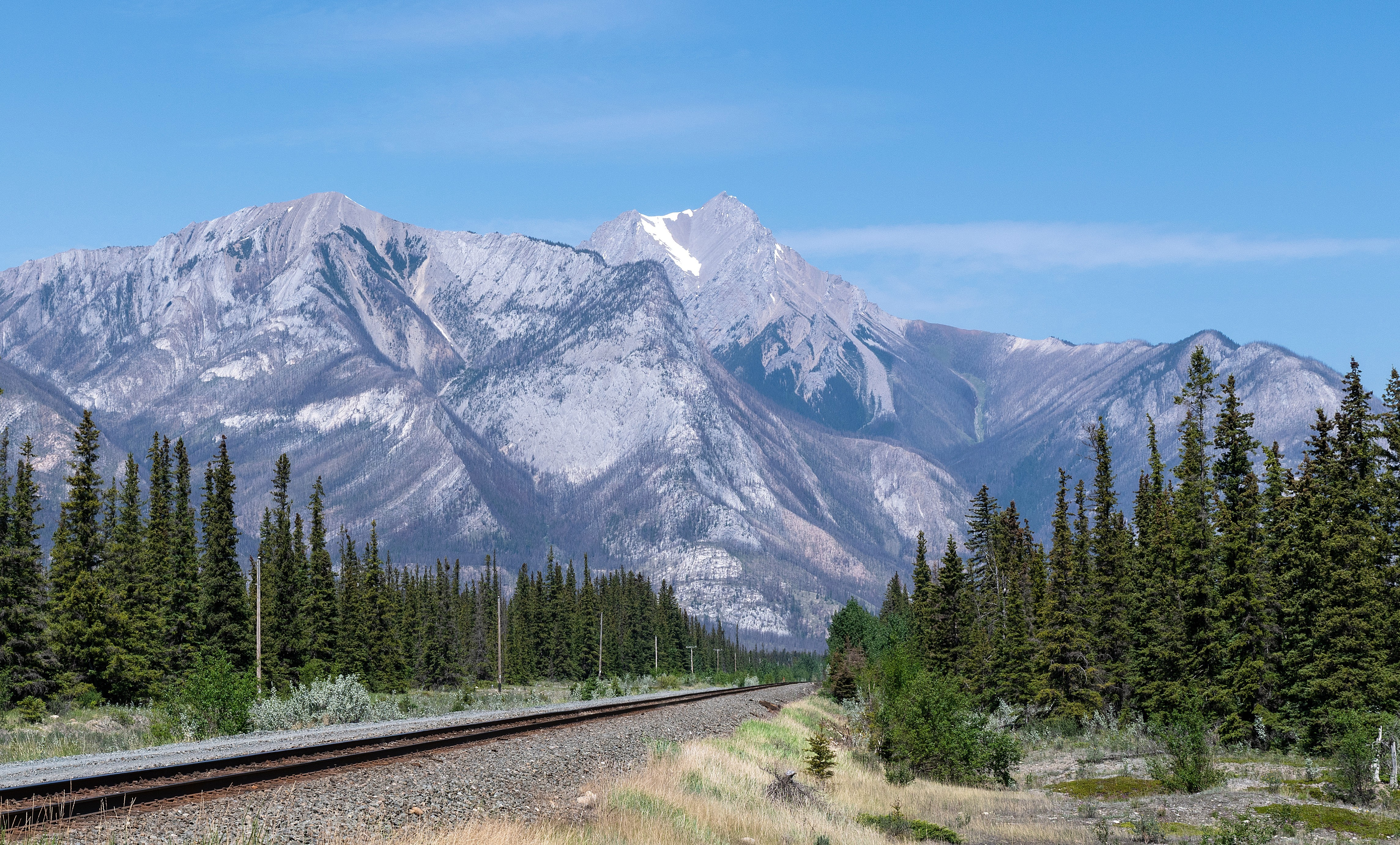
Gargoyle Mountain centered and Esplanade Mountain (left)
