= Association of Canada Lands Surveyors =

The Association of Canada Lands Surveyors (ACLS) is the national licensing body for professionals surveying in the three Canadian territories, in the Federal parks, on Aboriginal reserves, as well as on and under the surface of Canada's oceans. It is a self-governing, non-profit, non-governmental organization that manages the activities of its members across Canada in the field of cadastral (boundary or legal) surveying.

Of the Canadian surveying associations, the ACLS has the largest jurisdiction in terms of geographic size; it covers about 10,900,000 square kilometres, which is nearly seven times the surface area of the Province of Quebec.

The ACLS is the eleventh licensing surveying association in Canada. Cadastral surveying in the provinces is governed by provincial legislation and each Canadian province has a surveying association which is responsible for regulating its members. However, as provincial legislation does not cover "Canada Lands" ACLS is an important part of governing Canada's boundaries.

== History ==
On April 24, 1874, the Association of Dominion Land Surveyors was founded. Although that organization eventually became the Association of Manitoba Land Surveyors, federal land surveyors were called Dominion Land Surveyors (DLS) until the Canada Lands Surveys Act passed on March 31, 1979.

After a few attempts at affiliating themselves with a provincial land surveying organization, federal land surveyors reclaimed the Association of Dominion Land Surveyors in the early 1900s, and then became a branch of the Canadian Institute of Surveying (CIS). During this time, federal land surveyors had no association of their own.

The Association of Canada Lands Surveyors was officially incorporated on May 24, 1985, and began an initiative to become self-regulating. ACLS assumed its responsibilities as a national, self-regulating Association on March 18, 1999, when the Canada Lands Surveyors Act came into force. On this date, the ACLS also became a licensing body.

== Canada Lands ==
"Canada Lands" is a specific term to define lands that fall under any of the following criteria:

Any lands belonging to Her Majesty in right of Canada or of which the Government of Canada has power to dispose that are situated in Yukon, the Northwest Territories, Nunavut or in any National Park of Canada and any lands that are

- Surrendered lands or a reserve, as those expressions are defined in the Indian Act, other than reserve lands described in regulations made under section 4.1 of the First Nations Commercial and Industrial Development Act;
- Category IA land or Category IA-N land, as defined in the Cree-Naskapi (of Quebec) Act, chapter 18 of the Statutes of Canada, 1984;
- Sechelt lands, as defined in the Sechelt Indian Band Self-Government Act, chapter 27 of the Statutes of Canada, 1986;
- Settlement land, as defined in the Yukon First Nations Self-Government Act, and lands in which an interest is transferred or recognized under section 21 of that Act;
- Lands in the Kanesatake Mohawk interim land base, as defined in the Kanesatake Interim Land Base Governance Act, other than the lands known as Doncaster Reserve No. 17;
- Tlicho lands, as defined in section 2 of the Mackenzie Valley Resource Management Act.
- Any lands under water belonging to Her Majesty in right of Canada or in respect of any rights in which the Government of Canada has power to dispose.

== Licensing ==
Surveyors use skills in the science of measurement and positioning to accurately measure the true dimensions of property. This is used to prepare plot plans, real property reports, place boundary markers, and other activities ensuring the accuracy of public property records. Surveyors are an important part of marking boundaries, even with the advances in technologies such as Google Maps.

ACLS licensed members are the only individuals legally authorized to perform cadastral surveys on a special category of lands called "Canada Lands". Cadastral surveying is the branch of surveying that encompasses all activities related to establishing and defining the extent of a legal interest in land. These activities are also referred to as boundary or legal surveying.

In order to survey on Canada Lands, a professional surveyor must first obtain a commission from the Association of Canada Lands Surveyors. This requires the surveyor to pass a series of exams on various topics, such as Acts and Regulations Relating to Surveys of Canada Lands, Property Rights Systems on Canada Lands, and Government Structures and Aboriginal Government Issues.

Once a commission is received, the surveyor is then eligible to have a regular membership with the ACLS.

To complete the last step and obtain a licence, a surveyor must be a regular member of the ACLS and have two years of experience and practical training in surveying in the previous five years.

== Continuing Education ==
All licence holders of the ACLS must complete a mandatory 40 hours of continuing professional development over a period of three years. This is to ensure that all practising Canada Lands Surveyors are up to date with new technology and methods.

All licensed Canada Lands surveyors are required to have their work reviewed by the association practice review manager

== Multidisciplinary ==
Canada Lands surveyors specialize in one or more disciplines and often have some knowledge of all types of surveying, so it is choice of the professional to find the best solution to any technical or management problem related to measurement and spatial positioning.

Types of surveying include:

- Land surveying: measurement and positioning on land
- Hydrography: measurement and positioning on water
- Photogrammetry: measurement and positioning with the use of aerial photographs
- Mapping: drafting of maps or charts
- Remote sensing: collection of data on an object or an area on the Earth from a distance (satellites, aircraft, etc.)
- Land registration: management of property rights information (titles, deeds)
- Geographic Information Systems (GIS): computerized geographic information management

== See also ==
- Association of British Columbia Land Surveyors
- Dominion Land Survey
- Land Title and Survey Authority
