= Dominion Lands Act =

1872 Canadian law that aimed to encourage the settlement of the Canadian Prairies

Parliament of Canada
- Long title: An Act respecting the Public Lands of the Dominion
- Citation: SC 1872, c. 23
- Territorial extent: North-West Territories; Manitoba; Saskatchewan; Alberta; British Columbia (certain areas only)
- Enacted by: Parliament of Canada
- Royal assent: April 14, 1872
- Repealed: 1950

Repealed by
- Territorial Lands Act
- Status: Repealed

The Dominion Lands Act (French: Loi des terres fédérales) was an 1872 Canadian law that aimed to encourage the settlement of the Canadian Prairies and to help prevent the area being claimed by the United States. The act was closely based on the U.S. Homestead Act of 1862, setting conditions in which the western lands could be settled and their natural resources developed.

In 1871, the Government of Canada entered into Treaty 1 and Treaty 2 to obtain the consent of the Indigenous nations from the territories set out respectively in each treaty. The treaties provided for the use of lands "for immigration and settlement". To settle the area, Canada invited mass emigration by European and American pioneers, and by settlers from eastern Canada. The act echoed the US homestead system by offering ownership of 160 acres (0.65 km^{2}) of land free (except for a small registration fee) to any man over 18 or any woman heading a household. They did not need to be British subjects in the early versions of the act, but had to live on the plot and improve it.

== Application ==
Britain had taken possession of lands in western Canada in the form of Rupert's Land, which was then transferred to Canada after Confederation. Canada established the province of Manitoba and the North-West Territories. Additionally, some land was set aside for the national railway and some land remained under the control of the Hudson's Bay Company, leaving the rest as public lands, to be negotiated with the Indigenous peoples. From 1871 onwards, the Government of Canada negotiated the Numbered Treaties on behalf of the Crown with the First Nations of western Canada to extinguish aboriginal title, establish reserves and establish federal obligations such as education and health care in exchange for lands to settle.

Canada passed the Dominion Lands Act in 1872 to encourage settlement. The act was applied to Manitoba and the North-West Territories. Upon the creation of the provinces of Saskatchewan and Alberta from the North-West Territories, the act continued to apply to them. It was also extended to the Peace River Block of British Columbia. In 1876, the act was amended to prohibit single women from claiming a homestead, except those classified as the head of a household, which effectively limited female participation to widows with dependent children; this contrasted with the United States, where single women were permitted to homestead. In 1930, the federal government agreed to transfer control over the public lands and natural resources to the prairie provinces by means of the Natural Resources Acts. From that point onwards, the Dominion Lands Act only applied in the North-West Territories.

== Requirements for disposition by way of homestead grant ==
The following are examples of some of the well-known requirements (for entering a homestead and subsequently earning the right to receive title to applicable homestead lands) that applied at some time over the approximate 58-year period that the act remained in effect. The act (and its regulations) were amended numerous times over time resulting in frequent changes of the requirements over time. For example, there were many revisions (starting first in 1908) requiring that the applicant be a British subject at the time of entry, or at the time of the grant of title, or both.

The act gave a claimant 160 acres (65 ha) for free, the only cost to the farmer being a $10 administration fee. Any male farmer who was at least 21 years of age and agreed to cultivate at least 40 acres (16 ha) of the land and build a permanent dwelling on it (within three years) qualified. This condition of "proving up the homestead" was instituted to prevent speculators from gaining control of the land.

The act also launched the Dominion Lands Survey, which laid the framework for the layout of the Prairie provinces that continues to this day.

An important difference between the Canadian and U.S. systems was that farmers under the Canadian system could buy a neighbouring lot for an additional $10 registration fee, once they had made certain improvements to their original quarter-section. This allowed most farmsteads to quickly double in size, and was especially important in the southern Palliser's Triangle area of the prairies, which was very arid. There it was all but impossible to have a functional farm on only 160 acres (0.65 km^{2}), but it could be managed with 320 acres (1.3 km^{2}). Canadian agriculture was consequently more successful than U.S. agriculture in this arid region.

Bloc settlements were encouraged by section 37 which allowed associations of 10 or more settlers to group their houses together to form a settlement to fulfil their cultivation obligations on their own homestead while residing in a hamlet.

== Results ==
The first version of the act set up extensive exclusion zones. Claimants were limited to areas further than 20 miles (32 km) from any railway (much of the land closer having been granted to the railways at the time of construction). Since it was extremely difficult to farm wheat profitably if it had to transported over 20 miles by wagon, this was a major discouragement. Farmers could buy land within the 20-mile zone, but at a much higher price of $2.50 per acre ($6.2/ha). In 1879, the exclusion zone was shrunk to only 10 miles (16 km) from the tracks; and in 1882 it was finally eliminated.

Less than half of the arable land in the West was ever open to farmers for homesteading under the act. The Hudson's Bay Company, which had once controlled the entire prairies, had kept five percent of the land as part of the terms of the surrender of its charter. Both the railways and Hudson's Bay sold land to land companies and to farmers on the open market. Additional areas were set aside for schools and government buildings. Overall, about 478,000 square kilometres (118,000,000 acres) of land was sold away by the Government of Canada under the act.

== Repeal of the act ==
From 1930 onwards, the act only applied to the public lands in the Northwest Territories. The homestead provisions of the act, designed to encourage agricultural settlement on the prairies, had little application to the conditions in the Northwest Territories. Parliament repealed the act in 1950, replacing it with the Territorial Lands Act, which was better adapted to the conditions in the Territories. The new Act did not contain any homesteading provisions.

== See also ==
- "Last Best West"
