= Butera (surname) =

Butera is a surname of Sicilian origin. It is also a common name in Rwanda. Notable people with the surname include:

- Ariana Grande-Butera (born 1993), American singer, songwriter and actress, known professionally as Ariana Grande
- Drew Butera (born 1983), American baseball player
- Faustin Butéra (born 1955), Rwandan sprinter
- Ismail Butera, accordionist plays with such klezmer bands as Hot Pstromi and Metropolitan Klezmer
- Jeanne Ingabire Butera (born 1990), Rwandan singer, known professionally as Knowless
- Lou Butera (1937–2015), American pool player
- Peace Butera, Ugandan culinary artist
- Robert Butera (born 1935), American politician
- Sal Butera (born 1952), American baseball player, father of Drew
- Sam Butera (1927–2009), American saxophonist and bandleader
- Scott Butera, American businessman and Arena Football League Commissioner
