= On Hing Building =

Coordinates: 48.42954°N 123.36813°W

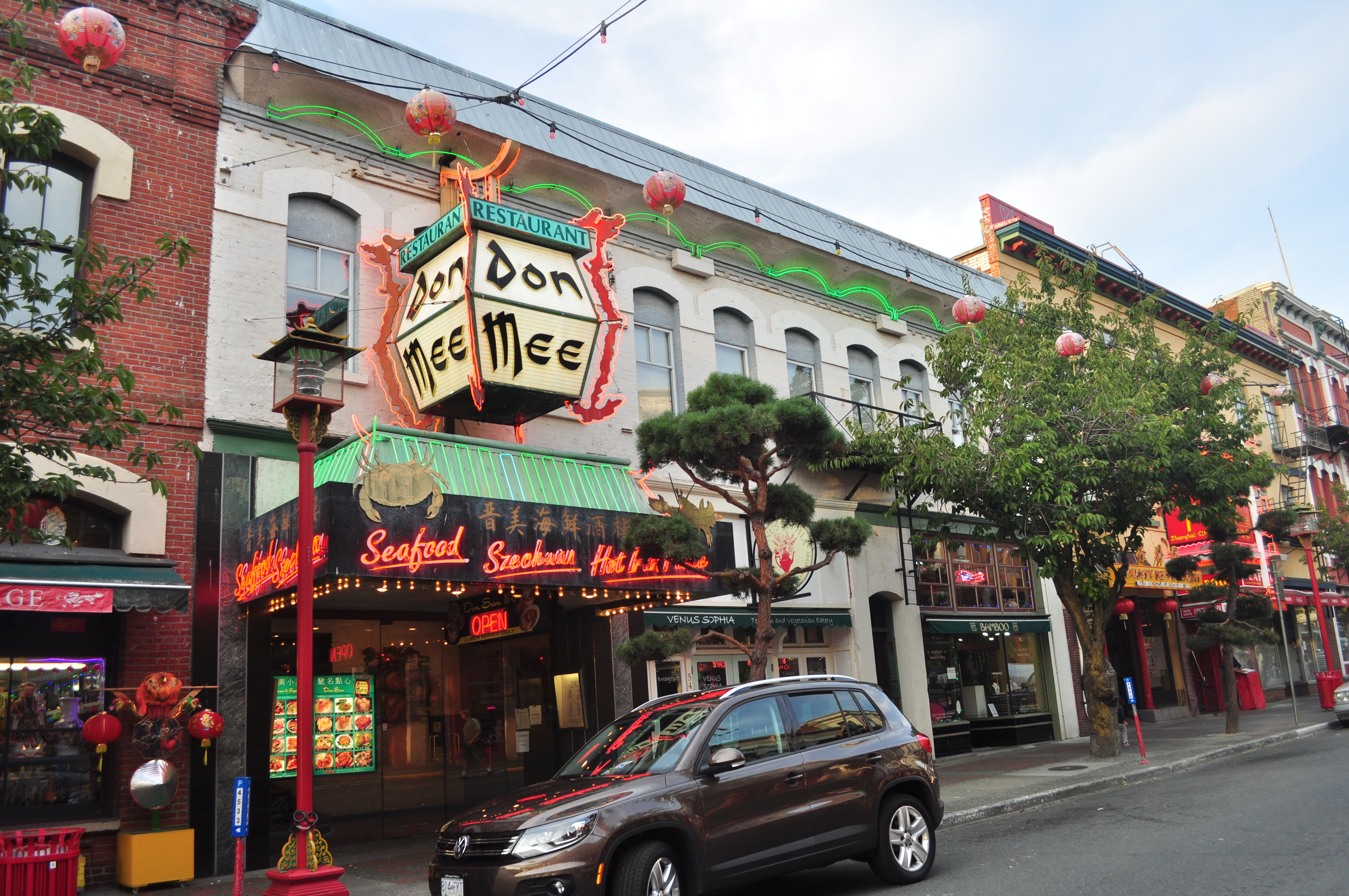
- The building's exterior in 2015
- Interactive map of the On Hing Building area

General information
- Type: Restaurant
- Location: 538 Fisgard Street, Victoria, British Columbia, Canada
- Completed: 1891
- Opened: 1901

Technical details
- Floor count: 3

The On Hing Building is an historic building in Victoria, British Columbia, Canada. It was built in 1891, but was only opened in 1901 according to BC Assessment e-value. It was always used for restaurants and commercial purposes.

== Heritage Significance ==
On Hing Building was added to the Canadian Register of Historic Places in 1995. It is also listed on the City of Victoria's Heritage Register as a municipally designated heritage building, underscoring its importance within the city's architectural and cultural landscape.

== See also ==
- List of historic places in Victoria, British Columbia
