= Icis =

ICIS can refer to:

- Integrated Cadastral Information Society, a non-profit organization
- International Conference on Information Systems, an annual academic conference in Information Systems
- Instrumentation, Control and Intelligent Systems, a distinctive signature organization in the Idaho National Laboratory
- Internal Counter-Intelligence Service, a fictional organization in the Doctor Who universe
