= Railway Belt (British Columbia) =

The Railway Belt was a region in the Canadian Province of British Columbia, following the main line of the Canadian Pacific Railway. It extended approximately 20 miles on either side of the railway. Although the land was initially under provincial control, the Government of British Columbia agreed to transfer control of the Railway Belt to the Government of Canada, as a condition of the British Columbia Terms of Entry into Confederation. The federal government then used the Railway Belt to further the building of the transcontinental railway, by granting portions of it to the CPR. The federal government also surveyed the Railway Belt under the Dominion Lands Survey.

The CPR had relied on selling the lands to settlers to assist in financing the construction of the railway, the same technique it used in the Prairie provinces. However, in British Columbia the route of the CPR went through the mountains. Most of the land in the Railway Belt was not arable and therefore was not very valuable for settlers. To assist in the financing, in 1883 the Province agreed to transfer another block of land, the Peace River Block, to the control of the federal Government, which in turn granted portions to the CPR for land development.

Federal control of the Railway Belt and the Peace River Block became an issue of controversy and provincial resentment after the CPR was built. Eventually, in 1930 the federal government agreed to transfer the Railway Belt and the Peace River Block back to the province. The transfer was done by the enactment of the Natural Resources Acts, passed by the Parliament of Canada and the Legislature of British Columbia, and then ratified by a constitutional amendment passed by the British Parliament.
