= Peace process (disambiguation) =

Peace process may refer to overall peace processes, or to:

== Phases of peace processes ==
- Peacemaking - non-military processes of stopping an intrastate or interstate armed conflict
- Peace enforcement - military processes of stopping an intrastate or interstate armed conflict
- Peacekeeping - the presence of neutral military forces to prevent armed conflict from restarting
- Peacebuilding - processes of sociological transformation for long-term prevention of recurrence of armed conflict

== Specific peace processes ==
- Category:Peace processes
- List of peace processes

== See also ==
- Peace treaty
- Process (disambiguation)
- Peace (disambiguation)
