= Institute for Agriculture and Trade Policy =

American think tank focused on sustainability in food

The historic Caroline Crosby House, 2105 First Avenue South, Minneapolis. Now home to the IATP.

The Institute for Agriculture and Trade Policy (IATP) is an international non-profit research and advocacy organization that promotes sustainable food, farm, and trade systems. IATP has offices in Minneapolis, Minnesota, Washington, D.C., Geneva, Switzerland and Berlin, Germany.

== Areas of work ==
IATP works to integrate sustainability throughout the food and farm system, from supporting farmers and the environment to securing universal access to healthy food. IATP identifies the impact trade agreements have on farmers, consumers and the environment, while promoting a fair trade system that supports locally based development, labor and human rights, and democratic institutions. IATP develops alternative economic models that integrate environmental sustainability into rural development.

== Timeline highlights ==
In 1987, IATP launched the Sustainable Agriculture Computer Network with email, access to shared data and research, news wire services, electronic conferencing and bulletin boards.

In 1990, IATP distributed Trading Away Our Future, a video on how General Agreement on Tariffs and Trade (GATT) affects American agriculture policy, to over 1,000 local organizers, opinion leaders and teachers.

In 1991, In New York, IATP conducted trainings and strategy coordination for 20 coalition partners in preparation for the United Nations Conference on Environment and Development.

In 1992, United Nations Conference on Environment and Development, more commonly known as the Earth Summit, met in Rio de Janeiro; IATP co-hosted the Global Forum on the GATT at the summit.

In 1995, IATP held a series of events nationwide with surviving founders of Bretton Woods and United Nations institutions, resulting in a [book of twenty essays] by the participants.

In 1996, IATP formed Peace Coffee in partnership with Guatemala’s Nobel Peace Prize winner Rigoberta Menchú.

In 1997, IATP incorporated TransFair USA, the first U.S. fair-trade certification body.

In 1998, IATP marked its 50th anniversary of the Universal Declaration of Human Rights with an event in New York City with Jesse Jackson, John Sweeney and others.

In 2000, with six other groups, IATP launched Genetically Engineered Food Alert to challenge the use of genetically engineered crops in food. During the same year, IATP launched Trade Information Project in Geneva to serve as an information clearinghouse on the World Trade Organization (WTO) for NGOs around the world.

In 2001, IATP created the Eat Well Guide, an online directory of sustainably raised meat, poultry, dairy and eggs available from North American farms, stores, restaurants and online merchants.

In 2005, IATP published a critique of the U.S. food aid system for undercutting local food systems in poor countries. The WTO holds its sixth ministerial in Hong Kong. IATP helped to organize the Fair Trade Fair and Symposium near the WTO meeting, to highlight the fair trade system for WTO delegates.

In 2006, IATP published a report, summarized in The New York Times, on the incidence of arsenic in U.S. poultry products.

In 2008, John Nichols of The Nation designated IATP the "Most Valuable Policy Group" in his Most Valuable Progressives of 2008 list.
and the Food and Society Fellows program moved to IATP, bringing together chefs, farmers, nutritionists, activists, public health professionals, fishers, policy experts and academics who work to create sustainable food systems.

In 2009, IATP released a report, Not So Sweet: Missing Mercury and High Fructose Corn Syrup, that examined the presence of mercury in high fructose corn syrup.

== History ==
Minnesota Secretary of State Mark Ritchie returned to the United States from a 1986 Geneva meeting and incorporated the Institute for Agriculture and Trade Policy as a nonprofit, tax-exempt organization, with the mission of fostering sustainable rural communities. In 1987, IATP began to organize and report on the newly launched round of international trade negotiations being conducted by the GATT, which eventually became the WTO. The rules of agricultural trade set in the GATT and implemented at the WTO have deeply influenced national and local farm policies around the globe over the last two decades.

In the 1990s, IATP expanded beyond its initial focus on international policymaking institutions like the WTO, and regional free trade agreements like the North American Free Trade Agreement, to include the promotion of positive alternatives to economically, socially and environmentally destructive agricultural and trade practices. For example, with the Center for Agriculture and the Environment in the Netherlands, IATP developed tools to help U.S. farmers increase their income by reducing on-farm fertilizer use.

Jim Harkness became IATP’s new president in 2006, after spending the previous 16 years in China, most recently as the Executive Director for the World Wildlife Fund in China. In 2014, Juliette Majot became the organization's third President, changing the title to Executive Director.
