= Land Title and Survey Authority =

Provincial crown corporation in British Columbia, Canada

The Land Title and Survey Authority of British Columbia (LTSA) is a publicly accountable, statutory corporation which operates and administers the land title and survey systems in British Columbia, Canada. The LTSA delivers secure land titles through timely, efficient registration of land title interests and survey records; these services are an essential underpinning to BC's private property market and the civil justice system, and to BC's civic governance, taxation and Crown land management frameworks.

The LTSA was established under the Land Title and Survey Authority Act in January 2005 and provides for the registration of all real property ownership and land interests, and all private and Crown land surveys through two divisions:

- Land Title Division – ensures the continued integrity of BC's Torrens title system for registering land titles. The LTSA's Land Title Offices verify ownership every time a property is sold, mortgaged, or other legal interests (known as charges) are created such as rights of way, mortgages, or liens. The LTSA's Land Title Register is BC's official legal record of private property ownership and contains over 2 million active titles to land and over 2 million active charges.
- Surveyor General Division – maintains the quality of the land survey structure of the Province and issues Crown Grant documents that transfer Crown land into private ownership.

A total of 13 stakeholder groups comprise the LTSA Stakeholder Advisory Committee, which advises the LTSA on a variety of matters. Many of the same entities with representatives on the Committee nominate members to the LTSA's board of directors. The LTSA also seeks guidance from several other stakeholder task forces, groups and committees.

== Accessing the LTSA's Services ==
Professional, business and government users primarily interface electronically with the LTSA through the myLTSA portal:

- The LTSA's Electronic Filing System (EFS) launched in 2004 enables authorized users (lawyers, notaries public and land surveyors) and other "Authorized Subscribers" such as statutory officers and eligible BC Commissioners to electronically submit land title documents and survey plans for registration. The secure nature of EFS is derived in large part by "electronic signatures", also known as "digital certificates", through a service offered by Juricert, a Law Society of British Columbia subsidiary. EFS is currently available on myLTSA Enterprise.
- The LTSA's Electronic Search Services offer registered users the ability to perform title searches and obtain copies of documents and survey plans. A full suite of search capabilities is available through myLTSA Enterprise, while searches for titles and related strata plans can be conducted through myLTSA Explorer.
- ParcelMap BC, developed in collaboration with the BC Government, BC Assessment, The Association of British Columbia Land Surveyors and the Integrated Cadastral Information Society, is a current, complete, and trusted visual representation of titled and Crown land parcels in British Columbia. ParcelMap BC integrates over two million parcels across the province and is one of the world's largest and most complex applications of survey-aware parcel fabric.

== Awards ==
In 2013, the LTSA won two awards for its three-year Business Modernization initiative:

- Innovator of the Year from BC Business Magazine.
- Team of the Year from the BC Tech Association.

In 2017, the LTSA's ParcelMap BC won national and international awards from Esri.

In 2018, LandSure Systems Ltd, an LTSA subsidiary, was selected as one of BC's Top Employers
