= Natural Resources Acts =

Laws of Canada respecting natural resources

Alberta Natural Resources Act; Railway Belt and Peace River Block Act; Manitoba Natural Resources Act; Saskatchewan Natural Resources Act

Parliament of Canada
- Long title: An Act respecting the transfer of the Natural Resources of Alberta; An Act respecting the transfer of the Railway Belt and the Peace River Block; An Act respecting the transfer of the Natural Resources of Manitoba; An Act respecting the transfer of the Natural Resources of Saskatchewan
- Citation: S.C. 1930, c. 3 [Alta.]; S.C, 1930, c. 37 [B.C.]; S.C. 1930, c. 29 [Man.]; S.C. 1930, c. 41 [Sask.]
- Enacted by: Parliament of Canada
- Assented to: 30 May 1930

Keywords
- Natural Resources Transfer Agreements; Constitution Act, 1930

Natural Resources Agreement Act
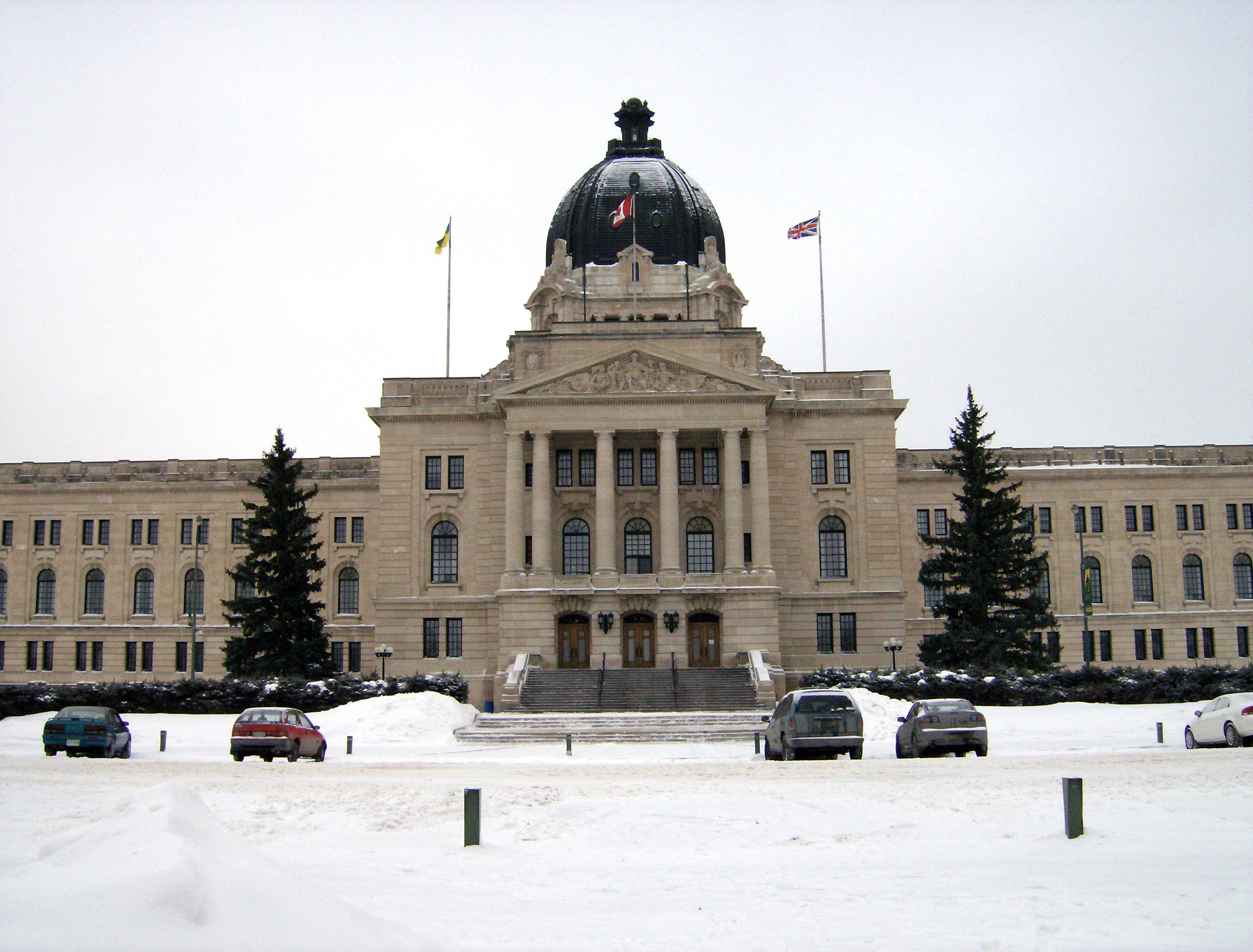

Legislative Assembly of Saskatchewan
- Long title: An Act to ratify a certain Agreement between the Government of the Dominion of Canada, represented therein by the Honourable Ernest Lapointe, Minister of Justice, and the Honourable Charles Stewart, Minister of the Interior, of the first part, and the Government of the Province of Saskatchewan, represented therein by the Honourable James Thomas Milton Anderson, Premier and Minister of Education of the Province, and the Honourable Murdoch Alexander MacPherson, Attorney-General, of the second part.
- Citation: SS 1930, c 87
- Enacted by: Legislative Assembly of Saskatchewan
- Assented to: 10 April 1930

Keywords
- Saskatchewan Natural Resources Transfer Agreement; Constitution Act, 1930

Manitoba Natural Resources Transfer Act
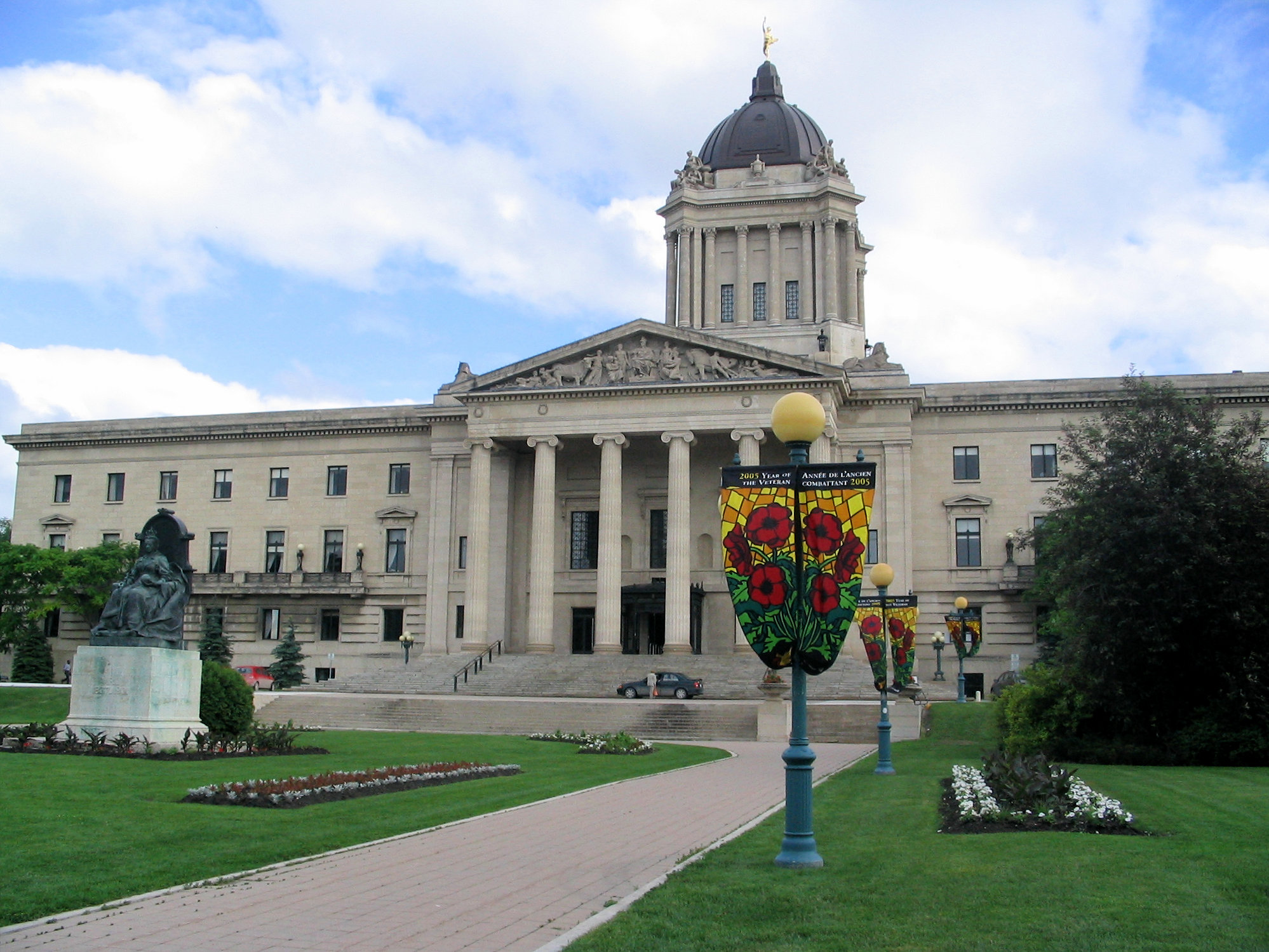

Legislative Assembly of Manitoba
- Long title: Manitoba Natural Resources Transfer Act
- Citation: C.C.S.M. c. N30
- Enacted by: Legislative Assembly of Manitoba

Keywords
- Manitoba Natural Resources Transfer Agreement; Constitution Act, 1930

Railway Belt Re-transfer Agreement Act
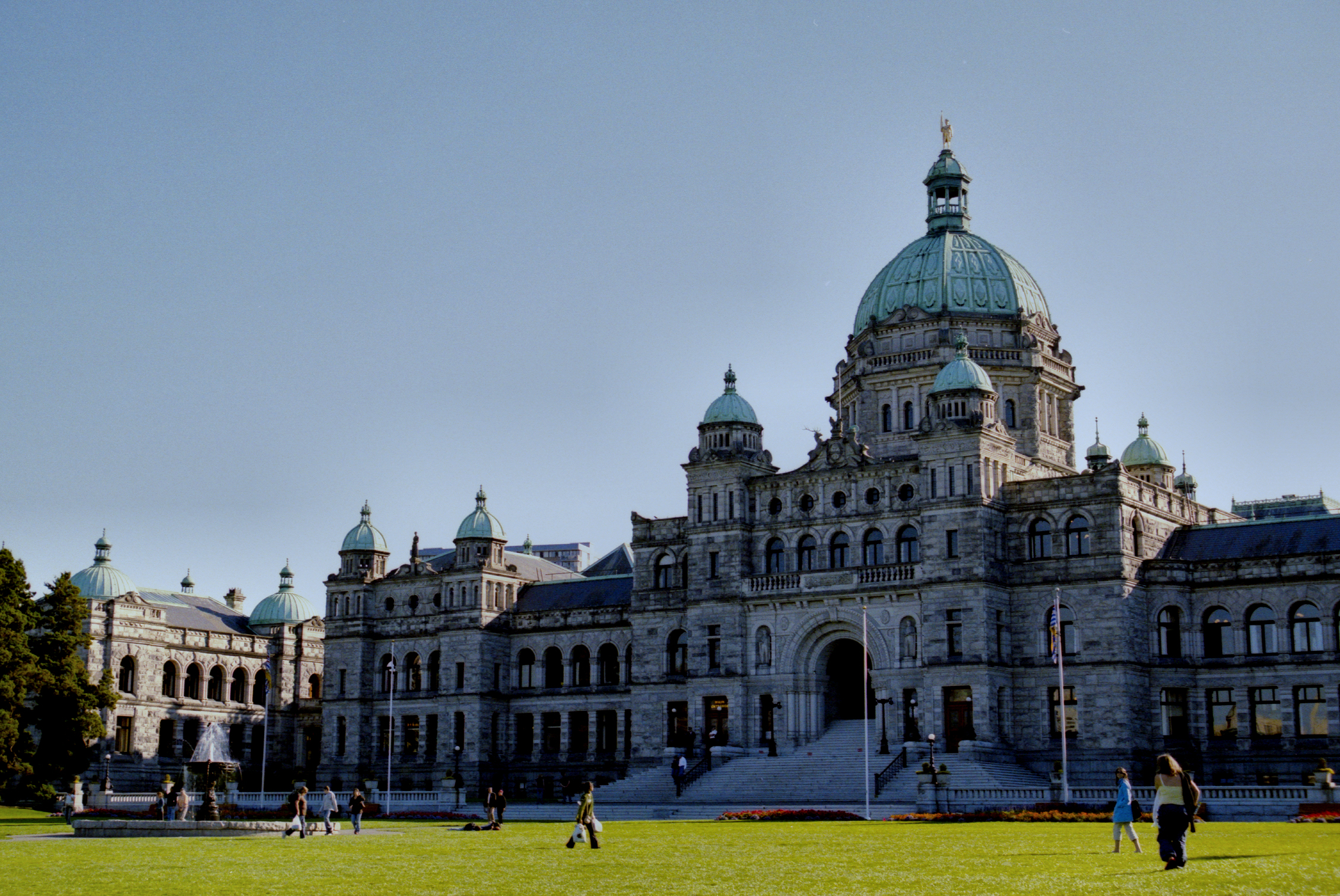

Legislative Assembly of British Columbia
- Long title: An Act to approve of an Agreement which has been arrived at between the Dominion and the Province respecting the Re-transfer of the Railway Belt and Peace River Block
- Citation: S.B.C. 1930, c. 60
- Territorial extent: British Columbia
- Enacted by: Legislative Assembly of British Columbia
- Assented to: 25 March 1930
- Commenced: 25 March 1930

Summary
- Approved an agreement between the Government of Canada and the Government of British Columbia concerning the retransfer of the Railway Belt and Peace River Block.

The Natural Resources Acts were a series of acts passed by the Parliament of Canada and the provinces of Alberta, British Columbia, Manitoba, and Saskatchewan in 1930 to transfer control over Crown lands and natural resources within these provinces from the Government of Canada to the provincial governments. Alberta, Manitoba and Saskatchewan had not been given control over their natural resources when they entered Confederation, unlike the other Canadian provinces. British Columbia had surrendered certain portions of its natural resources and Crown lands to the federal government, the Railway Belt and the Peace River Block, when it entered Confederation in 1871, as part of the agreement for the building of the transcontinental railway.

Following protracted negotiations, in 1930 the Government of Canada and the four provinces reached a series of agreements for the transfer of the administration of the natural resources to the provincial governments, called the Natural Resources Transfer Agreements. Parliament and the four provincial legislatures then passed acts to implement the agreements. Finally, the British Parliament passed the Constitution Act, 1930, to ratify the agreements, entrenching them in the Constitution of Canada. The passage of these acts rendered the Dominion Lands Act obsolete, since these same lands were no longer under federal jurisdiction.

A few small sections of resource-rich territory were excluded from the acts, although they were transferred later. First Nations reserves and lands reserved for indigenous persons were excluded under the Indian Act. National parks were also excluded — they remain under the jurisdiction of the federal government, and are generally off-limits to resource development.

== Impact on treaty rights ==
The Natural Resource Transfer Agreements with the three western provinces provide that laws respecting game in the province apply to Indians within the boundaries of the province. However, the rights granted to Indians under treaties to hunt, trap and fish are usually considered integral to the surrender of their lands, and are therefore maintained under the Transfer Agreement.
