= Esplanade Mountain =

Mountain in Alberta, Canada

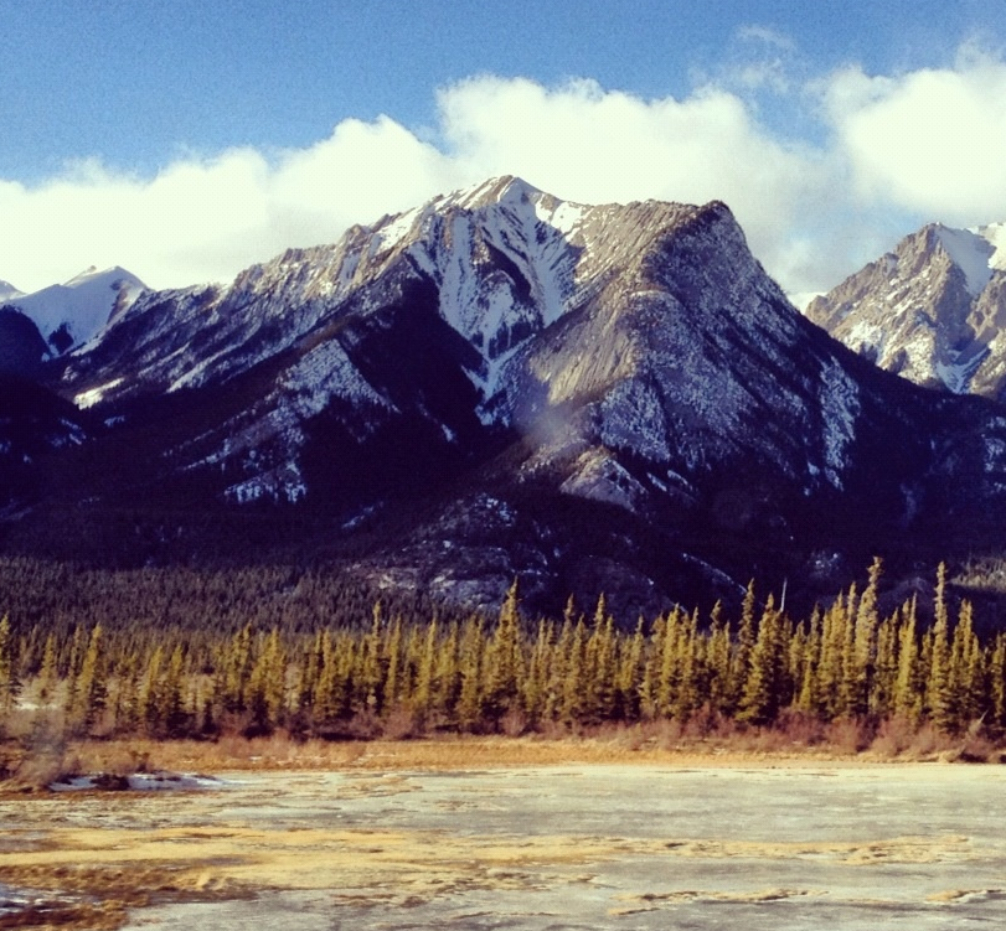
- Esplanade Mountain seen from Highway 16

Highest point
- Elevation: 2,301 m (7,549 ft)
- Prominence: 213 m (699 ft)
- Listing: Mountains of Alberta
- Coordinates: 53°04′35″N 118°09′12″W

Geography
- Location within Alberta Location within Canada
- Location: Jasper National Park; Alberta, Canada
- Parent range: Canadian Rockies
- Topo map: NTS 83E1 Snaring River

Geology
- Rock type: sedimentary rock

Esplanade Mountain is a 2,301-metre (7,549-foot) mountain summit located in Jasper National Park, in the Canadian Rockies of Alberta, Canada. The peak is situated 20 kilometres north of the municipality of Jasper, in the Athabasca Valley and is visible from Highway 16 and the Canadian. Its nearest higher peak is Cliff Mountain, 5.0 km (3.1 mi) to the west. Esplanade Mountain was named in 1916 by Morrison P. Bridgland for its long, flat top resembling an esplanade. Bridgland (1878-1948) was a Dominion Land Surveyor who named many peaks in Jasper Park and the Canadian Rockies. The mountain's name was officially adopted in 1956 by the Geographical Names Board of Canada.

== Climate ==
Based on the Köppen climate classification, Esplanade Mountain is located in a subarctic climate with cold, snowy winters, and mild summers. Temperatures can drop below -20 °C with wind chill factors below -30 °C. In terms of favorable weather, June through September are the best months to climb. Precipitation runoff from Esplanade Mountain flows into the Athabasca River.

== See also ==
- Geography of Alberta
