= Peace River (disambiguation) =

Peace River (French Rivière-la-Paix or Rivière de la Paix) is a river in British Columbia and Alberta. Peace River may also refer to:

== Canada ==
- Peace River Country, a geographic region straddling the border between British Columbia and Alberta
  - Peace River Block, a land grant of the Canadian Pacific Railway within the Peace River Country
  - Peace River oil sands, a large deposit of oil sands in the Peace River watershed.
- Peace River, Alberta, a town in northwest Alberta
- Peace River (federal electoral district), a federal electoral district in Alberta
- Peace River (provincial electoral district), a provincial electoral district in Alberta
- Peace River (British Columbia electoral district), a former provincial electoral district in British Columbia
- Peace River North, originally named North Peace River, a provincial electoral district in British Columbia
- Peace River South, originally named South Peace River, a provincial electoral district in British Columbia
- Peace River Regional District, a regional district in northeastern British Columbia
- Peace River (meteorite), a meteorite fallen in 1963 in Alberta

== United States ==
- Peace River (Dillingham) in Alaska, called Gui-guok-lok by natives
- Peace River (Nome) in Alaska, a tributary of the Koyuk River
- Peace River (Florida) in Florida

== See also ==
- Steamboats of the Peace River
