= Peace Butera =

Ugandan culinary artist

- Born: Peace Butera; Uganda
- Education: Makerere University Business School (Diploma in Hotel Management & Catering)
- Spouse: Vincent Butera
- Culinary career
- Cooking style: African, European
- Current restaurant
- Kampala Serena Hotel

Peace Nankunda Butera is a Ugandan culinary artist, who works as the Executive Sous Chef (second-in-command) at the Kampala Serena Hotel, a five-star establishment in Kampala, Uganda's capital and largest city. She is one of a handful of women in prominent professional culinary positions on the African continent.

== Background and education ==
She was born in a family of ten siblings. She was raised in various homes, within the extended family. She studied at the Uganda College of Commerce, in Nakawa, which today is the Makerere University Business School, graduating in 1992, with a Diploma in Hotel Management and Catering.

== Career ==
In 1993, she worked as an apprentice for three months, at the Nile Hotel in Kampala. The hotel hired her as a cook, after her training. In 2004, the hotel changed ownership and was renamed Kampala Serena Hotel. She was retained by the new owners. Peace Butera was selected to undergo training to become a chef through the internal program at the Serena Hotels Group. The training took her to ten Serena establishments in five African countries, as well as at five-star hotels in South Africa and Turkey. On her return to Kampala, she was appointed Sous chef at the Kampala Serena in 2005.

During the Commonwealth Heads of Government Meeting 2007, which was held in Kampala, from 23 to 25 November 2007, Queen Elizabeth II stayed at the Kampala Serena for four days. Chef Peace Butera was selected to prepare some of the Queen's menu items during that period. She has also, in the past, prepared meals for President Bill Clinton and his family.

== Family ==
Peace Butera is married to Vincent Butera and together are the parents of four children Kylie, Kelly, Lillian and Laban, two natural ones and two adopted ones.

== See also ==
- Walinda Jonathan
- List of hotels in Uganda
- Tourism in Uganda
