= Peace (surname) =

Peace as a surname may refer to:

- Charles Peace (1832–1879), English burglar and murderer
- Chris Peace (American football) (born 1995), American football player
- David Peace (born 1967), British author
- Doug Peace (1919–2000), Canadian cyclist
- Heather Peace (born 1975), English actress
- Jennifer Peace (military officer), U.S. Army captain
- Jennifer Howe Peace, American religious scholar
- Jeremy Peace (born 1956), English football club director
- Joe Raymond Peace (born 1945), American football player and coach
- Sir John Peace (born 1949), British businessman
- Larry Peace (1917–2009), American football player
- Jane Short (a.k.a. Rachel Peace) (1881 – died after 1932), British feminist and suffragette
- Robert Peace (1980–2011), the subject of The Short and Tragic Life of Robert Peace, a biography by Jeff Hobbs
- Robin Peace, social scientist from New Zealand
- Roger C. Peace (1899–1968), American politician from South Carolina; U. S. senator 1941
- Stephen Peace (born 1953), American politician from California; member of the State Assembly 1993–2002
- Warren Peace (contemporary), English vocalist, composer, and dancer
