= Peace River Block =

Land controlled by Government of Canada

Boundary of Peace River Block in northeastern British Columbia

The Peace River Block is a 3,500,000-acre (14,000 km^{2}) area of land in northeastern British Columbia, in the Peace River Country. In exchange for building a rail line across Canada to British Columbia, the Canadian Pacific Railway was given the Railway Belt, 20 miles (32 km) of land on each side of the railway. To compensate the CPR for alienated or non-arable land in the 40-mile-wide (64 km) strip, the province allowed the federal government to take control of 3,500,000 acres within British Columbia, northeast of the Rocky Mountains. This arrangement passed the provincial Legislature on December 19, 1883, and passed the Parliament of Canada on March 21, 1884, as the Settlement Act. All the land northeast of the Rocky Mountains became a provincial reserve pending the federal government's decision on what land to select, which prevented homesteading and land claims. After several surveys of the land, the government took possession of the Peace River Block in 1907. The land the government chose was an approximately square-shaped block of land 72.4 miles (116.5 km) north-south and 75.7 miles (121.8 km) east-west. The south boundary begins at the intersection of the Alberta-British Columbia border and the Twentieth Baseline of the Dominion Land Survey, and the north boundary begins at the Twenty-third Baseline; however, both boundaries are run at right angles to the Alberta-British Columbia Border without accounting for meridian convergence and thus deviate south of each baseline. Land within the block was initially surveyed using the 3rd and 4th Systems of the Dominion Land Survey; however, much of the south and west parts of the block were eventually surveyed into district lots similar to other parts of British Columbia.

The federal government opened the southeastern corner of the block in 1912 for homesteading. The federal government administered the land from two offices: the first was the Peace River Land Agency in Peace River, Alberta, and the second was the Grande Prairie Land Agency in Grande Prairie, Alberta. Land grants and sales to settlers, mineral rights, and management of forests on crown land were managed by the federal government, with the province providing roads, schools, and other normal provincial government services, in a manner similar to the Prairie Provinces. Conflicts occurred between the federal and provincial governments over jurisdiction over land, water, and mineral rights. An agreement was reached between the two governments on February 20, 1930, which returned the block and the Railway Belt to the provincial government at the same time that public land and mineral rights were transferred to the Prairie Provinces. The agreement was implemented by the Natural Resources Acts and the Constitution Act, 1930.

== See also ==
- Peace River (disambiguation)
- Land grant § Land grant railways
