= Peace Coffee =

- Company type: B Corporation
- Industry: Coffee
- Founded: 1996
- Headquarters: Minneapolis, Minnesota, United States
- Key people: Rigoberta Menchú Lee Wallace
- Products: Fair Trade Organic Coffee
- Owner: Lee Wallace, Kent Pilakowski
- Number of employees: 65
- Website: peacecoffee.com

Peace Coffee is an organization based in Minneapolis, Minnesota that sells organic, fair trade coffee. The company sells coffee through grocery, retail stores, food co-ops, and via the Internet. The organization operates throughout the United States with a strong presence in the Upper Midwest.

Peace coffee is one of 24 fair trade coffee roasters part of Cooperative Coffees.

== History ==
Peace Coffee was formed by the Institute for Agriculture and Trade Policy in 1996 The company also partnered with Rigoberta Menchú. The idea for Peace Coffee came from Mexican coffee producers who had the goal of selling 100% certified organic and fair trade coffee. In 1999, Peace Coffee joined the group Cooperative Coffees. Currently, Cooperative Coffees has partnered with 20 different coffee-growing cooperatives in the countries of Mexico, Guatemala, Nicaragua, Peru, Ethiopia, and Rwanda.

In early 2018 the company was purchased from IATP by long time CEO Lee Wallace and her business partner, Kent Pilakowski.

== Coffee sourcing ==
Peace Coffee sources coffee in two distinct ways.

The organization partners with larger coffee-growing co-operatives that are fair-trade certified rather than individual farmers. Groups such as Oromia Coffee Farmers Cooperative Union, which have over 10,000 members, allow for economies of scale to exist while maintaining a farmer friendly attitude. Co-operatives are necessary due to the high scale of demand from a large company like Peace Coffee. The disadvantages of not working directly with these farmers include less direct control over farming practices such as harvesting and processing improvements. Although Peace Coffee does consistently travel the countries of origin, visiting their co-ops at least once every two years, they do not have the same influence on cup quality because of the larger number of growers.

Peace Coffee also founded its own coffee importing cooperative with other roasters in 1999. Since then, Peace Coffee has imported coffee from cooperative farming groups that support small-scale farmers around the world. Being an owner and importer gives the organization increased access and transparency in the supply chain. Peace Coffee publishes contracts with its coffee farmers on its website Fair Trade Proof.

== Reception ==
Peace Coffee received publicity after rapper/actor Ice Cube mentioned that he often made Peace Coffee in the morning in an interview with Bon Appétit magazine.

== Energy efficiency ==
Peace Coffee has a mantra "pedal not petrol", which refers to the company's policy of using bicycle couriers to deliver their product to stores, coffee shops, and food co-ops. While the company uses the bicycle couriers within the cities, it purchased a biodiesel van for deliveries to the suburbs and out of state.
