= Peace River (meteorite) =

Meteorite found in Canada

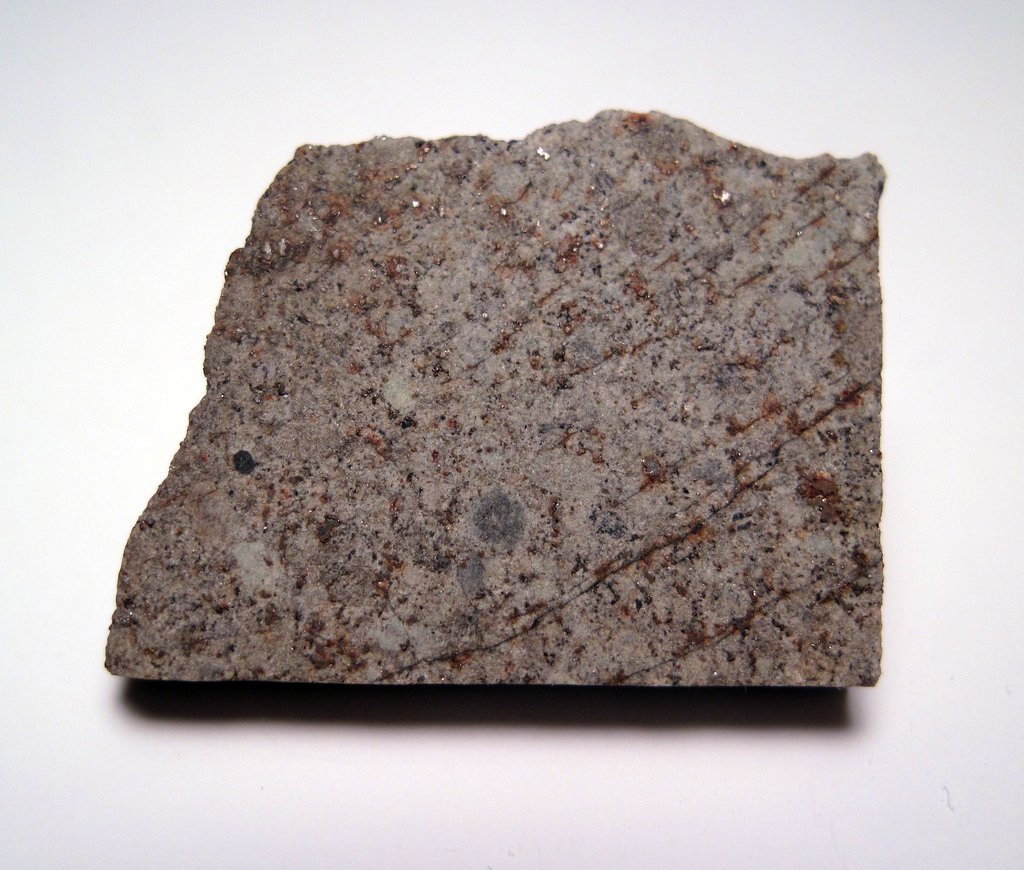
- Peace River slice
- Type: Chondrite
- Class: Ordinary chondrite
- Group: L6
- Country: Canada
- Region: Alberta
- Coordinates: 56°8′N 117°56′W
- Observed fall: Yes
- Fall date: March 31, 1963
- TKW: 45.76 kg (1964)
- Strewn field: Yes

Peace River is a small L6 chondrite meteorite that detonated over Alberta, Canada on the morning of March 31, 1963.

== History ==
On March 31, 1963, at 4:35 a.m. MST, a small meteoroid detonated at a height of 13 kilometres (8.1 mi) over the skies of Alberta, Canada and broke in two main fragments. A bright flash was visible at a distance of over 100 miles (160 km) and strong booming detonations were heard.

As soon as enough data was obtained and the snow melted, the search for the fragments began. The first fragment was recovered on April 24 near Mahood farm, 39 kilometres (24 mi) southwest of Peace River town, by John Westgate and R. E. Folinsbee.

== Strewnfield ==
The ellipse of scattering spawn for about 8 kilometres (5.0 mi) in length.

== Classification ==
It was classified as shocked L6 chondrite.

== See also ==
- Glossary of meteoritics
