= Walinda Jonathan =

Ugandan chef and baker (born 2001)

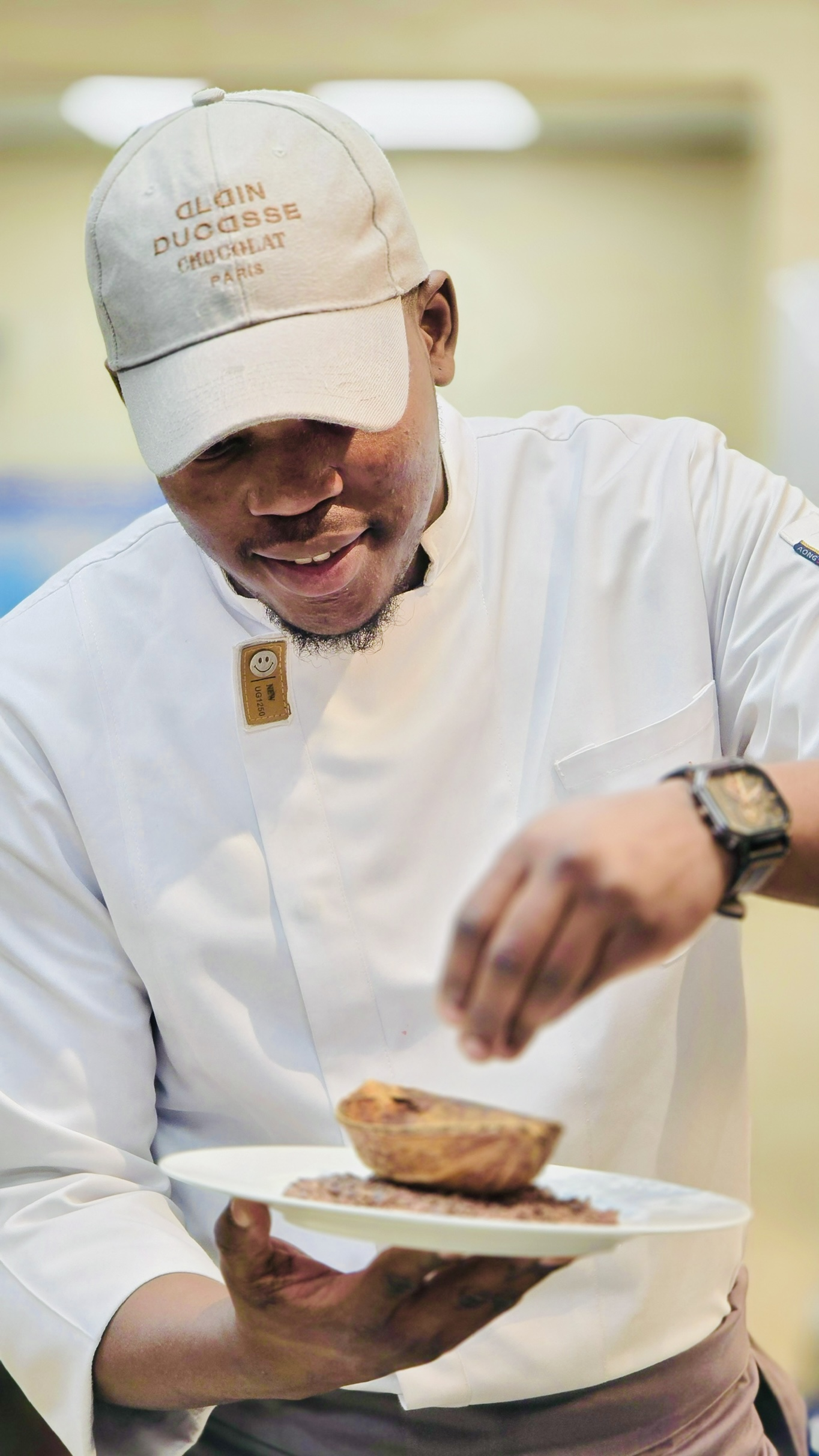
- Walinda Jonathan putting cocao nibs on a cocoa pod at Alain Ducasse Riyadh
- Born: January 15, 2001 (age 25); Kakiri, Wakiso District, Uganda
- Occupations: Chef, baker
- Employer: Alain Ducasse Riyadh (since 2025)
- Known for: First Ugandan bakery-focused chef verified on TikTok; Blending traditional Ugandan flavours with contemporary baking techniques; Artisanal pastry and bakery creations

Walinda Jonathan (born January 15 2001) is a Ugandan chef and baker currently based in Riyadh, Saudi Arabia.

== Personal life ==
Jonathan was born on 15 January 2001 to Francis Walinda and Norah Namuddu in Kakiri, Wakiso District, Uganda.

== Education ==
Jonathan studied at Kakiri Secondary School before starting his career.

== Professional and career journey ==
Jonathan's career began at an early age, with a focus on baking, where his use of local Ugandan ingredients and contemporary presentation quickly gained attention. He bakes artisanal breads, pastries, and bespoke cakes.

His cooking philosophy focuses on celebrating African flavours while blending them with modern baking techniques to appeal to diverse palates. This led to the development of the WJ Afro Method, which combines elements of classical French pastry techniques with flavours and ingredients drawn from Ugandan cuisine.

He initially worked as a bakery chef at NUA Restaurant in Almadina Heritage, where he showcased his creative culinary style.

In late 2025, Jonathan joined the team of Alain Ducasse in Riyadh, working within the culinary group led by Alain Ducasse.

Jonathan also produces detailed educational content on dough fermentation, lamination, pastry design, and modern baking techniques, which has attracted a wide audience across East Africa, the Gulf region, and parts of Europe, helping demystify fine pastry craftsmanship for young chefs. This led to his TikTok account being verified as that of the first East African bakery chef.

== Recognitions and awards ==
In January 2025, Jonathan was nominated for a Pan-African Chef Award in the chef category and became the first East African chef to be recognised in the continental honours. In March 2026, he was named the winner of the 2026 Pan-African Chef Award.

He has been recognised as an ambassador for African culinary innovation for blending local inspiration with world-class technique.
