= BC Assessment Authority =

Professional valuation organization

The British Columbia Assessment Authority
- Company type: Crown Corporation
- Founded: 1974; 52 years ago
- Area served: British Columbia
- Website: www.bcassessment.ca

The British Columbia Assessment Authority is a publicly owned Crown Corporation in the Province of British Columbia, Canada. BC Assessment was created in 1974, as a result of a provincial government all-party committee unanimous recommendation that an independent assessment agency be created.

Its mandate is to provide property assessment values for property owners in the province. This information is primarily used in the calculation of property tax payable to the provincial government or relevant municipality in British Columbia. In 2009, some $6 billion (CAD) was raised in B.C. from property tax levies. In 2009, the total value of assessments in the province were $969 billion. By 2010, that number had grown to $1.04 trillion. Most assessments are of the market value of the real property.

In 2009 (for the 2010 roll), assessment appeals remained low, compared to many other property-taxing provinces and states. Some 98.5% of assessments were accepted without appeal.

BC Assessment has approximately 650 full-time staff positions in 17 offices throughout the province. B.C. Assessment's annual budget is just over $77 million.
