= Dominion Land Survey =

Survey method used in most of western Canada

The Dominion Land Survey (DLS; French: arpentage des terres fédérales, ATF) is the method used to divide most of Western Canada into one-square-mile (2.6 km^{2}) sections for agricultural and other purposes. It is based on the layout of the Public Land Survey System used in the United States, but has several differences. The DLS is the dominant survey method in the Prairie provinces, and it is also used in British Columbia along the Railway Belt (near the main line of the Canadian Pacific Railway), and in the Peace River Block in the northeast of the province. Although British Columbia entered Confederation with control over its own lands (unlike the Northwest Territories and the Prairie provinces), British Columbia transferred these lands to the federal Government as a condition of the building of the Canadian Pacific Railway. The federal government then surveyed these areas under the DLS.

== History ==
The survey was begun in 1871, shortly after Manitoba and the North-West Territories became part of Canada, following the purchase of Rupert's Land from the Hudson's Bay Company. Covering about 800,000 square kilometres (310,000 sq mi), the survey system and its terminology are deeply ingrained in the rural culture of the Prairies. The DLS is the world's largest survey grid laid down in a single integrated system. The first formal survey done in western Canada was by Peter Fidler in 1813.

The inspiration for the Dominion Land Survey System was the plan for Manitoba (and later Saskatchewan and Alberta) to be agricultural economies. With a large number of European settlers arriving, Manitoba was undergoing a large change so grasslands and parklands were surveyed, settled, and farmed. The Dominion Land Survey system was developed because the farm name and field position descriptions used in northern Europe were not organized or flexible enough, and the township and concession system used in eastern Canada was not satisfactory. The first meridian was chosen at 97°27′28.4″ west longitude and was established in 1869. Another six meridians were established after.

A number of places are excluded from the survey system: these include federal lands such as First Nation reserves, federal parks, and air weapon ranges. The surveys do not encroach on reserves because that land was established before the surveys began. When the Hudson's Bay Company relinquished its title to the Dominion on July 15, 1870, via the Deed of Surrender, it received Section 8 and all of Section 26 excluding the northeast quarter. These lands were gradually sold by the company and in 1984 they donated the remaining 5,100 acres (21 km^{2}) to the Saskatchewan Wildlife Association.

The surveying of western Canada was divided into five basic surveys. Each survey's layout was slightly different from the others. The first survey began in 1871 and ended in 1879 and covers some of southern Manitoba and a little of Saskatchewan. The second and smallest survey, in 1880, was used in only small areas of Saskatchewan. This system differs from the first survey because rather than running section lines parallel to the eastern boundary they run true north–south. The largest and most important of these surveys was the third, which covers more land than all the other surveys put together. This survey began in 1881. That method of surveying is still used in Saskatchewan and Manitoba. The fourth and fifth surveys were used only in some townships in British Columbia.

The reason that the Canadian government was pushing to subdivide Manitoba, Saskatchewan, and Alberta was to affirm Canadian sovereignty over these lands. The United States was undergoing rapid expansion in the 1860s, and the Canadian government was afraid that the Americans would expand into Canadian territory. Canada's introduction of a railway and surveying was a means to discourage American encroachment. Sir John A. Macdonald remarked in 1870 that the Americans "are resolved to do all they can short of war, to get possession of our western territory, and we must take immediate and vigorous steps to counteract them."

The beginning of the Dominion Land Survey marked a new era for western Canada. Railways were making their way to the West and the population of western regions began to increase. The introduction of the survey system marked the end of the nomadic ways for the First Nations and Metis. This did not go over well and was a catalyst to the events of the Red River Rebellion.

Being a surveyor was not easy. The hours were long, the time away from civilization was longer, and the elements were unforgiving. A survey party generally consisted of up to 20 members, which would include a party chief, chain men, a cook, people to saw trees, a recorder, and people to turn angles. All travel was either on horseback or by foot. To begin surveying, a party chief would have to buy approximately $400 worth of instruments. These instruments included an alidade, dumpy level, theodolite, Gunter's chain (which was replaced by a steel tape), and a solar compass or a Vernier compass.

The Dominion Land Survey system was proposed in 1869 by John Stoughton Dennis. The initial plan, though based on the square townships of the American Public Lands Survey System, involved 9-mile townships divided into sixty-four 800-acre sections consisting of four 200-acre lots each. Work to establish the first meridian and few township outlines began and quickly ended in 1869 when a party of Metis symbolically stepped on a survey chain, beginning the Red River Resistance. Work resumed in 1871; however, the system was redesigned to use 6-mile townships with 640-acre sections based on a suggestion from Lieutenant-Governor of the North-West Territories William McDougall, who advocated that most of the settlers would come from the United States, so it was "advisable to offer them lots of a size to which they have been accustomed." The Dominion Land Survey System still differed from the Public Land System because it contained road allowances.

The Dominion Land Survey was enormous. Around 178,000,000 acres (720,000 km^{2}) are estimated to have been subdivided into quarter sections, 27 million of which were surveyed by 1883 (14 years after the system's inception). The amount of work undertaken between 1871 and 1930 is given justice by the amount of paperwork submitted: the maps, plans, and memos transferred by the Canadian government to the provinces filled approximately 200 railway cars. This did not include closed or dormant files, which would fill 9,000 filing cabinets and weigh about 227 tons.

Until very recently, surveying to take distance and angular measurements was done with manually controlled instruments. Distance was measured using either a chain or more recently a transit or range finder. To turn angles, a theodolite was used. To find their location, they used astronomical observations, and to find elevation, levels and barometers were used. To see over long distances, towers were constructed from timber in flat and wooded areas.

== Meridians and baselines ==
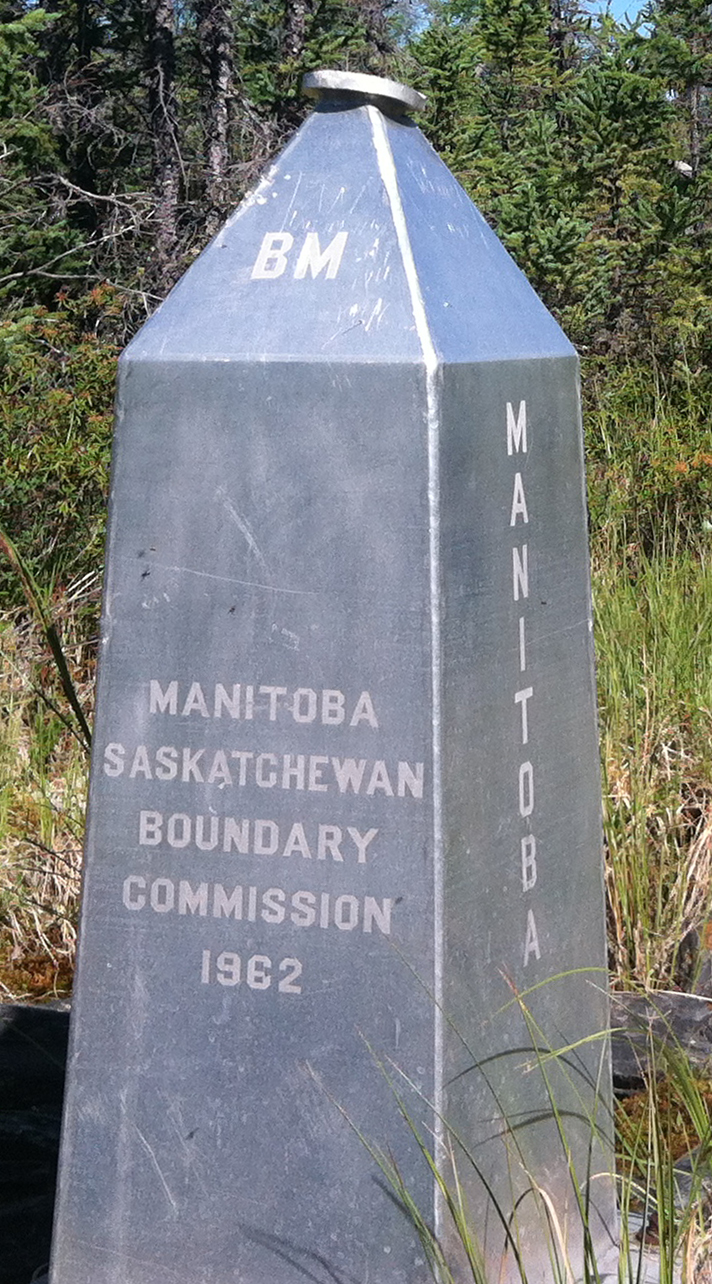
This monument marks the north end of the Second Meridian

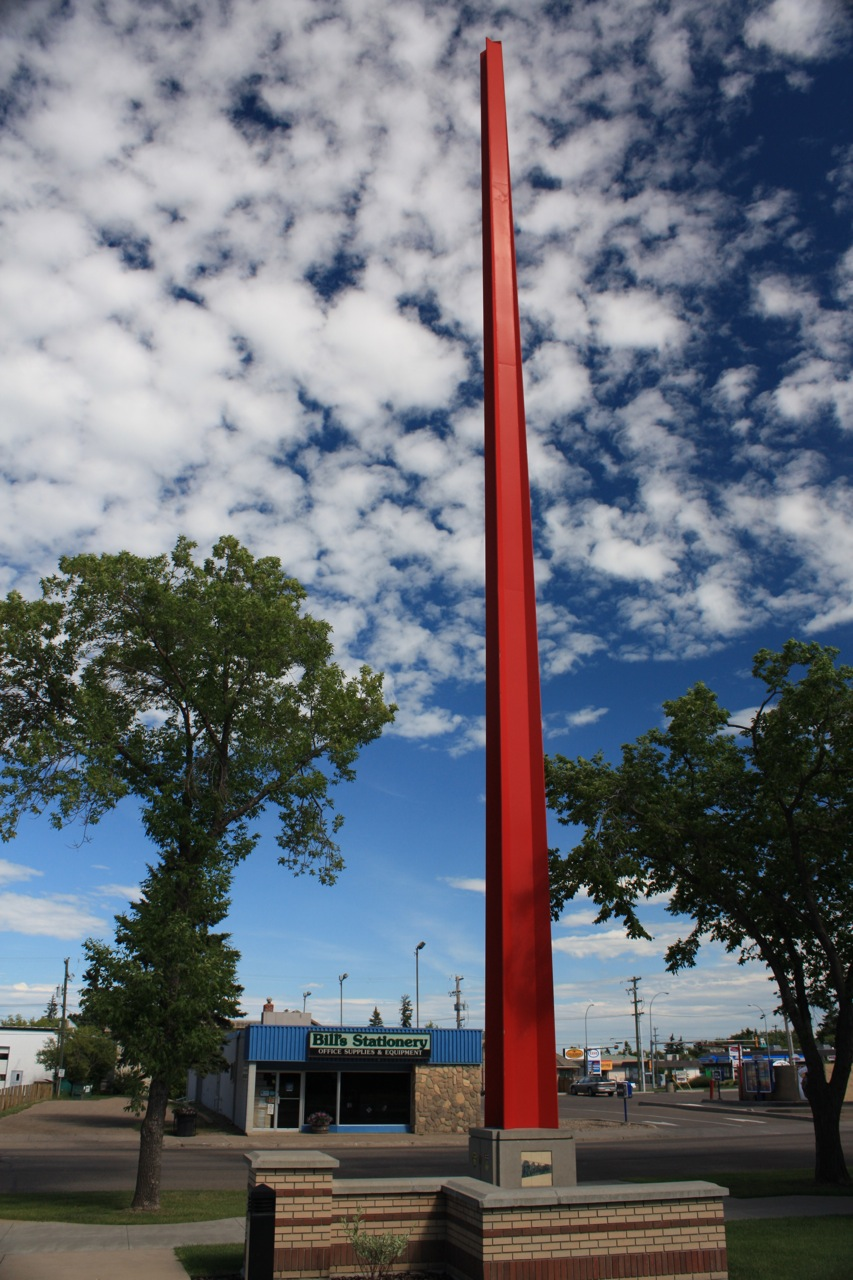
A border marker in Lloydminster

The most important north–south lines of the survey are the meridians:

- The First (also Principal or Prime) Meridian at 97°27′28.41″ west, just west of Winnipeg, Manitoba. Its southern end is exactly ten miles west of where the Red River crosses the border from the United States into Canada.
- The Second Meridian at 102° west, which forms the northern part of the Manitoba–Saskatchewan boundary.
- The Third Meridian at 106° west, near Moose Jaw and Prince Albert, Saskatchewan.
- The Fourth Meridian at 110° west, which forms the Saskatchewan–Alberta boundary and bisects Lloydminster.
- The Fifth Meridian at 114° west, which runs through Calgary (Barlow Trail is built mostly on the meridian) and Stony Plain, Alberta (48th Street).
- The Sixth Meridian at 118° west, near Grande Prairie, Alberta, and Revelstoke, British Columbia.
- The Seventh Meridian at 122° west, between Hope and Vancouver, British Columbia (Lickman Rd, Chilliwack).
- The Coast Meridian at approximately 122°45′ west, originally established before British Columbia joined the Confederation, was surveyed north from the point where the 49th parallel intersects the sea at Semiahmoo Bay. 168th Street in Surrey is built mainly on the meridian.
- The Second Meridian East at 94° west, which covers part of northeastern Manitoba.

The meridians were determined by painstaking survey observations and measurements, and in reference to other benchmarks on the continent, but were determined using 19th-century technology. The only truly accurate benchmarks at that time were near the prime meridian in Europe. Benchmarks in other parts of the world had to be calculated or estimated by the positions of the sun and stars. Consequently, although they were remarkably accurate for the time, today they are known to be several hundred metres in error. Before the survey was even completed it was established that for the purposes of laws based on the survey, the results of the physical survey would take precedence over the theoretically correct position of the meridians. This precludes, for example, any basis for a boundary dispute between Alberta and Saskatchewan on account of surveying errors.

The main east–west lines are the baselines. The First Baseline is at 49° north, which forms much of the Canada–United States border in the West. Each subsequent baseline is about 24 miles (39 km) to the north of the previous one, terminating at 60° north, which forms the boundary with Yukon, the Northwest Territories, and Nunavut.

== Townships ==
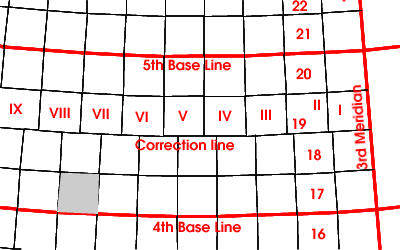
A part of the Dominion Land Survey (convergence of meridians exaggerated). The shaded township is Township 17, Range 8 west of the Third Meridian.

Starting at each intersection of a meridian and a baseline and working west (also working east of the First Meridian and the Coast Meridian), nearly square townships were surveyed, whose north–south and east–west sides are about 6 miles (9.7 km) in length. There are two tiers of townships to the north and two tiers to the south of each baseline.

Because the east and west edges of townships, called "range lines", are meridians of longitude, they converge towards the North Pole. Therefore, the north edge of every township is slightly shorter than the south. Only along the baselines do townships have their nominal width from east to west. The two townships to the north of a baseline gradually narrow as one moves north, and the two to the south gradually widen as one moves south. Halfway between two base lines, wider-than-nominal townships abut narrower-than-nominal townships. The east and west boundaries of these townships therefore do not align, and north–south roads that follow the survey system have to jog to the east or west. These east–west lines halfway between baselines are called "correction lines".

Townships are designated by their "township number" and "range number". Township 1 is the first north of the First Baseline, and the numbers increase to the north. Range numbers recommence with Range 1 at each meridian and increase to the west (also east of First Meridian and Coast Meridian). On maps, township numbers are marked in Arabic numerals, but range numbers are often marked in Roman numerals; however, in other contexts Arabic numerals are used for both. Individual townships are designated such as "Township 52, Range 25 west of the Fourth Meridian," abbreviated "52-25-W4." In Manitoba, the First Meridian is the only one used, so the abbreviations are even more terse, e.g., "3-1-W" and "24-2-E.". In Manitoba legislation, the abbreviations WPM and EPM are used: "3-1 WPM" and "2N4-2 EPM".

== Sections ==
Every township is divided into 36 sections, each about 1 mile (1.6 km) square. Sections are numbered within townships beginning with the southeast section and continuing in a snaking pattern until reaching the northeast corner (in contrast to the US which starts from the northeast), as follows (north at top):

31	32	33	34	35	36
30	29	28	27	26	25
19	20	21	22	23	24
18	17	16	15	14	13
7	8	9	10	11	12
6	5	4	3	2	1

In turn, each section is divided into four quarter sections (square land parcels roughly 1/2 mi [800 m] on a side): southeast, southwest, northwest and northeast. This quarter-section description is primarily used by the agricultural industry. The full legal description of a particular quarter section is "the Northeast Quarter of Section 20, Township 52, Range 25 west of the Fourth Meridian", abbreviated "NE-20-52-25-W4."

A section may also be split into as many as 16 legal subdivisions (LSDs). LSDs are commonly used by the oil and gas industry as a precise way of locating wells, pipelines, and facilities. LSDs can be "quarter-quarter sections" (square land parcels roughly 1/4 mi [400 m] on a side, comprising roughly 40 acres [160,000 m^{2}] in area)—but this is not necessary. Many are other fractions of a section (a half-quarter section—roughly 80 acres [320,000 m^{2}] in area is common). LSDs may be square, rectangular, and occasionally even triangular. LSDs are numbered as follows (north at top):

13	14	15	16
12	11	10	9
5	6	7	8
4	3	2	1

Occasionally, resource companies assign further divisions within LSDs such as "A, B, C, D, etc." for example, to distinguish between multiple sites within an LSD. These in no way constitute an official change to the Dominion Land Survey system, but nonetheless often appear as part of the legal description.

In summary, the hierarchy of the division of Western Canada went as follows:

- Province
  - Township (composed of 36 sections)
    - Sections (composed of 4 quarter sections or 16 legal subdivisions)
      - Quarter sections
      or
      - Legal subdivisions

== Road allowances ==
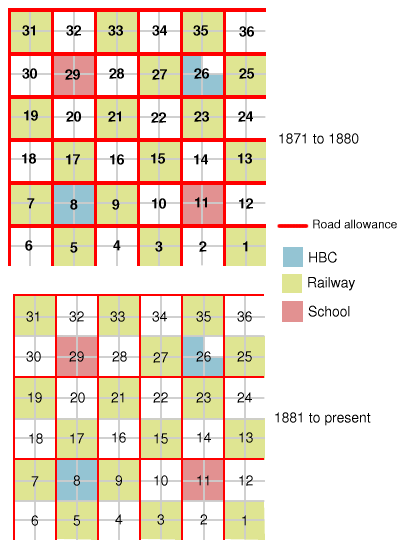
Road allowances and special sections in the Dominion Land Survey.

Between certain sections of a township run "road allowances" (but not all road allowances have an actual road built on them). The road allowances add to the size of the township (they do not cut down the size of the sections): this is the reason base lines are not exactly 24 miles (39 km) apart. In townships surveyed from 1871 to 1880 (most of southern Manitoba, part of southeastern Saskatchewan and a small region near Prince Albert, Saskatchewan), there are road allowances of 1 1/2 chains (30 m) surrounding every section. In townships surveyed from 1881 to the present, road allowances are reduced both in width and in number. They are 1 chain (20 m) wide and run north–south between all sections; however, there are only three east–west road allowances in each township, on the north side of sections 7 to 12, 19 to 24 and 31 to 36. This results in a north–south road allowance every mile going west, and an east–west road allowance every two miles going north. This arrangement reduced land allocation for roads, but still provides road-access to every quarter-section. Road allowances are one of the differences between the Canadian DLS and the American Public Land Survey System, which leaves no extra space for roads.

== Special sections ==
=== Hudson's Bay Company ===
As part of the deal that transferred Rupert's Land from the Hudson's Bay Company to Canada, the HBC retained five per cent of the "fertile belt" (south of the North Saskatchewan and Winnipeg rivers). Therefore, Section 8 and three-quarters of Section 26 were assigned to the company. Additionally, the fourth quarter of Section 26 in townships whose numbers were divisible by five also belonged to the HBC in order to give the company exactly five per cent. Although the HBC sold all these sections long ago, they are still often locally called "the Bay section" today.

=== Railroads ===
Resulting in a "checkerboard pattern", odd-numbered sections (except 11 and 29) were often used for railway land-grants. The Prairies could not be settled without railways, so the Dominion government habitually granted large tracts of land to railway companies as an incentive to build lines. Notably, the Canadian Pacific Railway was granted 25,000,000 acres (100,000 km^{2}) for the construction of its first line from Ontario to the Pacific. These sections are colloquially called CPR sections regardless of the railway they were originally granted to.

=== Education ===
Sections 11 and 29 were school sections. When school boards were formed, they gained title to these sections, which were then sold to fund the initial construction of schools. The rural school buildings were as often as not located on school sections; frequently, land trades were made between landowners and the school for practical reasons.

=== Homesteads ===
The remaining quarter sections were available as homesteads under the provisions of the Dominion Lands Act, the federal government's plan for settling the North-West. A homesteader paid a CA$10 fee for a quarter section of his choice. If after three years he had cultivated 30 acres (12 ha) and had built a house (often just a sod house), he gained title to the quarter. Homesteads were available as late as the 1950s, but the bulk of the settlement of the Prairies was 1885 to 1914.

Legal surveys conducted before and after the Dominion Land Survey grid was laid out often have their own legal descriptions and delineations. Early settlement lots still retain their own original legal descriptions, but often have townships superimposed over them for the sake of convenience or for certain tasks. Urban developments superimpose new survey lots and plans over the older section and township grid also.

== Political disputes over the survey ==
Certain areas otherwise within the surveys' boundaries were not part of the survey grid, or not available for homesteading. These were Indian reserves, pre-existing "settlements" divided into "river lots" based on the French system used in Quebec, and lands around Hudson's Bay Company trading posts reserved for the company when it transferred its claim over the West to Canada in 1870.

The rights of the pre-DLS settlers was a major political issue in the West in the late nineteenth century. The settlers claimed squatters' rights over the land they had already farmed, but the sizes and boundaries of these farms were poorly defined, leading to frequent disputes. As well the Métis in the Southbranch settlements of Saskatchewan were particularly concerned with their land rights given that they had not been well protected by the Manitoba Act as they had been promised in 1870. In the case of the closely clustered settlements of Edmonton, St. Albert, and Fort Saskatchewan in the Alberta District, a militant "settlers' rights" movement developed which demanded action from the federal government to grant the settlers legal title to their land and to end claim jumping. The movement even resorted to vigilante action against suspected claim jumpers. Most of these grievances were resolved by 1885, which is likely one of the reasons the area never joined the North-West Rebellion despite the fact that St. Albert, and to a lesser extent Edmonton, were largely populated by Métis people.

== See also ==
- Alberta Township System
- Concession road
- Public Land Survey System (United States)
- Section (United States land surveying)
- The Association of British Columbia Land Surveyors
