= British Columbia Highway 52 =

Highway in British Columbia

Highway 52
- Heritage Highway

Route information
- Maintained by the Ministry of Transportation and Infrastructure
- Length: 243 km (151 mi)
- Existed: 1986–present

Major junctions
- West end: Highway 97 at Arras
- Highway 29 in Tumbler Ridge
- East end: Highway 2 at Tupper

Location
- Country: Canada
- Province: British Columbia

Highway system
- British Columbia provincial highways
← Highway 49	→ Highway 62

Highway 52, known locally as the Heritage Highway, is a 243 km (151 mi) long alternate loop route between Arras, on the John Hart Highway just west of Dawson Creek, and Tupper, on the B.C.-Alberta boundary, via the community of Tumbler Ridge, 98 km (61 mi) south of Arras and 145 km (90 mi) south of Tupper. The highway to Arras was first given the number 52 in 1988, and the highway to Tupper received the same number in the late 1990s.

In addition to Tumbler Ridge, the Heritage Highway provides access to Bearhole Lake Provincial Park and Protected Area and One Island Lake Provincial Park.

The highway is mainly chip-seal, except for a 36 km section which is gravel. It has many steep grades and sharp turns.

== Major intersections ==
Traveling clockwise. The entire route is in Peace River Regional District.

Location	km	mi	Destinations	Notes
Arras	0.00	0.00	Highway 97 – Chetwynd, Dawson Creek, Fort St. John	Counterclockwise terminus
Tumbler Ridge	98.51	61.21	Highway 29 – Chetwynd	
Tupper	242.91	150.94	Highway 2 – Dawson Creek, Fort St. John, Grande Prairie	Clockwise terminus; road continues as 203 Road
1.000 mi = 1.609 km; 1.000 km = 0.621 mi
