= Dowling Creek =

Dowling Creek may refer to:

- Dowling Creek (British Columbia), Canada
- Dowling Creek (Missouri), United States
