= Kiskatinaw =

Kiskatinaw may refer to:

- Kiskatinaw River, a river in British Columbia, Canada
- Kiskatinaw Provincial Park, a park in British Columbia, Canada
- Kiskatinaw Formation, a stratigraphical unit in the Western Canadian Sedimentary Basin
