= Tumbler Ridge =

Community in British Columbia, Canada

- District municipality
- District of Tumbler Ridge
- Flag Logo
- Motto: "Invitatio Prosperitati"
- Location within British Columbia Location within Canada Location within North America
- Coordinates: 55.125°N 121.000°W
- Country: Canada
- Province: British Columbia
- Regional District: Peace River
- Incorporated: April 9, 1981 (district)

Government
  - Mayor: Darryl Krakowka
  - Governing body: Tumbler Ridge District Council
  - MP: Bob Zimmer
  - MLA: Larry Neufeld

Area
  - Total: 1,558.97 km^{2} (601.92 sq mi)
- Elevation: 830 m (2,720 ft)

Population (2021)
  - Total: 2,399
  - Density: 1.53979/km^{2} (3.9880/sq mi)
- Time zone: UTC−7 (MST)
- Postal code span: V0C 2W0
- Area code: 250/778/236
- Website: www.districtoftumblerridge.ca

Tumbler Ridge is a district municipality in the foothills of the B.C. Rockies in northeastern British Columbia, Canada, and a member municipality of the Peace River Regional District. With a population of 2,399 (2021) living in a townsite, the municipality encompasses an area of 1,558 km^{2} (602 sq mi) of mostly Crown land. The townsite is located near the confluence of the Murray River and Flatbed Creek and the intersection of Highway 52 and Highway 29 and includes the site of the Tumbler Ridge Secondary School and Tumbler Ridge Airport. The municipality is part of the Peace River South provincial electoral district and the Prince George—Peace River—Northern Rockies federal riding.

Tumbler Ridge is a planned community, with the housing and infrastructure built simultaneously in 1981 by the provincial government to service the coal industry as part of the British Columbia Resources Investment Corporation's Northeast Coal Development. In 1981, a consortium of Japanese steel mills agreed to purchase 100 million tonnes of coal over 15 years for US$7.5 billion from two mining companies, Denison Mines Inc. and the Teck Corporation, who were to operate the Quintette mine and the Bullmoose mine respectively. The uncertainty dissuaded investment and kept the economy from diversifying. When price reductions were forced onto the mines, the Quintette mine was closed in 2000 and the town lost about half its population. Coal prices began to rise after the turn of the century, leading to the opening of the Peace River Coal Trend mine by Northern Energy & Mining Inc. (now owned by Anglo American Met Coal) and the Wolverine Mine, originally owned by Western Canadian Coal, which was purchased by Walter Energy in 2010. Walter went bankrupt in 2015, and their Canadian assets—including the Wolverine Mine—were purchased by Conuma Coal in 2016.

After dinosaur footprints and fossils were discovered in the municipality, along with fossils of Triassic fishes and Cretaceous plants, the Peace Region Palaeontology Research Centre opened in 2003, followed by a dinosaur museum. The study of the area led to a recognition of its geological importance and listing in the UNESCO Global Geopark Network. Nearby recreational destinations include numerous trails, mountains, waterfalls, snowmobiling areas and provincial parks, such as Monkman Provincial Park, Bearhole Lake Provincial Park, and Gwillim Lake Provincial Park. In 2026, the town gained notoriety for being the site of a school shooting.

== History ==
=== Early history ===
Archaeological evidence shows a human presence dating back 3,000 years. The nomadic Sekani, followed by the Dane-zaa and then the Cree, periodically lived in temporary settlements around the future municipality. Formal exploratory and surveying expeditions were conducted by S. Prescott Fay, with Robert Cross and Fred Brewster in 1914, J.C. Gwillim in 1919, Edmund Spieker in 1920, and John Holzworth in 1923. Spieker coined the name Tumbler Ridge, referring to the mountains northwest of the future town, by altering Gwillim's map that named them Tumbler Range. Permanent settlers were squatters, five families by 1920, who maintained trap lines.

=== Coal extraction ===
In the 1950s and 1960s, oil and natural gas exploration and logging was conducted through the area, and 15 significant coal deposits were discovered. Coal prices rose after the 1973 oil crisis leading to 40 government studies examining the viability of accessing the coal, given the 1,130 km (700 mi) to the nearest port and the mountainous barrier.

With these coal deposits in mind, a purchasing agreement was signed in 1981 by two Canadian mining companies, a consortium of Japanese steel mills, and the governments of British Columbia and Canada. As part of the deal, the provincial government committed, under the North East Coal Development plan, to build a new town near the deposits, two highways off Highway 97, a power line from the W. A. C. Bennett Dam at Hudson's Hope, and a branch rail line through the Rocky Mountains. An alternative of using work camps staffed by people from Dawson Creek and Chetwynd was also considered. Massive initial investments were required as planning for the new town began in 1976 with the objective of having a fully functioning town ready before residents arrived.

The community's 1977 conceptual plan estimated a population of 3,568 residents in 1981, 7,940 in 1985, and 10,584 in 1987, after which the level was expected to stabilize. The planners of the community advised the mining companies to hire workers who were married, believing they would live in Tumbler Ridge longer and reduce employment turnover. Coordinated through the provincial Ministry of Municipal Affairs, the community, regional infrastructure, and mining plants were all built simultaneously. When the municipality was incorporated in April 1981 the area was completely forested. During that year building sites and roadways were cleared and in the winter the water and sewer system was built. In 1982, houses and other buildings were constructed. A high school and two elementary schools were built. Full production at the mines was reached the following year. The population rose to 3,833 people in 1984. The 1986 Canadian census, the first census to recognize Tumbler Ridge as a census subdivision, recorded 4,566 residents.

In 1984, world coal prices were dropping and the Japanese consortium requested a reduction in the price of coal from the Tumbler Ridge mines. As price reduction requests continued, the concern over the viability of the mines led the BC Assessment Authority to lower the 1987 property assessments for the Quintette mine from CAD$156 million to $89 million and the Bullmoose mine $70 million to $43 million. This lowered their taxes as they tried to enforce the purchasing agreement at the Supreme Court of Canada. Their 1990 ruling required the Quintette Operations Company to reduce coal prices and reimburse the Japanese consortium $4.6 million. The company responded by reducing production, cutting employment, and applying for court protection from creditors. This allowed Teck to acquire 50% interest and take over management of the Quintette mine, but it was unable to stop further job losses. Tumbler Ridge's population, which had peaked in 1991 at 4,794 people, began to decline.

=== Decline ===
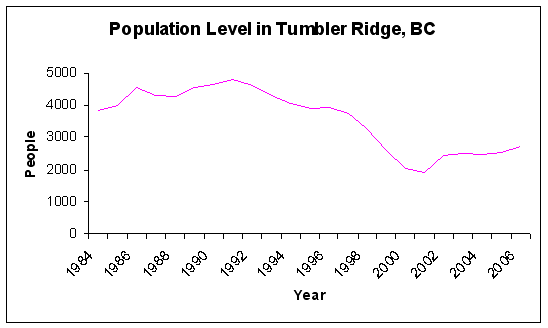
Tumbler Ridge's population trend, 1984–2006, BC Stats

As most residents left town, apartment blocks were closed and the mine companies bought back all but 11 houses in the town. After 30% of the workforce had been laid off, new contracts with the Japanese consortium were signed in 1997, allowing re-hirings to begin, but with lower export levels. The North East Coal Development was projected to create a net benefit of CAD$0.9 billion (2000), but incurred a net loss of $2.8 billion and half the expected regional employment.

The population declined as many residents were unable to find other work in the town, even as a sawmill for specialty woods opened in 1999. After Teck closed the Quintette mine in August 2000 and shifted production to the lower cost Bullmoose mine, the municipal council established the Tumbler Ridge Revitalization Task Force to investigate ways to boost and diversify the economy. The Task Force negotiated the return of the housing stock from the mines to the free market, grants from the province to become debt-free, and stabilized funds from the province for healthcare and education. The discovery of dinosaur tracks in 2000 by two local boys led to major fossil and bone discoveries from the Cretaceous Period. To survey and study the finds, government funding was secured to found both the Tumbler Ridge Museum Foundation and Peace Region Palaeontology Research Centre.

=== Renewed growth ===
The community went through a second boom-and-bust cycle beginning in 2004 with the increase in world coal prices. Western Canadian Coal opened new open-pit mining operations creating the Brule (Dillon) mine using some of the Bullmoose mining infrastructure, between the townsite and Chetwynd, and the Wolverine mine. These mines were purchased by Walter Energy in 2010, but world coal prices began to drop again in 2011 and in April 2014, Walter put their Canadian operations into care and maintenance, laying off nearly 700 people. Similarly, Anglo American placed their Trend mine in care and maintenance in 2015. These second generation coal mines were not as dominant in town affairs as Quinette and Bullmoose were such that, while as of 2016 there were no operating coal mines, the town had achieved some success in other activities, such as wind power, forestry and tourism. Most significantly, the area around Tumbler Ridge was listed as North America's second UNESCO Global Geoparks promoting its geological significance.

=== Contemporary history ===
On June 8, 2023, the community of Tumbler Ridge was evacuated due to the 2023 Canadian wildfires.

On February 10, 2026, seven people were killed in a mass shooting at the Tumbler Ridge Secondary School and two more at the shooter's home. The perpetrator, 18-year-old local resident Jesse Van Rootselaar, was found dead from a self-inflicted gunshot wound at the school.

== Demographics ==
Canada 2021 Census
	Tumbler Ridge	British Columbia
Median age	39.6 years	42.8 years
Under 15 years old	20%	14.3%
Over 65 years old	15.4%	20.3%
Household size	2.2	2.4

Historical populations
Year	Pop.	±%
1991	4,650	—
1996	3,775	−18.8%
2001	1,851	−51.0%
2006	2,454	+32.6%
2011	2,710	+10.4%
2016	1,987	−26.7%
2021	2,399	+20.7%

In the 2021 Census of Population conducted by Statistics Canada, Tumbler Ridge had a population of 2,399 living in 1,093 of its 1,551 total private dwellings, a change of 20.7% from its 2016 population of 1,987. With a land area of 1,557.41 km^{2} (601.32 sq mi), it had a population density of 1.5/km^{2} (4.0/sq mi) in 2021. As of the 2021 Census, the municipality is 78% European, 14% Indigenous, 3% Filipino, 2% Black and 2% Chinese.

The 2016 Canadian Census reported Tumbler Ridge's median age increased from 38.8 years in 2001 to 39.4 in 2016. In 2006, of those over 15 years of age, 62% were married, higher than the 54% provincial average. Reflecting the nature of the industrial jobs available in town, in 2001, only 12% of residents between 20 and 64 years of age completed university, half of the provincial average, and 26% did not complete high school, much higher than the 19% provincial average.

=== Religion ===
According to the 2021 census, religious groups in Tumbler Ridge included:

- Irreligion (1,430 persons or 59.7%)
- Christianity (935 persons or 39.0%)
- Other (25 persons or 1.0%)

== Geography and climate ==
The townsite is located on a series of southern-facing gravel terraces on a ridge of Mount Bergeron, overlooking the confluence of the Murray and Wolverine Rivers. The site, above the floodplain of the Murray River, has well-drained soils with easy access to aquifers with potable water. The rocks, mostly shale and mudstone but lacking quartzite, make the mountains less rugged than their neighbouring ranges. The terraces grow Lodgepole Pine, White Spruce, Trembling Aspen trees. Moose and elk are common. Escarpments to the east and north could pose a snow avalanche threat but are kept forested for stability. In 2006, the town was evacuated for several days as four forest fires approached the town.

Major coal deposits indicate the site was a swampy forest during the Cretaceous. Paleontologists have discovered tracks or bones from ankylosaurs, ornithopods (including a Hadrosaurus), and theropods. Fossils of Cretaceous plants such as ferns, redwoods, cycads, and ginkgo, and Triassic fishes and reptiles such as coelacanths, the thalattosaur (a type of marine reptile) Wapitisaurus, and ichthyosaurs have been recovered.

After examining other resource towns in Canada, the planners followed socio-spatial guidelines and principles in physical planning. The coal mining facilities were well separated from the townsite to minimize the feeling of a company town. An attempt to mitigate potential lifestyle conflicts between families and childless households was made by separating the low-density, single-family dwellings from the low-rise apartments. The apartment blocks were planned for areas with clusters of trees and excellent viewscapes, but close to the town plaza. The low-density residences that were more likely to have children living in them were oriented around elementary schools and parks. Cul-de-sacs were avoided in favour of better linkages and pedestrian access.

=== Climate ===
The town experiences a continental climate. Arctic air masses move predominantly southwest from the Mackenzie Valley towards the Rocky Mountains and through the mountains north of town. The town is in a rain shadow behind Mount Bergeron; much of the moisture that moves toward Tumbler Ridge precipitates in the mountains beforehand. Town planners laid out the roads so that they run along wind breaks, and buildings and parks are located in wind shadows. Bullmoose is a weather station near Tumbler Ridge, situated on the northern slopes of Bullmoose Mountain, at an elevation of 1102 m (3615 ft). Bullmoose has a subarctic climate (Köppen Dfc), with long, snowy winters and short, mild summers.

Climate data for Bullmoose, British Columbia (1981–2010): 1102 m
Month	Jan	Feb	Mar	Apr	May	Jun	Jul	Aug	Sep	Oct	Nov	Dec	Year
Record high °C (°F)	13.0 (55.4)	13.0 (55.4)	15.0 (59.0)	21.0 (69.8)	31.0 (87.8)	30.0 (86.0)	30.5 (86.9)	30.5 (86.9)	32.5 (90.5)	23.0 (73.4)	13.0 (55.4)	17.0 (62.6)	32.5 (90.5)
Mean daily maximum °C (°F)	−3.4 (25.9)	−2.0 (28.4)	0.3 (32.5)	6.7 (44.1)	12.4 (54.3)	16.3 (61.3)	18.9 (66.0)	18.3 (64.9)	12.9 (55.2)	6.3 (43.3)	−1.0 (30.2)	−3.1 (26.4)	6.9 (44.4)
Daily mean °C (°F)	−8.0 (17.6)	−6.6 (20.1)	−4.2 (24.4)	1.7 (35.1)	6.9 (44.4)	11.0 (51.8)	13.3 (55.9)	12.8 (55.0)	8.2 (46.8)	2.5 (36.5)	−4.7 (23.5)	−7.4 (18.7)	2.1 (35.8)
Mean daily minimum °C (°F)	−12.6 (9.3)	−11.2 (11.8)	−8.7 (16.3)	−3.4 (25.9)	1.5 (34.7)	5.6 (42.1)	7.8 (46.0)	7.2 (45.0)	3.4 (38.1)	−1.2 (29.8)	−8.5 (16.7)	−11.6 (11.1)	−2.6 (27.2)
Record low °C (°F)	−39.5 (−39.1)	−38.0 (−36.4)	−34.0 (−29.2)	−24.0 (−11.2)	−15.0 (5.0)	−2.0 (28.4)	−0.5 (31.1)	−3.0 (26.6)	−8.0 (17.6)	−27.5 (−17.5)	−42.5 (−44.5)	−36.5 (−33.7)	−42.5 (−44.5)
Average precipitation mm (inches)	69.1 (2.72)	49.8 (1.96)	49.6 (1.95)	37.1 (1.46)	45.0 (1.77)	94.2 (3.71)	91.2 (3.59)	72.3 (2.85)	65.8 (2.59)	82.8 (3.26)	81.5 (3.21)	54.4 (2.14)	792.7 (31.21)
Average snowfall cm (inches)	63.9 (25.2)	43.1 (17.0)	43.8 (17.2)	24.4 (9.6)	6.3 (2.5)	0.3 (0.1)	0.0 (0.0)	0.9 (0.4)	5.9 (2.3)	31.9 (12.6)	66.4 (26.1)	48.3 (19.0)	335.2 (132)
Average precipitation days (≥ 0.2 mm)	13.2	10.5	10.2	8.3	10.5	14.0	14.5	13.6	14.4	16.1	15.0	11.5	151.9
Average snowy days (≥ 0.2 cm)	12.5	9.7	9.1	5.4	1.7	0.1	0.0	0.2	1.8	7.3	12.5	10.5	70.8
Source: Environment Canada

== Infrastructure and services ==
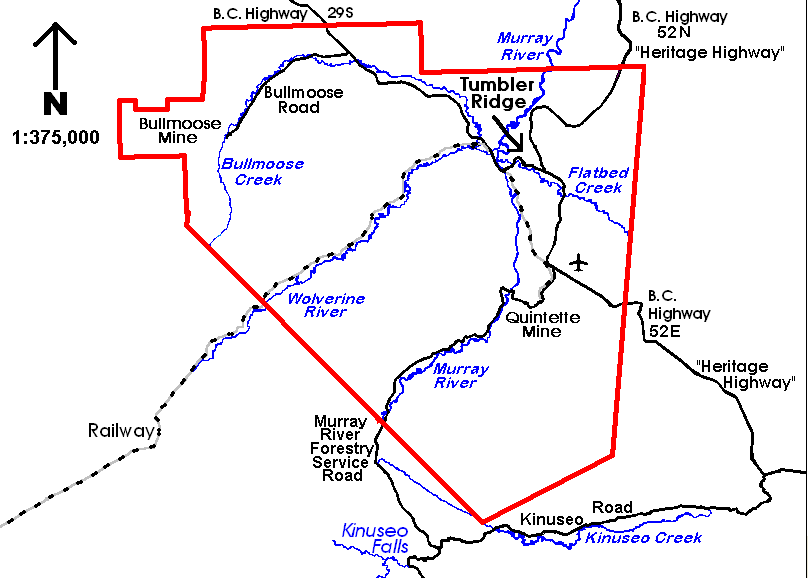
The municipal border (red) encompasses over 1500 km^{2} (600 sq mi) of land. The townsite is on the northern end of the municipality where the rivers converge.

Two highways diverge from Highway 97 and intersect in Tumbler Ridge: Highway 52 (Heritage Highway) which runs 98 km (61 mi) south at Arras, and Highway 29 which runs 90 km (56 mi) southeast from Chetwynd. At the intersection Highway 29 ends but Highway 52 continues south past Tumbler Ridge, then unpaved, it runs northeast to Highway 2 near the Alberta border. In town, the 28 km (17 mi) of paved roads are laid out in a curvilinear pattern that use two arterial roads, MacKenzie Way and Monkman Way, to connect each section of town.

The unmanned Tumbler Ridge Airport, with its 1,219 m (3,999 ft) asphalt runway, is used by chartered and local flights. The closest airports with regularly scheduled flights are in Dawson Creek, Fort St John and Grande Prairie. The rail line into town is a 140 km (87 mi) formerly electrified branch line through the Rocky Mountains constructed by BC Rail to transport coal to the Port of Prince Rupert. The branch line includes two major tunnels: the 9.7 km (6.0 mi) Table Tunnel and the 5.5 km (3.4 mi) Wolverine Tunnel.

Fire rescue services are provided by the town's own 16-member composite fire department. Police services are provided by the Royal Canadian Mounted Police which maintains a five officer detachment within the municipality. BCEHS maintained an on-call ambulance service up until April 2024 when they implemented their first full-time car. Since then BCEHS has implemented a second full time car in September 2025 to make up for the clinic's reduced hours. Tumbler Ridge Search and Rescue provide backcountry emergency response to the surrounding areas around Tumbler Ridge. The town operates a water treatment system and sewage disposal system. Drinking water is drawn from two drilled wells south of the townsite where it is stored in a 7 million litre reservoir before being chlorinated and pumped into town. The storm sewers empty into the Murray River, but the sanitary sewage is processed through a lagoon system and released into the Murray River north of town.

== Economy ==
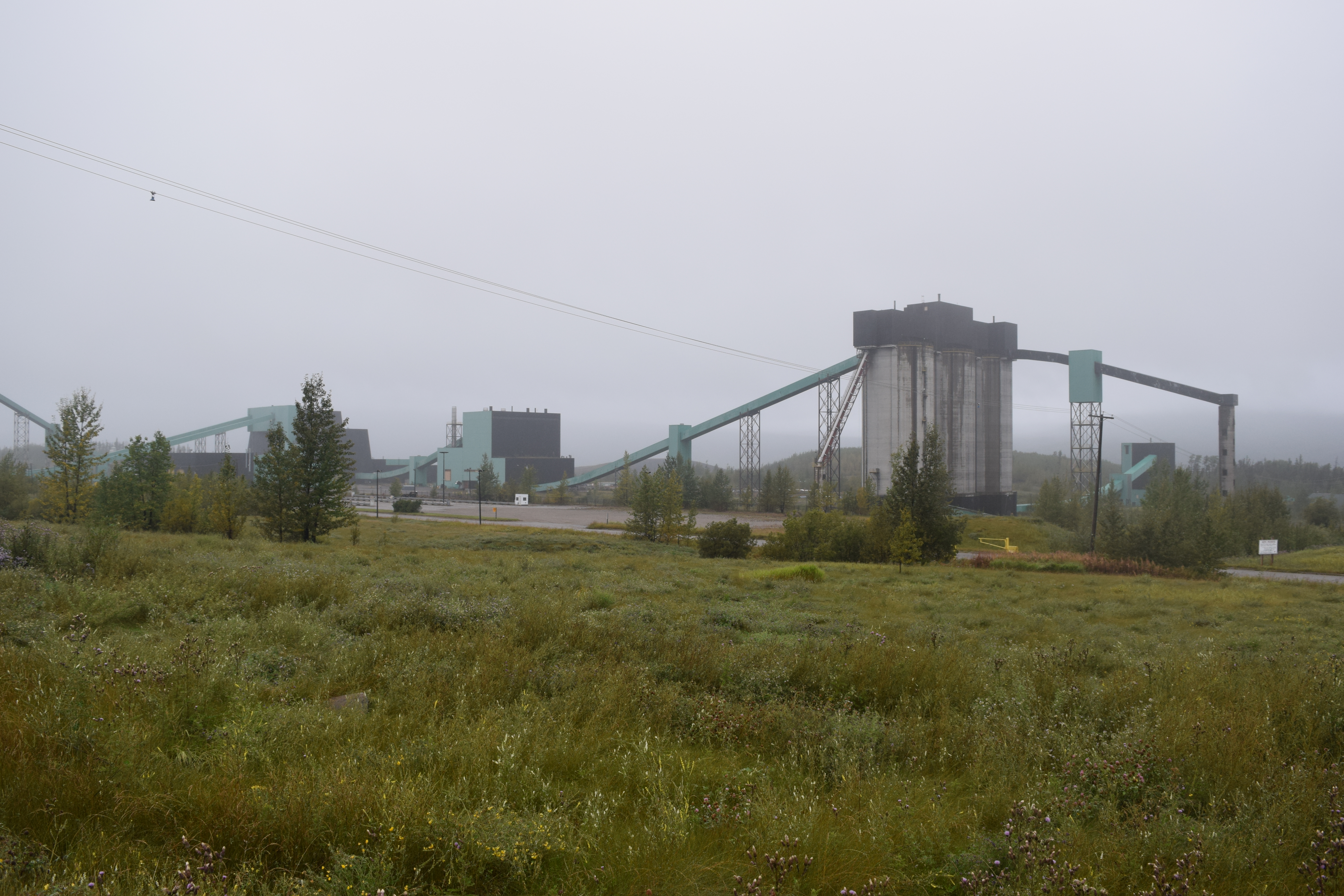
Quintette Coal Mine, Tumbler Ridge

Tumbler Ridge was built to provide a labour force for the coal mining industry, which has remained the dominant employer throughout the town's history. The mining companies had a contract to sell 100 million tons of coal to a consortium of Japanese steel mills over 15 years for US$7.5 billion (1981). The Quintette Operating Corporation (QOC) was formed by partnership between Denison Mines (50%), Mitsui Mining (20%), Tokyo Boeki (20%), and other smaller firms, and began blasting at the Quintette mine in October 1982. The Bullmoose Operating Corporation was formed by the Teck Corporation (51%), Lornex (39%), and Nissho Iwai (10%) and worked the smaller Bullmoose mine. The economic viability of the mining companies were in question since the world coal prices began falling in the early 1980s and the Japanese consortium requested reduced prices. After the Supreme Court ruled that the coal prices must be reduced, the QOC filed for court protection from its creditors allowing the Teck Corporation to take over management in 1992. By 1996, even as lay-offs continued, over half the town's labour force were employed at one of the two mines.

New contracts with the Japanese consortium, signed 1997, moved production to the lower cost Bullmoose mine but guaranteed production until 2003 when that mine was expected to be exhausted. The Quintette mine was closed altogether on August 31, 2000. Since then, three other coal mines opened but were unprofitable: Walter Energy's Willow Creek, Brule and Wolverine mines. While there was an intent by the town's planners to move to a more diversified economy, the few initiatives in this direction were not supported by the industries or local decision-makers. HD Mining International pursued opening another coal mine, the Murray River project, but encountered labour challenges. Teck Resources sold the Quintette mine to Conuma Resources in February 2023 for $120 million, and the mine partially reopened in September 2024. As of 2025 Conuma Resources operates 5 mines within the area: Quintette (operating), Trend (care and maintenance), Wolverine (closure), Brule (care and maintenance), and Willow Creek (operating). Conuma produces 5 million tons of coal annually.

== Culture, recreation and media ==
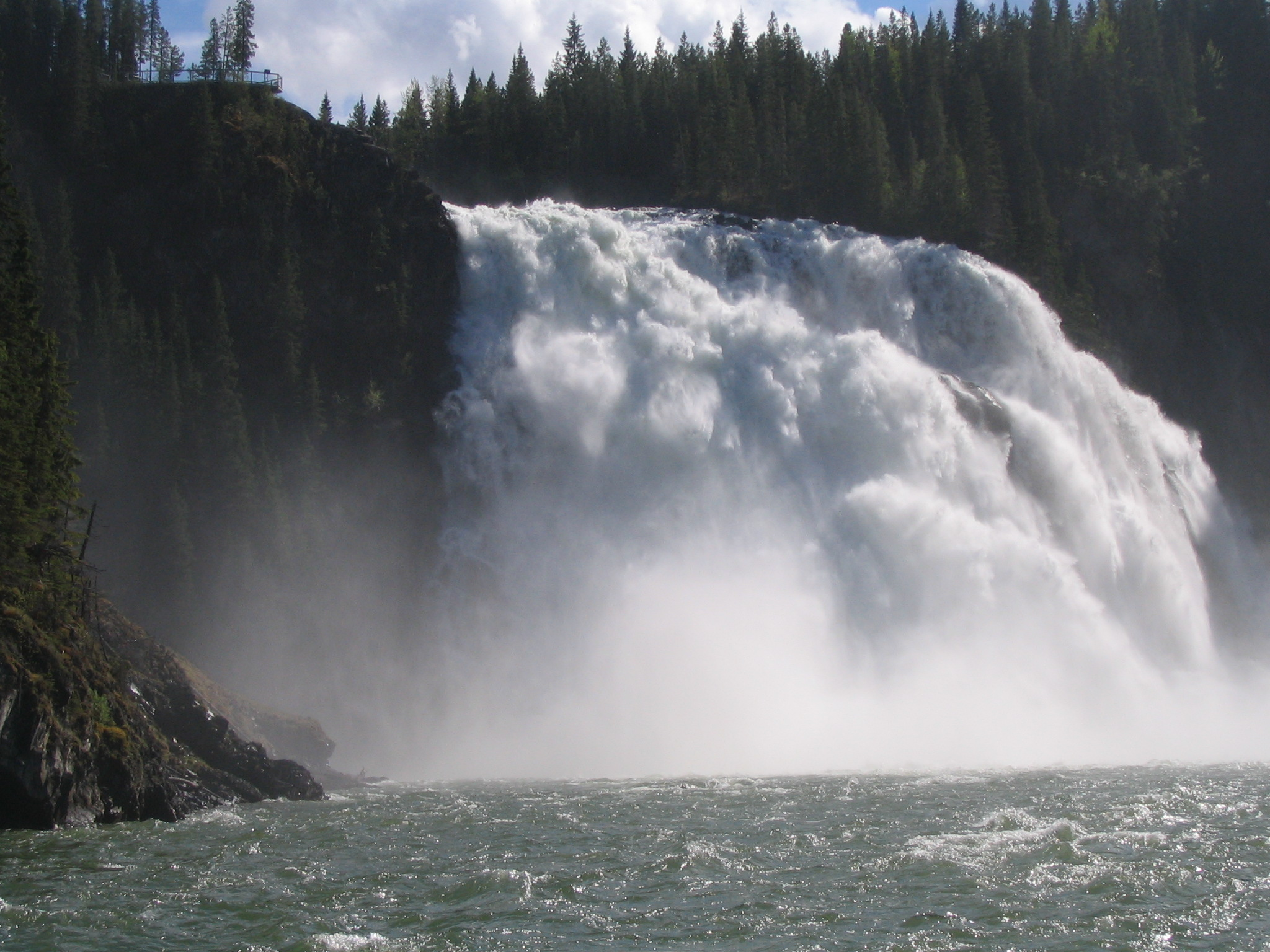
Kinuseo Falls in the Monkman Provincial Park

After dinosaur trackways were discovered in 2000, and bones in 2002, the Tumbler Ridge Museum Foundation began excavations and opened the Peace Region Palaeontology Research Centre. Fossils and bones are displayed at both locations. Tours and educational programs related to dinosaur, the trackways, and the wilderness are offered. In the fall of 2014, Tumbler Ridge was designated a full member of UNESCO's Global Geopark Network. Comprising 7,822 km^{2}, the geopark highlights the geological heritage of the area such as Cretaceous dinosaur tracks and bone bed and fossils of Triassic fishes and marine reptiles. Tumbler Ridge's location among the Rocky Mountains has allowed for the development of numerous trail systems for motorized and non-motorized recreation. The trails and open areas span numerous mountains. Kinuseo Falls along the Murray River in the Monkman Provincial Park is the most popular destination for visitors to Tumbler Ridge. Two other provincial parks are just outside the municipal boundaries: Bearhole Lake Provincial Park and Gwillim Lake Provincial Park.

Tumbler Ridge has one newspaper published in the community, the locally owned and operated Tumbler Ridgelines. It started after the publisher of the Tumbler Ridge News (formerly Community Connections) died in 2017. Annual events held in Tumbler Ridge include the Grizfest Music Festival and the Emperor's Challenge. The Emperor's Challenge is a 21 km (13 mi) half marathon up Roman Mountain that has been held in August since 1998. The Grizfest Music Festival (formerly Grizzly Valley Days) is a two-day event held on the August or September long weekend that includes a concert, parade, displays and other community-wide events.

== Government and politics ==
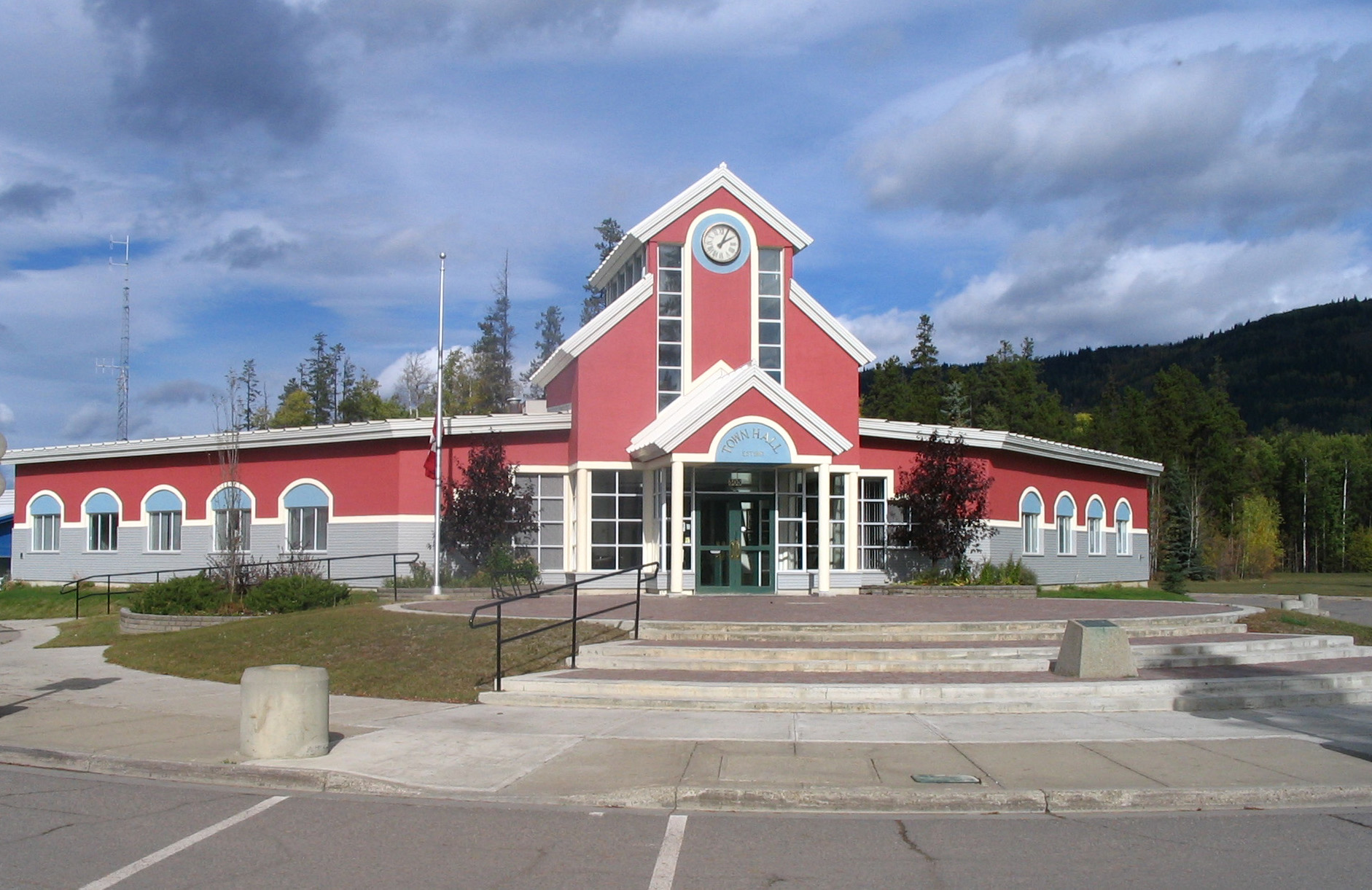
Tumbler Ridge district hall

The District of Tumbler Ridge's council-manager form of municipal government is headed by a mayor (who also represents Tumbler Ridge on the Peace River Regional District's governing board) and a six-member council; these positions are subject to at-large elections every four years. Keith Bertrand was elected mayor on October 21, 2018, succeeding one-term mayors Don McPherson (2014–2018), Darwin Wren (2011–2014) and Larry White (2008–2011), who had all succeeded long-time mayor Mike Caisley. Residents of the District also elect one school trustee to School District 59.

Tumbler Ridge federal election results
Year	Liberal		Conservative		New Democratic		Green	
2021	5%	58	66%	732	12%	136	2%	26
2019	7%	86	73%	844	7%	84	4%	43

Tumbler Ridge provincial election results
Year	New Democratic		Conservative		Green		Liberal	
2024	7%	58	69%	612	0%	0	0%	0
2020	14%	95	28%	195	0%	0	56%	390
2017	24%	149	0%	0	0%	0	76%	461

For representation in the Legislative Assembly of British Columbia, Tumbler Ridge is part of the Peace River South electoral district which was represented by Mike Bernier of the BC Liberal Party from 2013 until 2024. Prior to Bernier, the riding was represented by Blair Lekstrom who was elected in the 2001 provincial election, with 72% support from the town's polls and re-elected in 2005 with 64% and in 2009 with 70% support. Before Lekstrom, Peace River South was represented by Jack Weisgerber as a member of the Social Credit Party of British Columbia (1986–1994) and Reform Party of British Columbia (1994–2001). In 1996, as leader of the Reform Party, Weisgerber won re-election despite the Tumbler Ridge polls placing him second to the New Democratic Party candidate.

Federally, Tumbler Ridge is in the Prince George—Peace River—Northern Rockies riding, represented in the House of Commons of Canada by Conservative Party Member of Parliament Bob Zimmer. Before Zimmer, who was elected in May 2011, the riding was represented by Jay Hill since 1993. The riding was represented by Frank Oberle of the Progressive Conservative Party from 1972 to 1993. Oberle served as Canada's Minister of Science and Technology in 1985 and as Minister of Forestry in 1989.
