= British Columbia Highway 29 =

Highway in British Columbia

Highway 29
- Don Phillips Way

Route information
- Maintained by the Ministry of Transportation and Infrastructure
- Length: 236 km (147 mi)
- Existed: 1967–present

Major junctions
- South end: Highway 52 in Tumbler Ridge
- Highway 97 near Chetwynd
- North end: Highway 97 north of Fort St. John

Location
- Country: Canada
- Province: British Columbia

Highway system
- British Columbia provincial highways
← Highway 28	→ Highway 30

Highway 29, known locally as Don Philips Way, is a shortcut route from the John Hart Highway to the Alaska Highway in the Peace River Regional District. It is also the main access to the coal mining community of Tumbler Ridge, as well as the W. A. C. Bennett Dam facility near Hudson's Hope. The highway gained its '29' designation from Chetwynd north to Hudson's Hope in 1967, and then seventeen years later, the road from Chetwynd south to Tumbler Ridge was given the same number.

== Route details ==
In Tumbler Ridge, the 237 km (147 mi) long Highway 29 starts at a junction with Highway 52, and travels north northwest for 94 km (58 mi) to its junction with the John Hart Highway at Chetwynd. It follows the John Hart Highway through Chetwynd for 3 km (1.9 mi) east, then turns northwest for 65 km (40 mi) past Moberly Lake to Hudson's Hope, where a connector road to the W. A. C. Bennett Dam begins. 75 km (47 mi) northeast of Hudson's Hope, Highway 29 finally meets the Alaska Highway north of Fort St. John near Charlie Lake.

== Major intersections ==
From south to north. The entire route is in Peace River Regional District.

Location	km	mi	Destinations	Notes
Tumbler Ridge	0.00	0.00	Highway 52 – Dawson Creek, Fort St. John	Highway 29 southern terminus
	93.62	58.17	Highway 97 north (John Hart Highway) – Dawson Creek	South end of Highway 97 concurrency
Chetwynd	96.54	59.99	Highway 97 south (John Hart Highway) – Prince George	North end of Highway 97 concurrency
	154.35	95.91	Hudson's Hope Suspension Bridge crosses the Peace River	
Hudson's Hope	161.74	100.50	Canyon Drive (Highway 908:1179 west) – W.A.C. Bennett Dam	
Charlie Lake	236.01	146.65	Highway 97 (Alaska Highway) – Fort Nelson, Fort St. John	Highway 29 northern terminus
1.000 mi = 1.609 km; 1.000 km = 0.621 mi: Concurrency terminus
