= Arras, British Columbia =

Coordinates: 55.74673°N 120.53505°W

Arras
- Unincorporated place (UNP)
- Arras-Devereaux
- Interactive map of Arras
- Country: Canada

Area
  - Land: 14.06 km^{2} (5.43 sq mi)

Population
  - Total: 133
  - Density: 9.5/km^{2} (25/sq mi)
- Time zone: UTC-7 (Mountain Standard Time)

Arras is a community located in British Columbia, Canada.

== Description ==
Arras is an unincorporated place (UNP) in British Columbia that is located along the Kiskatinaw River, in the Peace River Regional District. It is located along Highway 97 connected to the city of Dawson Creek in British Columbia. Google maps indicates the postal code of Arras is V0C 1B0.

According to the 2021 Canadian Census, the population of Arras-Devereaux is 133. The settlement had a 41.2% decrease in population since 2016. There are currently a total of 59 private dwellings located there.
