= Chetwynd, British Columbia =

Chetwynd Little Prairie
- District municipality
- District of Chetwynd
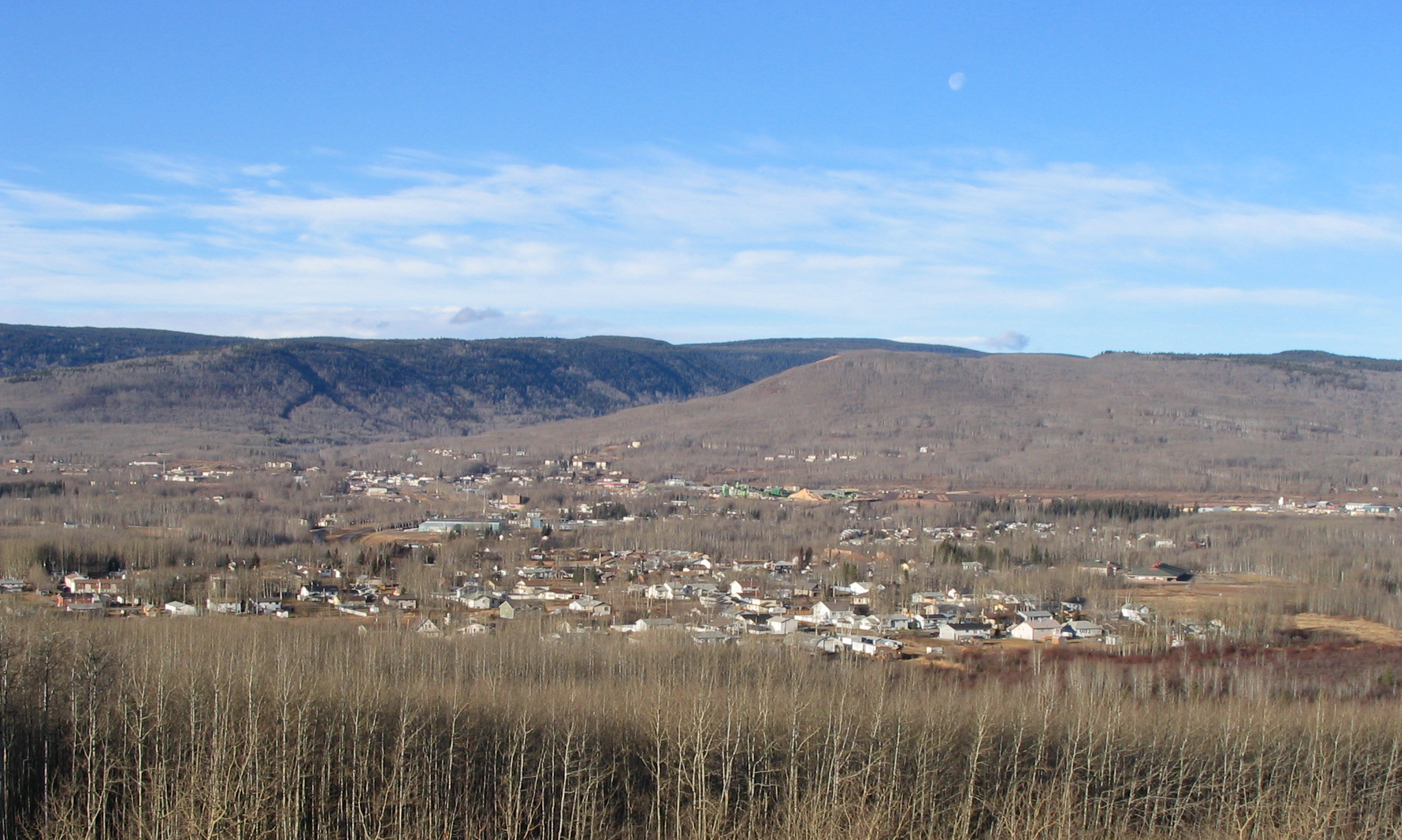
- The townsite of Chetwynd in the foothills of the Rocky Mountains

- Flag Coat of arms

- Location within British Columbia Chetwynd (Canada) Chetwynd (North America)
- Coordinates: 55°41′45″N 121°38′18″W
- Country: Canada
- Province: British Columbia
- Regional district: Peace River
- Settled: 1918 (trading post)
- Incorporated: 25 September 1962 (village)
- 31 May 1983 (district)

Government
  - Mayor: Allen Courtoreille
  - Governing body: Chetwynd District Council
  - MLA: Mike Bernier

Area
  - Land: 63.55 km^{2} (24.54 sq mi)
  - Designated place (retired population centre): 10.55 km^{2} (4.07 sq mi)
- Elevation: 615 m (2,018 ft)

Population (2021)
  - Total: 2,302
  - Density: 36.2/km^{2} (94/sq mi)
  - Designated place: 1,917
  - Designated place density: 181.7/km^{2} (471/sq mi)
- Time zone: UTC−07:00 (MST)
- Postal code: V0C 1J0
- Area codes: 250 / 778 / 236
- Website: gochetwynd.com

Chetwynd /ˈtʃɛtwɪnd/ is a district municipality located in the eastern foothills of the Rocky Mountains, in northeastern British Columbia, Canada. Situated on an ancient floodplain, it is the first town eastbound travellers encounter after emerging from the Rockies along Highway 97, and acts as the gateway to the Peace River Country. The town developed during the construction of infrastructure through the Rocky Mountains in the 1950s; additionally, it was used as a transshipment point during the building of hydroelectric dams, in the 1960s and 1970s, and the new town of Tumbler Ridge, in the early 1980s. Home to approximately 2,600 residents, the town’s population has increased little—if at all—since the 1980s, but is significantly younger than the provincial average.

Once known as Little Prairie, the community adopted its name in honour of provincial politician Ralph Chetwynd, just prior to its incorporation, in 1962. The 64-square-kilometre (25 sq mi) municipality consists of the town, a community forest, and four exclave properties. Chetwynd has dozens of chainsaw carvings displayed throughout the town as public art. It is home to a Northern Lights College campus. Nearby, there are four provincial parks, two lakes, and several recreational trails.

Highways 29 and 97 intersect in town; the east–west Highway 97 connects the town to Prince George and Dawson Creek while the north–south Highway 29 connects Tumbler Ridge and Hudson's Hope. A rail line branches-off in three directions: northward to Fort St. John, east to Dawson Creek, and west through the Rockies to Prince George. The Chetwynd economy is dominated by the primary industries of forestry, fossil fuel extraction, and transportation. Chetwynd is a member municipality in the Peace River Regional District and, as of 2021, is represented in provincial politics by BC United MLA Mike Bernier (elected in 2013).

== History ==
From 1918 until the 1930s, the present townsite hosted a trading post on a grassy pasture known to the Sekani and Saulteaux as Little Prairie. In the 1920s, settlers from the Peace River Country began migrating westwards across the frozen Kiskatinaw and Pine Rivers to lands assigned under the Dominion Lands Act for homesteading. Little Prairie was homesteaded in 1930 by Alexander and Lillan Windrem who cleared the land by 1935 for hay, oats and gardens. Oil and coal discoveries, west of Little Prairie, near Commotion Creek, led to the construction of area roads. As the area's natural resource potential became more apparent, a highway was planned in the late 1940s from the British Columbia Interior to the northern side of the Rocky and Omineca Mountains. The John Hart Highway, named after John Hart, a former British Columbia premier, was completed in 1952; designated Highway 97S it stretches from Prince George to Dawson Creek, with an intersection at Little Prairie. This was northeastern British Columbia's first connection with the rest of the province; previously a trip through the neighbouring province of Alberta was required. Following the opening of the highway, businesses such as restaurants and service stations were opened in Little Prairie to accommodate incoming workers and settlers. The first school was built in 1951.

Little Prairie was incorporated as a waterworks district on 8 October 1957; within the span of a few years a rail line, natural gas pipeline, and telephone line were built along the highway from Prince George. Provincial Minister of Railways Ralph Chetwynd (who also directed the Pacific Great Eastern Railway) headed the rail line project. The rail line continued eastward to Dawson Creek which was the westernmost terminus of Northern Alberta Railways. In early 1958, the first train ceremonially arrived in Little Prairie from Vancouver. Its load included pipe to symbolize natural gas development, steel railway track for the extension of the rail line, box cars for grain and lumber, and a truck representing freight hauling along the Alaska Highway. The railway station in Little Prairie was completed in 1959 and named after Chetwynd, who had died two years earlier. Soon afterwards the post office adopted this name.

Chetwynd became the community's official name on 1 July 1959. In 1960, the Chetwynd Waterworks District expanded its mandate to include garbage disposal, fire protection, and street lighting. Led by its Chamber of Commerce, the community incorporated as a municipality on 25 September 1962. The application for incorporation estimated Chetwynd's population as 750—inclusive of nearby work camps. The 1966 Canadian census, the first to recognize Chetwynd as a census subdivision, counted 1,368 residents.

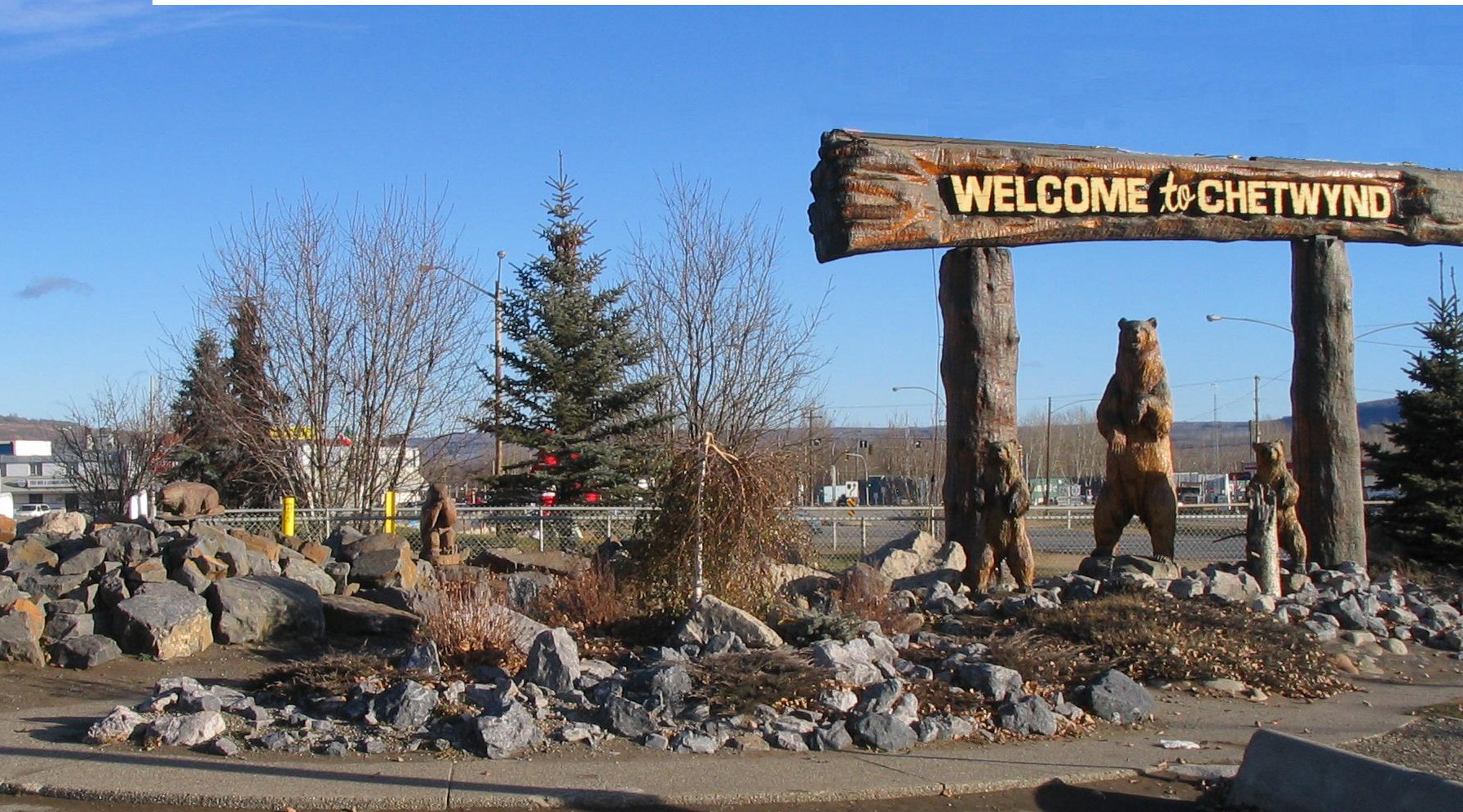
Sign and chainsaw carvings along Highway 97 welcoming travellers going east

Growth continued in the 1960s when the town served as the rail-to-truck transshipment point for delivering workers and supplies to the construction site of the W. A. C. Bennett Dam in nearby Hudson's Hope. Canfor and West Fraser Timber bought sawmills in 1964 and 1971, respectively, and eventually became two of the town's largest employers. The development of its forestry sector led to the town being declared the Canadian Forest Service's 1992 Forestry Capital of Canada. The community opened a rodeo ground and curling rink in 1963, a library in 1967, a new fire hall in 1968, an airport in 1970 and a hospital in 1971.

Further growth was stoked in the late 1970s and early 1980s by the construction of the Peace Canyon Dam near the Bennett Dam, the opening of the natural gas and sulphur plant, and the construction of a mining town Tumbler Ridge. Chetwynd thus was re-incorporated as a district in 1983 with a population of 2,957. With no more megaprojects, Chetwynd's population remained relatively stable at about 3,000, with a peak population in 1996 at 3,113.

In 1983, Andrea Scherpf and Bernd Göricke were murdered near Chetwynd. They had been hitchhiking in western Canada in the fourth quarter of 1983. In early October, they accepted a ride in a 1960s Chevrolet pick-up. The unidentified driver shot and killed the couple, then dumped the bodies 32 kilometres (20 mi) west of the community. A Canadian was convicted of the murders in 1991 but was later exonerated by DNA evidence and released. The case remains unsolved.

On 4 December 1996, Chetwynd's boundaries were expanded to include 49 square kilometres (19 sq mi) of forested land and industrial properties. Most of this came from moving the northern border up 210 metres (690 ft) over Ol' Baldy Ridge to create a community forest, a concept which originated from a Chetwynd Secondary School proposal in 1980 for a fitness trail. The trail became the backbone of a system of interconnected trails and greenspaces that went up the ridge. Four industrial properties—a gas plant, sulfur processing plant, coal mine, and pulp mill—became exclaves of the district as they incorporated to receive municipal services. The coal mine, with an expected lifespan of 15 years, was approved by the province for development in 1998. It was not constructed until 2004, making it the province's first new coal mine in 20 years. It only operated for two years before closing due to poor yields, equipment failure, and lack of financial backing.

== Geography and climate ==
Carved out of an ancient floodplain, the small terrace upon which Chetwynd is situated lies in the northern foothills of the Rocky Mountains. Once used as a grazing spot by nomadic Aboriginals, the terrace was farmed by settlers until it was developed into a town. Two types of soil—namely, the Widmark and Centurion Series—comprise the terrace's surface. The Widmark Series—a moderately well-drained degraded loamy, woody, silty, and clay-like soil—lies north of Highway 97. Meanwhile, the Centurion Series—which lies south of the highway—is a poorly drained soil with a dark-brown peaty surface material consisting of decomposed leaves and mosses. These soils, also limited by topography and stoniness, are generally used for forage and pasture.

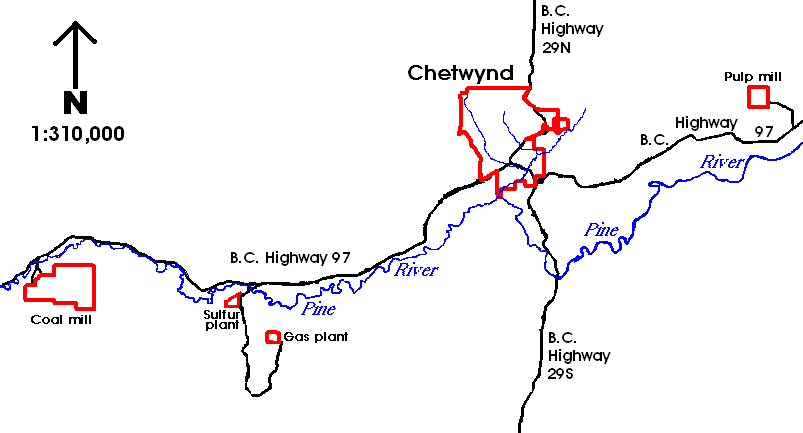
The District of Chetwynd with main townsite and four exclave properties

The town is surrounded by forested hills but the prairies of the Peace River Country begin here and continue eastward into Alberta. It lies in a transition area dividing two biogeoclimatic regions: the Boreal White and Black Spruce zone and the Engelmann Spruce-Subalpine Fir zone. The regions surrounding Chetwynd and Dawson Creek contain caribou herds, although the total number of caribou have decreased in the first two decades of the 21st century. One factor of the caribou's decline is the large number of wolves who prey on the caribou; in 2014 the British Columbian government began a wolf-culling program to reduce the number of wolves in the region. The region also contains moose, whose numbers have increased due to improved habitats caused by cutting down trees for the logging industry. The area surrounding Chetwynd was affected by a pine beetle infestation, which caused timber mills to reduce their operations in the region.

The town experiences a cool continental climate, including cold winters and warm summers. Southwesterly winds, coming off Williston Lake, predominate, with wind speeds averaging around 8.2 kilometres per hour (5.1 mph). About 318 millimetres (12.5 in) of rain and 169 centimetres (67 in) of snow fall on the town annually and about 30 days with some fog are expected per year. Chetwynd, like the rest of the Peace River Regional District, uses Mountain Standard Time year-round. The remainder of the province uses Pacific Time with daylight saving time, meaning that Chetwynd shares the same time with the province during the summer and is one hour ahead during the winter.

Climate data for Chetwynd (Chetwynd Airport) Climate ID: 1181508; coordinates 55°41′14″N 121°37′36″W; elevation: 609.6 m (2,000 ft); 1991–2020 normals
Month	Jan	Feb	Mar	Apr	May	Jun	Jul	Aug	Sep	Oct	Nov	Dec	Year
Record high humidex	15.0	13.5	22.2	25.5	34.3	32.3	36.3	35.4	33.3	26.6	14.6	12.4	36.3
Record high °C (°F)	15.7 (60.3)	14.8 (58.6)	22.4 (72.3)	26.1 (79.0)	33.4 (92.1)	31.0 (87.8)	32.7 (90.9)	33.8 (92.8)	30.8 (87.4)	27.0 (80.6)	14.8 (58.6)	13.2 (55.8)	33.8 (92.8)
Mean daily maximum °C (°F)	−5.0 (23.0)	−1.4 (29.5)	2.9 (37.2)	11.2 (52.2)	16.6 (61.9)	20.1 (68.2)	22.2 (72.0)	21.6 (70.9)	16.3 (61.3)	9.4 (48.9)	−1.1 (30.0)	−4.1 (24.6)	9.1 (48.4)
Daily mean °C (°F)	−10.2 (13.6)	−7.2 (19.0)	−2.9 (26.8)	4.6 (40.3)	9.5 (49.1)	13.4 (56.1)	15.4 (59.7)	14.5 (58.1)	9.9 (49.8)	4.1 (39.4)	−5.5 (22.1)	−9.1 (15.6)	3.0 (37.4)
Mean daily minimum °C (°F)	−15.3 (4.5)	−12.9 (8.8)	−8.7 (16.3)	−2.1 (28.2)	2.4 (36.3)	6.6 (43.9)	8.5 (47.3)	7.4 (45.3)	3.5 (38.3)	−1.3 (29.7)	−10.0 (14.0)	−14.1 (6.6)	−3.0 (26.6)
Record low °C (°F)	−52.0 (−61.6)	−42.1 (−43.8)	−38.6 (−37.5)	−27.6 (−17.7)	−9.8 (14.4)	−2.7 (27.1)	−1.8 (28.8)	−6.6 (20.1)	−8.5 (16.7)	−28.2 (−18.8)	−42.0 (−43.6)	−46.3 (−51.3)	−52.0 (−61.6)
Record low wind chill	−58.0	−48.8	−43.1	−31.4	−14.9	0.0	0.0	−6.8	−10.0	−34.4	−50.0	−53.8	−58.0
Average precipitation mm (inches)	21.1 (0.83)	16.2 (0.64)	21.9 (0.86)	20.4 (0.80)	37.2 (1.46)	75.7 (2.98)	76.9 (3.03)	51.4 (2.02)	41.2 (1.62)	29.1 (1.15)	30.6 (1.20)	19.1 (0.75)	440.6 (17.35)
Average rainfall mm (inches)	0.9 (0.04)	0.5 (0.02)	1.3 (0.05)	10.3 (0.41)	32.5 (1.28)	75.7 (2.98)	76.9 (3.03)	51.4 (2.02)	38.0 (1.50)	14.0 (0.55)	3.8 (0.15)	1.2 (0.05)	306.4 (12.06)
Average snowfall cm (inches)	27.3 (10.7)	22.7 (8.9)	28.5 (11.2)	11.6 (4.6)	5.2 (2.0)	0.0 (0.0)	0.0 (0.0)	0.0 (0.0)	3.4 (1.3)	19.2 (7.6)	35.4 (13.9)	24.1 (9.5)	177.4 (69.8)
Average precipitation days (≥ 0.2 mm)	9.6	8.3	9.9	8.3	11.2	13.2	13.9	12.5	12.4	10.5	11.6	9.0	130.3
Average rainy days (≥ 0.2 mm)	0.9	0.6	1.2	5.4	10.4	13.2	13.9	12.5	12.0	6.7	2.3	0.9	79.9
Average snowy days (≥ 0.2 cm)	9.2	8.2	9.2	4.2	1.5	0.0	0.0	0.0	1.1	5.1	10.3	8.3	57.1
Average relative humidity (%) (at 1500 LST)	69.6	63.7	55.0	41.1	40.0	45.2	48.1	49.0	50.4	54.8	69.8	71.6	54.9
Mean monthly sunshine hours	73.5	109.2	160.0	212.0	246.2	247.6	282.0	257.5	171.8	120.8	69.4	53.1	2,002.8
Percentage possible sunshine	30.7	40.3	43.7	50.0	48.9	47.4	53.8	55.2	44.8	37.2	27.7	23.9	42.0
Source: Environment and Climate Change Canada

== Demographics ==
2021 Canadian census
	Chetwynd	British Columbia
Median age	36.0 years	42.8 years
Under 15 years old	17.2%	14.3%
Between 15 and 64 years old	71.5%	65.3%
Over 65 years old	11.5%	20.3%
Median household income (after tax)	$89,000	$76,000
Household size	2.7	2.8

Historical populations
Year	Pop.	±%
1966	1,368	—
1971	1,260	−7.9%
1976	1,733	+37.5%
1981	2,553	+47.3%
1986	2,774	+8.7%
1991	2,843	+2.5%
1996	2,980	+4.8%
2001	2,591	−13.1%
2006	2,633	+1.6%
2011	2,635	+0.1%
2016	2,503	−5.0%
2021	2,302	−8.0%
Note: 1976 population figure is adjusted due to boundary changes.

In the 2021 Canadian census conducted by Statistics Canada, Chetwynd had a population of 2,302 living in 993 of its 1,271 total private dwellings, a change of −8% from its 2016 population of 2,503. With a land area of 63.55 square kilometres (24.54 sq mi), it had a population density of 36.2/km^{2} (93.8/sq mi) in 2021.

According to the 2021 census, Chetwynd had a median age almost seven years lower than the province's median. English is the mother tongue of nearly all (87.1%) residents of Chetwynd, which includes a small population (1.3%) of French speakers. There are about 3.7% native Tagalog speakers, and 0.4% Cree language speakers. Only 10.3% of Chetwynd residents are immigrants, considerably lower than the provincial average of 29%. The largest immigrant group comes from the Philippines, representing 40.4% of all immigrants to the municipality.

Residents of Chetwynd with no certificate, diploma, or degree make up 20.7% of the population compared to the provincial average of 13.5%. However, those with a secondary school diploma comprise 36.3% of the population compared to the provincial average of 29.5%, and those with a post-secondary certificate or diploma (below a bachelor's degree) comprise 32.9% of the population compared to the provincial average of 28.5%. There are significantly fewer residents with a bachelor's, or higher, degree in Chetwynd (10.3%) compared to the provincial average of 28.6%. Almost all commuters in Chetwynd commute by car, truck, or van (84.4%), which is higher than the provincial average of 79.9%.

=== Ethnicity ===
As of 2021, there are few visible minorities in Chetwynd (11.6%) compared to the provincial average of 34.4% with Filipinos representing the largest visible minority as well with 125 residents (5.5% of the total population). Approximately 380, or 16.7%, of residents of Chetwynd considered themselves to have an Indigenous identity, much higher than the provincial average of 3.9%. The primary ethnic groups in Chetwynd were reported as: English (23.1%), Scottish (20.4%), German (17.8%), Irish (16.5%), French (12.5%), Métis (9.7%), Norwegian (9%), Canadians (8.4%), and First Nations (5.9%).

=== Religion ===
According to the 2021 census, there were only two religious groups in Chetwynd along with those professing no religion:

- Irreligion (1,445 persons or 63.5% compared to 52.1% for the province)
- Christianity (795 persons or 34.9% compared to 34.3% for the province)
- Buddhism (15 persons or 0.7% compared to 1.7% for the province)

== Economy ==
Chetwynd is the commercial centre for the rural communities of the Pine River Valley, as well as Moberly Lake, Jackfish Lake, and Lone Prairie. These rural residents are mostly cattle, sheep, and bison ranchers and use the town as a transportation hub to ship products via highways or rail. After the town was connected by rail and highway to the remainder of the province, the town's economy expanded, between 1950 and 1980, to include primary industries, including lumber mills (Chetwynd Forest Industries, Canfor (Canadian Forest Industries), Tembec Pulp Mill), gas plants (Duke Energy, Talisman Energy), a coal processing plant (Pine Valley Mining), and a sulfur processing plant (Enersul). Since the late 1990s, Chetwynd has undergone an economic downturn from the closure of coal mines in Tumbler Ridge and the softwood lumber trade dispute between Canada and the United States, which led to the closure of the Louisiana-Pacific Canada Pulp Company pulp operations in 2001.

The 2001 census recorded 1,120 income-earners over the age of 15 residing in Chetwynd; of these, 690 (62%) worked full-time throughout the year.

Since then, the economy has rebounded with increased oil, gas and mineral exploration, tourist marketing of the area's outdoor recreational activities and chainsaw carvings program, new and re-opened coal mines, and wind farm construction. Both the Dokie Ridge Wind Farm and Meikle Wind Farm were constructed. In 2015, Paper Excellence bought the Tembec Mill, which had been idle since 2012, and invested $50 million in upgrades. The mill opened in May 2015 only to undergo a maintenance shutdown in September of that year.

== Education ==
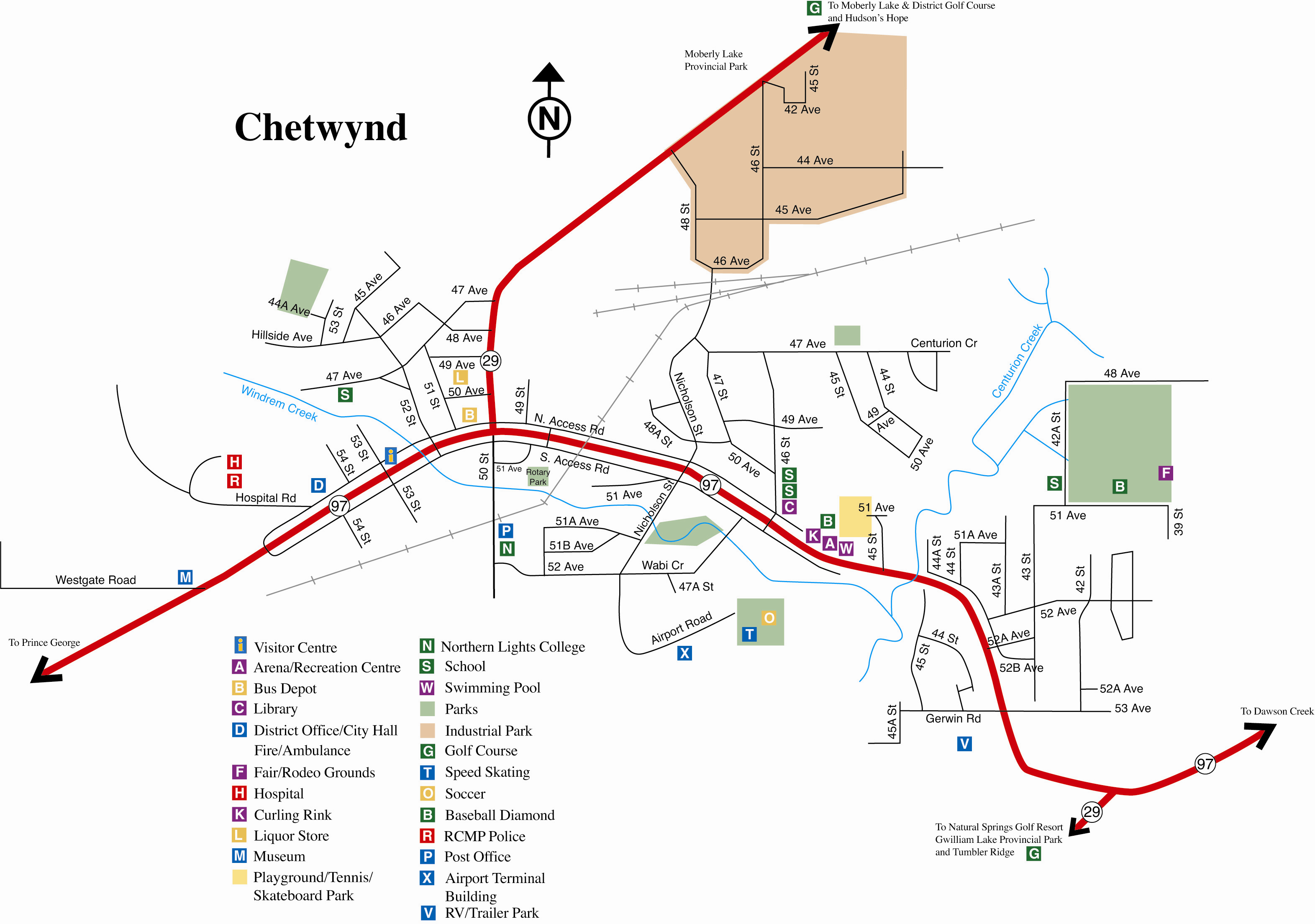
Chetwynd's roads, schools, and parks

The 2021 census estimated that 10.3% of people in Chetwynd between 20 and 64 years old graduated from a university, less than half of the 28.6% provincial average and 20.7% did not graduate from secondary school, 7.2% higher than the provincial average. Chetwynd's schools are administered by School District 59 Peace River South, which operates one secondary school and three primary schools: Chetwynd Secondary School, Don Titus Elementary, Windrem Elementary, and Little Prairie Elementary. Northern Lights College maintains a campus in Chetwynd, which has a 2003 enrolment of 170 students (based on full-time equivalents). It was established in 1976 with eight general interest and two university transfer courses.

== Infrastructure ==
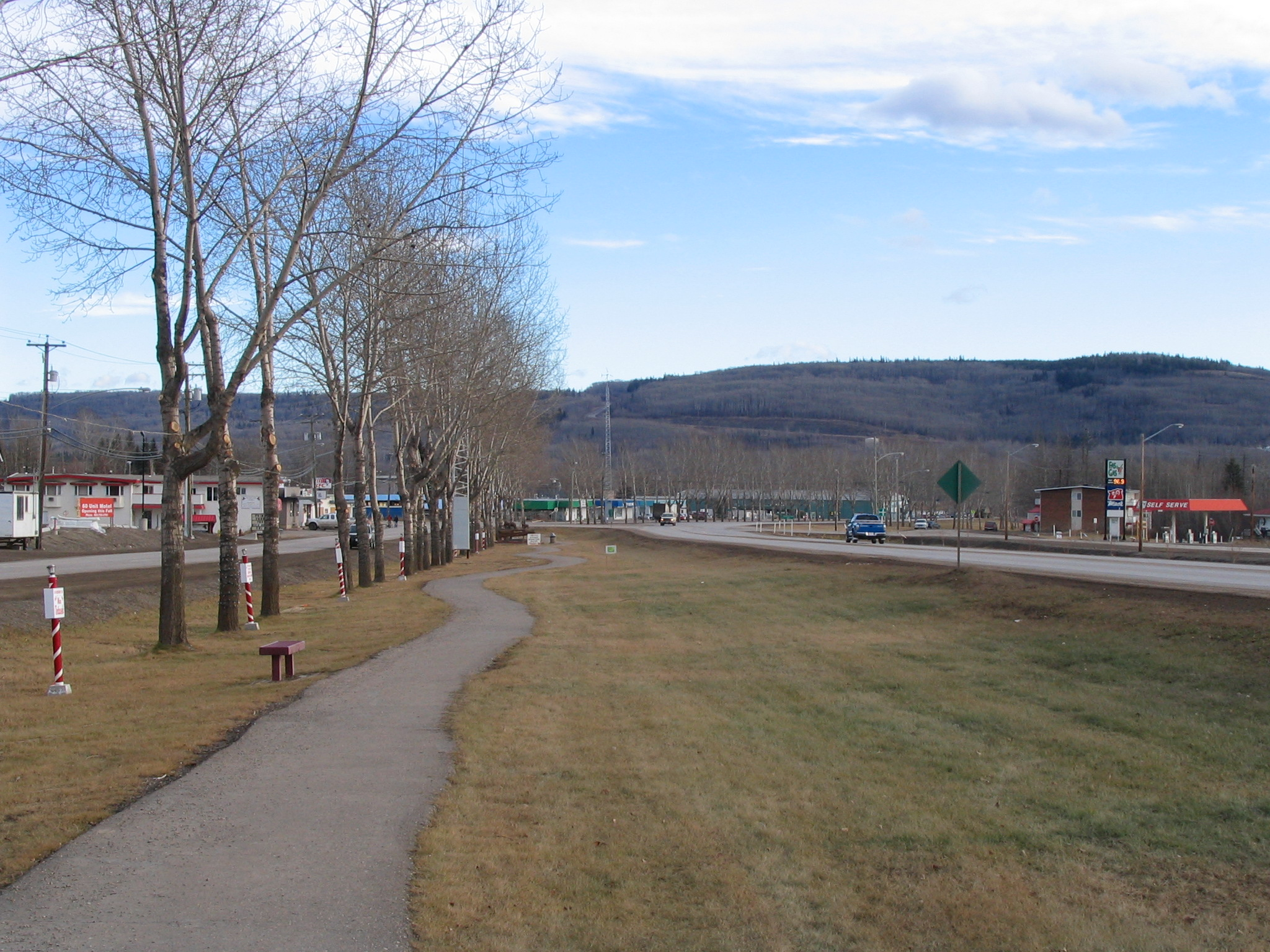
Looking east along Highway 97

The John Hart Highway portion of Highway 97 runs east–west through Chetwynd, connecting the town to Dawson Creek (102 km [63 mi] east) and Prince George (304 km [189 mi] south). Highway 29 (Don Philips Way) runs north–south through Chetwynd, connecting the town to Hudson's Hope (60 km [37 mi] north) and Tumbler Ridge (89 km [55 mi] southeast). The downtown core lies just west of the intersection of Highway 97 and Highway 29. Chetwynd's internal street network has 28 kilometres (17 mi) of paved road, which uses the highway as its main arterial road with parallel frontage roads for local trips. A site plan by the province in 1957 laid out the basic structure of the town.

Chetwynd has rail, air, and bus service for regional and provincial transportation needs. Rail lines enter Chetwynd from three directions: from Fort St. John in the north, from Dawson Creek in the east, and from Prince George in the south. Pacific Great Eastern Railway (later BC Rail) ran passenger service to Chetwynd until 1990. Since then the trains have been used solely for moving resources such as lumber and coal. The District of Chetwynd has operated the unmanned Chetwynd Airport (IATA: YCQ) since 1970. The runway was paved in 1975 but only handles chartered flights and helicopters. A new airport terminal was constructed in 2008 by students at Northern Lights College. The closest airports with commercial airlines are at Fort St. John Airport and Dawson Creek Airport. Until 2018 Greyhound Lines maintained a bus stop in town on their Vancouver−Prince George−Dawson Creek route.

The District uses the northeast-flowing Pine River as both a source of drinking water and an outlet for sewage. The former comes from an intake pipe southwest of town. Its sewerage consists of 28 kilometres (17 mi) of sanitary sewers and 3 kilometres (1.9 mi) of storm sewers. Raw sewage is processed by a five-cell lagoon system and released into the Pine River south of town. The water supply was briefly shut off in 2000 when an oil pipeline along the Pine River ruptured, spilling 990 cubic metres (6,200 bbl) of oil into the river. Electricity is supplied by BC Hydro from the W. A. C. Bennett and Peace Canyon dams and natural gas by Pacific Northern Gas. In 2019, the federal and provincial governments announced a joint project to increase electricity supply to the Peace Region. The project expands on existing infrastructure by building two 230 kilovolt transmission lines from the under-construction Site C dam and its substation to existing stations approximately 30 kilometres (19 mi) east of Chetwynd.

== Culture and recreation ==
The Little Prairie Heritage Museum, located in one of the town's oldest buildings (a converted post office dating to 1949) displays artefacts and re-creations of the town's frontier times, and nostalgia pieces from the construction of infrastructure through the Rocky Mountains. A public art program, started in 1987, showcases over 50 chainsaw carvings spread throughout town with a downtown monument that declares Chetwynd the "Chainsaw Sculpture Capital of the World". The town's first annual chainsaw carving contest was held in June 2005. A regular contestant in the Communities in Bloom contest, the District built four wind turbines in 2004 to power decorative lights on 25 large trees along its boulevard as an entry to the WinterLights Celebration contest. A statue of a lumberjack entitled "Chetwynd, the Little Giant of the Great Peace", measuring 2.7 metres (8 ft 10 in) tall and located alongside the highway, has stood in the town since 1967. The statue has been periodically altered by replacing the axe with other accessories, such as a lasso, rifle, gold pan and pitchfork, or dressed in other outfits, like a Santa suit.

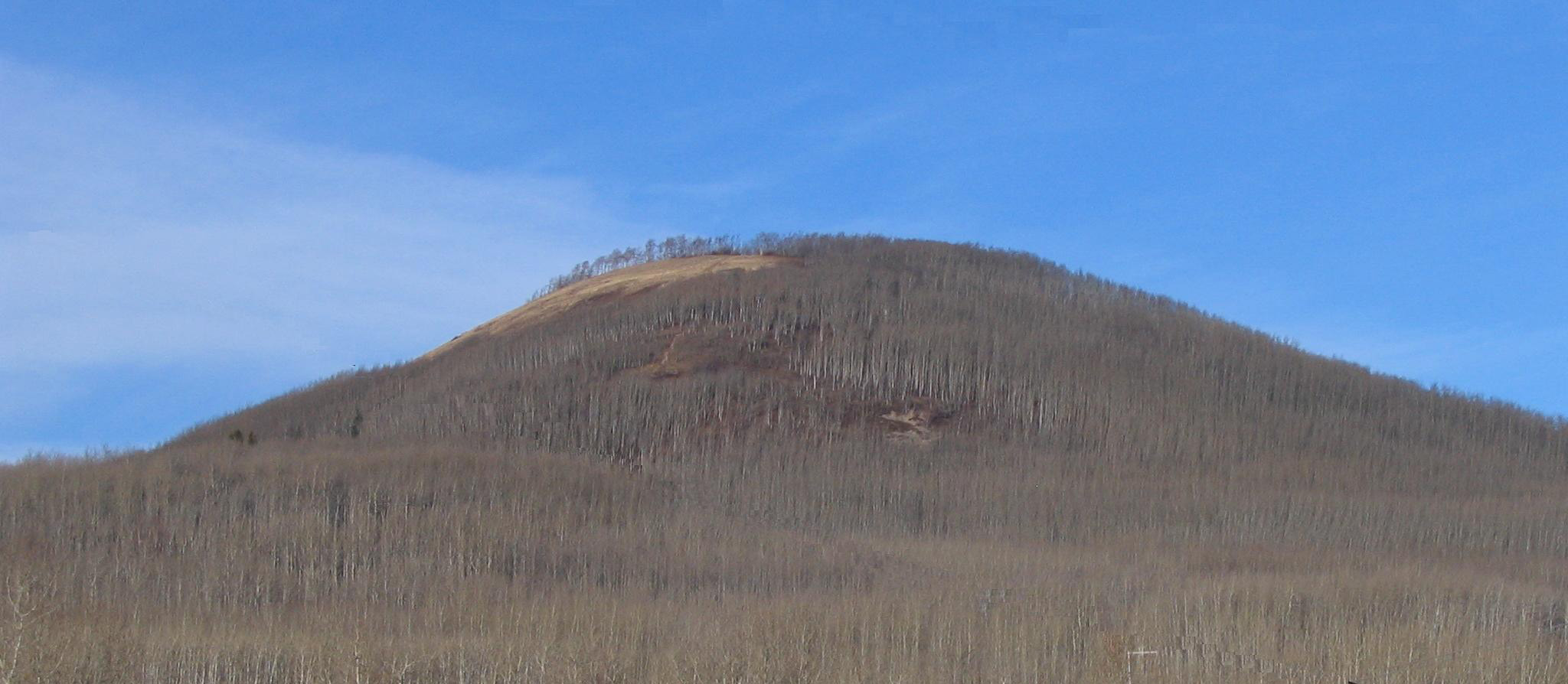
Ol' Baldy, locally known as Mount Baldy

For outdoor recreation, a community forest on Mount Baldy provides residents with trails for walking, hiking, cycling, and cross-country skiing close to home. There is downhill skiing about 100 kilometres (62 mi) west of town (and closer to the Rocky Mountains) at the Powder King Mountain Resort. Nearby provincial parks include Gwillim Lake Provincial Park (56 km [35 mi] southeast), Moberly Lake Provincial Park (25 km [16 mi] northwest), Pine River Breaks Provincial Park (15 km [9.3 mi] east), East Pine Provincial Park (30 km [19 mi] east), and Pine Le Moray Provincial Park (70 km [43 mi] southwest). Chetwynd has an indoor rodeo facility, an outdoor speed skating oval, and a general recreation complex which has within it an ice arena, swimming pool and curling rink, among other facilities.

== Media ==
Since the 1970s, the Chetwynd Communications Society has worked to establish radio and television service. For many years, they rebroadcast pre-recorded content to Chetwynd and surrounding communities via a telecommunications tower on nearby Wabi Mountain. On 5 December 1996, 94.5 CHET-FM—the town's first radio station—went on-air. Since then the station has expanded with a repeater tower in Dawson Creek at 104.1 and is now known collectively as Peace FM. Its programming uses a series of specialty programs such as metal, gospel, hard rock, and dance. Chetwynd's community television station, CHET-TV channel 55, began broadcasting on 8 March 2000, in a ceremony attended by Adrienne Clarkson, then Governor General. The Chetwynd Communications Society also owns a series of low-powered repeaters that rebroadcasts selected Canadian and American stations via satellite. In addition, Chetwynd is served by CBUZ-FM 93.5, repeating CBC Radio One station CBYG-FM from Prince George.

Two periodicals covered local news: the weekly newspaper Chetwynd Echo and the biweekly newsletter Coffee Talk Express. The Chetwynd Echo was created by the Chamber of Commerce in 1959 as The Chinook in a tabloid format. It was renamed the Weekly Advertiser in 1962 and the Chetwynd Echo in 1971 when it switched to a broadsheet format. The Chetwynd Echo closed in 2016, publishing its final edition on 6 January.

== Government and politics ==
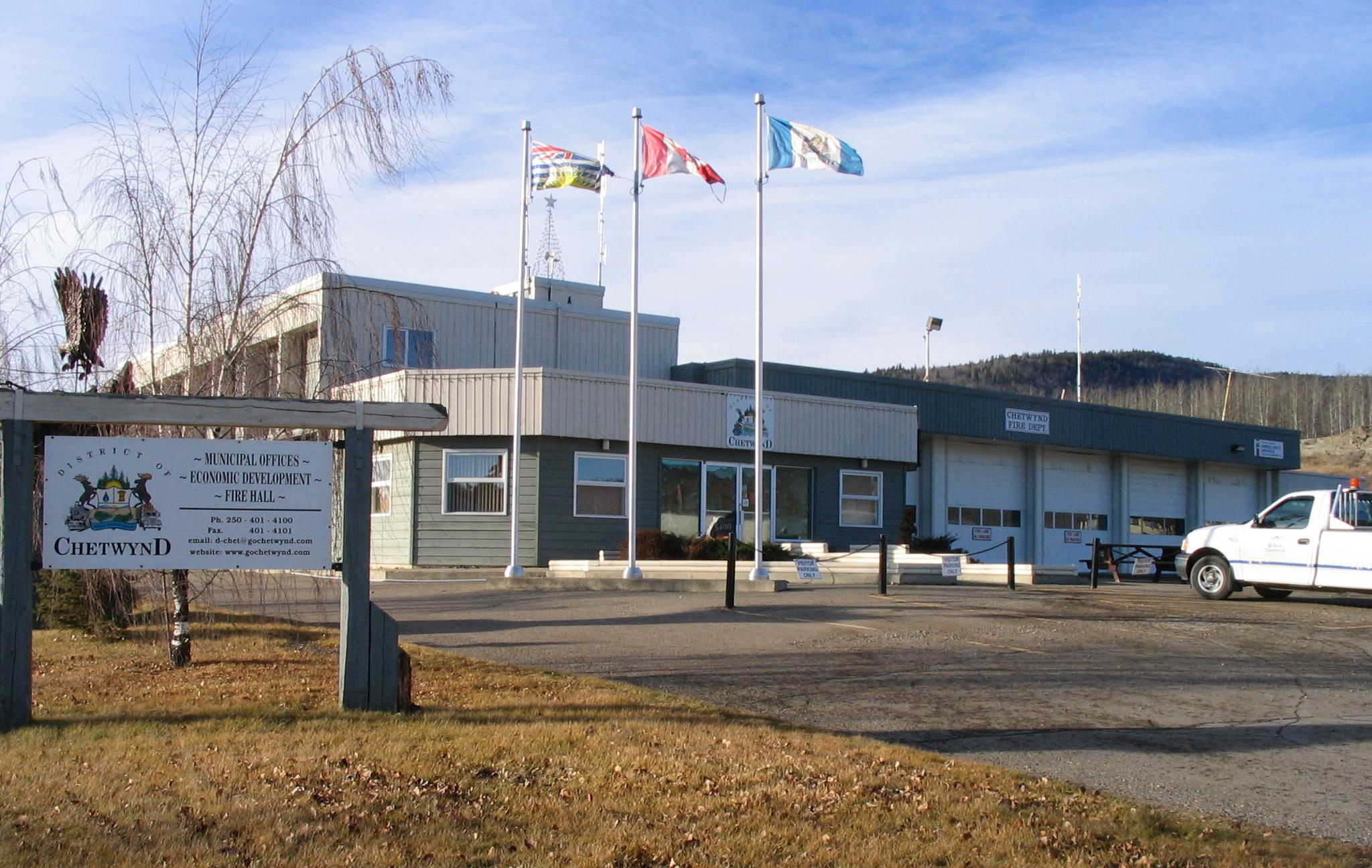
Chetwynd municipal hall, fire hall, and ambulance bay

The District of Chetwynd's council-manager form of municipal government is headed by a mayor (who also represents Chetwynd on the Peace River Regional District's governing board) and a six-member council. These positions, plus two school board trustees, are subject to at-large elections every three years. Mayor Allen Courtoreille was first elected in 2018. He was preceded by Merlin Nichol (2011–2018) and Evan Saugstad (2003–2011), and long-time mayor Charlie Lasser. The city funds a volunteer fire department, which services the town and nearby rural communities. It also maintains the sewer, water, local road, sidewalk, street lighting, animal control, building inspection, park, and recreation services. The city also partially funds a ten officer Royal Canadian Mounted Police detachment, which covers the municipality and nearby rural communities.

The province staffs a government agent office in Chetwynd for access to licenses, permits, and government programs. Through Northern Health the province operates the five-bed Chetwynd General Hospital. As part of the Peace River South provincial electoral district, it is represented in the Legislative Assembly of British Columbia by Mike Bernier of the BC United party, formerly the BC Liberals, who was first elected in the 2013 provincial election. Before Bernier, Peace River South was represented by Blair Lekstrom between 2001 and 2013, and by Jack Weisgerber, between 1986 and 2001, of the British Columbia Social Credit Party (1986–1994) and Reform Party of British Columbia (1994–2001). In 1996 as leader of the Reform Party, Weisgerber won re-election despite placing second in the Chetwynd polls to the BC Liberal Party candidate.

Chetwynd is located in the Prince George—Peace River—Northern Rockies riding which sends a member of parliament to the federal House of Commons. The town has been represented by Conservative Party member Bob Zimmer since the May 2011 federal election. Prior to Zimmer, the town was represented by Jay Hill, also of the Conservative Party, from 1993 to 2010. Before Hill, the riding was represented by former Chetwynd mayor Frank Oberle Sr. of the Progressive Conservative Party. Oberle was elected Chetwynd's mayor in 1968, its MP in 1972, and was appointed to be Canada's Minister of Science and Technology in 1985 and its Minister of Forestry in 1989 during the 33rd Canadian Parliament.

== Freedom of the District honour ==
The following have received the Freedom of the District honour from Chetwynd.

=== Individuals ===
- Yvonne Elden: 2007

== Notable people ==
- Denny Morrison, Olympian speed skater
- Dody Wood, former professional ice hockey left winger
