= Kiskatinaw Provincial Park =

Provincial park in British Columbia, Canada

- IUCN category II (national park)
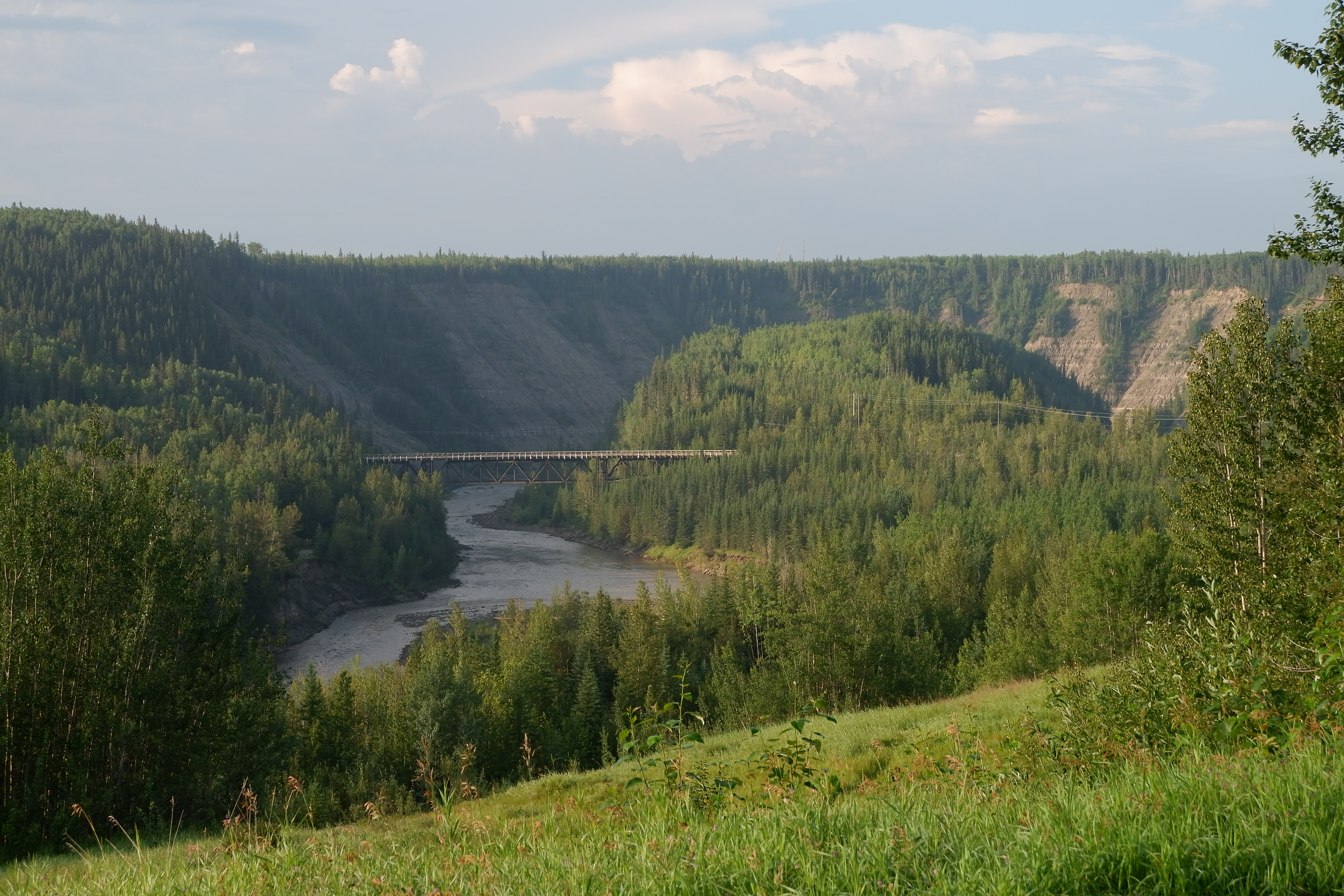
- Kiskatinaw River gorge and the historic Kiskatinaw Bridge as viewed from the west

- Location within British Columbia
- Interactive map of Kiskatinaw Provincial Park
- Location: Peace River RD, British Columbia, Canada
- Nearest town: Dawson Creek
- Coordinates: 55°57′34″N 120°33′52″W
- Area: 58 ha (140 acres)
- Established: May 1, 1962
- Governing body: BC Parks

Kiskatinaw Provincial Park is a provincial park located in Peace River Regional District in British Columbia, Canada. It was established on May 1, 1962, to protect a prominent horseshoe-shaped incised meander in the Kiskatinaw River where a historic curved bridge crosses the river along the original alignment of the Alaska Highway.

== History ==
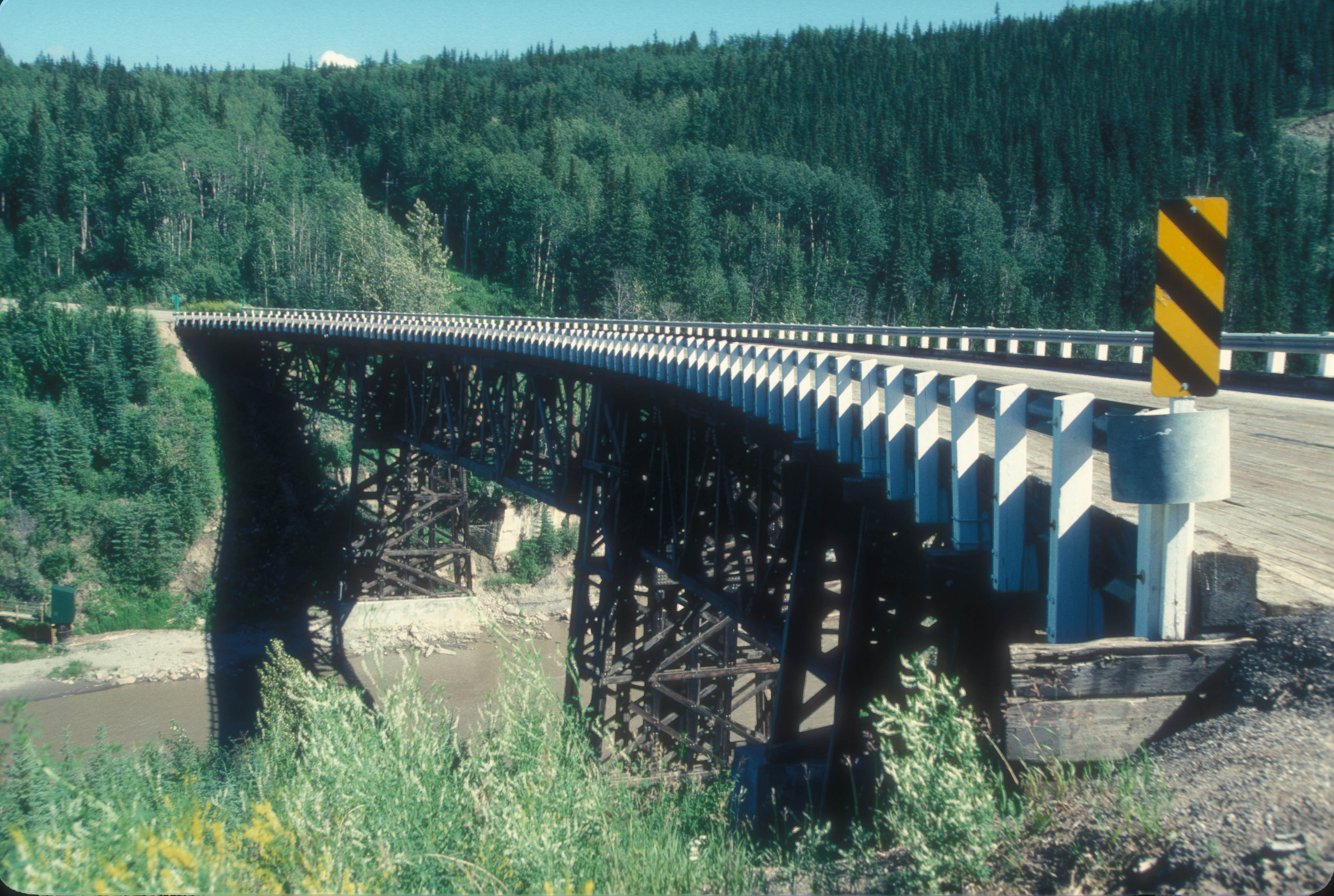
Kiskatinaw Bridge

In 1942, following the Japanese bombing of Pearl Harbor, the governments of Canada and the United States initiated the construction of the Alaska Highway to link the U.S. territory of Alaska with the rest of the North American road network. The initial alignment of the highway called for the construction of a curved, banked, wooden trestle bridge across a horseshoe-shaped incised meander of the Kiskatinaw River. Construction of the bridge took only nine months to complete. It has a length of 57.9 metres (190 ft) and a nine-degree curve.

On May 1, 1962, the site of the bridge and the incised meander were protected within Kiskatinaw Provincial Park.

In 1978, the British Columbia Ministry of Highways and Public Works constructed a new bridge 3 kilometres (1.86 mi) west of the original bridge and realigned the Alaska Highway there. As of a 2021 landslide, the bridge is no longer accessible to vehicles, and some of the road on the north bank is unmaintained. However the bridge is still accessible to foot traffic.

== Ecology ==
The park is forested with balsam poplar, white spruce and trembling aspen. Moose and deer may be viewed around the campsite. Squirrels, chipmunks and various songbirds are more common visitors.

== Recreation ==
The following recreational activities are available: vehicle accessible camping and swimming. The primary purpose of the park is to provide weekend recreational opportunities for local residents. The secondary purpose of the park is the provide a stopover point for tourists travelling the Alaska Highway.

== See also ==
- List of British Columbia Provincial Parks
- List of Canadian provincial parks
