= Pine River Breaks Provincial Park =

Provincial park in British Columbia

- IUCN category II (national park)
- Location within British Columbia
- Interactive map of Pine River Breaks Provincial Park
- Location: British Columbia, Canada
- Nearest city: Chetwynd
- Coordinates: 55°41′30″N 121°22′14″W
- Area: 6.14 km^{2} (2.37 sq mi)
- Established: June 29, 2000
- Governing body: BC Parks

Pine River Breaks Provincial Park is a provincial park in British Columbia, Canada in the Peace River Lowland between the communities of East Pine and Chetwynd.

== See also ==
- East Pine Provincial Park
