= East Pine Provincial Park =

Provincial park in British Columbia, Canada

- IUCN category II (national park)
- Location within British Columbia
- Interactive map of East Pine Provincial Park
- Location: Peace River Land District, British Columbia, Canada
- Nearest city: Chetwynd, BC
- Coordinates: 55°43′08″N 121°13′24″W
- Area: 14.2 ha (35 acres)
- Established: December 9, 1982
- Governing body: BC Parks

East Pine Provincial Park is a provincial park in British Columbia, Canada, located east of Chetwynd in the Peace River Block at the junction of the Pine and Murray rivers. The park was established in 1982 and is 14.2 hectares (35 acres) in size.

== See also ==
- Pine River Breaks Provincial Park
