= Peace River Corridor Provincial Park =

Provincial park in British Columbia, Canada

- IUCN category II (national park)
- Location within British Columbia
- Interactive map of Peace River Corridor Provincial Park
- Location: British Columbia, Canada
- Nearest city: Fort St. John
- Coordinates: 56°06′09″N 120°13′19″W
- Area: 20.14 km^{2} (7.78 sq mi)
- Established: June 29, 2000
- Governing body: BC Parks

Peace River Corridor Provincial Park is a 2014 ha provincial park in British Columbia, Canada. It is located on the banks of the Peace River, at the confluence with Kiskatinaw River, downstream from Taylor. It is in the Boreal White and Black Spruce biogeoclimatic zone within the Peace Lowlands ecosection. It is used by ungulates as a winter range and by migratory waterfowl as a staging area.
