= Moberly Lake Provincial Park =

Provincial park in British Columbia, Canada

- IUCN category II (national park)
- Location within British Columbia
- Interactive map of Moberly Lake Provincial Park
- Location: British Columbia, Canada
- Nearest city: Chetwynd
- Coordinates: 55°48′29″N 121°41′42″W
- Area: 1.02 km^{2} (0.39 sq mi)
- Established: May 31, 1966
- Governing body: BC Parks

Moberly Lake Provincial Park is a provincial park in British Columbia, Canada.
