= HD Mining International =

Canadian mining company

HD Mining International Limited
- Type: Private
- Industry: Mining
- Founded: 2011
- Headquarters: Vancouver, British Columbia, Canada
- Key people: Penggui Yan, Chair; Jody Skimkus, Vice-President
- Products: Bituminous coal
- Number of employees: 200+
- Parent: Huiyong Holdings Group (55%); Canadian Dehua Lvliang Limited (40%)

HD Mining International is a mining company based in Vancouver, British Columbia, Canada. It is involved in the Murray River Project, a longwall coal mine in Peace River Country near Tumbler Ridge, British Columbia.

HD Mining was registered as BC enterprise in 2011 and based out of Vancouver. HD is owned by Chinese-based Huiyong Holdings Group's Huiyong Holdings BC, Canadian Dehua Lvliang Limited and a third undisclosed shareholder.

Most of current HD workforce are temporary foreign workers from China, mostly working in the Murray River mine, which has led to a controversy over hiring overseas workers instead of Canadian workers. HD Mining has indicated that TFW were hired to assess the site and that future employment for mining operations will shift to Canadians.

== Organization ==
Very little is publicly known of the corporate structure of HD Mining nor the partners of the firm. HD Mining's current headed by Chair Penggui Yan Other known personnel include Jody Shimkus, Vice-President and former associate minister of mines of British Columbia and Ye Qing, corporate consultant.
