= Dowling Creek (British Columbia) =

Coordinates: 55°58′43″N 122°18′43″W

Dowling Creek is a creek located in the Peace River Regional District of British Columbia. It flows northeast into Gething Creek, Williston Lake. The river is located southwest of Hudson's Hope.
