= Dowling Creek (Missouri) =

Stream in the American state of Missouri

Dowling Creek (also called Dulin Creek) is a stream in Jefferson County in the U.S. state of Missouri. It is a tributary to Heads Creek.

The stream headwaters arise at 38°21′12″N 90°35′19″W at an elevation of approximately 750 feet. The confluence with Heads Creek is at 38°25′00″N 90°35′03″W at an elevation of 443 feet. The stream passes under Missouri Route 30 about one mile before it enters Heads Creek.

Dowling Creek derives its name from a local family.

== See also ==
- List of rivers of Missouri
