= Bearhole Lake Provincial Park and Protected Area =

Provincial park in British Columbia, Canada

Bearhole Lake Provincial Park
- IUCN category II (national park)
- Location within British Columbia
- Interactive map of Bearhole Lake Provincial Park
- Location: Tumbler Ridge, British Columbia, Canada
- Nearest city: Tumbler Ridge
- Coordinates: 55°02′49″N 120°32′59″W
- Area: 12,705 ha (31,390 acres)
- Established: January 25, 2001
- Governing body: BC Parks
- Website: bcparks.ca/bearhole-lake-park/

Bearhole Lake Provincial Park is a provincial park in British Columbia, Canada. It is located 5 km east of the mining community of Tumbler Ridge, on the Alberta Plateau. Established in January 2001, the park includes 12,705 ha of land in the Boreal White and Black Spruce biogeoclimatic zones within the Kiskatinaw Plateau. It is a transition zone with mixed wood forests including spruce, pine, and larch. Bearhole Lake, the headwaters of the Kiskatinaw River, provides habitat for trumpeter swans, yellow perch, burbot, rainbow trout, and northern pike.
