= Gwillim Lake Provincial Park =

Provincial park in British Columbia, Canada

- IUCN category II (national park)
- Location within British Columbia
- Interactive map of Gwillim Lake Provincial Park
- Location: Peace River Land District, British Columbia, Canada
- Nearest city: Chetwynd, BC
- Coordinates: 55°25′59″N 121°14′00″W
- Area: 32,326 ha (79,880 acres)
- Established: February 10, 1971
- Governing body: BC Parks

Gwillim Lake Provincial Park is a provincial park in British Columbia, Canada.
