= One Island Lake Provincial Park =

Provincial park in British Columbia, Canada

- IUCN category II (national park)
- Location within British Columbia
- Interactive map of One Island Lake Provincial Park
- Location: British Columbia, Canada
- Nearest city: Pouce Coupe
- Coordinates: 55°18′20″N 120°16′45″W
- Area: 0.61 km^{2} (0.24 sq mi)
- Established: August 31, 1978
- Governing body: BC Parks

One Island Lake Provincial Park is a provincial park in British Columbia, Canada. The park is 59 hectares in size. One Island Lake is located 60 kilometres southeast of, and provides drinking water to, Dawson Creek, British Columbia, and is on the Alberta Plateau.

== History ==
The park was established 1963.

== Conservation ==
Established between the Kiskatinaw River and the West Kiskatinaw River, the park provides representation of the Kiskatinaw Plateau ecosection. Common animal species seen in the park are white-tail and mule deer, moose, black bears, and beavers. The lake is stocked annually with brook and rainbow trout. The park was created mainly for recreational purposes.

== Recreation ==
The following recreational activities are available: vehicle accessible camping, picnicking, swimming, canoeing and kayaking, boating, windsurfing, fishing, and waterskiing.

== See also ==
- List of British Columbia Provincial Parks
- List of Canadian provincial parks
