= Kiskatinaw River =

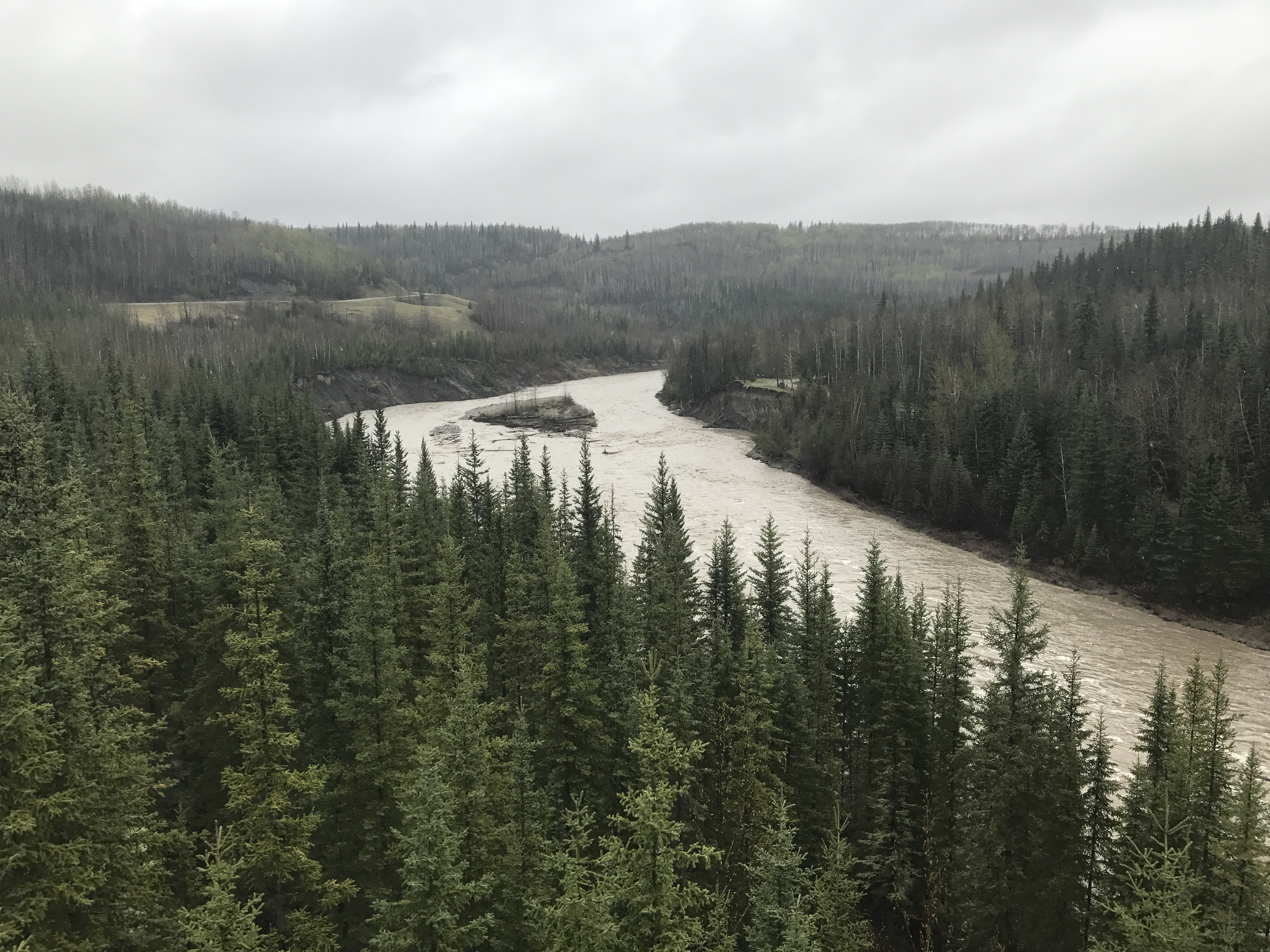
- Kiskatinaw River in Kiskatinaw Provincial Park

Location
- Country: Canada
- Province: British Columbia
- District: Peace River Land District

Physical characteristics
- Source
  - location: Bearhole Lake, Bearhole Lake Provincial Park and Protected Area
  - coordinates: 55.04377°N 120.67515°W
  - elevation: 1,050 m (3,440 ft)
- Mouth
  - location: Peace River
  - coordinates: 55.04377°N 120.67515°W
  - elevation: 395 m (1,296 ft)

Kiskatinaw (Cree for "cutbank" or "river with steep banks") is a tributary of the Peace River in northeastern British Columbia, Canada.

Bearhole Lake Provincial Park and Protected Area is established around the headwaters of the river, and One Island Lake Provincial Park is located on the beginning course. The Kiskatinaw Provincial Park is established on the mid course of the river, east of the Alaska Highway, along the old alignment of the highway, at the site of a curved wooden bridge. This bridge was constructed with the Alaska Highway during the Second World War. Its curved design strategically helped prevent attacks from bombs. Due to its hairpin curve, completion took nine months.

Fishing for walleye pike and rainbow trout is an attraction on the lower course of the river.

The river gives the name to the Kiskatinaw Formation, a siliciclastic formation of Carboniferous (Mississippian) age.

== Course ==
The river originates in the foothills of the Canadian Rockies, from Bearhole Lake in Bearhole Lake Provincial Park and Protected Area, at an elevation of approximately 1,050 metres (3,440 ft). It flows north and east, where it receives the waters of Sunderman Creek, then north, flowing by One Island Lake Provincial Park, after which it merges with the West Kiskatinaw River. It continues north through the Upper Cutbank, then receives the Brassey Creek. It parallels Highway 52 on the eastern edge of Sunset Prairie, west of Bear Mountain. It is crossed by Highway 97 and then by the Alaska Highway before it turns north-east. It then flows through a canyon until it merges into the Peace River. It flows into the Peace River west of the Alberta/British Columbia border, within the limits of the Peace River Corridor Provincial Park, east of Taylor.

== Tributaries ==
- Bearhole Lake
- Blackhawk Lake
- Sunderman Creek
- Borden Creek
- Ministik Creek
- One Island Lake
- West Kiskatinaw River
- Oetata Creek
  - Halfmoon Creek
- Brassey Creek
- Tremblay Creek
- Fox Creek
  - Livingstone Creek
- Sunset Creek
- Coal Creek
- Mica Creek

== See also ==
- List of rivers of British Columbia
