= Slim Williams =

Clyde Charles "Slim" Williams (January 14, 1881 – October 9, 1974) was a promoter of the Alaska Highway in the 1930s.

Born in California, Willams had first arrived in Alaska in 1900 at the age of 19, looking for adventure. He spent the next three decades trapping, hunting, breeding dogs, and blazing trails throughout the frontier. In October 1929, he was recorded for the 1930 census as a 47-year-old hunter/fur trader born in California living with his wife Aileen in Jokona village (Gakona?) in the Chitina, Alaska, district.

In 1933, to show the viability of the Alaska Highway, Slim traveled down the proposed route by dogsled. He only used crude maps in what was previously unmapped territory. When the spring thaw made sledding impossible, he rigged up his sled with Model-T wheels and continued through the muddy Canadian plains toward his destination, the Century of Progress Chicago World's Fair. By the time he reached Seattle, he had become a minor celebrity. After the World's Fair had closed for the season, Slim and his team of half-bred wolf/dogs proceeded to Washington, D.C., where he camped in a city park and spent the winter discussing Alaskan concerns with legislators. He also met with President Franklin Roosevelt.

Slim returned to Chicago in the summer of 1934 and married his wife Gladys Pennington in 1936. The authorized biography by Richard Morenus does not mention any relationship prior to this marriage, but another memoir recounts an earlier marriage to Aileen Gallaher (see citations below).

In 1939 Williams made a second trip with John Logan down the proposed Alaska Highway route. This time he traveled during the summer with a 300-pound (140 kg) motorbike. He said he never missed a meal, but sometimes he got a few days behind. Logan documented this trip with video footage showing, among other things, how they cooked over the campfire, built boats, and crossed rivers (in one clip, they used a hand-powered tram to haul their motorcycles across). These videos are available at Alaska's Digital Archives (see external link below).

Slim Williams was a strong proponent of the Alaska Highway before World War II. However, officials decided that there was no need for a highway at that time. When they finally did build the highway in 1942, it went along a route east of the trail Slim had blazed in 1932/33. The decision-makers believed their chosen route would present greater opportunities for economic growth.

Later in life, Slim enjoyed success as a popular lecturer. He traveled around the country, entertaining his audiences with his stories about overcoming the challenges of the vast, frozen wilderness of the north.

Slim and Gladys lived in Old Town in Chicago on North Park Avenue. He died at Ravenswood Hospital at age 93 and was buried in Mitchell, Indiana, per his featured obituary in the Chicago Tribune.
