= Alcan–Beaver Creek Border Crossing =

Border crossing between Alaska, United States and Yukon, Canada

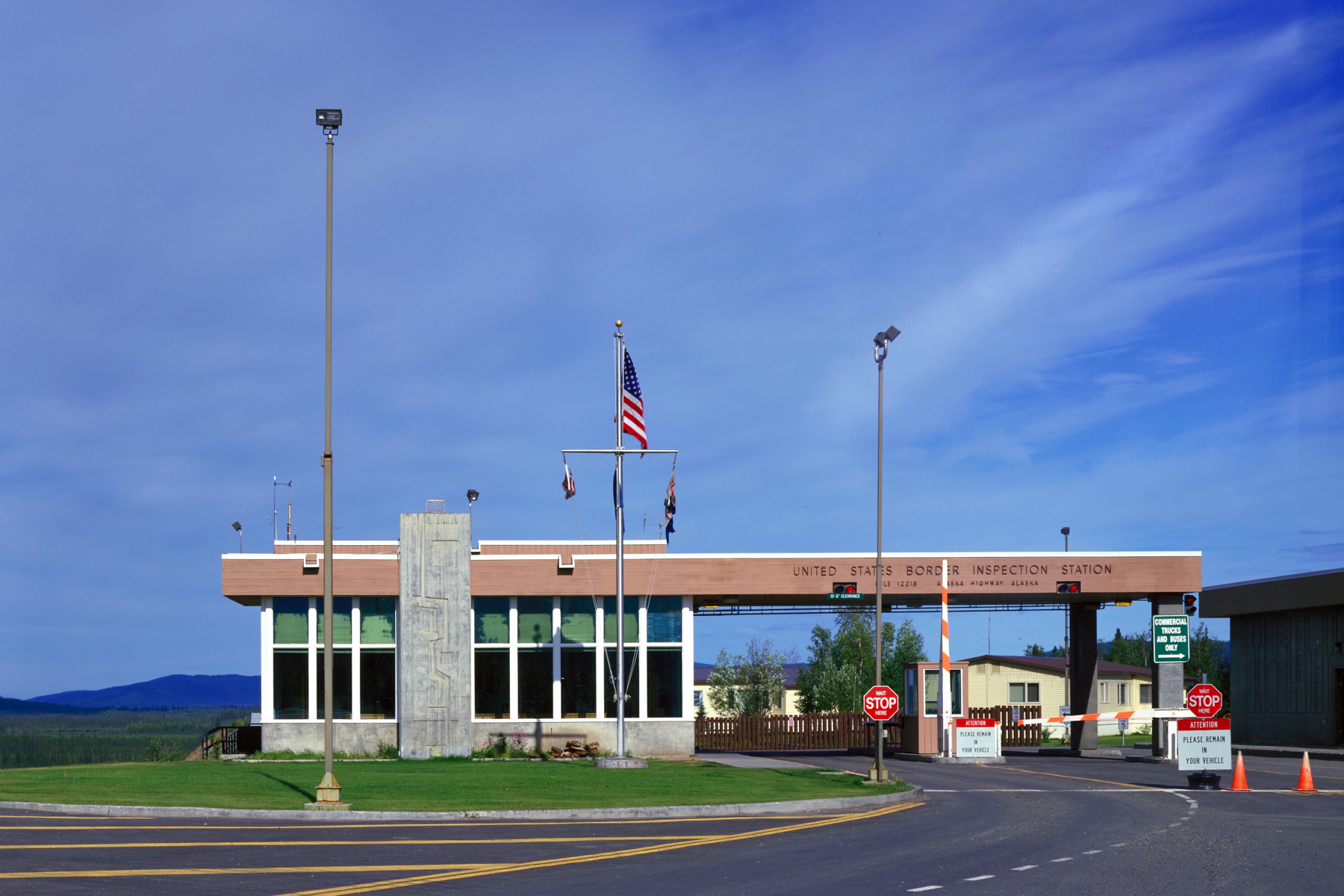
- US border inspection station at Alcan

Location
- Country: United States; Canada
- Location: AK-2 / Hwy 1; Milepost 1221.8 Alaska Hwy, Alcan Border, AK 99780; Alcan Highway, Beaver Creek, YT Y0B 1A0
- Coordinates: 62°36′55″N 141°0′5″W

Website
- cbp.gov/contact/ports/alcan; cbsa-asfc.gc.ca/do-rb/offices-bureaux

The Alcan–Beaver Creek Border Crossing (French: Poste frontalier d'Alcan–Beaver Creek) is a border crossing point between the United States and Canada. The Alcan Land Port of Entry (LPOE) on the Alaska Highway manages entry into the US, while the Beaver Creek Port of Entry just outside of Beaver Creek, Yukon, manages entry into Canada. The current buildings of the Alcan LPOE and Beaver Creek Point of Entry were opened in 1972 and 1983, respectively.

== Location and operations ==
The Alcan–Beaver Creek Border Crossing is serviced by the Alcan LPOE on the US side of the border and the Beaver Creek Point of Entry on the Canadian side. The Alcan LPOE is located in a remote area on the Alaska Highway, surrounded mostly by undisturbed forest, wetlands and tundra.

It is the only port of entry between interior Alaska and Yukon that offers year-round, 24-hour service for both personal and commercial traffic.

== US side ==
Until 1971, the US operated its Alaska–Yukon border station at Tok, Alaska, nearly 145 kilometres (90 mi) away from the border. This station inspected traffic entering the US on both the Alaska Highway and the Top of the World Highway. Between 1971 and 1972, US border inspection stations were constructed near the border both at Alcan and at the Poker Creek–Little Gold Creek Border Crossing. The Alcan LPOE was opened in 1972.

In 2024, the General Services Administration announced that the station would be rebuilt with sustainability in mind – using super-insulation and solar panels.

== Canadian side ==
In Canada, the Canada Border Services Agency had begun border inspection services after World War II, at a repurposed army building on mile 1206, north of Beaver Creek. The architects Pete Eikland and Billy Blair constructed a new customs building for Canada on mile 1220.5 sometime before the 1950s, but services were moved once again in 1958 to a new building in the middle of Beaver Creek. Due to its location and design, many tourists mistook the customs building for a gas station or food stand and drove past it. Canadian customs officers often chased after vehicles with a flashing light and siren to alert motorists before they left Beaver Creek. After years of petitioning by locals, customs services were moved once again in 1983 to a new steel building located past the Beaver Creek Airstrip, avoiding confusion. It is situated at 62°24′31″N 140°51′34″W, 28.6 kilometres (17.8 mi) away from the actual border, the furthest from the border crossing of any Canadian border station.

== See also ==
- Canada–United States border
- List of Canada–United States border crossings
