= Alcan Border, Alaska =

Census-designated place in Alaska, United States

- CDP
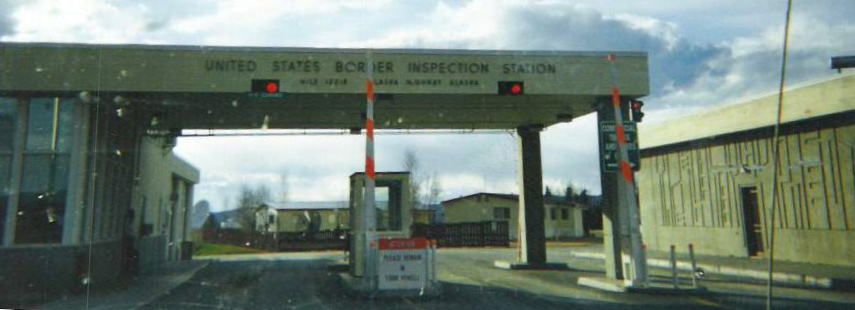
- The Canada–United States border crossing at Alcan Border

- Location within the state of Alaska
- Coordinates: 62°41′35″N 141°11′56″W
- Country: United States
- State: Alaska
- Census Area: Southeast Fairbanks

Government
  - State senator: Click Bishop (R)
  - State rep.: Mike Cronk (R)

Area
  - Total: 152.61 sq mi (395.25 km^{2})
  - Land: 151.74 sq mi (393.01 km^{2})
  - Water: 0.86 sq mi (2.24 km^{2})

Population (2020)
  - Total: 36
  - Density: 0.23/sq mi (0.09/km^{2})
- Time zone: UTC-9 (Alaska (AKST))
  - Summer (DST): UTC-8 (AKDT)
- ZIP code: 99780
- Area code: 907
- FIPS code: 02-01390

Alcan Border, also known as Port Alcan, is a census-designated place in the Southeast Fairbanks Census Area in the U.S. state of Alaska. Part of the Unorganized Borough, Alcan Border is the site of the Alcan - Beaver Creek Border Crossing, the main U.S. port of entry for people arriving in Alaska by road. As of the 2020 census, Alcan Border had a population of 36.

== Location and climate ==
Alcan Border is located at 62°39′42″N 141°9′40″W (Sec. 04, T026N, R022E, Copper River Meridian) in the Fairbanks Recording District. It is just inside the Alaska-Canada border, southeast of Northway and northwest of Beaver Creek, Yukon, along the Alaska Highway.

Alcan Border has a dry-winter continental subarctic climate (Köppen Dwc).

According to the United States Census Bureau, the CDP has a total area of 148.6 square miles (385 km^{2}), of which 147.9 square miles (383 km^{2}) is land and 0.7 square miles (1.8 km^{2}) (0.50%) is water.

Climate data for Port Alcan, Alaska, 1991–2020 normals, extremes 1985–present
Month	Jan	Feb	Mar	Apr	May	Jun	Jul	Aug	Sep	Oct	Nov	Dec	Year
Record high °F (°C)	45 (7)	47 (8)	52 (11)	70 (21)	82 (28)	88 (31)	94 (34)	89 (32)	78 (26)	60 (16)	44 (7)	55 (13)	94 (34)
Mean maximum °F (°C)	20.4 (−6.4)	26.5 (−3.1)	42.5 (5.8)	56.4 (13.6)	73.9 (23.3)	80.6 (27.0)	80.7 (27.1)	78.3 (25.7)	67.1 (19.5)	50.9 (10.5)	25.7 (−3.5)	20.7 (−6.3)	82.9 (28.3)
Mean daily maximum °F (°C)	−5.3 (−20.7)	6.1 (−14.4)	22.9 (−5.1)	42.8 (6.0)	57.9 (14.4)	67.0 (19.4)	69.3 (20.7)	65.0 (18.3)	52.9 (11.6)	31.0 (−0.6)	7.5 (−13.6)	−2.4 (−19.1)	34.6 (1.4)
Daily mean °F (°C)	−12.1 (−24.5)	−3.4 (−19.7)	8.4 (−13.1)	29.7 (−1.3)	45.6 (7.6)	55.3 (12.9)	57.9 (14.4)	53.0 (11.7)	41.5 (5.3)	22.6 (−5.2)	0.3 (−17.6)	−9.3 (−22.9)	24.1 (−4.4)
Mean daily minimum °F (°C)	−19.0 (−28.3)	−12.9 (−24.9)	−6.0 (−21.1)	16.7 (−8.5)	33.2 (0.7)	43.6 (6.4)	46.6 (8.1)	41.0 (5.0)	30.2 (−1.0)	14.3 (−9.8)	−7.0 (−21.7)	−16.1 (−26.7)	13.7 (−10.1)
Mean minimum °F (°C)	−41.7 (−40.9)	−37.5 (−38.6)	−28.5 (−33.6)	−1.8 (−18.8)	22.1 (−5.5)	33.0 (0.6)	37.7 (3.2)	31.1 (−0.5)	19.1 (−7.2)	−1.9 (−18.8)	−27.9 (−33.3)	−34.4 (−36.9)	−46.9 (−43.8)
Record low °F (°C)	−55 (−48)	−56 (−49)	−49 (−45)	−29 (−34)	10 (−12)	26 (−3)	30 (−1)	24 (−4)	0 (−18)	−26 (−32)	−47 (−44)	−52 (−47)	−56 (−49)
Average precipitation inches (mm)	0.26 (6.6)	0.26 (6.6)	0.14 (3.6)	0.21 (5.3)	0.88 (22)	2.23 (57)	2.71 (69)	1.73 (44)	1.02 (26)	0.51 (13)	0.65 (17)	0.39 (9.9)	10.99 (280)
Average snowfall inches (cm)	3.5 (8.9)	2.9 (7.4)	3.0 (7.6)	0.9 (2.3)	0.7 (1.8)	0.0 (0.0)	0.0 (0.0)	0.0 (0.0)	0.5 (1.3)	4.1 (10)	7.1 (18)	4.7 (12)	27.4 (69.3)
Average precipitation days (≥ 0.01 in)	3.7	3.1	2.3	2.4	5.7	12.5	13.0	11.0	8.0	5.4	5.6	4.6	77.3
Average snowy days (≥ 0.1 in)	3.9	3.1	2.4	1.1	0.5	0.0	0.0	0.0	0.6	4.1	5.3	4.4	25.4
Source 1: NOAA
Source 2: National Weather Service (mean maxima/minima 2006–2020)

== History, culture and demographics ==
Historical population
Census	Pop.	Note	%±
1990	27		—
2000	21		−22.2%
2010	33		57.1%
2020	36		9.1%
U.S. Decennial Census

Alcan Border first appeared on the 1990 U.S. Census as the census-designated place (CDP) of "Alcan." The name was changed to Alcan Border with the 2000 census.

The name is derived from the Alaska-Canadian (Alcan) highway, now the Alaska Highway, and the fact that its eastern boundary (as defined by the Census Bureau) is the Yukon Territory, Canada border.

The Alcan community consists of families employed by federal customs at the entry point into the U.S. and Alaska from Canada. Students attend school in Northway or are home-schooled through correspondence study. During the 2000 U.S. Census, total housing units numbered 13, and vacant housing units numbered 4. Vacant housing units used only seasonally numbered 2. Census data showed 11 residents as employed. The unemployment rate at that time was 0 percent, although 35.29 percent of all adults were not in the work force. The median household income was $65,000, per capita income was $21,938, and 0 percent of residents were living below the poverty level.

As of the census of 2000, there were 21 people, 9 households, and 6 families residing in the CDP. The population density was 0.1 inhabitants per square mile (0.039/km^{2}). There were 13 housing units at an average density of 0.1 per square mile (0.039/km^{2}). The racial makeup of the CDP was 66.67% White, 23.81% Native American, 4.76% Asian, 4.76% from other races. 9.52% of the population were Hispanic or Latino of any race.

There were 9 households, out of which 33.3% had children under the age of 18 living with them, 66.7% were married couples living together, and 33.3% were non-families. 33.3% of all households were made up of individuals, and none had someone living alone who was 65 years of age or older. The average household size was 2.33 and the average family size was 3.00.

In the CDP, the population was spread out, with 28.6% under the age of 18, 33.3% from 25 to 44, and 38.1% from 45 to 64. The median age was 35 years.

The median income for a household in the CDP was $65,000, and the median income for a family was $87,041. Males had a median income of $77,036 versus $0 for females. The per capita income for the CDP was $21,938. None of the population and none of the families were below the poverty line.

== Facilities and infrastructure ==
Alcan residents derive water from a piped community well system and individual wells. Approximately 60% of the homes have complete plumbing. A piped community sewage system serves the majority of households, and outhouses or individual septic tanks are also used. A central generator distributes electrical power. Electricity is provided by Alaska Power & Telephone. There are no state operated schools in the community. The nearest healthcare facilities are in Northway or Tok. Alcan is classified as an isolated village, it is found in EMS Region 1C in the Interior Region. Emergency services have highway and air access. Emergency service is provided by volunteers.

Alcan Border is part of the Alaska Gateway School District. Walter Northway School, a K-12 campus, serves community students.

Alaska does not have a state sales tax and Alcan Border is in the Unorganized Borough and therefore has no local tax authority.
