= The Milepost =

Guide book for the Alaska Highway

- The original 1949 Milepost
- Language: English
- Genre: Guidebook
- Publisher: Morris Communications
- Publication date: 1949

The Milepost is an extensive guidebook covering Alaska, the Yukon, the Northwest Territories, and British Columbia. It was first published in 1949 as a guide about traveling along the Alaska Highway, often locally referred to as "The ALCAN". It has since expanded to cover all major highways in the northwest corner of North America, including the Alaska Marine Highway. It is updated annually.

== History ==
The Milepost is packaged and distributed like a book (2008 edition: ISBN 978-189215431-6), but like the Yellow Pages it includes paid advertising. The original 1949 edition was a mere 72 pages, by 2014 it had expanded to 752 pages, detailing every place a traveler might eat, sleep, or just pull off the road for a moment on all of the highways of northwestern North America. In addition to the paid ads, descriptions are provided of interesting hikes or side trip drives near the highways, campgrounds, and other public facilities, as well as short histories of most of the settlements on the highways. Newer additions include special sections on selected areas popular with tourists, such as the Kenai Peninsula. It is also exhaustively cross-indexed and maps and charts are provided so that travelers can determine the total driving distance between any two points covered by the guide.

== Publishing ==
Since 1997 The Milepost has been published by Morris Communications and currently shares publishing offices with Alaska magazine. Beginning in 2009, The Milepost is also available in an interactive digital format or download.
