= Alaska Highway =

Highway in British Columbia, Yukon, and Alaska

- Alaska Highway highlighted in red

Route information
- Length: 1,387 mi (2,232 km) (as of 2012)
- Existed: 1942–present
- Component highways: Highway 97; Hwy 1; AK-2

Major junctions
- South end: Highway 2 / Highway 97 in Dawson Creek, BC
- Highway 29 in Charlie Lake, BC; Highway 77 near Fort Nelson, BC; Hwy 4 in Watson Lake, YT; Hwy 37 near Upper Liard, YT; Hwy 6 at Johnsons Crossing, YT; Hwy 8 at Jakes Corner, YT; Hwy 2 in Carcross Cutoff, YT and Whitehorse, YT; Hwy 3 at Haines Junction, YT; AK-5 at Tetlin Junction, AK; AK-1 in Tok, AK
- North end: AK-2 / AK-4 at Delta Junction, AK

Location
- Countries: Canada, United States
- Provinces: British Columbia
- States: Alaska
- Territories: Yukon

Highway system
- British Columbia provincial highways
- Territorial highways in Yukon; Miscellaneous
- Alaska Routes; Interstate; Scenic Byways
← Hwy 37	Hwy 1	→ Hwy 2

The Alaska Highway (French: Route de l'Alaska; also known as the Alaskan Highway, Alaska-Canadian Highway, or ALCAN Highway) is a highway in North America which was constructed during World War II to connect the contiguous United States with Alaska through Canada. It begins at the junction with a few Canadian highways in Dawson Creek, British Columbia, and runs to Delta Junction, Alaska, via Whitehorse, Yukon. When it was completed in 1942, it was about 1,700 miles (2,700 kilometres) long, but in 2012, it was only 1,387 mi (2,232 km). This is due to the realignments of the highway over the years, which has rerouted and straightened many sections. The highway opened to the public in 1948. Once legendary for being a rough, challenging drive, the highway is now paved over its entire length. Its component highways are British Columbia Highway 97, Yukon Highway 1, and Alaska Route 2.

An informal system of historic mileposts developed over the years to denote major stopping points. Delta Junction, at the end of the highway, makes reference to its location at "Historic Milepost 1422". It is at this point that the Alaska Highway meets the Richardson Highway, which continues 96 mi (155 km) to the city of Fairbanks. This is often regarded, though unofficially, as the northwestern portion of the Alaska Highway, with Fairbanks at Historic Milepost 1520. Mileposts on this stretch of highway are measured from the port of Valdez on Prince William Sound, rather than the Alaska Highway. The Alaska Highway is popularly (but unofficially) considered part of the Pan-American Highway, which extends south (despite its discontinuity in Panama) to Ushuaia, Argentina.

== History ==
=== Proposal ===
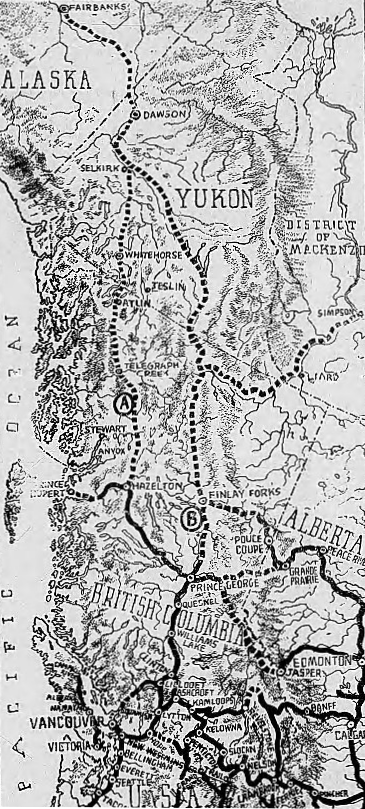
Overview map for routes A and B, 1938

Proposals for a highway to Alaska originated in the 1920s. Thomas MacDonald, director of the U.S. Bureau of Public Roads, dreamed of an international highway spanning the United States and Canada. In order to promote the highway, in 1933 Slim Williams originally traveled the proposed route by dogsled. Since much of the route would pass through Canada, support from the Canadian government was crucial. However, the Canadian government perceived no value in putting up the required funds to build the road, since the only part of Canada that would benefit was not more than a few thousand people in Yukon.

In 1929, the British Columbia government proposed a highway to Alaska to encourage economic development and tourism. American President Herbert Hoover appointed a board with American and three Canadian members to evaluate the idea. Its 1931 report supported the idea for economic reasons, but both American and Canadian members recognized that a highway would benefit the American military in Alaska. In 1933, the joint commission proposed the U.S. government contribute $2 million of the capital cost, with the $12 million balance borne by the Canadian and BC governments. The Great Depression and the Canadian government's lack of support caused the project to not proceed.

When the United States approached Canada again in February 1936, the Canadian government refused to commit to spending money on a road connecting the United States. The Canadians also worried about the military implications, fearing that in a war between Japan and the United States, the US military use of the road would breach Canadian neutrality. During a June 1936 visit to Canada, President Franklin D. Roosevelt told Prime Minister W. L. M. King that a highway to Alaska through Canada could be important in quickly reinforcing the American territory during a foreign crisis. Roosevelt became the first American to publicly discuss the military benefits of a highway in an August speech in Chautauqua, New York. He again mentioned the idea during King's visit to Washington in March 1937, suggesting that a $30 million highway would be helpful as part of a larger defense against Japan that would include, the Americans hoped, a larger Canadian military presence on the Pacific coast. Roosevelt remained a supporter of the highway, telling Cordell Hull in August 1937 that he wanted a road built as soon as possible. By 1938, Duff Pattullo, the BC premier, favored a route through Prince George. The U.S. offered either a $15 million interest-free loan, or to cover half the construction costs.

The December 7, 1941 attack on Pearl Harbor and beginning of the Pacific Theater in World War II, coupled with Japanese threats to the west coast of North America and the Aleutian Islands, changed the priorities for both nations. On February 6, 1942, the construction of the Alaska Highway was approved by the United States Army and the project received the authorization from the U.S. Congress and Roosevelt to proceed five days later. The Northwest Service Command was created in September 1942. It was responsible for the construction and maintenance of the Alaska Highway, the operation of the railway between Skagway, Alaska, and Whitehorse, and the Canol Project. Canada agreed to allow construction as long as the United States bore the full cost, and that the road and other facilities in Canada be turned over to Canadian authority after the war ended. It proved unimportant for the military because 99 percent of the supplies to Alaska during the war were sent by sea from San Francisco, Seattle, and Prince Rupert.

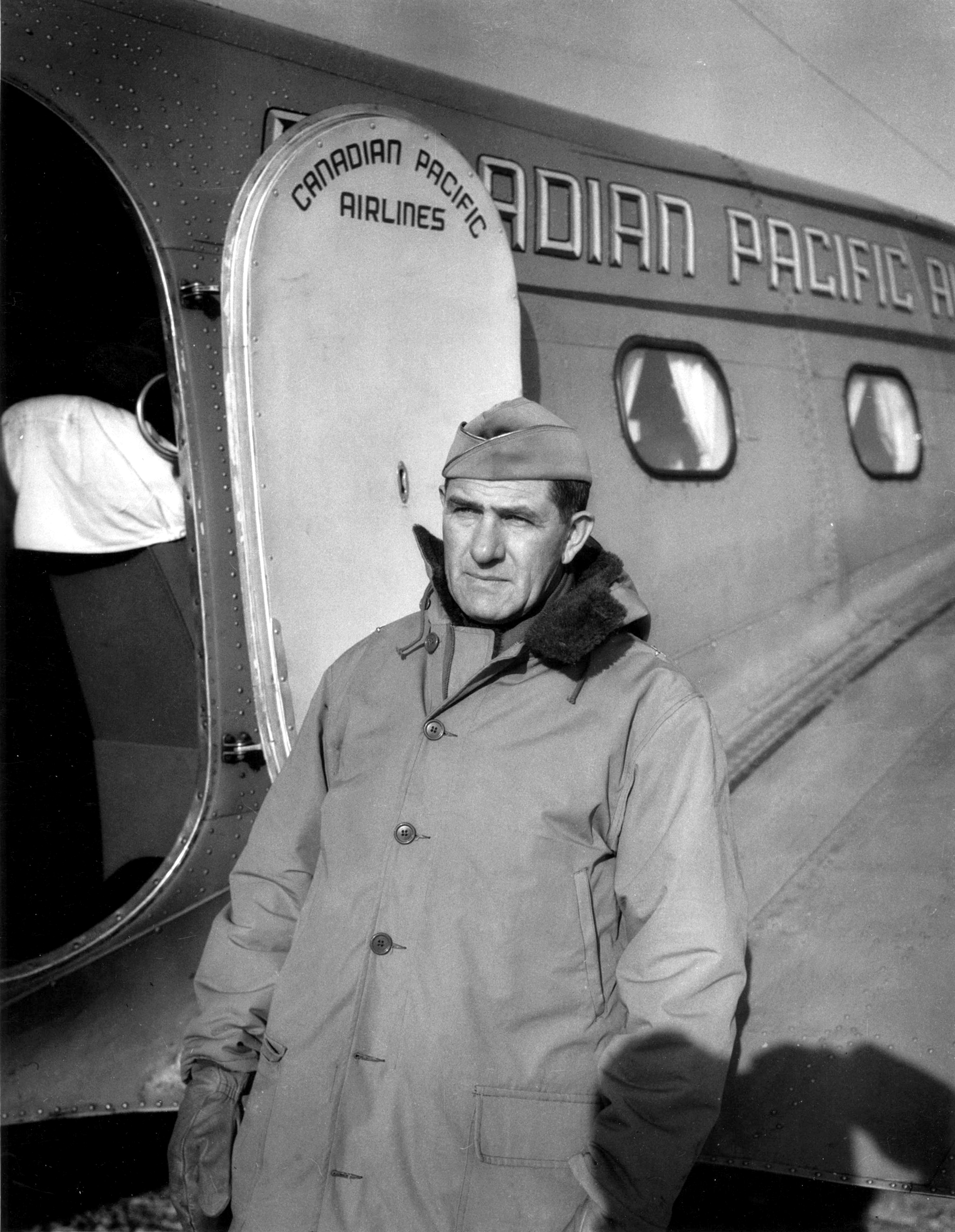
Brigadier General William M. Hoge, commanding general of the Alaska Highway Project, 1942

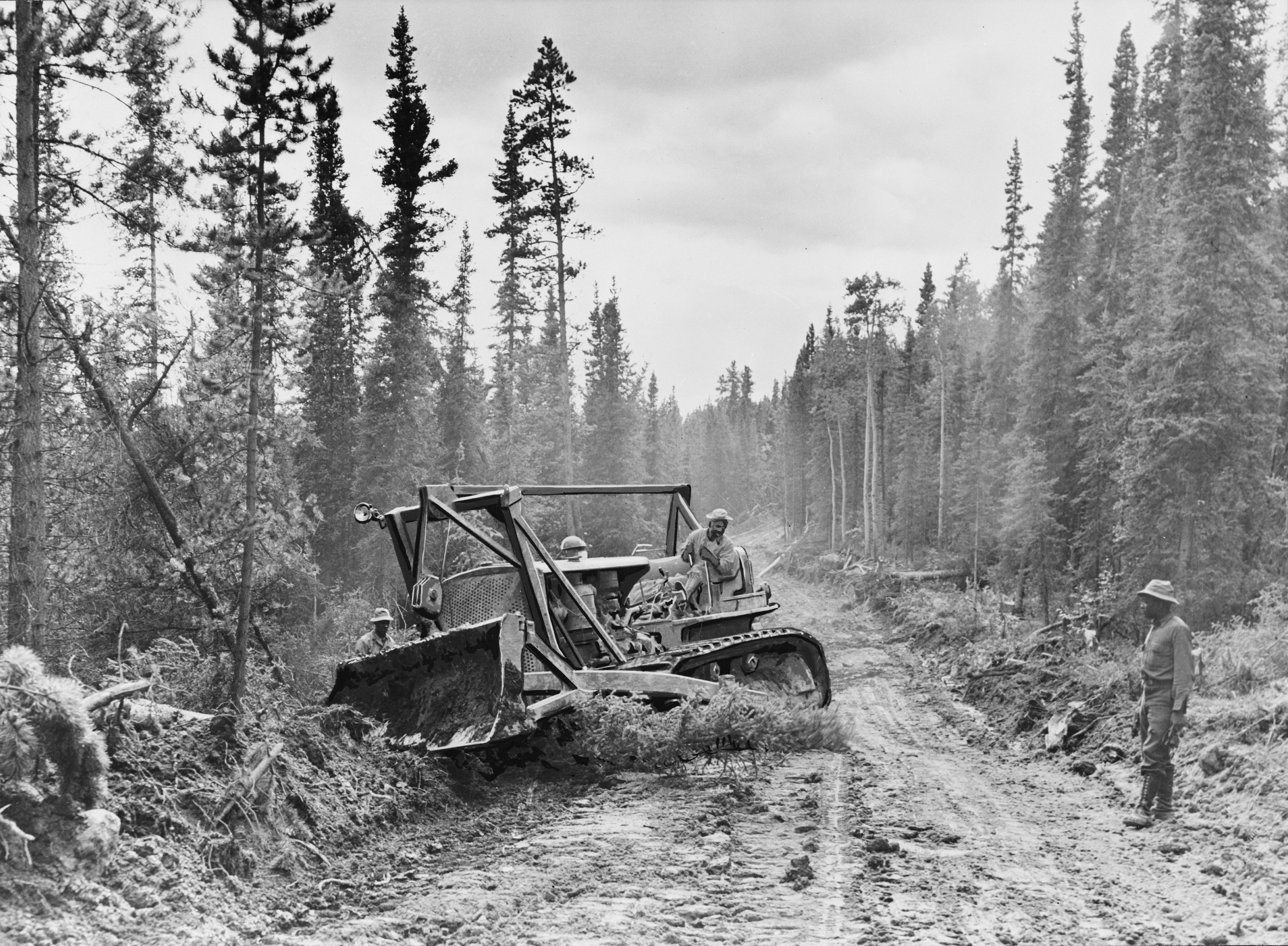
A caterpillar tractor with dozer widens the roadway of the Alaska Highway, 1942

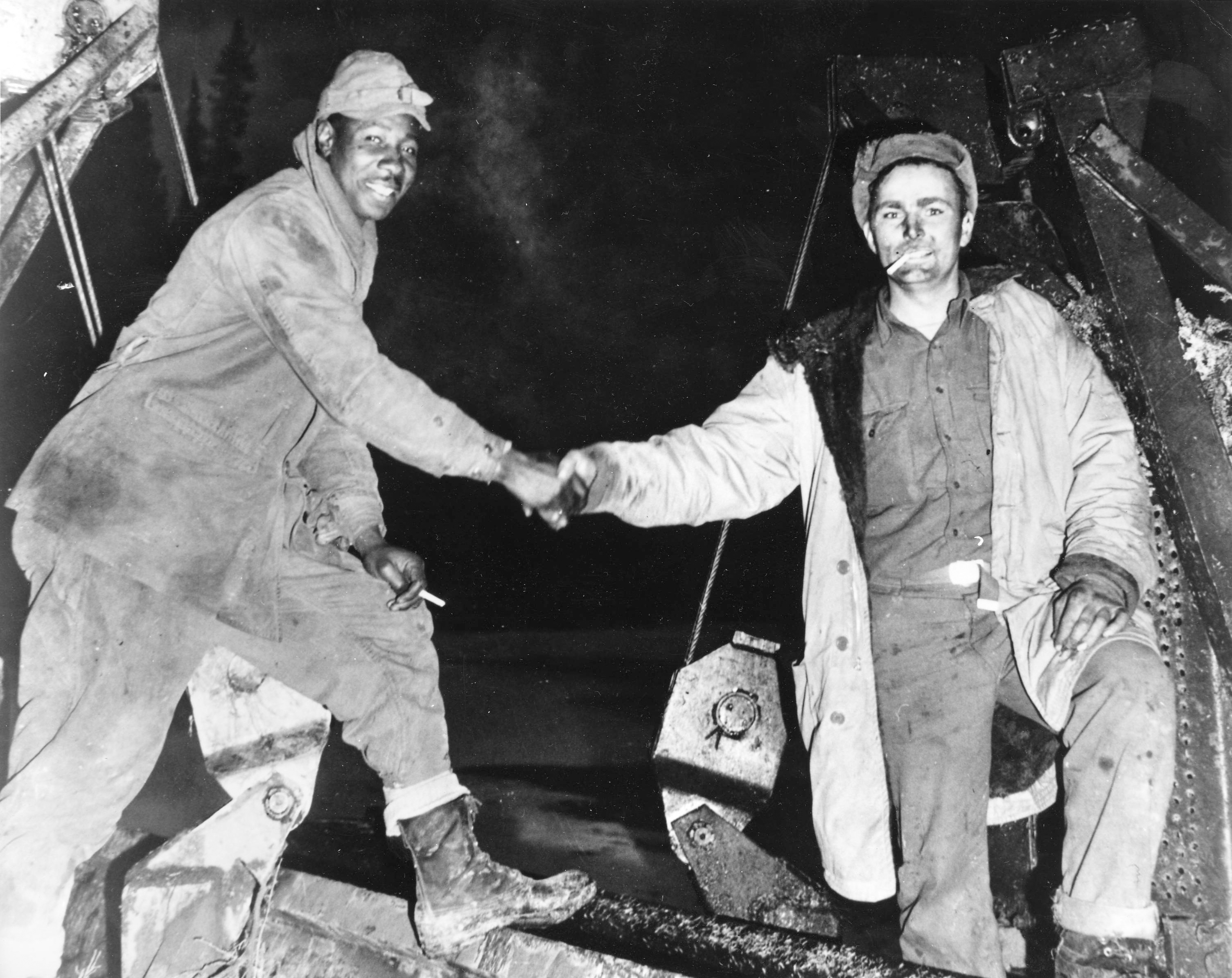
Soldiers of the U.S. Army Corps of Engineers meeting in the middle after completing construction of the Alaska Highway

==== Routing ====
The Americans preferred Route A which, starting at Prince George, went northwest to Hazelton, along the Stikine River, by Atlin, Teslin and Tagish Lakes, and from Whitehorse, Yukon, to Fairbanks, Alaska, via the Tanana Valley. However, the route was vulnerable to possible enemy attack from the sea, experienced steep grades and heavy snowfall, and had no airbases along the way.

The Canadians favored Route B. This also started at Prince George, but followed the Rocky Mountain Trench up the valleys of the Parsnip and Finlay Rivers to Finlay Forks and Sifton Pass, then north to Frances Lake and the Pelly River in the Yukon. From there it went to Dawson City and down the Yukon Valley to connect the Richardson Highway to Fairbanks. The advantages of this inland route was the safe distance from enemy planes, and 209 miles (336 km) shorter with lower elevations enabling lower construction and maintenance costs. The disadvantages were the bypassing of respective airbases, and Whitehorse, the principal town in the Yukon. Optional variations in the southern portion of this route were via Vanderhoof to the west or Monkman Pass to the east.

Route C, the Prairie option, advocated by the United States Army Corps of Engineers, was the one that was eventually chosen. It was far enough inland from enemy planes and it linked the airfields of the Northwest Staging Route that conveyed lend-lease aircraft from the United States to the Soviet Union. This option encountered more level terrain, not ascending a pass over 4,250 feet (1,300 m). There was also a railhead at Dawson Creek, British Columbia, and a winter trail from there to Fort Nelson, 300 miles (480 km) to the northwest. It followed the Rocky Mountain Trench toward Dawson City before turning west to Fairbanks.

=== Construction ===
The road was originally built mostly by the U.S. Army Corps of Engineers as a supply route during World War II. In 1942, the Army Corps of Engineers assigned more than 10,000 men, about a third of whom were black soldiers, members of the newly formed 93rd, 95th and 97th General Service Regiments of segregated African-American troops from the American South. There were four main thrusts in building the route: southeast from Delta Junction, Alaska, toward a linkup at Beaver Creek, Yukon; north then west from Dawson Creek (an advance group started from Fort Nelson, British Columbia, after traveling on winter roads on frozen marshland from railway stations on the Northern Alberta Railways); both east and west from Whitehorse after being ferried in via the White Pass and Yukon Route railway. The Army commandeered equipment of all kinds, including local riverboats, railway locomotives, and housing originally meant for use in southern California.

The official start of construction took place on March 9, 1942, after hundreds of pieces of construction equipment were moved on priority trains by the Northern Alberta Railways to the northeastern part of British Columbia near Mile 0 at Dawson Creek. Construction accelerated through the spring as the winter weather faded away and crews were able to work from both the northern and southern ends; they were spurred on after reports of the Japanese invasion of Kiska Island and Attu Island in the Aleutians. During construction the road was nicknamed the "oil can highway" by the work crews due to the large number of discarded oil cans and fuel drums that marked the road's progress. The construction crew had also passed through an Indigenous village known as Champagne (Shadhala-ra) which they used to set up camp. Unfortunately, disease spread and nearly wiped out the indigenous population of the village. After the war, the survivors left the village to find work, leaving the location a ghost town.

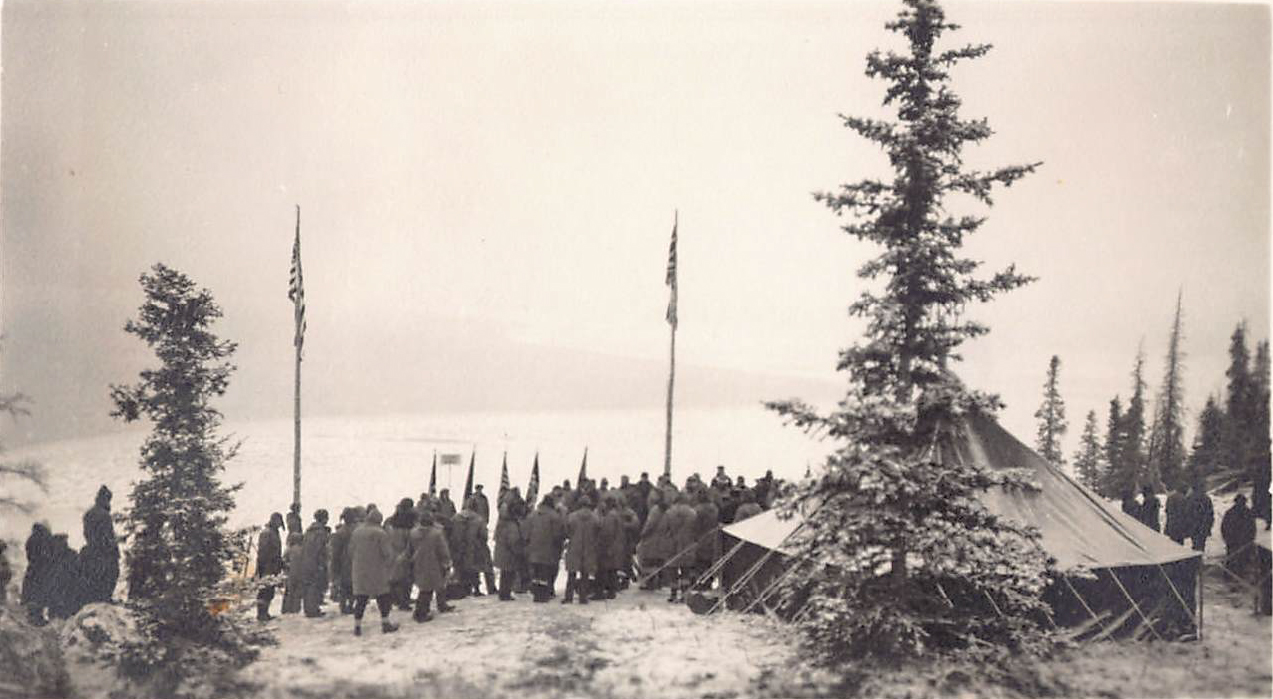
Group dedicating the Alaskan Highway (November 20, 1942)

On September 24, 1942, crews from both directions met at Mile 588 at what became named Contact Creek, at the British Columbia-Yukon border at the 60th parallel; the entire route was completed October 28, 1942, with the northern linkup at Mile 1202, Beaver Creek, and the highway was dedicated on November 20, 1942, at Soldier's Summit.

Although it was completed on October 28, 1942, and its completion was celebrated at Soldier's Summit on November 21 (and broadcast by radio, the exact outdoor temperature censored due to wartime concerns), the "highway" was not usable by general vehicles until 1943. Even then there were many steep grades, a poor surface, switchbacks to gain and descend hills, and few guardrails. Bridges, which progressed during 1942 from pontoon bridges to temporary log bridges, were replaced with steel bridges where necessary.

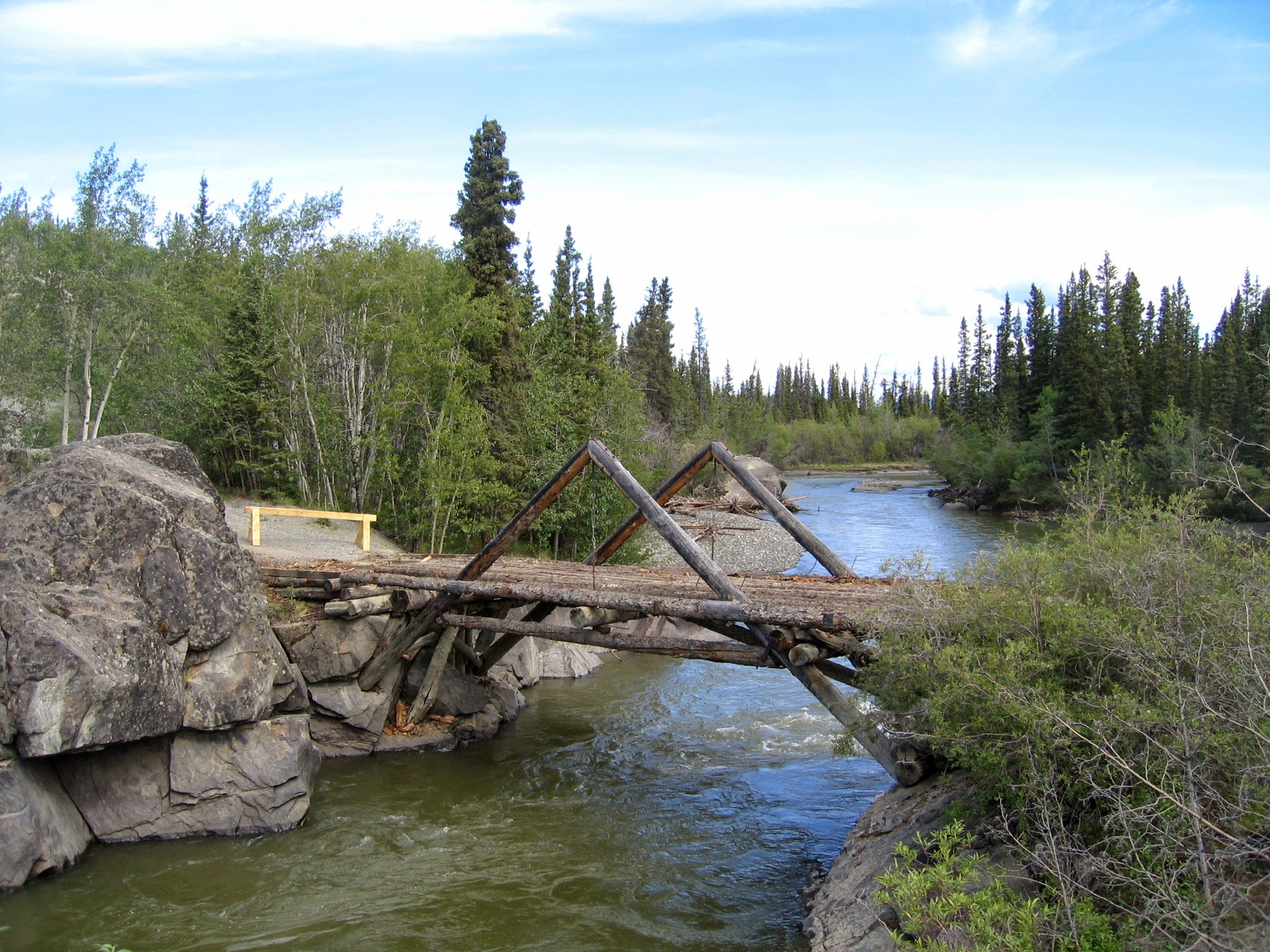
Replica log bridge at Aishihik River crossing

A replica log bridge, the Canyon Creek bridge, can be seen at the Aishihik River crossing; the bridge was rebuilt in 1987 and refurbished in 2005 by the Yukon government where it functions as a popular tourist attraction. The easing of the Japanese invasion threat resulted in no more contracts being given to private contractors for upgrading of specific sections.

Some 100 miles (160 km) of route between Burwash Landing and Koidern, Yukon, became nearly impassable in May and June 1943 due to permafrost thawing under the road and destroying the layer of delicate vegetation that held the road together. A corduroy road was built to restore the route, and corduroy still underlies old sections of highway in the area. Modern construction methods do not allow the permafrost to thaw, either by building a gravel berm on top or replacing the vegetation and soil immediately with gravel. The Burwash-Koidern section, however, is still a problem as the new highway built there in the late 1990s continues to experience frost heave.

Pincers on Japan and Look to the North, both 1944 productions, were National Film Board of Canada documentaries that depicted the construction of the Alaska Highway.

=== Post war ===
The original agreement between Canada and the United States regarding construction of the highway stipulated that its Canadian portion be turned over to Canada six months after the end of the war. In the postwar settlement, Canada did not pay for the highway itself, but assumed responsibility for its ongoing maintenance; furthermore, Canada compensated the United States for associated airfields, telephone lines, and other assets. The handover took place on April 1, 1946, when the U.S. Army transferred control of the road through Yukon and British Columbia to the Canadian Army, Northwest Highway System. The Alaskan section was completely paved during the 1960s. The lower 50 miles of the Canadian portion were paved in 1959, but the remainder was largely gravel. While the entire route is now completely paved (mostly with bituminous surface treatment), as late as the mid-1980s the highway still included sections of winding dusty road sandwiched between high quality reconstructed paved segments.

The Milepost, an extensive guide book to the Alaska Highway and other highways in Alaska and Northwest Canada, was first published in 1949 and continues to be published annually as the foremost guide to travelling the highway.

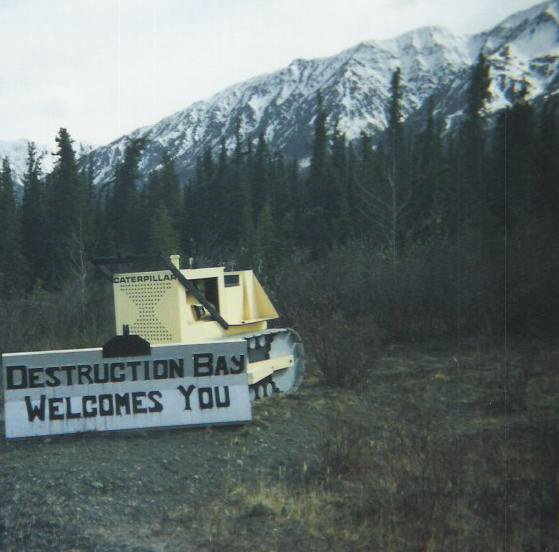
The settlement of Destruction Bay was originally a work camp for the highway.

The British Columbia government owns the first 82.6 miles (132.9 km) of the highway, the only portion paved during the late 1960s and 1970s. Public Works Canada manages the highway from Mile 82.6 (km 133) to Historic Mile 630. The Yukon government owns the highway from Historic Mile 630 to Historic Mile 1016 (from near Watson Lake to Haines Junction), and manages the remainder to the U.S. border at Historic Mile 1221. The State of Alaska owns the highway within that state (Mile 1221 to Mile 1422).

The Alaska Highway was built for military purposes and its route was not ideal for postwar development of northern Canada. Rerouting in Canada has shortened the highway by about 35 miles (56 km) since 1947, mostly by eliminating winding sections and sometimes by bypassing residential areas. The historic milepost markings are therefore no longer accurate but are still important as local location references. Some old sections of the highway are in use as local roads, while others are left to deteriorate and still others are plowed up. Four sections form local residential streets in Whitehorse and Fort Nelson, and others form country residential roadways outside of Whitehorse. Although Champagne, Yukon, was bypassed in 2002, the old highway is still completely in service for that community until a new direct access road is built.

Rerouting continues, expected to continue in the Yukon through 2009, with the Haines Junction-Beaver Creek section covered by the Canada-U.S. Shakwak Agreement. The new Donjek River bridge was opened September 26, 2007, replacing a 1952 bridge. Under Shakwak, U.S. federal highway money is spent for work done by Canadian contractors who win tenders issued by the Yukon government. The Shakwak Project completed the Haines Highway upgrades in the 1980s between Haines Junction and the Alaska Panhandle, then funding was stalled by Congress for several years.

The Milepost shows the Canadian section of the highway now to be about 1,187 miles (1,910 km), but the first milepost inside Alaska is 1222. The actual length of the highway inside Alaska is no longer clear because rerouting, as in Canada, has shortened the route, but unlike Canada, mileposts in Alaska are not recalibrated. The BC and Yukon governments and Public Works Canada have recalibrated kilometre posts. The latest BC recalibration was carried out in 1990; using its end-point at the border at Historic Mile 630, the Yukon government has recalibrated in three stages: in 2002, from Mile 630 to the west end of the Champagne revision; in fall 2005, to a point just at the southeast shore of Kluane Lake, and in fall 2008, to the border with Alaska.

There are historical mileposts along the B.C. and Yukon sections of the highway, installed in 1992, that note specific locations, although the posts no longer represent accurate driving distance. There are 80 mileposts in B.C., 70 in Yukon and 16 in Alaska with a simple number marker of the original mile distance. There are 31 "historic signs" in B.C., 22 in Yukon and 5 in Alaska, identifying the significance of the location. There are 18 interpretive panels in B.C., 14 in Yukon and 5 in Alaska which give detailed text information at a turn-off parking area.

The portion of the Alaska Highway in Alaska is designated Alaska Route 2. In Yukon, it is Highway 1 (designated in 1968) and in British Columbia, Highway 97. The portion of the Alaska Highway in Alaska is also unsigned Interstate A-1 and unsigned Interstate A-2.

=== Route markings ===
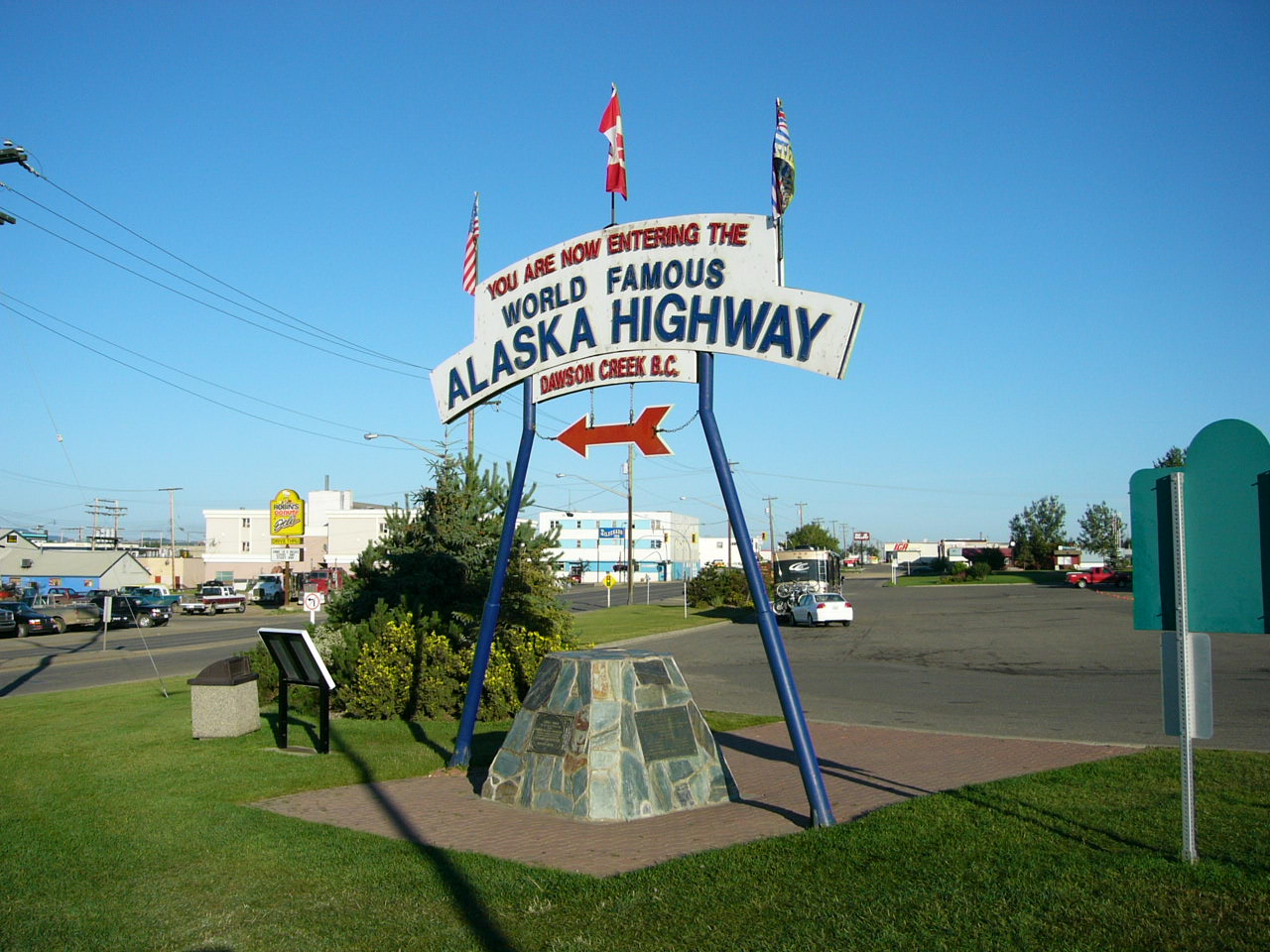
A monument at the southern terminus of the Alaska Highway (Dawson Creek)

The Canadian section of the road was delineated with mileposts, based on the road as it was in 1947, but over the years, reconstruction steadily shortened the distance between some of those mileposts. In 1978, metric signs were placed on the highway, and the mileposts were replaced with kilometre posts at the approximate locations of a historic mileage of equal value, e.g. km post 1000 was posted about where historical Mile 621 would have been posted.

As reconstruction continues to shorten the highway, the kilometre posts, at two-kilometre (1.2 mi) intervals, were recalibrated along the B.C. section of road to reflect the driving distances in 1990. The section of highway covered by the 1990 recalibration has since been rendered shorter by further realignments, such as near Summit Pass and between Muncho Lake and Iron Creek.

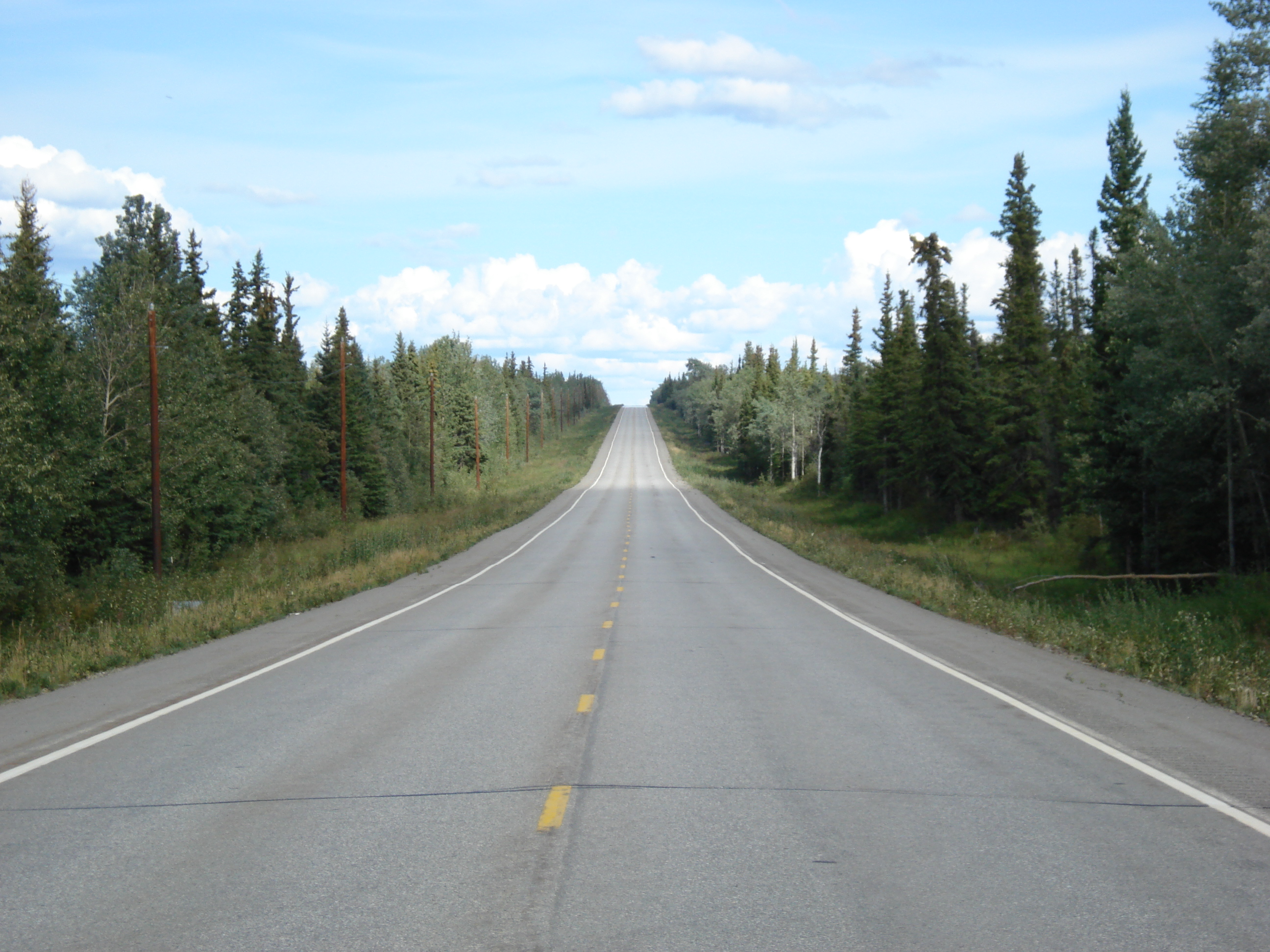
View of the highway at Mile 1,337, facing east

Based on where those values left off, new Yukon kilometre posts were erected in fall 2002 between the B.C. border and the west end of the new bypass around Champagne, Yukon; in 2005, additional recalibrated posts continued from there to the east shore of Kluane Lake near Silver City; and in fall 2008, from Silver City to the boundary with Alaska. Old kilometre posts, based on the historic miles, remained on the highway, after the first two recalibrations, from those points around Kluane Lake to the Alaska border. The B.C. and Yukon sections also have a small number of historic mileposts, printed on oval-shaped signs, at locations of historic significance; these special signs were erected in 1992 on the occasion of the highway's 50th anniversary.

The Alaska portion of the highway is still marked by mileposts at 1-mile (1.6 km) intervals, although they no longer represent accurate driving distance, due to reconstruction.

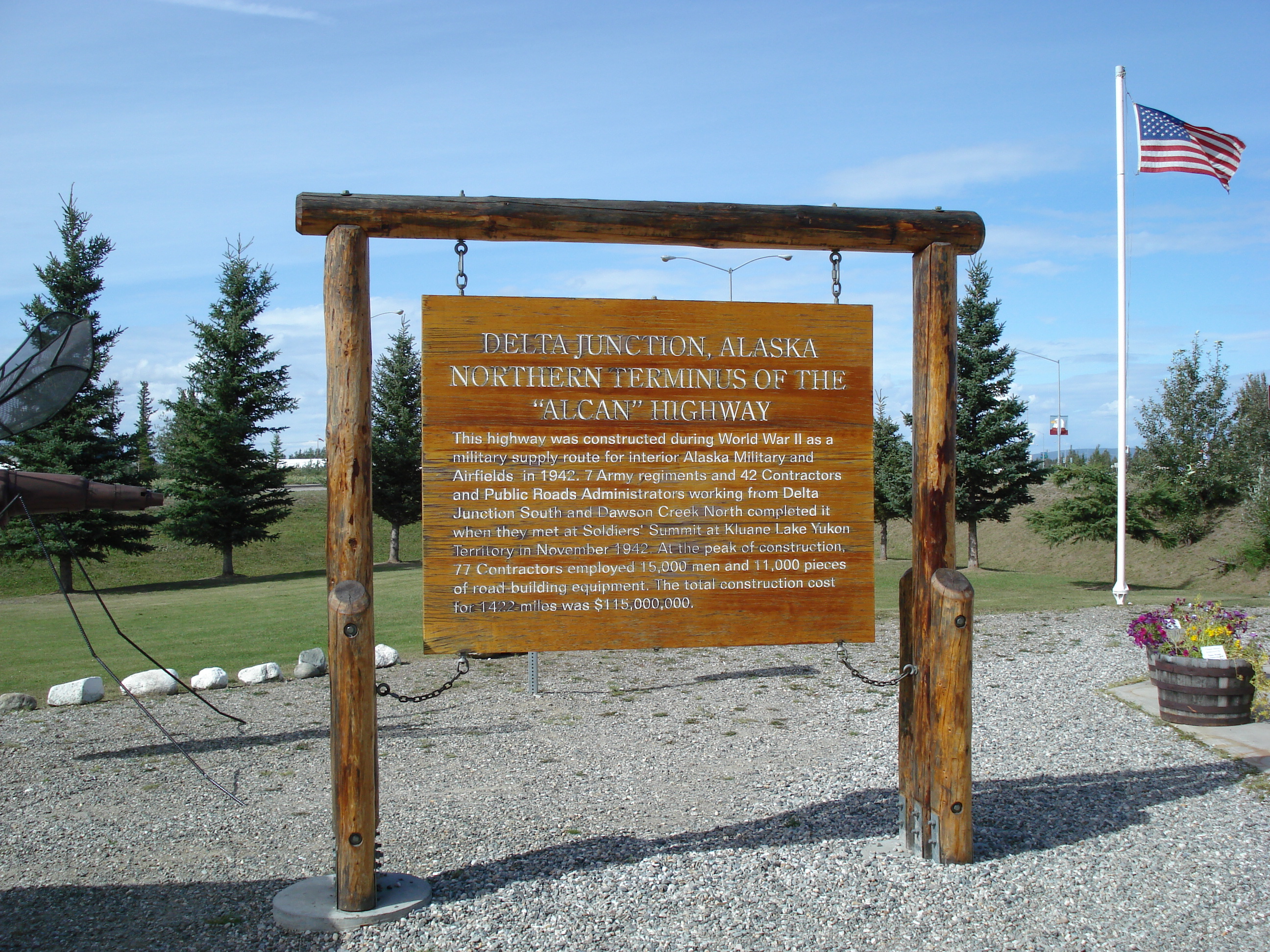
A monument at the northern terminus of the Alaska Highway (Delta Junction)

The historic mileposts are still used by residents and businesses along the highway to refer to their location, and in some cases are also used as postal addresses. The community Wonowon, British Columbia, is named by its location at mile 101, spoken "one-oh-one".

Residents and travelers, and the government of the Yukon, do not use "east" and "west" to refer to direction of travel on the Yukon section, even though this is the predominant bearing of the Yukon portion of the highway; "north" and "south" are used, referring to the south (Dawson Creek) and north (Delta Junction) termini of the highway. This is an important consideration for travelers who may otherwise be confused, particularly when a westbound travel routes southwestward or even due south to circumvent a natural obstacle such as Kluane Lake.

Some B.C. sections west of Fort Nelson also route more east-to-west, with southwest bearings in some section; again, "north" is used in preference to "west".

Since 1949, The Milepost, an exhaustive guide to the Alaska Highway and all other routes through the region, has been published each year.

=== Proposed U.S. Route 97 designation ===
U.S. Route 97
- Location: Canada–Fairbanks
- History: Proposed, but never designated

The portion of the Alaska Highway in Alaska was planned to become part of the United States Numbered Highway System and to be signed as part of U.S. Route 97 (US 97). In 1953, the British Columbia government renumbered a series of highways to Highway 97 between the U.S. border at Osoyoos, US 97's northern terminus, and Dawson Creek. The Alaska International Rail and Highway Commission lobbied for the designation of Highway 97 from Fairbanks to Mexico City in the late 1950s. Certain prior editions of United States Geological Survey topographic maps, mostly published during the 1950s, bore the US 97 highway shield along or near portions of the current AK-2. In 1964, the American Association of State Highway and Transportation Officials (AASHTO) approved an extension of US 97 from the Yukon border to Fairbanks along AK-2, conditional to Yukon renumbering its portion of the Alaska Highway; the Yukon government declined to renumber its portion of the highway and approval was withdrawn in 1968.

== Route description ==
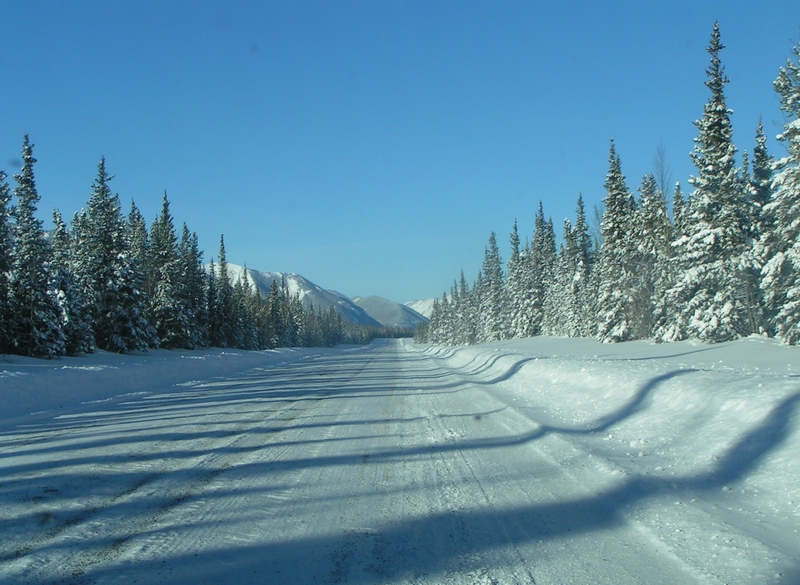
Alaska Highway between Fort Nelson and Watson Lake

The pioneer road completed in 1942 was about 1,680 miles (2,700 km) from Dawson Creek to Delta Junction. The Army then turned the road over to the Public Roads Administration (PRA), which then began putting out section contracts to private road contractors to upgrade selected sections of the road. These sections were upgraded, with removal of excess bends and steep grades; often, a traveler could identify upgraded sections by seeing the telephone line along the PRA-approved route alignment. When the Japanese invasion threat eased, the PRA stopped putting out new contracts. Upon hand-off to Canada in 1946, the route was 1,422 miles (2,288 km) from Dawson Creek to Delta Junction.

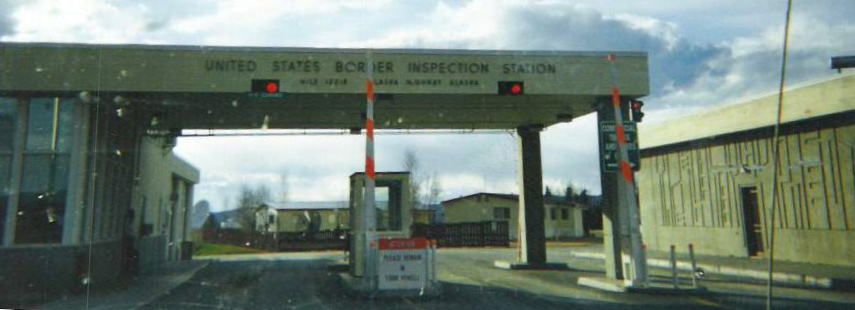
Border crossing at Port Alcan station

The route follows a northwest then northward course from Dawson Creek to Fort Nelson. On October 16, 1957, a suspension bridge crossing the Peace River just south of Fort St. John collapsed. A new bridge was built a few years later. At Fort Nelson, the road turns west and crosses the Rocky Mountains, before resuming a westward course at Coal River. The highway crossed the Yukon-BC border nine times from Mile 590 to Mile 773, six of those crossings were from Mile 590 to Mile 596. After passing the south end of Kluane Lake, the highway follows a north-northwest course to the Alaska border, then northwest to the terminus at Delta Junction.

Postwar rebuilding has not shifted the highway more than 10 miles (16 km) from the original alignment, and in most cases, by less than three miles (4.8 km). It is not clear if it still crosses the Yukon-BC border six times from Mile 590 to Mile 596.

=== Interstate Highway System ===
Interstate A1 and Interstate A2
- Location: Canada to Tok (A1); Tok to Delta Junction (A2)
- Length: 325.38 mi (523.65 km)
- Existed: 1976–present

The Alaska portion of the Alaska Highway is an unsigned part of the Interstate Highway System east of Fairbanks. The entire length of Interstate A-2 follows Route 2 from the George Parks Highway (Interstate A-4) junction in Fairbanks to Tok, east of which Route 2 carries Interstate A-1 off the Tok Cut-Off Highway to the international border. Only a short piece of the Richardson Highway in Fairbanks is built to freeway standards.

== Major intersections ==
Province / Territory / State	Regional District/Borough	Location	km	mi	Destinations	Notes
British Columbia	Peace River	Dawson Creek	0.0	0.0	Highway 2 east to Highway 49 – Spirit River, Grande Prairie, Edmonton; Highway 97 south (John Hart Highway) – Chetwynd, Tumbler Ridge, Prince George	Southern terminus of the Alaska Highway
British Columbia	Peace River	Taylor	53.5	33.2	Crossing over the Peace River	
British Columbia	Peace River	Fort St. John	71.7	44.6	100th Street – Cecil Lake, Fairview	
British Columbia	Peace River	Charlie Lake	84.2	52.3	Highway 29 south – Hudson's Hope, Chetwynd	
British Columbia	Northern Rockies	Fort Nelson	452.8	281.4	50 Street, Liard Street	
British Columbia	Northern Rockies		481.2	299.0	Highway 77 north (Liard Highway) – Fort Liard, Fort Simpson	
British Columbia	Northern Rockies		594.2	369.2	Summit Pass – 1,267 m (4,157 ft)	
British Columbia	Northern Rockies		760.1	472.3	Crossing over the Liard River	
			902.7	560.9	British Columbia–Yukon border	
			903.9	561.7	British Columbia–Yukon border	
			906.6	563.3	British Columbia–Yukon border	
			915.0	568.6	British Columbia–Yukon border	
			916.8	569.7	British Columbia–Yukon border	
			919.2	571.2	British Columbia–Yukon border	
			964.1	599.1	British Columbia–Yukon border Northern terminus of Highway 97; southern terminus of Hwy 1	
Yukon	Unorganized	Watson Lake	976.4	606.7	Hwy 4 north (Robert Campbell Highway) – Ross River, Faro	
Yukon	Unorganized		987.6	613.7	Crossing over the Liard River	
Yukon	Unorganized		997.6	619.9	Hwy 37 south (Stewart–Cassiar Highway) – Dease Lake, BC, Stewart, BC	
					British Columbia–Yukon border	
			1,161.9	722.0	British Columbia–Yukon border	
Yukon	Unorganized	Teslin	1,201.9	746.8	Crossing over Teslin Lake	
Yukon	Unorganized	Johnsons Crossing	1,253.2	778.7	Hwy 6 north (Canol Road) – Ross River	
Yukon	Unorganized	Jake's Corner	1,253.2	778.7	Hwy 8 west (Tagish Road) – Tagish, Carcross, Atlin, BC	
Yukon	Unorganized		1,350.2	839.0	Crossing over the Yukon River	
Yukon	Unorganized	Carcross Cutoff	1,361.4	845.9	Hwy 2 south (Klondike Highway) – Carcross, Tagish, Skagway, AK	South end of Hwy 2 concurrency
Yukon	Unorganized	Whitehorse	1,376.2	855.1	South Access Road	
Yukon	Unorganized	Whitehorse	1,382.0	858.7	Hamilton Boulevard, Two Mile Hill Road	
Yukon	Unorganized	Whitehorse	1,393.7	866.0	Hwy 2 north (Klondike Highway) – Carmacks, Dawson City	North end of Hwy 2 concurrency
Yukon	Unorganized	Haines Junction	1,533.9	953.1	Hwy 3 south (Haines Highway) – Haines, AK	
Yukon	Unorganized	Beaver Creek	1,849.9	1,149.5		
Alcan–Beaver Creek Border Crossing			1,856.6	1,153.6	Canada–United States border Northern terminus of Hwy 1; southern terminus of AK-2	
Alaska	Unorganized	Tetlin Junction			AK-5 north (Taylor Highway) – Eagle, Dawson City, YK	
Alaska	Unorganized	Tok			AK-1 west (Tok Cut-Off Highway) – Valdez, Anchorage	
Alaska	Unorganized	Delta Junction			AK-4 south (Richardson Highway) – Glennallen AK-2 north (Richardson Highway) – Fairbanks	Northern terminus of Alaska Highway
1.000 mi = 1.609 km; 1.000 km = 0.621 mi: Concurrency terminus; Route transition

== Bypassed road segments still in use ==
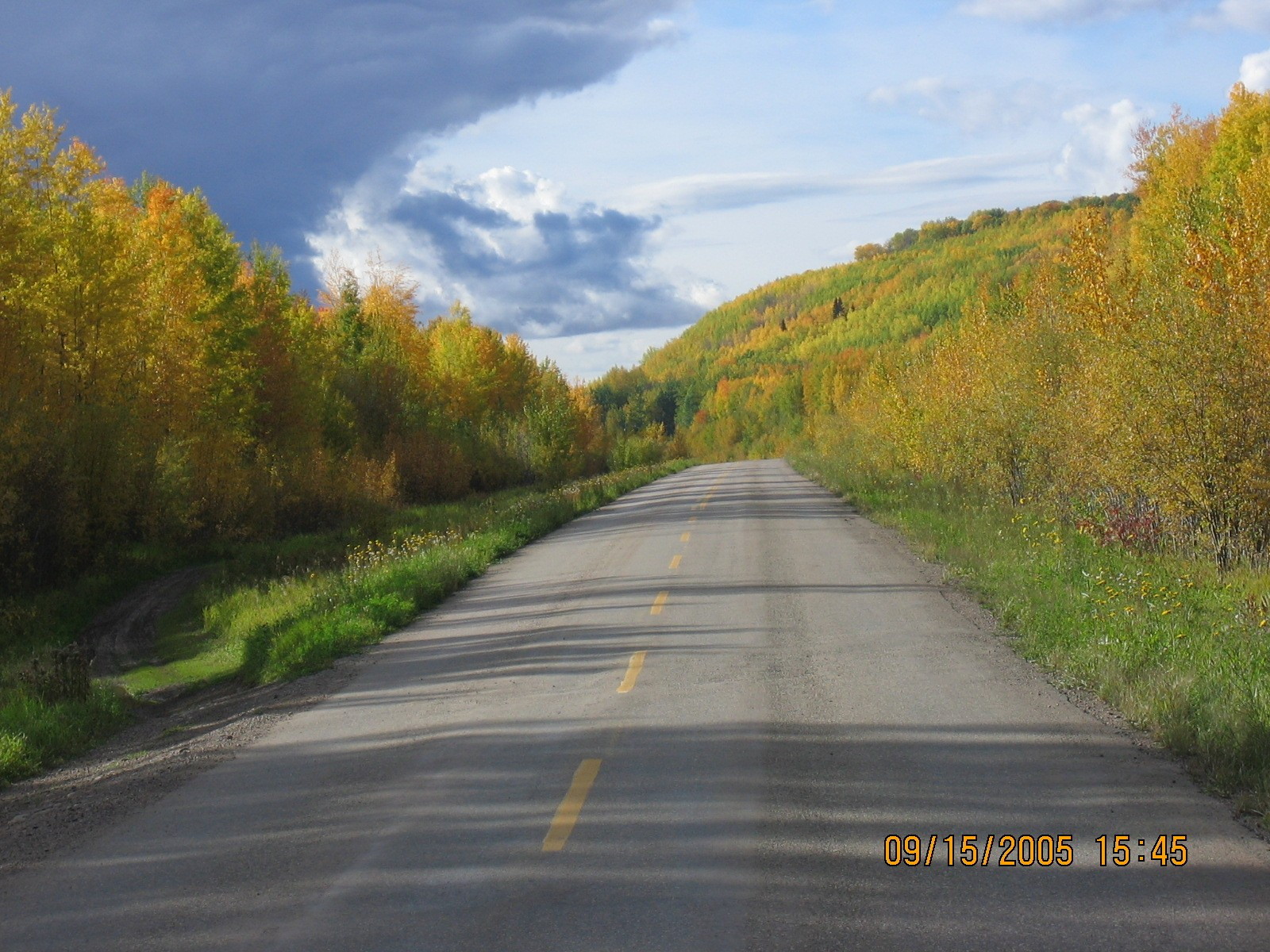
Bypassed segment still in use, west of Fort Nelson, 2005

=== Fort Nelson ===
- Mile 301 to 308, now local residential feeder roads Wildflower Drive, Highland Road, Valleyview Drive

=== Whitehorse ===
- Mile 898, now local residential road just west of Yukon River Bridge
- Mile 920.3 to 922.5, now the southern and northern portions of Centennial Street; middle portion is Birch Street
- Mile 922.5 to 922.7, now a portion of Azure Road
- Mile 924, now a portion of Cousins Airfield Road
- Mile 925.5 to 926.9, now Parent Road (east end overlooks Alaska Highway/Klondike Highway junction)
- Mile 927.2 to 927.7, now Echo Valley Road
- Mile 928 to 928.3, now Jackson Road
- Mile 929 to 934, now Old Alaska Highway
- Mile 968, now entrance road to Mendenhall River Subdivision

=== Champagne-Aishihik traditional territory ===
- Mile 969 to 981, Champagne loop (bypassed in fall 2002 by 8.6-mile (13.8 km) revision)
- Mile 1016, Hume Street in Haines Junction including access to First Nation subdivision

== Alaska-Canada Military Highway (Segment) ==
- Alaska-Canada Military Highway (Segment)
- U.S. National Register of Historic Places
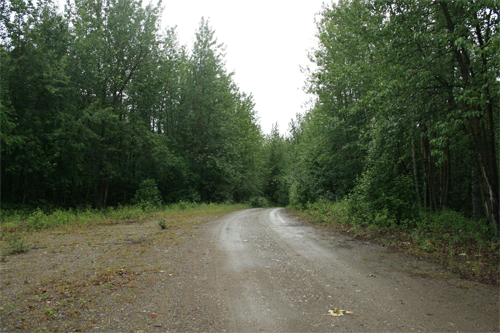
- Bypassed segment still in use, southeast of Delta Junction
- Location: About 37 miles (60 km) southeast of Delta Junction
- Nearest city: Delta Junction
- Coordinates: 63.731465°N 144.700526°W
- Built: 1904
- NRHP reference No.: 13000543
- Added to NRHP: July 31, 2013

- Mile 1348, one 2.5-mile (4.0 km) bypassed section of the original route, about 37 miles (60 km) southeast of Delta Junction, is listed on the National Register of Historic Places as "one of the few sections of the road in Alaska virtually unchanged". The unpaved road is used by local residents to access Craig Lake, and is signed as Craig Lake Trail.

Other former segments have deteriorated and are no longer usable. More recent construction projects have deliberately plowed up roadway to close it.

== See also ==
- Inter-American Highway
- R504 Kolyma Highway
- Pan-American Highway
- Sign Post Forest
- Alcan–Beaver Creek Border Crossing
