= Shakwak Agreement =

Canada-USA bilateral treaty

- Type: Highway construction
- Signed: 1976
- Signatories: Canada; United States

The Shakwak Agreement, also known as the Shakwak Project, is a highway construction funding accord between the United States and Canada, reached in 1976. The agreement, covering Canadian portions of the Haines Highway and Alaska Highway, deals with long-standing requests from Alaskans for improvement of the roads connecting the panhandle with the rest of the state of Alaska.

Under the agreement, the United States approves funds that are used by Canadian contractors to rebuild the highway. For most of the last 20 years, the funding was handled by the Yukon government, as it tendered sections of the highways for work. The Haines Highway rebuild was actually completed during the early 1980s, then funding dried up for several years. Work since the early 1990s has been carried out on the Alaska Highway, and is expected to be completed before 2010, with two major bridge replacements yet to be completed; the Donjek River bridge was completed and opened to traffic in late September 2007; the White River bridge was completed several years ago, leaving the Duke and Slims river bridges yet to be built.
